= Hemispheres Tour =

1978–1979 concert tour by Rush

- Tour by Rush
- Poster with the dates of the Canadian concerts
- Location: Europe; North America
- Associated album: Hemispheres
- Start date: October 14, 1978
- End date: June 4, 1979
- Legs: 2
- No. of shows: 137

Rush concert chronology
- A Farewell to Kings Tour (1977–1978); Hemispheres Tour (1978–1979); Permanent Waves Tour (1979–1980)

The Hemispheres Tour (also referred to as The Tour of the Hemispheres) was a concert tour by Canadian rock band Rush in support of their sixth studio album, Hemispheres.

== Background ==
The tour began on October 14, 1978 which began with arenas in Canada, extending out into the United States. It was the first tour where the band was noted as a major headlining act, playing an hour and a half instead of a forty-five minute set, with hopes that the audience would appreciate the length of the set. While keeping a good lighting system, the band began extending their PA system, as well as becoming more active on stage with the usage of backdrops, giving the audience something to look at - something that became a major part of their performances. Rush toured Europe in April to May 1979, concluding their tour with a performance at the Pinkpop Festival in Holland, which had followed after Lifeson broke his finger, resulting in three shows being canceled, but however he had performed at the festival with no problems. The tour was accompanied by the release of the European compilation album, Rush Through Time, which was unauthorized by the band at the time but was officially released through Mercury Records.

== Reception ==
Reviewing the October 25, 1978 performance in Saskatoon, Star-Phoenix's Joe Rubin noted on the band's usage of special effects which he had stated held the audience 'spellbound' with balls of light, swirling spirals and spaceships depicted on the screen suspended behind the band as they performed. Regarding the audience, Rubin stated it was understandable as they were grogged on sound, later benumbed and ecstatic at the conclusion of the performance.

The Spokesman-Review's Dave Reagan, reviewing the November 8, 1978 performance in Spokane, wrote that the band had proved its reputation to be loud but talented. He observed that the music was relatively clean and low enough to not compound the echoing effects of the coliseum where the show took place. Also noting on the special effects and the lighting accompanied by the use of the synthesizer, Reagan stated that it had brought the audience to both its feet and knees, with the visuals keeping the longer songs exciting and alive, with no interest lost from the audience.

== Set list ==
This is an example set list adapted from Rush: Wandering the Face of the Earth – The Official Touring History of what were performed during the tour, but may not represent the majority of the shows. "Circumstances" was removed from the set during the band's shows in the United Kingdom, with "Something for Nothing" and "Cygnus X-1" being removed from the set during the rest of the shows in Europe.

Main Setlist

1. "Anthem"
2. "A Passage to Bangkok"
3. "By-Tor and the Snow Dog"
4. "Xanadu"
5. "Something for Nothing"
6. "The Trees"
7. "Cygnus X-1"
8. "Hemispheres"
9. "Closer to the Heart"
10. "Circumstances"
11. "A Farewell to Kings"
12. "La Villa Strangiato"
13. "2112" (Chapters I–IV, VI–VII)
  Encore
14. "Working Man" / "Bastille Day" / "In the Mood" (medley, with drum solo)

== Tour dates ==
List of 1978 concerts
Date	City	Country	Venue
October 14, 1978	Kingston	Canada	Kingston Memorial Center
October 15, 1978	Guelph	Canada	Guelph Memorial Gardens
October 17, 1978	North Bay	Canada	North Bay Memorial Gardens
October 18, 1978	Sudbury	Canada	Sudbury Community Arena
October 20, 1978	Thunder Bay	Canada	Fort William Gardens
October 21, 1978	Winnipeg	Canada	Winnipeg Arena
October 22, 1978	Brandon	Canada	Keystone Center
October 24, 1978	Regina	Canada	Regina Agridome
October 25, 1978	Saskatoon	Canada	Saskatoon Arena
October 27, 1978	Edmonton	Canada	Northlands Coliseum
October 28, 1978	Calgary	Canada	Stampede Corral
October 29, 1978	Lethbridge	Canada	Lethbridge Sportsplex
October 31, 1978	Kamloops	Canada	KXA Auditorium
November 2, 1978	Victoria	Canada	Victoria Memorial Arena
November 3, 1978	Nanaimo	Canada	Frank Crane Arena
November 4, 1978	Vancouver	Canada	Pacific Coliseum
November 6, 1978	Portland	United States	Portland Memorial Coliseum
November 7, 1978	Seattle	United States	Seattle Center Coliseum
November 8, 1978	Spokane	United States	Spokane Coliseum
November 10, 1978	Sacramento	United States	Sacramento Memorial Auditorium
November 11, 1978	Reno	United States	Centennial Coliseum
November 13, 1978	San Diego	United States	San Diego Sports Arena
November 14, 1978	Long Beach	United States	Long Beach Arena
November 15, 1978	Fresno	United States	Warnors Theater
November 16, 1978	Daly City	United States	Cow Palace
November 18, 1978	San Bernardino	United States	Swing Auditorium
November 19, 1978	Phoenix	United States	Arizona Veterans Memorial Coliseum
November 20, 1978	Tucson	United States	Tucson Community Center
November 21, 1978	Albuquerque	United States	Albuquerque Civic Auditorium
November 30, 1978	Indianapolis	United States	Market Square Arena
December 1, 1978	Dayton	United States	Hara Arena
December 2, 1978	Detroit	United States	Cobo Arena
December 3, 1978	Toledo	United States	Toledo Sports Arena
December 5, 1978	Davenport	United States	Palmer Auditorium
December 7, 1978	Milwaukee	United States	MECCA Arena
December 8, 1978	Green Bay	United States	Brown County Arena
December 9, 1978	Saint Paul	United States	St. Paul Civic Center
December 10, 1978	Des Moines	United States	Veterans Memorial Auditorium
December 11, 1978	Kansas City	United States	Kansas City Municipal Auditorium
December 13, 1978	St. Louis	United States	The Checkerdome
December 14, 1978	Chicago	United States	International Amphitheater
December 15, 1978	Chicago	United States	International Amphitheater
December 16, 1978	Chicago	United States	International Amphitheater
December 17, 1978	Madison	United States	Dane County Coliseum
December 19, 1978	London	Canada	London Gardens
December 20, 1978	Kitchener	Canada	Kitchener Memorial Auditorium
December 21, 1978	Ottawa	Canada	Ottawa Civic Center
December 26, 1978	Montreal	Canada	Montreal Forum
December 27, 1978	Montreal	Canada	Montreal Forum
December 28, 1978	Toronto	Canada	Maple Leaf Gardens
December 29, 1978	Toronto	Canada	Maple Leaf Gardens
December 31, 1978	Toronto	Canada	Maple Leaf Gardens

List of 1979 concerts
Date	City	Country	Venue
January 11, 1979	Boston	United States	Boston Music Hall
January 12, 1979	Springfield	United States	Springfield Civic Center
January 13, 1979	New York City	United States	The Palladium
January 14, 1979	New York City	United States	The Palladium
January 16, 1979	Albany	United States	Palace Theater
January 17, 1979	Passaic	United States	Capitol Theater
January 19, 1979	Pittsburgh	United States	Pittsburgh Civic Arena
January 20, 1979	Baltimore	United States	Baltimore Civic Center
January 21, 1979	Philadelphia	United States	The Spectrum
January 23, 1979	Syracuse	United States	Onondaga War Memorial Auditorium
January 24, 1979	Buffalo	United States	Buffalo Memorial Auditorium
January 26, 1979	Cincinnati	United States	Riverfront Coliseum
January 27, 1979	Huntsville	United States	Von Braun Civic Center
January 28, 1979	Memphis	United States	Mid-South Coliseum
January 30, 1979	Louisville	United States	Louisville Gardens
January 31, 1979	Bloomington	United States	IU Auditorium
February 1, 1979	Columbus	United States	St. John Arena
February 2, 1979	Saginaw	United States	Saginaw Civic Center
February 3, 1979	Richfield	United States	Richfield Coliseum
February 10, 1979	Oklahoma City	United States	Oklahoma State Fairgrounds
February 15, 1979	Columbia	United States	Township Auditorium
February 17, 1979	Fayetteville	United States	Cumberland County Memorial Arena
February 19, 1979	Asheville	United States	Asheville Civic Center
February 20, 1979	Knoxville	United States	Knoxville Civic Coliseum
February 22, 1979	Little Rock	United States	Barton Coliseum
February 23, 1979	Shreveport	United States	Hirsch Memorial Coliseum
February 24, 1979	Tulsa	United States	Tulsa Fairgrounds Pavilion
February 25, 1979	Austin	United States	Austin Municipal Auditorium
February 27, 1979	Corpus Christi	United States	Corpus Christi Memorial Coliseum
March 1, 1979	Houston	United States	Sam Houston Coliseum
March 2, 1979	Dallas	United States	Dallas Convention Center
March 3, 1979	San Antonio	United States	HemisFair Arena
March 4, 1979	Beaumont	United States	Beaumont Civic Center
March 6, 1979	New Orleans	United States	New Orleans Municipal Auditorium
March 8, 1979	Mobile	United States	Mobile Expo Hall
March 9, 1979	Jacksonville	United States	Jacksonville Civic Auditorium
March 10, 1979	Hollywood	United States	Hollywood Sportatorium
March 11, 1979	Tampa	United States	Curtis Hixon Convention Hall
March 13, 1979	Birmingham	United States	Boutwell Auditorium
March 15, 1979	Chattanooga	United States	Soldiers & Sailors Memorial Auditorium
March 16, 1979	Nashville	United States	Nashville Municipal Auditorium
March 17, 1979	Johnson City	United States	Freedom Hall
March 18, 1979	Wheeling	United States	Wheeling Civic Center
March 27, 1979	Salt Lake City	United States	Salt Palace
March 28, 1979	Denver	United States	Denver Auditorium
March 29, 1979	Lincoln	United States	Pershing Center
March 30, 1979	Topeka	United States	Topeka Municipal Auditorium
April 2, 1979	Syracuse	United States	Onondaga War Memorial Auditorium
April 3, 1979	Poughkeepsie	United States	Mid-Hudson Civic Center
April 4, 1979	Rochester	United States	War Memorial Auditorium
April 6, 1979	Hempstead	United States	Nassau Coliseum
April 7, 1979	New Haven	United States	New Haven Coliseum
April 10, 1979	Salem	United States	Roanoke Valley Civic Center
April 11, 1979	Hampton	United States	Hampton Coliseum
April 13, 1979	Atlanta	United States	Fox Theater
April 14, 1979	Greensboro	United States	Greensboro Coliseum
April 15, 1979	Providence	United States	Providence Civic Center
April 23, 1979	Newcastle	England	Newcastle City Hall
April 24, 1979	Newcastle	England	Newcastle City Hall
April 25, 1979	Glasgow	Scotland	Glasgow Apollo
April 26, 1979	Glasgow	Scotland	Glasgow Apollo
April 27, 1979	Glasgow	Scotland	Glasgow Apollo
April 28, 1979	Edinburgh	Scotland	Edinburgh Odeon
April 29, 1979	Manchester	England	Manchester Apollo
April 30, 1979	Manchester	England	Manchester Apollo
May 1, 1979	Liverpool	England	Empire Theater
May 2, 1979	Liverpool	England	Empire Theater
May 4, 1979	London	England	Hammersmith Odeon
May 5, 1979	London	England	Hammersmith Odeon
May 6, 1979	London	England	Hammersmith Odeon
May 7, 1979	London	England	Hammersmith Odeon
May 9, 1979	Coventry	England	Coventry Theater
May 10, 1979	Birmingham	England	Birmingham Odeon
May 11, 1979	Birmingham	England	Birmingham Odeon
May 13, 1979	Southampton	England	Gaumont Theater
May 14, 1979	Bristol	England	Colston Hall
May 15, 1979	Bristol	England	Colston Hall
~~May 17, 1979~~ (Note: The performance on May 17, 1979 was canceled due to a fire burning down the venue.)	Paris	France	Le Stadium
May 18, 1979	Poperinge	Belgium	Maeke Blyde Hall
May 22, 1979	Oslo	Norway	Chateau Neuf
May 23, 1979	Gothenburg	Sweden	Gothenburg Concert House
May 25, 1979	Stockholm	Sweden	Grona Lund
May 27, 1979	Erlangen	West Germany	Stadthalle
May 28, 1979	Offenbach	West Germany	Stadthalle
May 29, 1979	Hamburg	West Germany	Hamburg Music Hall
~~May 31, 1979~~ (Note: The performances on May 31, June 1 and 2, 1979 were canceled due to Lifeson breaking a finger.)	Mannheim	West Germany	Rose Garden
~~June 1, 1979~~	Zurich	Switzerland	Volkshaus
~~June 2, 1979~~	Munich	West Germany	Circus Krone
June 4, 1979	Geleen	Netherlands	Damen Sports Park

=== Box office score data ===
List of box office score data with date, city, venue, attendance, gross, references
Date	City	Venue	Attendance	Gross	Ref(s)
December 11, 1978	Kansas City, United States	Municipal Auditorium	9,250	$72,029	
January 11, 1979	Boston, United States	Music Hall	3,800	$31,750	
January 13–14, 1979	New York City, United States	Palladium	6,300 / 6,300	$52,000	
January 17, 1979	Passaic, United States	Capitol Theatre	3,456 / 3,456	$28,172	
January 19, 1979	Pittsburgh, United States	Civic Arena	14,032 / 14,032	$110,421	
January 20, 1979	Baltimore, United States	Civic Center	8,676	$60,578	
January 21, 1979	Philadelphia, United States	Spectrum	13,064	$94,467	
January 27, 1979	Huntsville, United States	Civic Center	6,850	$46,891	
January 28, 1979	Memphis, United States	Coliseum	7,263	$50,833	
January 30, 1979	Louisville, United States	Gardens	7,201 / 7,201	$48,612	
January 31, 1979	Bloomington, United States	IU Auditorium	1,968	$14,498	
February 1, 1979	Columbus, United States	St. John's Arena	7,355	$57,950	
February 2, 1979	Saginaw, United States	Civic Center	7,104 / 7,104	$60,384	
February 20, 1979	Knoxville, United States	Coliseum	3,901	$28,265	
March 9, 1979	Jacksonville, United States	Civic Auditorium	3,125	$20,875	
March 10, 1979	Hollywood, United States	Sportatorium	9,937	$60,757	
March 11, 1979	Tampa, United States	Hixon Hall	7,600 / 7,600	$45,077	
March 15, 1979	Chattanooga, United States	Soldiers & Sailors Memorial Auditorium	3,130	$21,868	
March 16, 1979	Nashville, United States	Municipal Auditorium	8,468	$43,844	
March 18, 1979	Wheeling, United States	Civic Center	6,233	$46,812	
March 29, 1979	Lincoln, United States	Pershing Auditorium	4,275	$30,800	
March 30, 1979	Topeka, United States	Municipal Auditorium	4,200 / 4,200	$29,400	
April 3, 1979	Poughkeepsie, United States	Civic Center	3,372 / 3,372	$28,263	
April 4, 1979	Rochester, United States	War Memorial Auditorium	10,500 / 10,500	$89,253	
April 6, 1979	Uniondale, United States	Nassau Coliseum	10,400	$85,160	
April 7, 1979	New Haven, United States	Coliseum	5,800	$47,597	
April 11, 1979	Hampton, United States	Coliseum	6,165	$45,029	
April 15, 1979	Providence, United States	Civic Center	6,684	$48,370	

== Personnel ==
- Geddy Lee – vocals, bass, keyboards
- Alex Lifeson – guitar, backing vocals
- Neil Peart – drums
