= II. "Apollo Bringer of Wisdom" and III. "Dionysus Bringer of Love" =

Movements II and III of "Cygnus X-1 Book II: Hemispheres" by Rush

"Apollo Bringer of Wisdom" / "Dionysus Bringer of Love"
- Neil Peart's handwritten lyrics sheet

Composition by Rush

from the album Hemispheres
- Released: October 24, 1978
- Recorded: June and July 1978
- Studio: Rockfield (Rockfield, Monmouthshire); Advision (London)
- Genre: Progressive rock
- Length: 4:36: 2:30 ("Apollo"); 2:06 ("Dionysus")
- Label: Anthem
- Composers: Geddy Lee; Alex Lifeson
- Lyricist: Neil Peart
- Producers: Rush; Terry Brown

"Cygnus X-1 Book II: Hemispheres" chronology
I. "Prelude" (1978)	II. "Apollo Bringer of Wisdom" / III. "Dionysus Bringer of Love" (1978)	IV. "Armageddon The Battle of Heart and Mind" (1978)

"Apollo Bringer of Wisdom" and "Dionysus Bringer of Love" (Note: Formatted in the vinyl tracklist with italic type) are, respectively, the second and third movements of the suite "Cygnus X-1 Book II: Hemispheres". The 18-minute progressive rock epic is the opening side-long track of Canadian band Rush's sixth studio album Hemispheres (1978). The lyrics were written by drummer Neil Peart and the music composed by bassist and lead vocalist Geddy Lee and guitarist Alex Lifeson. It was arranged and produced by the band and Terry Brown. The album was recorded between June to July 1978 Rockfield and Advision studios and released on October 28.

Each movement provides an explanation for the extreme philosophies of their respective gods and the results of their implementation onto the people. Apollo represented logic and reason, and provided the tools of civilization and intellectual discussion. The people soon followed the god of feelings and spontaneity, Dionysus, out of disaffection with it. However, that made them unprepared for the cold winters and caused starvation. With minor exceptions, the same musical theme is shared between movements, a focal point of discussion about the "Hemispheres" suite in reviews. It consists of measures in 7/8 and 4/4. Several of Rush's live performances of "Hemispheres" excluded "Apollo", and all removed "Dionysus".

== Background ==
Rush's sixth studio album Hemispheres (1978) was recorded in June and July 1978. The music was tracked at Rockfield Studios and the vocals London's Advision Studios, all before mixing took place at Trident Studios in Soho in August. Rush and Terry Brown are credited as arrangers and producers.

Hemispheres has a side-long epic as its title track, "Cygnus X-1 Book II: Hemispheres". The six-movement suite as composed by bassist and lead vocalist Geddy Lee and guitarist Alex Lifeson and arranged and produced by Rush and Terry Brown. Drummer Neil Peart penned the lyrics. "Hemispheres" continues "Cygnus X-1 Book I: The Voyage" from previous album A Farewell to Kings (1977), depicting an unnamed astronaut getting sucked into the black hole of Cygnus X-1. In "Hemispheres", the character, now named Cygnus, is revealed to be alive but without a physical presence. The world they are sucked into is divided by the two titular "hemispheres" in conflict with each other, each supporting a different god. "Apollo Bringer of Wisdom" and "Dionysus Bringer of Love" are the second and third movements about life under the philosophies of these gods preceding "Armageddon The Battle of Heart and Mind".

Hemispheres was released on October 28, 1978, by Anthem Records, with the epic as its opener.

== Composition ==
"Apollo Bringer of Wisdom" (2:30) and "Dionysus Bringer of Love" (2:06) have the same musical theme, played in E major at a medium tempo with a strong beat. Minor differences are that "Apollo" starts with a measure in 3/4 and concludes with a heavy metal pitch-bent guitar solo. The lyrical formula is also the same. A movement's titular god is quoted explaining their personality and promises, followed by a narration of the consequences of their rule.

The composition underscoring the god's dialogue starts with four instrumental 7/8 bars. This is followed by a pattern of six in 7/8 and eight in 4/4 followed twice in a row. The first instance of the pattern follows the chord progression of Gmaj_{7}–F♯_{7}sus_{4}, the second B♭maj_{7}–A_{7}sus_{4}. A ten-measure instrumental interlude follows, which consists of the F♯_{7}(add B) chords that opened the suite's "Prelude". This section shifts to playing A(add B) for the fifth and sixth measures. The time signature also changes. The second, fourth and sixth measures play in 4/4, the final tenth (which is a segue into the narration section) in 3/4, and the rest in 7/8. The R&B-influenced, 24-measure narration section is entirely in 4/4 and follows the chord progression E–D–Dsus_{4}–D–A–B–A.

== Lyrics ==
"Apollo Bringer of Wisdom" covers life under the god that represented order, reason and logic. "Truth and understanding", "Wit and wisdom fair" and "Precious gifts beyond compare" is brought into the world. With the shelter, fire and food Apollo provides, the people "build their cities and converse among the wise", creating the "grace and comfort" of civilization. However, the population begins to question their own motives and lose their desires, creating dissatisfaction with their current lifestyle. Following another discussion with the wise men, they cross the Bridge of Death to seek an alternative. The cities fall silent.

"Dionysus Bringer of Love" depicts them following the commands of the god of feeling, specifically the uninhibited and sensual. Reasoning that each person's "prison disappears", Dionysus frees the inhabitants from the "chains of reason". The god provides "love to give [them] solace in the darkness of the night" and "the heart’s eternal light". Laughter, music, tears, joy and the soothing of fears are also given. The people move to a forest filled with stars during the night with food and wine "aplenty", celebrating until "cold starvation", wolves and despair enter the picture as winter begins.

== Reception ==
Martin Popoff, who has written multiple Rush books, described the "Apollo" and "Dionysus" sections as "dark and dreamy but still full volume". Richard James called them "impressive music played with intensity and sung into passion". He gave additional praise to the segue into "Armageddon The Battle of Heard and Mind". Musicologist Durrell Bowman summarized each movement as "warring and aimless people", as well as "Rush, presumably", pondering on the benefits of the other side they abandoned.

A variety of explanations have been given towards the similar musical theme. However, all of them were how it symbolized the viewpoints of Apollo and Dionysus. Bowman inductively reasoned it was an attempt to not have one side "privilege" another. Conversely, James wrote it represented both competing for domination. Langdon Hickman explained it trivialized the already "silly" and "meaningless" arguments, and that they were "broken halves of a single complete whole". Alex Body suggested it was to present them as equally extreme despite being fulls contrasts. During the gods' dialogue, Bowman also perceived "constant motion among adjacent extended chords" signaling a lack of stability of their rule.

The artistic choice was not well received by writers of Rush's discography. Hickman argued it did not ruin the whole suite, but slightly tanked it below the first "Cygnus X-1" entry. He cited it as a negative example of the "overblown" aspect of progressive rock, describing its reason a "level of abstraction and book-chewing to justify a musical choice that ultimately sounds bad". In Richard James' opinion, it was "wearing" on a four-and-a-half-minute portion of the 18-minute track. This caued Peart's balanced approach of showing two perspectives to become "unstuck". He felt the differences in ideologies would have been shown much better had "Apollo" been in a more sophisticated arrangement, and "Dionysus" a more free-form jazz style. This would have created a "musical personality" contrast.

Tristanne Connolly wrote and edited a book on Canadian popular music's connection with the nation's culture, Canadian Music and American Culture: Get Away From Me (2017). In it, she wrote that the epic's presentation of two differing perspectives supported a theory by Canadian academic Linda Hutcheon: "Canada's voice is often a doubled one". Winter was also noted as a frequent factor in the events of both sections. Apollo teaches the men fire to "keep you warm through the endless winter storm", and Dionysus' philosophy makes them unprepared for it. Connolly explained this may have been influenced by the Toronto area Rush originated from. Its weather is of the extreme ends of "hot, humid summers and cold, windy, snowy winters".

== Personnel ==
Rush

- Geddy Lee – bass guitar, Minimoog synthesizer, Oberheim Polyphonic Synthesizer, Moog Taurus bass pedals, vocals
- Alex Lifeson – 6-and 12-string electric guitars
- Neil Peart – drums

Production

- Rush – production, arrangement
- Terry Brown – production, arrangement, mixing at Trident Studios
- Pat Moran – engineering at Rockfield Studios
- Declan O'Doherty – engineering at Advision Studios
- John Brand – mixing assistance at Trident Studios
- Ray Staff – mastering
- Simon Hilliard – tape operator at Trident Studios
- Mike Donegani – tape operator at Trident Studios
- Reno Ruocco – tape operator at Trident Studios
- Ray Staff – mastering at Trident Studios
