= VI. "The Sphere A Kind of Dream" =

"The Sphere A Kind of Dream"
- Neil Peart's handwritten lyrics sheet

Song by Rush

from the album Hemispheres
- Released: October 24, 1978
- Recorded: June and July 1978
- Studio: Rockfield (Rockfield, Monmouthshire); Advision (London)
- Genre: Progressive rock
- Length: 1:02
- Label: Anthem
- Composers: Geddy Lee; Alex Lifeson
- Lyricist: Neil Peart
- Producers: Rush; Terry Brown

"Cygnus X-1 Book II: Hemispheres" chronology
V. "Cygnus Bringer of Balance" (1978)	VI. "The Sphere A Kind of Dream" (1978)

"The Sphere A Kind of Dream" (Note: The subtitle is formatted with italic type on the vinyl tracklist.) is the sixth and final movement of "Cygnus X-1 Book II: Hemispheres", the opening side-long suite of Canadian rock band Rush's sixth studio album Hemispheres (1978). The epic was penned by drummer Neil Peart and composed by bassist and lead vocalist Geddy Lee and guitarist Alex Lifeson. An acoustic guitar piece lasting just more than a minute, "The Sphere" presents the message of the story, promoting a balance between heart and mind into a "single, perfect sphere". The movement has garnered critical acclaim. However, the lyrics were interpreted differently between writers, ranging from a rejection of Peart's previous Ayn Rand-influenced politics to a promotion of authoritarianism.

== Background and composition ==
"Cygnus X-1 Book II: Hemispheres" was composed by bassist and lead vocalist Geddy Lee and guitarist Alex Lifeson, its lyrics penned by drummer Neil Peart. It was arranged and produced by the band and Terry Brown. It is the opening side-long suite of Hemispheres (1978), Rush's sixth studio album. The album was recorded in June and July 1978. The music was tracked at Rockfield Studios in Rockfield, Monmouthshire and the vocals Advision Studios in London. Trident Studios in Soho was the location of mixing in August.

After getting sucked into the black hole of Cygnus X-1 in the previous Cygnus X-1 suite, A Farewell to Kings (1977) closer "Cygnus X-1 Book I: The Voyage", the unnamed astronaut, with a memory and voice but no physical presence, finds himself in a world divided by the suite's titular "Hemispheres". These represent two battling factions for a different god, bringer of wisdom Apollo and bringer of love Dionysus. He is declared "God of Balance" by Apollo and Dionysus in the movement "Cygnus Bringer of Balance", leading into the sixth and final movement "The Sphere A Kind of Dream".

Lasting 18 full measures and a coda, "The Sphere A Kind of Dream" is played in D major and 4/4 following a chord progression of D–G–Bm–Asus_{4}–C♯m–G–Esus_{4}–E–F♯–D–G–Bm–A–A(add B)–C♯m–G–Bm–A–A(add B)–Cmaj_{7}–F–G–D. For little more than a minute, Lee, over a soft 12-string acoustic guitar and simple synthesizer, sings the suite's message, the importance of the balance and unity between heart and mind into a "single, perfect sphere": "Sensibility, armed with sense and liberty".

== Release ==
Hemispheres was released on October 24, 1978 by Anthem Records, the title suite taking up the A-side. The vinyl of Hemispheres correctly present the timestamps of the suite and its movement except the 1:02 "The Sphere", where it was marked as 1:06.

== Reception ==
In Hemispheres' initial reviews, Conrad Bibens wrote the end of the title suite showed Lee "can sing in a softer and more gentle vein", while Len Senecal criticized "The Sphere" as a "pseudo climax with an acoustic guitar and moralizing vocals". Decades later, Treble's Langdon Hickman claimed "Cygnus Bringer of Balance" and "The Sphere A Kind of Dream" "the strongest closing to an epic they ever pieced together, like the thesis statement of this phase of their career—a combination of Yes and Led Zeppelin cloaked in royal thunder". Both parts were also "noteworthy" of "Hemispheres" for James McCarthy, who wrote the book Rush: Changing Hemispheres (2012). Richard James and Jon Collins painted the sound and listening experience as "pretty", "melodic", and "like waking from a dream".

Treble's Langdon Hickman described its message as "New Age-y" and promoting a "naive sense of unmarked and nuanceless" balance. However, he acknowledged it "signals at least the development of ways of thinking about the world we live in and how we live and navigate within it that are less naive and simple and more dialectically engaged". He also marked it as a shift away from Ayn Rand's objectivism in Rush's politics. Collins similarly suggested the promotion of "collective individualism" ("We can walk our road together if our goals are all the same, we can run alone and free if we pursue a different aim") a "thinly-disguised" debunk of anti-socialist allegations made by journalists such as Barry Miles.

NME, in a contemporaneous review, highlighted the closing lines "Armed with sense and liberty/With the Heart and Mind united/In a single perfect sphere." Alex Body acclaimed the complexity of the line "Sensibility armed with sense and liberty", especially in comparison to what he perceived to be the simplicity of the stories of Rush's previous two side-long epics, "The Fountain of Lamneth" (1975) and "2112" (1976). Jeff Lasala, writing a feature on myths for science fiction magazine Reactor wrote the suite's final lines made the overall product "another sweet myth remade for the modern age".

Circus magazine's Bart Testa was disturbed by the lyrics' "ominous overtones of superhuman dictatorship, as if humankind were not fit to live its life without apocalyptic warriors from Above." He called this "rage for order" odd for a rock group. The line, "If our goals are all the same", in particular "suggests we'd all be led by a hero instead of a mere politician."

== Legacy ==
As part of her journey getting into Rush, experimental artist Fire-Toolz remembered reading the lyrics to "The Sphere" as an elementary school student "and for some reason, at such a young age, I knew exactly what the lyrics meant. Talking about the balance between heart and logic, or emotion and scientific thinking — that kind of left brain/right brain dichotomy." It heavily influenced her visual style, which she described as a combination of the balls of the cover art of Hold Your Fire (1987) and "The Sphere"'s lyrics.
