= IV. "Armageddon The Battle of Heart and Mind" =

"Armageddon The Battle of Heart and Mind"
- Visualizer for "Armageddon" released for the 40th Anniversary edition of Hemispheres, showing neurons lighting within the brain that is the song's subject matter

Composition by Rush

from the album Hemispheres
- Released: October 28, 1978
- Recorded: June and July 1978
- Studio: Rockfield (Rockfield, Monmouthshire); Advision (London)
- Genre: Progressive rock
- Length: 2:56
- Label: Anthem
- Composers: Geddy Lee; Alex Lifeson
- Lyricist: Neil Peart
- Producers: Rush; Terry Brown

"Cygnus X-1 Book II: Hemispheres" chronology
II. "Apollo Bringer of Wisdom" / III. "Dionysus Bringer of Love" (1978)	IV. "Armageddon The Battle of Heart and Mind" (1978)	V. "Cygnus Bringer of Balance" (1978)

"Armageddon The Battle of Heart and Mind" (Note: The subtitle is formatted in italic type in the vinyl tracklist.) is the fourth movement of "Cygnus X-1 Book II: Hemispheres", a suite by Canadian rock band Rush. "Hemispheres" was the side-long opening title track of their sixth studio album, released on October 28, 1978 by Anthem Records. Its lyrics were written by drummer Neil Peart and music composed by bassist and lead vocalist Geddy Lee and guitarist Alex Lifeson. It was arranged and produced by the band and Terry Brown.

"Armageddon The Battle of Heart and Mind", mostly in 12/8, is the climax of the story of "Hemispheres". The world was fractured into two groups of people, the titular Hemispheres, each supporting one god (Apollo, god of wisdom, and Dionysus, god of love) causing fear and confusion. Several writers on music highlighted how aspects of its composition and sound, including stereo phasing and odd time signatures, underscored the chaos of the situation. The connection between "Hemispheres" and "Cygnus X-1 Book I: The Voyage" (1977) is established; the unnamed astronaut who was sucked in Cygnus X-1's black hole in "The Voyage" survived.

== Background ==
Rush's sixth album Hemispheres (1978) was recorded in June and July 1978 under production of the band and Terry Brown. The music was recorded at Rockfield Studios, the location of previous album A Farewell to Kings (1977), the vocals at London's Advision Studios. In August, Brown also mixed the album at Trident Studios in Soho, where Ray Staff mastered.

The lyrics for the six-movement epic "Cygnus X-1 Book II: Hemispheres" were written by drummer Neil Peart and music composed by bassist and lead vocalist Geddy Lee and guitarist Alex Lifeson. It depicts two sides, one supporting "Apollo Bringer of Wisdom" and another "Dionysus Bringer of Love", divided between each other and in conflict until an invisible spirit resolves it by having both gods declare it "Cygnus Bringer of Balance".

The fourth movement, "Armaggedon The Battle of Heart and Mind", is the climax of the story. Peart explained his main goal writing the epic was to showcase "the battle" was not simply fictional but a major part of real life. "So much of what we do in a day," he explained, "is governed by an idea or feeling, and sometimes they can be battling each other."

Hemispheres was released on October 28, 1978 by Anthem Records; "Cygnus X-1 Book II: Hemispheres" opened the album, taking up its entire A-side. The promotional tours for Exit... Stage Left (1981) and Moving Pictures (1981) had a sole performance of "Armageddon" in its set list. One performance of the movement, as part of a medley, was at Maple Leaf Gardens on March 25, 1981 (the entire show dubbed "Live in YYZ 1981"). It was released in 5.1 Dolby surround sound on April 15, 2022 as part of the "Super Deluxe Edition" of the 40th Anniversary reissue series entry for Moving Pictures.

== Music ==
"Armageddon The Battle of Heart and Mind" (2:56) is composed in B major, using the chord progressions Bm(no 3rd)–Dm(no 3rd), A(add B)–Cmaj_{7}–Fmaj_{7} (a motif throughout the suite) and F♯_{7}–B. It is played at a medium tempo with a strong beat in 4. The movement's opening is a six-measure section repeated once. The first, third and fourth measures are in 12/8, the second in 9/8, and the fifth and sixth in 4/4. A guitar solo is performed on the second instance of the section. Lifeson's riffs move up and done, his guitar flanging and flowing between the left and right stereo channels.

"Armageddon" repeats the first theme introduced in "Prelude", which also concluded the preceding "Dionysus Bringer of Love", within itself. The composition also mostly consists of the second and third themes introduced in "Prelude". After the last vocal line, the movement ends with Lee's singular Oberheim line reinforcing the harmonic notion, accompanied by "fabulous" power chords. This leads into 11:48 of the suite, with the ascending eight-note riff taken from the second unnamed numbered movement of "Cygnus X-1 Book I: The Voyage".

== Lyrics ==
After the guitar solo, Lee sings about the universe being divided into the titular hemispheres, Apollonian and Dionysian groups of people, causing fear and confusion. As he narrates in what is close to the high-end of his vocal range, "The Universe divided as the heart and mind collided, with the people left unguided for so many trouble years. In a cloud of doubt and fears, their world was torn asunder into hollow hemispheres." However, a third group arose that did not follow either god and looked for balance. A connection to "The Voyage" is established, 10:57 into the suite. The perspective switches to the unnamed astronaut, who is revealed to survive getting sucked into the black hole of Cygnus X-1. His travels on the ship Rocinante took him to the divided world. The explorer narrates, "My Rocinante sailed by night on her final flight. To the heart of Cygnus' fearsome force, we set out course, spiralled through that timeless space to this immortal place."

== Reception ==
Upon the album's release, Creem magazine claimed "Armageddon" was "proof positive" that Hemispheres "the primo war concept album of the year". James McCarthy opined, "the idea of two sides of the brain at odds with each other, and the battle between heart and mind, was a fascinating concept to construct a song around." Durrell Bowman and Jim Berti, in the book Rush and Philosophy (2011), took "Armageddon" as an allegory for issues of self-identification in the individual. Love and reason became one-sided characteristics they were forced to fall into, making them "unhappy hemispheres, divided and in need of ultimate synthesis".

Cultural musicologist Durrell Bowman praised the group for creating a "relatively soulful, though usually also stylistically quite heavy, version of progressive rock" with "Armageddon". He labeled the establishment of the space traveler a showcase of Peart's left-wing libertarianism and "a new kind of mythology for the post-counterculture". The astronaut, who is himself a "martyr" for individualism, is potentially the combiner of heart and mind.

Martin Popoff described "Armageddon" as "pretty guitar-charged and dark although still prog, rife with time signature hiccups." Jeff Lasala, writing a feature on mythology for the science fiction magazine Reactor, labeled it a "whole wonderfully prog-rock operatic struggle". Alex Body noted the song's odd time signature "jarred" with the powerful groove, but interpreted it as signaling the fractured setting by Apollo and Dionysus' extreme philosophies. The unstable chords in "Armaggedon"'s first half, specifically the constant switching between major and minor chords, was also interpreted as signifying the conflict. The back half is composed in a more traditionally tonal manner. Bowman and Canadian ethnomusicologist Rob Bowman argued this underscored the themes of balance established in the two movements following "Armageddon".

Bill Banasiewicz, in his biography Visions, and Bowman noted the phasing, applied to the guitar solo and Lee's singing of the word "hemispheres", to the complete left and right channels in the stereo mix. They suggested it emphasized the conflict between both sides. Ryan Reed acclaimed the effect as "one of the coolest headphone Easter eggs in rock history".

== Personnel ==
Rush

- Geddy Lee – bass guitar, Minimoog synthesizer, Oberheim Polyphonic Synthesizer, Moog Taurus bass pedals, vocals
- Alex Lifeson – 6-and 12-string electric guitars
- Neil Peart – drums

Production

- Rush – production, arrangement
- Terry Brown – production, arrangement, mixing at Trident Studios
- Pat Moran – engineering at Rockfield Studios
- Declan O'Doherty – engineering at Advision Studios
- John Brand – mixing assistance at Trident Studios
- Ray Staff – mastering
- Simon Hilliard – tape operator at Trident Studios
- Mike Donegani – tape operator at Trident Studios
- Reno Ruocco – tape operator at Trident Studios
- Ray Staff – mastering at Trident Studios
