= All the World's a Stage (album) =

Live album by Rush
- Released: September 29, 1976
- Recorded: June 11–13, 1976
- Venues: Massey Hall, Toronto
- Genres: Progressive rock; hard rock; heavy metal
- Length: 79:32
- Label: Mercury
- Producers: Rush, Terry Brown

Rush chronology
2112 (1976)	All the World's a Stage (1976)	A Farewell to Kings (1977)

Singles from All the World's a Stage
- 1. "Fly by Night/In the Mood (Live)" Released: December 1976

Professional ratings
Review scores
Source	Rating
AllMusic	link
Collector's Guide to Heavy Metal	8/8
The Encyclopedia of Popular Music	2/5 stars
The Essential Rock Discography	8/10
MusicHound Rock	4/5 stars
The Rolling Stone Album Guide	link
The Virgin Encyclopedia of 80s Music	2/5 stars

All the World's a Stage is a double live album and the first collection of live recordings by Canadian rock band Rush, released on September 29, 1976 by Mercury Records. The album was released after the breakthrough success of their fourth studio album, 2112 (1976), and was recorded at Massey Hall in Toronto on June 11–13, 1976, during the 2112 tour. The title of the album alludes to William Shakespeare's play As You Like It. In Europe, the album was released in March 1977.

== Content ==
According to lead vocalist and bassist Geddy Lee, the release of a live album in late 1976 "was definitely something we used to buy us more time" as Rush worked on the studio follow-up to their commercial breakthrough album, 2112, released earlier that same year.

This album captures the setlist that Rush regularly performed when it headlined shows during the 2112 tour. Because vinyl records could only carry about 20 minutes per side, the positions of "Lakeside Park" and "2112" were swapped with "Fly By Night / In The Mood" and "Something For Nothing".

While performing the song "2112" during this tour, the band chose to omit the "Oracle: The Dream" section and all but the final 32 seconds of the "Discovery", which are played as a lead-in to "Presentation", although the liner notes and track listing do not indicate this. While the entirety of "Discovery" would be performed during the A Farewell To Kings tour of 1977-78 and Hemispheres tour of 1978–79, Rush would first perform the entire suite live during the Test for Echo tour of 1996–97, as documented on the live album Different Stages.

Alternate recordings of "2112" and "Something For Nothing" from the June 11–13 performances were released as part of the 2112: 40th Anniversary box set in 2016.

According to the liner notes, All the World's a Stage marks the end of the "first chapter of Rush". The band would release a live album after every four studio albums until 2003, then released a live album and DVD after each studio album's tour.

Fellow Toronto band Max Webster was the opening act for all three shows from which this album was compiled.

The lyrics to Rush's 1981 song "Limelight" also includes the words "All the world's a stage".

== Reception ==
All the World's a Stage was Rush's first US Top 40-charting album and went gold, alongside A Farewell to Kings and 2112, on November 16, 1977. It was certified platinum in the United States in 1981 after the release of Moving Pictures. In Canada, Gold certification came on December 1, 1976, and platinum on August 1, 1978.

== Reissues ==
The live version of "What You're Doing" was included on the 1990 compilation Chronicles.

A remaster was issued in 1997.

- The tray has a picture of the star with man painting (mirroring the cover art of Retrospective I) with "The Rush Remasters" printed in all capital letters just to the left. All remasters from Rush through Permanent Waves are like this.
- The original CD omitted "What You're Doing" and the post-show chatter because CDs could hold only 75 minutes at the time. By 1997, advances in recording technology had increased that to 80 minutes; the missing song and chatter are included in the remaster.
- The album's original triple gatefold artwork with concert pictures is included with the remaster.

All the World's a Stage was remastered again in 2011 by Andy VanDette for the "Sector" box sets, which re-released all of Rush's Mercury-era albums. All the World's a Stage is included in the Sector 1 set.

All the World's a Stage was remastered for vinyl in 2015 by Sean Magee at Abbey Road Studios as a part of the official "12 Months of Rush" promotion. The high-definition master prepared for this release was also sold in 24-bit/96 kHz and 24-bit/192 kHz formats, at several high-resolution audio online music stores. These masters have less dynamic range compression than the 1997 remasters and the "Sector" remasters by VanDette.

== Track listing ==
All lyrics are written by Neil Peart; all music is composed by Geddy Lee and Alex Lifeson, except where noted.

Side one
No.	Title	Writer(s)	Length
1.	"Bastille Day"		4:57
2.	"Anthem"		4:56
3.	"Fly by Night"/"In the Mood"	Peart, Lee/Lee	5:03
4.	"Something for Nothing"	Lee, Peart	4:02

Side two
No.	Title	Length
1.	"Lakeside Park"	5:04
2.	"2112" I. "Overture" II. "The Temples of Syrinx" III. "Presentation" (Lifeson, Peart) IV. "Soliloquy" V. "Grand Finale"	15:45

Side three
No.	Title	Writer(s)	Length
1.	"By-Tor and the Snow Dog"		11:57
2.	"In the End"	Lifeson, Lee	7:13

Side four
No.	Title	Writer(s)	Length
1.	"Working Man"/"Finding My Way"	Lifeson, Lee/Lifeson, Lee	14:56
2.	"What You're Doing"	Lifeson, Lee	5:39

- Track 1 includes a Peart drum solo

== Personnel ==
Rush

- Geddy Lee – vocals, bass guitar
- Alex Lifeson – guitars
- Neil Peart – drums, percussion

Production

- Rush – production
- Terry Brown – production, engineering, mixing
- Ken Morris – tape operator
- George Graves at JAMF – original mastering
- David Street – photography
- Hugh Syme – design
- Ray Danniels and Vic Wilson, SRO Productions – management
- Moon Records – executive production

== Charts ==
Chart (1976–1977)	Peak position
Canada Top Albums/CDs (RPM)	6
US Billboard 200	40

== Certifications ==
Region	Certification	Certified units/sales
Canada (Music Canada)	Platinum	100,000^{^}
United Kingdom (BPI)	Silver	60,000^{^}
United States (RIAA)	Platinum	1,000,000^{^}
^{^} Shipments figures based on certification alone.
