= A Farewell to Kings (song) =

1978 single B-side by Rush

- B-side of Anthem's single release for "Cinderella Man"

Single by Rush

from the album A Farewell to Kings
- A-side: "Cinderella Man"
- Released: 1978
- Recorded: 1977
- Studio: Rockfield Studios
- Genre: Progressive rock; hard rock
- Length: 5:51
- Label: Anthem
- Composers: Neil Peart; Geddy Lee; Alex Lifeson
- Lyricist: Neil Peart
- Producers: Rush; Terry Brown

Rush Canadian 7" singles chronology
"Circumstances" / "The Trees" (1978)	"Cinderella Man" / "A Farewell to Kings" (1978)	"The Spirit of Radio" / "Circumstances"" (1980)

Music video
- "A Farewell to Kings" on YouTube

Music video
- "A Farewell to Kings (lyric version)" on YouTube

"A Farewell to Kings" is a song by the Canadian progressive rock band Rush. It was released as the title track to their 1977 album A Farewell to Kings. A music video to the song was uploaded to YouTube in March 2018.

"A Farewell to Kings" is about dealing with hypocrisy, and finding your own way by looking within yourself.

== Composition and recording ==
The guitar played in the beginning of "A Farewell to Kings" was recorded outside. Frontman Geddy Lee said that "the acoustic was recorded out there to get that really crisp sound and I remember Alex was walking around this mic that Terry had set up while he was playing. He was just like a troubadour – he was playing as he walked around and, naturally, every troubadour has his guy trailing behind him playing a Minimoog!"

Lee also said that the song "was quite a different piece for us, because of the way the intro’s structured, and then it comes in with a bang and there’s this weird time signature going on. It’s a tough song to play."

Robert Telleria in the book Merely Players tells of the song:

The title is adapted from Ernest Hemingway's novel A Farewell to Arms. Longing for a new Renaissance era (which focused on our place in the cosmos), this revolution is more down to earth, the new world envisioned in "2112", a timeless realm. As in "2112", the wise are again resented, and the sacred "Halls of Truth" are the churches, courthouses, and schools. The hypocrites are the elite: teachers, lawyers, and clergy.

== Reception ==
Ultimate Classic Rock ranked "A Farewell to Kings" number 4 on their list of "All 167 Rush Songs Ranked Worst to Best".

AllMusic reviewer Greg Prato picked the "A Farewell to Kings" as one of the highlights on the album, and called the song's intro "a tasty classical guitar/synth passage, before erupting into a powerful rocker."
