= Bell tree =

Percussion instrument

- A simple bell tree, with holder

Percussion instrument
- Classification: Idiophone
- Hornbostel–Sachs classification: 111.242.221 (Sets of hanging bells without internal strikers)

A bell tree, also known as tree bells or Chinese bell tree (often confused with the mark tree), is a percussion instrument, consisting of vertically nested inverted metal bowls. The bowls, placed on a vertical rod, are arranged roughly in order of pitch. The number of bowls can vary between approximately 14 and 28. An effective glissando is produced by sliding a triangle beater, a glockenspiel mallet, or a xylophone mallet down the length of the tree. The bells are usually pitched to microtonal intervals and do not represent any formal scale. When a glissando is played, the inexactness of the order of the bowls' pitch is unnoticeable, merely creating a fuller sound.

The bell tree is often used to accentuate the start or end of passages of music with a "bright", "shimmer" effect, adding complexity.

Chick Corea and his group Return To Forever occasionally used the bell tree (i.e. album Hymn of the Seventh Galaxy), as has the group Santana. Isaac Howie has sometimes used the bell tree in his compositions. The rock band America utilized one in "Bell Tree," a song named for the instrument, found on their 1975 album Hearts. Neil Peart from Rush used this instrument for the song "The Trees" from the album Hemispheres (1978), as can be seen on the official music video of the song, and the live album Exit... Stage Left.
