= Hemispheres (Rush album) =

1978 studio album by Rush

Studio album by Rush
- Released: October 24, 1978
- Recorded: June–July 1978
- Studios: Rockfield (Rockfield, Wales, United Kingdom); Advision (London, England, United Kingdom)
- Genre: Progressive rock
- Length: 36:08
- Label: Anthem
- Producers: Rush; Terry Brown

Rush chronology
A Farewell to Kings (1977)	Hemispheres (1978)	Rush Through Time (1979)

Singles from Hemispheres
- 1. "Circumstances" / "The Trees" Released: January 1979 (Note: "Circumstances" A-side for Canada. "The Trees" A-side for the US)

Alternative cover
- 40th anniversary reissue

Hemispheres is the sixth studio album by the Canadian rock band Rush, released on October 24, 1978, by Anthem Records in Canada and Mercury Records elsewhere. After the commercial and critical success of A Farewell to Kings (1977), the band returned to Rockfield Studios in Wales to record the follow-up with long-time co-producer Terry Brown. The recording process was notoriously difficult, with the band spending several weeks writing and arranging the material in the studio—a departure from their usual practice of entering sessions with completed songs.

The album is considered a peak of the band's progressive rock period, characterised by complex time signatures and multi-part suites. The first side of the original vinyl is occupied by the 18-minute epic "Cygnus X-1 Book II: Hemispheres", which concludes the story left as a cliff-hanger on A Farewell to Kings of a space explorer who is drawn into a black hole and is caught in a struggle between the Greek gods Apollo and Dionysus. These themes of duality are depicted on the cover artwork by Hugh Syme. Side two features the singles "Circumstances" and "The Trees", giving the band greater FM radio airplay, and concludes with the nearly ten-minute instrumental "La Villa Strangiato", which the band cited as their most technically challenging piece to record at the time.

Upon release, Hemispheres reached No. 14 on both the Canadian and UK charts and peaked at No. 47 on the US Billboard 200. It was certified silver in the UK and eventually achieved platinum status in both Canada and the United States. While contemporary critics were divided over the complexity of the long-form tracks, retrospective reviews have hailed the album as a definitive progressive rock masterpiece. The intense sessions for the album left the band exhausted and directly influenced their subsequent shift toward the more concise, radio-friendly arrangements found on their next album, Permanent Waves (1980).

== Background and recording ==
In May 1978, Rush finished touring A Farewell to Kings, which contributed to their breakthrough in the UK market, following a series of well-received shows and "Closer to the Heart", the lead single from the album, reaching No. 36 in the UK. Following a dedicated rest period, the band regrouped to produce a follow-up album and returned to Rockfield Studios in Monmouthshire, Wales, to record as they had enjoyed making A Farewell to Kings at the facility. Bassist and vocalist Geddy Lee said recording in the United States did not appeal to the group, and since they were influenced by many English bands, recording in the UK was an attractive idea. In a departure from previous albums, the band entered the songwriting process without any preconceived ideas. They rented a farmhouse close to the studio for two weeks of intensive writing and rehearsals, during which the trio had concerns over the direction the new album was to take.

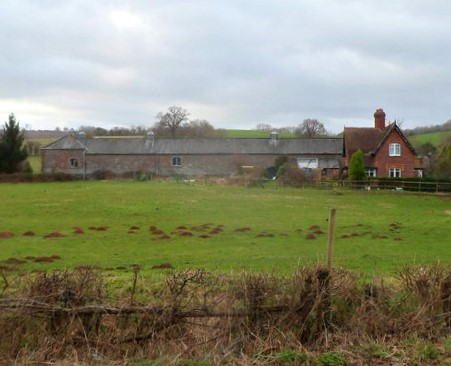
Rockfield Studios

Hemispheres was recorded in June and July 1978, then the longest amount of time Rush had to record an album–in comparison, 1976's 2112 was recorded in five weeks and A Farewell to Kings in four. Rush were joined by long-time co-producer Terry Brown, also credited as co-arranger, and engineer Pat Moran. The conditions of the studio lacked the standard facilities, including a sofa. Lee described it as "really funky". In one incident, a latch that failed to shut the studio doors frustrated Lifeson who, in a fit, took it off, installed a hydraulic door opener and built a handle on it. The album was recorded in sections at a time with the three members playing simultaneously. Rush could only put down the music in their allocated slot at Rockfield due to the time required to arrange the tracks, so they booked Advision Studios in Fitzrovia, London, to record the vocals. They had enjoyed the experience of mixing A Farewell to Kings there, and wanted to return as it was where Yes had recorded their favourite albums. Upon entering Advision, however, Lee had only sung the lyrics in basic form as the songs were being written acoustically, and the group carried on thinking he could sing them confidently. "So we never really checked the keys that the songs were written in. And when I went to sing them, they were in such difficult keys for me to sing, that's why I'm singing so high." The process was frustrating for Lee, who had several blowouts during vocal takes and had to go for walks to calm down.

Once recording was complete, mixing was undertaken by Brown and assistant John Brand at Advision. After around two-and-a-half weeks, the pair had encountered problems and were unable to produce a satisfactory mix, which led to the decision to briefly return to Canada as the band had been away from home for several months. They returned to London in August, this time to Trident Studios in Soho, where a mix was finalised. The album cost an estimated CAN$100,000 to make, the most expensive Rush album at the time. In the three-month period of putting it together, the band had just one day off and took a six-week vacation once complete to recover. Lee looked back on the album in 2018, and said the band "greatly underestimated the level of overachievement that we were shooting for".

== Songs ==
=== Side one ===
Side one is occupied by "Cygnus X-1 Book II: Hemispheres", an 18-minute sequel to "Cygnus X-1 Book I: The Voyage" on A Farewell to Kings which had ended on a cliffhanger. Book I concerns an unnamed space explorer who travels to Cygnus X-1, a black hole, in his space ship and is pulled into it. In Book II, his wandering soul emerges into Olympus, who witnesses the gods Apollo and Dionysus caught in the struggle between mind and heart, the two leading types of people: those who follow science and knowledge and build cities but with no emotional attachment, and those who live in forests but experience love. The clash leads to the world splintered into different hemispheres, and a silent scream from the explorer is heard by the two gods who reconsider and unite. They name the explorer Cygnus, the god of balance, and the world is restored with truth and love co-existing.

Initially, Lee had a different idea for the album's centerpiece track, but after some music had been written the group felt it right to continue the "Cygnus X-1" story. Peart started to outline the story and lyrics to Book II three weeks before the band left for Rockfield. The process was stressful for him, which took "hours of tearing my hair out", and was only half complete when they arrived at the studio. The sequel, like Book I, uses mythology and symbolism to depict a conflict between the gods Apollo and Dionysus, which is resolved when Cygnus intervenes, claiming a balance of heart and mind are what is needed for humans to live well. Peart introduced the gong and timpani to his percussion set for the first time; he hadn't thought of adding the instrument on previous albums but thought it was needed for Hemispheres.

=== Side two ===
"Circumstances" is the first of two shorter tracks on Hemispheres. With the band having accustomed its audience to longer, more elaborate formats, this song is qualified by Lee as an experiment, an attempt to break away from the prog formula that would steer the band into new directions in later albums.

"The Trees" tells the story of an upheaval in a forest of oak and maple trees, where the maples think the oaks grow too large and take all the sunlight. The maples form a union in an effort to have the oaks cut down to a smaller size, but in the end all the trees are kept equal by cutting tools made by humans. Lee said the Welsh countryside set the overall tone for the song: "You're watching English television, walking in the Welsh countryside; there are sheep talking to you in the early morning when you're trying to sleep ... lyrics came first, and we wanted to construct a dynamic little tale as a soundtrack to those lyrics". Peart took inspiration from a cartoon he saw of trees "carrying on like fools", and wrote a lyric based around the idea of trees acting like people. He later described the song as a parable about Collectivism, an idea addressed by novelist Ayn Rand.

The nine-minute "La Villa Strangiato" (subtitled "An Exercise in Self-Indulgence") is the first instrumental that Rush recorded, and has 12 distinct sections. The piece is what Lifeson described as a "musical re-creation" of the various nightmares he had, particularly while he was on tour. It was the sole piece that developed from the two-week rehearsal period the group had prior to entering the studio. The band encountered great difficulty in recording it as they wanted it put down as a single live performance, rather than a more produced and edited piece. Lee said it took as many as 40 takes to produce one that they were satisfied with, and he and Peart pointed out that they spent more time recording "La Villa Strangiato" than their second album, Fly by Night. Peart recalled the group spent four days and nights playing it repeatedly, playing even when tired and with sore hands: "We were determined to get the whole thing perfect, but in the end I just couldn't do it, and we ended up putting it together from a few different takes." The segments "Monsters!" and "Monsters! (Reprise)" are taken from "Powerhouse", a 1937 jazz instrumental by Raymond Scott.

== Artwork ==
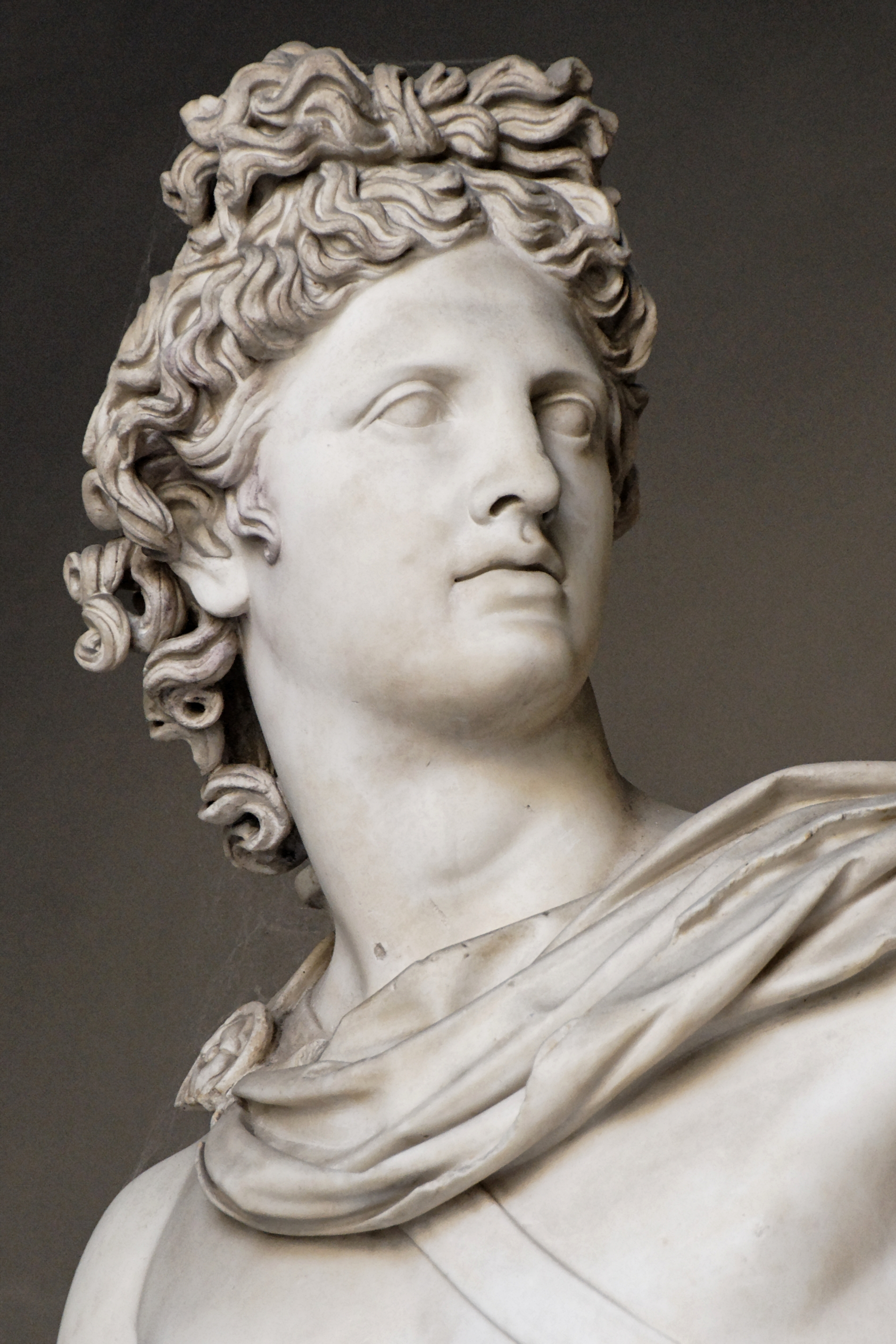
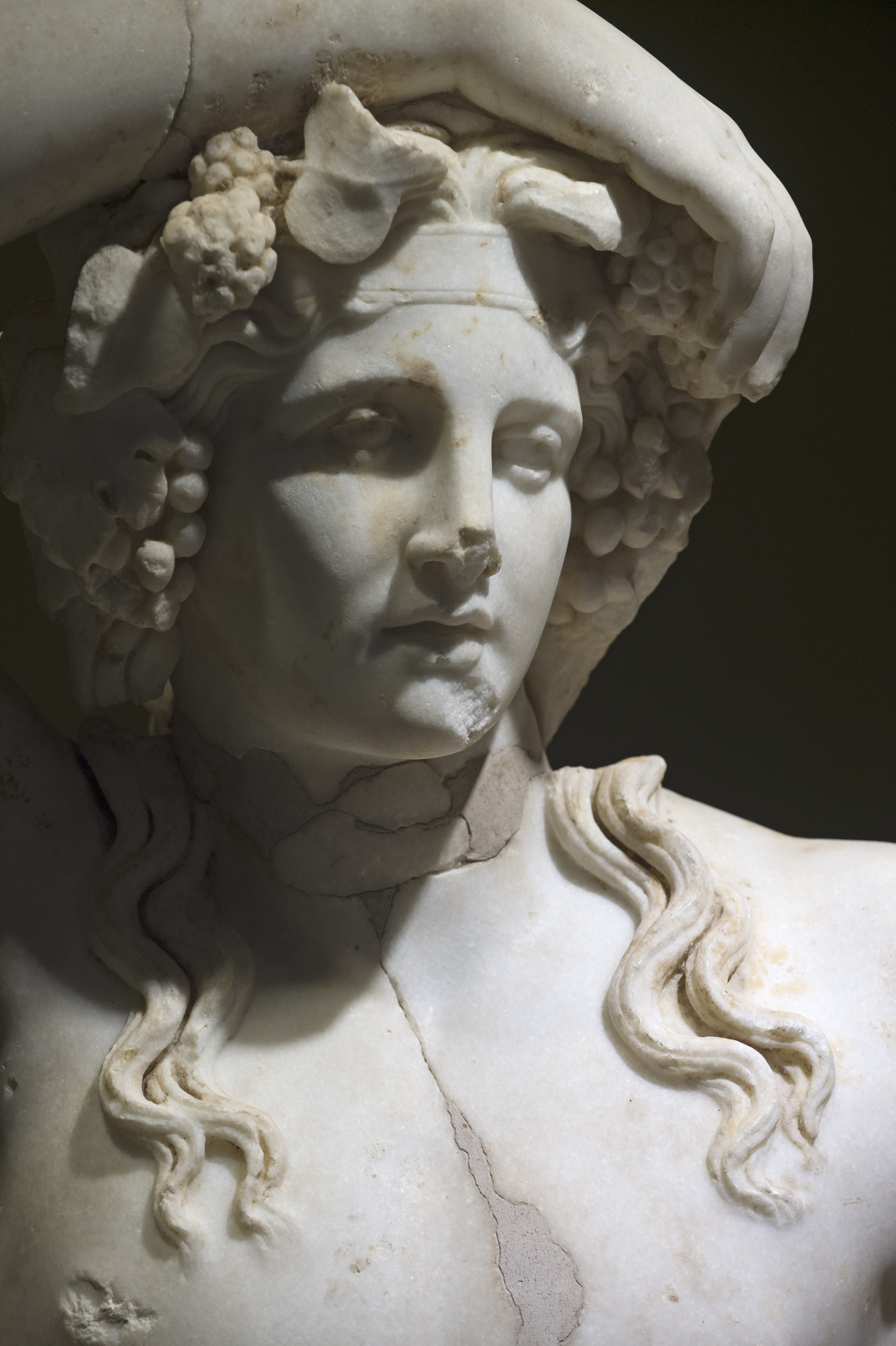
The duality concept of Apollo (left), and of Dionysus (right) addressed on "Cygnus X-1 Book II: Hemispheres" is represented on the front cover artwork.

The cover was designed by longtime Rush collaborator, graphic artist Hugh Syme. The front depicts a figure that resembles the one in the painting The Son of Man by surreal artist René Magritte who is standing on the left side of a human brain. He is looking in the direction of a nude man in a ballet pose who is standing on the right side. The overall image was Syme's own creation, but it developed from discussions with Peart about the left and right and the Apollonian and Dionysian parts of the brain, itself a theme covered in Peart's lyrics to "Cygnus X-1 Book II: Hemispheres". The Magritte figure is Syme's longtime friend Bobby King, who was also the nude model for Rush's Starman logo on 2112 that Syme had also designed. The naked male is a dancer from the Toronto Ballet School. The brain was loaned to Syme from the Department of Anatomy at the University of Toronto Faculty of Medicine for him to photograph and the final design was completed with a composite. The background was a combination of airbrush and paint. Syme started working on the design before he had heard any music on the album.

== Release ==
Prior to its release, Hemispheres aired in its entirety on Rick Ringer's radio show on CHUM-FM in Toronto, on October 5, 1978, with the band as studio guests. Its release in stores followed on October 24, and reached number 14 on the Canadian Albums Chart and UK Albums Chart, and number 47 on the US Billboard 200. For a short time, Hemispheres was released in Canada on red vinyl with a gatefold sleeve with a poster and as a limited edition picture disc.

The album had a strong impact upon release, and marked the first time Rush received widespread FM radio exposure helped by "Circumstances" and "The Trees" being shorter and radio friendly. The album reached Platinum in Canada and Gold in the US by mid-December 1978, and Silver in the UK. It proved to be a steady seller in the band's catalogue, reaching Platinum certification in the US in 1993 for selling one million copies, 15 years after its release.

Shortly after Hemispheres was released, Lee said the band intended to "break tradition" and avoid long, conceptual pieces on their next album.

== Reception ==
Contemporaneous and retrospective reviews
Review scores
Source	Rating
AllMusic	4/5 stars
Collector's Guide to Heavy Metal	6/10
The Encyclopedia of Popular Music	2/5 stars
The Essential Rock Discography	6/10
MusicHound Rock	2/5 stars
Rolling Stone	(2018)
The Rolling Stone Album Guide	2/5 stars
Sound & Vision	5/5 stars
Sounds	3/5 stars
The Virgin Encyclopedia of 80s Music	2/5 stars

Nevada State Journal's Pat O'Driscoll, who had a prejudice against power trios and initially thought of Rush as another "uppity heavy metal band that mechanically ground out mindless drivel", had his expectations exceeded with Hemispheres.

Geoff Barton gave Hemispheres three stars in Sounds in an article where he pondered if it "is a masterwork or a mistake". On one hand, he said the album is "a lovingly crafted, highly complex album ... brimful with profound lyrical statements" and "music with a message (trite but true)". But on the other, Barton thought it finds Rush "wallowing way, way out of their depth ... it seems impossible to think that this band were once honest, unpretentious purveyors of straight-forward, hard-hitting heavy metal music. Now, having forsaken basic beginnings. Rush sound ambitious beyond their musical means." In a review for Circus magazine, Bart Testa wrote the band plays "stupendous fanfare music" and noted their positive sentiments in the songs. He favoured "Cygnus X-1 Book II" over the side-long suite on 2112 as it showcased a better performance from the band, noting their ability to "interlock metal whirlwinds" driven by Peart's drumming. However, Testa noted "Circumstances" was the only one true "song" on the record, "and it's not very good, either."

O'Driscoll praised Rush for dispensing traditional philosophy in a manner that would appeal a hard rock/heavy metal genre, with "simple-yet-intricate words with occasional sly twists". Joe Nick Patoski, in the American rock magazine Creem, called the lyrical subject "timely and illuminating", and in presenting them, "they're not fascists, mutilators, or apologists, or even too weird. Just the stuff America needs to nudge its way into the 80s."

Similar to their other albums, reviewers thought highly of Rush's instrumental performances. O'Driscoll suggested Lee's "defiant cackle" suited Peart's "thundering percussion" and Lifeson's "slick lead guitar work". Patoski analogized the experience as being in college as a student intrigued by "a professor like Renaissance dude Neil Peart or even a T.A. who could play guitar with the destroyer aplomb of Alex Lifeson".

The album gained further critical acclaim retrospectively. In a poll held by Rolling Stone titled "Readers' Poll: Your Favorite Prog Rock Albums of All Time" in 2012, Hemispheres was ranked at No. 8. Reviewing the album for the magazine, Michael Bloom stated, "Overall, especially in 'La Villa Strangiato', Lifeson, Peart and Lee prove themselves masters of every power-trio convention. In fact, these guys have the chops and drive to break out of the largely artificial bounds of the format, and they constantly threaten to do so but never quite manage." In the review for AllMusic, Greg Prato favourably compared the album to the band's previous work, "While the story line isn't as comprehensible as 2112 was, it's much more consistent musically, twisting and turning through five different sections which contrast heavy rock sections against more sedate pieces." PopMatters ranked Hemispheres the 12th best progressive rock album of all time.

In 2023, John Cunningham of WhatCulture wrote: "Prog rock never got quite so conceptually insane as the 18-minute intro track on Rush's 1978 LP. [...] As the '80s rolled in, Rush bid farewell to the more over the top set pieces of their earlier years. Hemispheres is a near-perfect showcase of their ambitious '70s run before they arguably reached their peak in the decade after."

== Tour ==
Rush supported the album with a 137-date tour of Canada, the US, and Europe between October 1978 and June 1979. It marked the band performing longer sets and in larger venues across Canada, including three sold out dates at Maple Leaf Gardens in Toronto in December 1978, culminating in a show on New Year's Eve. The stage set improved, this time with more sophisticated lighting and triple the amount of video projection compared to their last tour, including a film to illustrate the story of "Cygnus X-1". Rush were in considerable financial debt at the start of the tour, and Peart said they hoped to pay it off using receipts from the first leg and make a profit on the second. The group would not tour with a profit until their next album, Permanent Waves.

== Reissues ==
Reissues
Year	Label	Format	Notes
1987	Anthem	CD	
1997	Anthem	CD	Digitally remastered
2011	Anthem	CD	Digitally remastered
2013	Audio Fidelity	SACD	Digitally remastered
2015	Mercury	LP	Digitally remastered, 200 g audiophile vinyl. Also available in 24-bit/96 kHz and 24-bit/192 kHz digital formats.
2018	Anthem/Mercury	CD, LP	40th Anniversary Edition with previously unreleased live content.

== Track listing ==
All lyrics are written by Neil Peart; all music is composed by Geddy Lee and Alex Lifeson, except "La Villa Strangiato" written by Lee, Lifeson, and Peart. All tracks arranged by Rush and Terry Brown.

Side one
No.	Title	Length
1.	"Cygnus X-1 Book II: Hemispheres" (Note: The subtitle of each movement name is listed on the vinyl in italic type, but non-existent on the back of the CD.): I. "Prelude" (4:29); II. "Apollo Bringer of Wisdom" (2:30); III. "Dionysus Bringer of Love" (2:06) (Note: On the vinyl, "Apollo Bringer of Wisdom" and "Dionysus Bringer of Love" are listed as individual sections, but their separate lengths are not given. Instead, a length combination of both sections, 4:36, is given at the end of the line for "Dionysus". Additionally, on the CD, the whole track is listed as five sections, with the "Apollo" and "Dionysus" parts marked as one named "Apollo/Dionysus" with the same combo length.); IV. "Armageddon The Battle of Heart and Mind" (2:56); V. "Cygnus Bringer of Balance" (5:01); VI. "The Sphere A Kind of Dream" (1:02 (Note: The vinyl misprints the length of "The Sphere A Kind of Dream" as 1:06, while the CD provides the correct one.))	18:04

Side two
No.	Title	Length
1.	"Circumstances"	3:42
2.	"The Trees"	4:46
3.	"La Villa Strangiato (An Exercise in Self-Indulgence)" (instrumental): I. "Buenos Nochas, Mein Froinds!" (0:27); II. "To Sleep, Perchance to Dream..." (1:33); III. "Strangiato Theme" (1:16); IV. "A Lerxst in Wonderland" (2:33); V. "Monsters!" (0:21); VI. "The Ghost of the Aragon" (0:35); VII. "Danforth and Pape" (0:41); VIII. "The Waltz of the Shreves" (0:26); IX. "Never Turn Your Back on a Monster!" (0:11); X. "Monsters! (Reprise)" (0:14); XI. "Strangiato Theme (Reprise)" (1:03); XII. "A Farewell to Things" (0:15)	9:35

=== 40th Anniversary Edition (2018) ===
Disc two: Live at Pinkpop Festival (June 4, 1979)
No.	Title	Lyrics	Music	Length
1.	"A Passage to Bangkok"			4:03
2.	"Xanadu"			12:32
3.	"The Trees"			5:10
4.	"Cygnus X-1 Book II: Hemispheres - The Sphere (A Kind of Dream)"			0:54
5.	"Closer to the Heart"	Peart, Peter Talbot		3:16
6.	"La Villa Strangiato"			11:22
7.	"In the Mood"	Lee	Lee	2:37
8.	"Drum Solo"		Peart	7:31
9.	"Something for Nothing"		Lee	4:21
10.	"2112" (Note: recorded live May 28, 1979, at Stadthalle Offenbach, West Germany; incorrectly credited as Live in Arizona: November 20, 1978): I. "Overture" (4:48); II. "The Temples of Syrinx" (2:26); III. "Discovery" (3:08); IV. "Presentation" (4:01); VI. "Soliloquy" (2:30); VII. "Grand Finale" (2:53)			19:46

== Personnel ==
Credits are adapted from the album's sleeve notes.

Rush

- Geddy Lee – bass guitar, Minimoog synthesizer, Oberheim Polyphonic Synthesizer, Moog Taurus bass pedals, vocals
- Alex Lifeson – 6- and 12-string electric and acoustic guitars, classical guitar, Roland guitar synthesizer, Moog Taurus pedals
- Neil Peart – drums, orchestra bells, bell tree, tympani, gong, cowbells, temple blocks, wind chimes, crotales

Production

- Rush – production, arrangements
- Terry Brown – production, arrangements, mixing at Trident Studios
- Pat Moran – engineering at Rockfield Studios
- Declan O'Doherty – engineering at Advision Studios
- John Brand – mixing assistance at Trident Studios
- Simon Hilliard – tape operator at Trident Studios
- Mike Donegani – tape operator at Trident Studios
- Reno Ruocco – tape operator at Trident Studios
- Ray Staff – original mastering at Trident Studios
- Yosh Inouye – cover photography
- Fin Costello – inner sleeve and poster photography
- Hugh Syme – graphics, art direction
- Bob King – art direction
- Ray Danniels and Vic Wilson, SRO Productions – management
- Moon Records – executive production

== Charts ==
Chart (1978)	Peak position
Canada Top Albums/CDs (RPM)	14
Dutch Albums (Album Top 100)	178
UK Albums (Official Charts)	14
US Billboard 200	47
Chart (2018)	Peak position
Scottish Albums (Official Charts)	48
UK Progressive Albums (Official Charts)	5
UK Rock & Metal Albums (Official Charts)	3
US Top Hard Rock Albums (Billboard)	19
US Indie Store Album Sales (Billboard)	6

== Certifications ==
Region	Certification	Certified units/sales
Canada (Music Canada)	Platinum	100,000^{^}
United Kingdom (BPI)	Silver	60,000^{^}
United States (RIAA)	Platinum	1,000,000^{^}
^{^} Shipments figures based on certification alone.
