= Xanadu (Rush song) =

Song by Rush

Song by Rush

from the album A Farewell to Kings
- Released: August 29, 1977
- Recorded: 1977
- Venue: Rockfield Studios
- Genre: Progressive rock
- Length: 11:05
- Label: Mercury Records
- Composers: Geddy Lee, Alex Lifeson
- Lyricist: Neil Peart
- Producers: Rush, Terry Brown

Music video
- "Xanadu" on YouTube

"Xanadu" is a song by the Canadian progressive rock band Rush from their 1977 album A Farewell to Kings. It is approximately eleven minutes long, beginning with a five-minute-long instrumental section before transitioning to a narrative written by Neil Peart, which in turn was inspired by the Samuel Taylor Coleridge poem Kubla Khan.

== Lyrics ==
In Peart's lyrics, the narrator describes searching for a place called "Xanadu" that will grant him immortality. After succeeding in this quest, a thousand years pass, and the narrator is left "waiting for the world to end," describing himself as "a mad immortal man."

The song is based on the poem Kubla Khan, written by Samuel Taylor Coleridge. Although the song does not explicitly state where "Xanadu" is, references to Kubla Khan imply that it is a mythical place based on Shangdu, the historical summer capital of the Mongol Empire.

== Music ==
"Xanadu" was the first Rush song in which synthesizers play an integral part. Unlike the previous albums, 2112 and Caress of Steel, "Xanadu" uses both guitar and synthesizer effects.

The song also marks Rush's clear foray into program music, although previous albums had displayed some elements of this. Subsequent albums during the late 1970s and early 1980s would see the group explore program music more systematically.

"Xanadu" requires each band member to utilize an array of instruments to effect the performance. Alex Lifeson used a Gibson EDS-1275 double-neck guitar (one twelve-string, the other six-string) as well as synthesizer pedals; Geddy Lee made use of a double-necked Rickenbacker 4080/12 guitar (four-string bass and twelve-string guitar), as well as extensive synthesizer arrangements (through both pedals and manual keyboards) in addition to singing; and Peart took on various percussion instruments (temple blocks, tubular bells, bell tree, glockenspiel, and wind chimes) in addition to his drum kit.

Despite its complexity and length, "Xanadu" was recorded in a single, uninterrupted take. According to Alex Lifeson, "Xanadu was well rehearsed before going to Rockfield, I remember that. On the day we recorded it, Pat Moran, the resident engineer, set all the mics up and we ran the song down, partially to get balances and tones. Because it was a long song, we didn't need to complete that test run. We then played it a second time from top to bottom and that's what you hear on the album. Needless to say, Pat was shocked that we ran an 11-minute song down in one complete take. Practice doesn't always make perfect, but it sure helps!"

== Live performance ==
The song was played live by the band on every tour since its release, up until the Grace Under Pressure Tour, when it was dropped. The following two tours did not feature the song, and then the next three tours featured the song. The following two tours did not feature the song, and then it was put back in the setlist during the R30 Tour. The song was then dropped for the following three tours before being played one final time on the R40 Live Tour.

All tours up until the Roll the Bones Tour had the song played in full. An abbreviated version was played on the Roll the Bones Tour and Counterparts Tour. Another abbreviated version of the song, omitting the second verse and Lee's rhythm guitar part during the ending, was performed as part of a medley during the R30 tour. However, for the R40 Live Tour, the band played the entire song with the rhythm guitar included.

In 2026, the band, with Anika Nilles as their touring drummer, used "Xanadu" as the opening song for their Fifty Something Tour as of August 13, 2026.

== Reception ==
In a Rolling Stone readers' poll to determine the top 10 Rush songs of all time, "Xanadu" was ranked at number six.

== See also ==
- List of songs recorded by Rush
