= Cygnus X-1 (song series) =

Two-part song series by Canadian progressive rock band Rush

- Limited edition EP cover

Suite by Rush

from the album A Farewell to Kings (Book I) Hemispheres (Book II)
- Released: August 29, 1977 (Book I); October 24, 1978 (Book II)
- Genre: Progressive rock; progressive metal
- Length: 10:25 (Book I); 18:07 (Book II); 28:32 (both songs)
- Label: Mercury
- Composers: Geddy Lee; Alex Lifeson; Neil Peart
- Lyricist: Neil Peart
- Producers: Rush; Terry Brown

Rush suite chronology
"2112" (1976)	"Cygnus X-1" (1977–78)	"La Villa Strangiato" (1978)

"Cygnus X-1" is a two-part song series by Canadian progressive rock band Rush. The first part, "Book I: The Voyage", is the last song on the 1977 album A Farewell to Kings, and the second part, "Book II: Hemispheres", is the first song on the following album, 1978's Hemispheres. Book I is ten minutes and twenty-five seconds long (10:25), and Book II is eighteen minutes and seven seconds (18:07).

It was released as a limited-edition extended play on April 22, 2017 for Record Store Day.

== General storyline ==
A black hole, known as Cygnus X-1 (a real-life X-ray source believed to be an actual black hole), lies in the constellation Cygnus. An explorer aboard the spaceship Rocinante journeys toward the black hole, believing there may be something beyond it. As he moves closer, it becomes increasingly difficult to control the ship and he is eventually drawn in by the pull of gravity. The final words of Book I describe his ordeal: "Sound and fury drown my heart/Every nerve is torn apart."

The explorer re-enters the story midway through Book II, left a wandering soul due to the destruction of his body. He has emerged into Olympus, where he witnesses the gods Apollo and Dionysus caught in the struggle between Mind and Heart. Prior to his arrival, the two Gods attempted to sway the people with their own, seemingly disparate, philosophies.

Apollo's insists that logic and founding a great society is the guiding force behind how people are meant to live, convincing them to construct cities and engage in philosophical questions. However, the people suddenly find themselves discontented with this lifestyle and stop participating altogether. A selected group of wise men to cross the Bridge Of Death to speak to Dionysus, in the hopes of finding out some alternate meaning to life.

Dionysus, in contrast to Apollo, believes that emotion and indulgence is the guiding force behind how people are meant to live. He goes as far as to chastise their previous ways of life, referring to reason as a "prison". Swayed by this new reason for existence, they leave the cities and live in the forest, where they spend their days dancing, drinking and loving one another. Unfortunately, due to their lack of foresight in preparing for the winter, the people are left in a state of starvation and are forced to fend off the wolves.

Unsure as to which of the gods is correct, a conflict breaks between these two philosophies. This ultimately leads to the world splintering into two hemispheres, each side continuing in engaging with their deeply unhealthy society.

When the explorer reflects on what he sees, he becomes tormented in the lack of balance of the people who insist on one extreme or the other and the violence that has ensued. His silent scream is felt by the warriors and causes them to rethink their struggle and unite. Wanting someone to keep them in check to avoid a repeat of their conflict, the gods recognize the explorer as a nascent new god and name him Cygnus, the God of Balance. The final words of Book II describe a harmonious society where emotion - "the truth of love" - and logic - "the love of truth" - coexist and feed each other "in a single perfect sphere."

== Allusions and allegory ==
Although the storyline revolves around a science fiction world, it uses Greek mythology to explain the double meaning. "Cygnus X-1" is primarily about the discovery of two conflicting ways of life, and two vastly different ways in which the human mind thinks (logic and emotion are separated into separate sides, or hemispheres, of the brain). The balance point (Cygnus) allows the mind to think with some logic and emotion at the same time, allowing people to be analytical, but not unemotional.

The name of the spaceship Rocinante is derived from the name of the title character's horse in the novel Don Quixote by Miguel de Cervantes.

== Sections ==
=== Book I: The Voyage ===
1. "Prologue": This starts with a dissonant electronic soundscape and spoken introduction by album producer Terry Brown. Afterwards, a heavily syncopated bass riff in shifting time signatures (3/4, 7/8, 3/4, 4/4) fades in, with the full band joining in as the introductory sound effects fade out.
2. "1": The shortest section of the song describes the black hole itself, and asks the question of what happens to someone who flies into it.
3. "2": The protagonist sails into the black hole on board his "Rocinante". This section contains a wah-wah guitar solo by Alex Lifeson.
4. "3": The climactic section of Book I uses a chord sequence first heard at 3:21 in the Prologue. The lyrics describe the "Rocinante" spinning out of control, and the protagonist's body being destroyed ("every nerve is torn apart"). This section includes the highest note sung by Geddy Lee on any studio album (B♭5 at 9:27). The song fades out with a repeated chord sequence – which returns at 11:56 in Book II.

=== Book II: Hemispheres ===
1. "Prelude": This section contains several themes heard later in the song, similar to the "Overture" in "2112".
2. "Apollo Bringer of Wisdom": Apollo, the Greek god of the sun and the arts, represents the left hemisphere. 'Left-brainers' are often logical thinkers, adept at mathematics.
3. "Dionysus Bringer of Love": Dionysus, the Greek god of wine and fertility, represents the right hemisphere. He stood for uninhibited desire in Nietzsche's Birth of Tragedy and Human, All Too Human and was the opposite of Apollo. 'Right-brainers' are less common than 'left-brainers,' and include people who are artistic and sensitive.
4. "Armageddon The Battle of Heart and Mind": The title is reference to the Biblical war, but in this case Apollo and Dionysus pull man in opposite directions, toward Order or Chaos, respectively. The debate between classical and romantic (Apollonian and Dionysian) cultures is ongoing. The left stereo channel switches to the right for dramatic effect when Lee sings the word 'hemispheres'.
5. "Cygnus Bringer of Balance": The chords played at the end of The Voyage return here. The explorer from The Voyage is frightened by the fighting and, after hearing the explorer's silent cry of terror, Apollo and Dionysus stop fighting and dub him Cygnus, god of Balance.
6. "The Sphere A Kind of Dream": Jane Austen's novel Sense and Sensibility may be alluded to in the last few lines of the song.

== See also ==
- List of songs recorded by Rush
- Cygnus X-1 (astronomical object)
- Apollonian and Dionysian
