= Circumstances (song) =

Single by Rush

from the album Hemispheres
- B-side: "The Trees"
- Released: January 1979 (Can.)
- Genre: Progressive rock
- Length: 3:44
- Label: Anthem
- Songwriters: Neil Peart, Geddy Lee, Alex Lifeson
- Producers: Rush & Terry Brown

Rush singles chronology
"The Trees" (1978)	"Circumstances" (1979)	"The Spirit of Radio" (1980)

Music video
- "Circumstances" on YouTube

"Circumstances" is a song by Canadian rock band Rush from its 1978 album Hemispheres. Lyrically, it is an autobiographical account by drummer Neil Peart about the time he spent living in England, and his eventual disillusionment with his then-current occupations.

The song was played sporadically on the 1978-79 Tour of the Hemispheres, and did not return to Rush's setlists until the 2007 Snakes & Arrows Tour. On the latter tour, the song was played in a lower key than the original recording, to accommodate vocalist Geddy Lee's vocal range decreasing with age.

It is one of a few Rush songs with French lyrics, these occurring in the chorus: "Plus ça change, plus c'est la même chose" (the more it changes, the more it is the same).

== See also ==
- List of Rush songs
