= A Farewell to Kings =

Studio album by Rush
- Released: August 29, 1977
- Recorded: June–July 1977
- Studio: Rockfield (Rockfield, Wales, United Kingdom)
- Genre: Progressive rock
- Length: 37:13
- Label: Anthem
- Producers: Rush; Terry Brown

Rush chronology
All the World's a Stage (1976)	A Farewell to Kings (1977)	Hemispheres (1978)

Singles from A Farewell to Kings
- 1. "Closer to the Heart" Released: October 1977; 2. "Cinderella Man" Released: January 1978

Alternative cover
- 40th anniversary reissue

A Farewell to Kings (Note: Stylized in all lower case.) is the fifth studio album by Canadian rock band Rush, released on Anthem Records on August 29, 1977. The album reached No. 11 in Canada and marked a growth in the band's international fanbase. It became the band's second Top 40 album in the United States, after their 1976 double live album All the World's a Stage, and was their first Top 40 album in the United Kingdom.

After reaching a critical and commercial peak with 2112 and touring the album, Rush decided to record the follow-up outside Toronto for the first time and settled in Rockfield Studios in Wales after their debut European tour. A Farewell to Kings is noted for the band expanding their sound with greater use of synthesizers and each member playing more instruments than before, and having long and short tracks such as the 11-minute "Xanadu" and the under-3-minute "Closer to the Heart", both of which became live favourites. The closing science-fiction-themed "Cygnus X-1 Book I: The Voyage" ends on a cliffhanger which concludes on the next album, Hemispheres.

A Farewell to Kings received a generally positive reception from critics. "Closer to the Heart" was released as the album's first single, which reached No. 36 in the UK. Rush supported the album with their most extensive tour at the time, headlining major venues across North America and Europe for over 140 dates. A 40th-anniversary remastered edition with bonus tracks and a 5.1 surround sound mix was released in 2017.

== Background and recording ==
In June 1977, Rush ended their tour supporting their breakthrough album 2112 and subsequent live release, All the World's a Stage. The tour culminated in the band's first European dates with shows in England, which attracted widespread praise from fans and critics. It was around this time when Rush decided against their usual post-tour break to continue momentum and produce a follow-up album, but wanted to record somewhere other than Toronto, Canada. Following what drummer and lyricist Neil Peart described as an "extremely difficult" search for a studio that suited the band, their longtime producer and engineer Terry Brown discovered Rockfield Studios in Monmouthshire, Wales. His enthusiasm at the idea of recording at the facility convinced the band to work there. Rush were keen to work in England as they were fans of British pop music, and the seclusion eliminated the distractions they usually faced at home. Peart felt the seclusion and mellow atmosphere at the studio created a productive environment, with the album put down in three weeks. Apart from early ideas for "Closer to the Heart", the songs were put together at Rockfield.

A Farewell to Kings marked a development in the group's sound, with greater use of synthesizers and each member playing additional instruments. Peart said it was the result of the decision to put out All the World's a Stage, which caused an extended creative hiatus that gave the band time "to think about ourselves as musicians". In addition, Rush declared the release of the latter as "the close of chapter one" of their history, further suggesting a shift in the group's approach. The trio had looked back on 2112 and felt their sound was too confined, so they decided to feature new and different instruments that they were comfortable enough with on their new material without bringing in a fourth member, which Peart said would have been "the easy way out." Peart added orchestra and tubular bells, chimes, and other percussion to his drum kit; bassist and vocalist Geddy Lee added a Rickenbacker 4080 double neck bass and Minimoog; and guitarist Alex Lifeson plays new guitar models and a Moog Taurus bass pedal synthesizer, which Lee also used. Once recording finished, the album was mixed at Advision Studios in London. Lee was particularly excited at visiting that studio, for it was where Yes and Emerson, Lake and Palmer had recorded hit albums.

In 2017, Lee considered the album as a particularly important one in regard to his musical development. "I learned a lot; I was learning a lot. I was always challenged and I was very stimulated and the result was A Farewell to Kings, so I guess it was a pivotal record in that regard."

== Songs ==
=== Side one ===
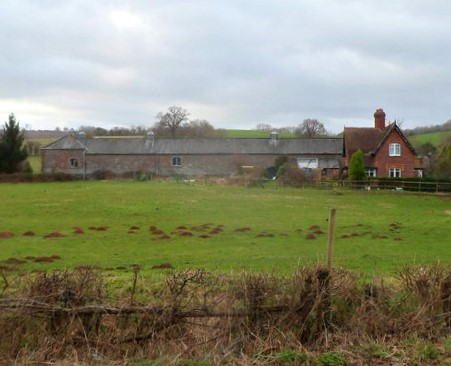
Rockfield Studios

The album's title track features an acoustic guitar introduction from Lifeson that was recorded outside the studio building as he walked around a stereo microphone, with Lee outside with him playing a Minimoog. Its title originated from an idea Peart had about a year prior to working on the album, until Lee and longtime Rush manager Ray Danniels pushed him to work the phrase into a complete lyric, and was subsequently used as the album's title. Although Lee considered the track difficult to reproduce on stage it became a group favourite, as Peart wrote in the album's tour book: "It seems to encapsulate everything that we want Rush to represent."

The 11-minute "Xanadu" opens with a five-minute instrumental section that includes birds chirping that was also recorded outside the studio. It is a fantasy-inspired song that Peart described at the time as "the most complex and multi-textured piece we have ever attempted". The opening line is taken from Kubla Khan by English poet Samuel Taylor Coleridge. Initially Peart had an idea based on the 1941 drama film Citizen Kane before he found Coleridge's poem, the lines of which "etched like a burning image in my head", although Lee had the film's opening montage in mind when creating the soundscape in its introduction. Rush had performed the song during their debut UK tour. After playing an initial run-through of the track to gauge the balance and tone of the microphones in the recording room, the group performed it a second time once the equipment was set up, which was used on the album. On some later tours Lifeson and Lee played a double neck guitar and bass, respectively, when performing the song live in order to play the 6-string and 12-string parts, which became an iconic look for the band. The pair brought back the double necked guitars for their R40 Live Tour.

=== Side two ===
"Closer to the Heart" was the first song that the band worked on for the album; it was also an early title for the album's name. Lifeson picked the song as an example of Lee devising melodic bass lines on an acoustic guitar, such as the song's opening riff, which caught his attention and asked Lee to teach it to him. It was the first Rush song in which Peart collaborated with someone on the lyrics; the title and first verse was written by Peter Talbot, a friend of the group who, in addition to being a writer, worked in the media. In regard to its meaning, Peart noted that as "A Farewell to Kings" deals with the idea of problems, "Closer to the Heart" addresses the solutions.

"Cinderella Man" is based on one of Lee's favourite films, the 1936 romantic comedy drama Mr. Deeds Goes to Town, and the themes that it portrays. A self-described film buff, he had secret inspirations of being a film director and realised most of them "have to be part megalomaniac, I think I sort of went off that idea." After writing the lyrics, with some assistance from Lifeson, Lee handed them to Peart who subsequently helped him "clean it up a bit."

"Madrigal" is a romantic ballad. The drums were recorded in an echo room.

The album closes with "Cygnus X-1 Book I: The Voyage", a science-fiction song that tells the story of an unnamed explorer who travels to the centre of Cygnus X-1, a real black hole, in a spaceship named the Rocinante, believing there may be something beyond it. Upon approaching the centre the protagonist loses control of the ship and is drawn into it by the pull of gravity, its body destroyed. Peart was inspired by an article he had read in Time magazine about black holes and their origins, after which he researched on the topic further and wrote the lyrics. The Rocinante is named after the horse in the novel Don Quixote. Lee thought the science-fiction genre presented limitless musical ideas which inspired the band to "use all your goofy, weird sounds because that's what's happening out in space." The words "To be continued" are written on the album liner notes, revealing the group's decision to conclude the story on their next record, which became the 18-minute opener "Cygnus X-1 Book II: Hemispheres" on 1978's Hemispheres.

== Artwork ==
The cover artwork was produced by longtime Rush art director and graphic artist Hugh Syme, who started on the design before the band had left to tour England. He based it on an idea the group had described to him which covers the themes addressed on the title track. The front cover features a composite photograph of puppet-like king slumped on a throne in front of a demolished building, contrasted with the Toronto skyline in the background that depicts the city's Harbour Castle Hotel. Syme was inspired to make a composite design from looking at covers produced by Hipgnosis, of which he was a particularly big fan. A resident of the Niagara region, Syme had spotted a "beautiful, dilapidated" building in ruins in nearby Buffalo, New York, and visited it with guitarist Josh Anderson, his bandmate in the Ian Thomas Band. The setting was used for the cover and Syme had Anderson pose as the puppet as his thin figure was ideal for the character. In post-production Syme altered the mouth, jaw, and eyes, and added the sky, smokestack and strings, plus a prosthetic to make the character appear more mechanical.

== Release ==
A Farewell to Kings was released on August 29, 1977 on Anthem Records, an independent label formed in May 1977 by Danniels and business partner Vic Wilson in order for Rush to have greater creative control over their product. The name was derived from the same-titled Ayn Rand novel and the track on the band's second album, Fly by Night. The albums were distributed across North America through Polydor Records. In the UK, Anthem distributor Phonogram prepared an extensive advertising campaign for the album to increase the band's profile there.

In November 1977, A Farewell to Kings was one of three Rush albums to be certified gold by the Recording Industry Association of America for selling 500,000 copies. The others were 2112 and All the World's a Stage, and were the band's first albums to reach the certification. A Farewell to Kings also reached gold in the UK, signifying 100,000 copies sold.

== Reception and legacy ==
Contemporaneous reviews
Review scores
Source	Rating
Christgau's Record Guide	D
Record Mirror	2/5 stars

Retrospective reviews
Review scores
Source	Rating
AllMusic	4/5 stars
Classic Rock	(2017)
Collector's Guide to Heavy Metal	6/9
The Encyclopedia of Popular Music	3/5 stars
The Essential Rock Discography	7/10
MusicHound Rock	3/5 stars
PopMatters	8/10 (2017)
The Rolling Stone Album Guide	2.5/5 stars
The Virgin Encyclopedia of 80s Music	3/5 stars

On release, Billboard wrote that "this trio has abated its heavy metal thunder somewhat for a lavishly orchestrated extravaganza that has a rock opera feel to it".

AllMusic's Greg Prato said that Rush "had improved their songwriting and strengthened their focus and musical approach". He took notice of the synthesizers that were creeping into the arrangements, "a direction the band would continue to pursue on future releases". He said "Xanadu" "remains an outstanding accomplishment all these years later".

Conversely, Village Voice critic Robert Christgau gave the record a D grade, panning Rush as "the most obnoxious band currently making a killing on the zonked teen circuit"; he further compared them to bands such as Angel, Kansas, and Uriah Heep, "with vocals revved up an octave. Or two."

In the Q & Mojo 2005 Classic Special Edition Pink Floyd & The Story of Prog Rock, the album came in sixth in a list of "40 Cosmic Rock Albums".

In 2021, American funk metal band Primus embarked on their "A Tribute to Kings" Tour. At each show, Primus played their original material in the first set before covering the entire "A Farewell to Kings" album in their second set.

== Tour ==
A Farewell to Kings was supported with a tour of Canada, the US, and Europe between August 1977 and May 1978. The 140-date tour was particularly taxing on the group, who dubbed it the Drive 'til You Die Tour. It was their most extensive tour since their formation, and marked the group headlining major venues for the first time and a growth in their international fanbase. Early into the tour, Rush performed a sold-out show at Toronto's Exhibition Stadium that was attended by over 22,000 people. Tickets for a 16-date leg across the UK in February 1978, double the size of their first visit one year prior, quickly sold out. Excerpts from the 20 February 1978 concert was included in the Different Stages compilation, and released in full on the 40th anniversary box set of A Farewell to Kings.

== Reissues ==
Reissues
Year	Label	Format	Notes
1986	Mercury	CD, cassette	Catalogue number: 822-546-2 M-1
1997	Anthem/Mercury	CD	Catalogue number: ANMD1079. As part of "The Rush Remasters" series.
2015	Anthem/Mercury	LP, Blu-ray	Catalogue number: B0022376-01. Digitally remastered, 200 g audiophile vinyl. Also available in 24-bit/96 kHz and 24-bit/192 kHz digital formats.
2017	Anthem/Mercury	CD	Catalogue number: B0027245-02. 40th anniversary edition.

== Track listing ==
=== Original release ===
All lyrics are written by Neil Peart, except where noted; all music is composed by Geddy Lee and Alex Lifeson, except where noted.

Side one
No.	Title	Music	Length
1.	"A Farewell to Kings"	Lee, Lifeson, Peart	5:51
2.	"Xanadu"		11:05

Side two
No.	Title	Lyrics	Music	Length
1.	"Closer to the Heart"	Peart, Peter Talbot		2:54
2.	"Cinderella Man"	Lee		4:20
3.	"Madrigal"			2:35
4.	"Cygnus X-1 Book I: The Voyage" "Prologue" (5:01) "1" (0:44) "2" (1:30) "3" (3:03)		Lee, Lifeson, Peart	10:25

=== 40th anniversary edition (2017) ===
40th Anniversary edition disc two (Live at Hammersmith Odeon, February 20, 1978)
No.	Title	Music	Length
1.	"Bastille Day"		6:03
2.	"Lakeside Park"		4:30
3.	"By-Tor & The Snow Dog"		5:07
4.	"Xanadu"		12:21
5.	"A Farewell to Kings"		6:19
6.	"Something For Nothing"		4:11
7.	"Cygnus X-1 Book I: The Voyage"	Lee, Lifeson, Peart	10:25

40th Anniversary edition disc three: Live at Hammersmith Odeon, February 20, 1978 [cont'd], covers, and outtakes
No.	Title	Lyrics	Music	Length
1.	"Anthem"			4:54
2.	"Closer to the Heart"	Peart, Peter Talbot		3:26
3.	"2112": I. "Overture" (4:32); II. "The Temples of Syrinx" (2:16); III. "Discovery" (3:06); IV. "Presentation" (3:49); VI. "Soliloquy" (2:27); VII. "Grand Finale" (3:20)			19:30
4.	"Working Man"	Lee	Lee, Lifeson	4:08
5.	"Fly by Night"			2:04
6.	"In the Mood"	Lee	Lee	2:36
7.	"Drum Solo"		Peart	6:43
8.	"Cinderella Man"	Lee	Lee, Lifeson, Peart	4:48
9.	"Xanadu" (Dream Theater)			11:12
10.	"Closer to the Heart" (Big Wreck)			3:25
11.	"Cinderella Man" (The Trews)			4:28
12.	"Madrigal" (Alain Johannes)			3:26
13.	"Cygnus X-2 Eh" (Studio Outtake from the A Farewell to Kings Recording Session)			4:09

== Personnel ==
Rush

- Geddy Lee – vocals, bass, twelve-string guitar, Minimoog, bass pedal synthesizers
- Alex Lifeson – electric and acoustic six- and twelve-string guitars, classical guitar, bass pedal synthesizers
- Neil Peart – drums, orchestra bells, tubular bells, temple blocks, cowbell, wind chimes, bell tree, triangle, vibraslap

Additional personnel

- Terry Brown – spoken vocals on "Cygnus X-1 Book I: The Voyage"

Production

- Rush – production, arrangements
- Terry Brown – production, arrangements, recording engineer, mixing
- Pat Moran – recording engineer
- Declan O'Doherty – mixing assistant
- Ken Thomas – mixing assistant
- George Graves at JAMF – original mastering
- Yosh Inouye – cover photography
- Roger Stowell – sleeve photograph
- Fin Costello – liner notes photograph
- Hugh Syme – cover artwork and graphic direction
- Ray Danniels and Vic Wilson, SRO Productions – management
- Moon Records – executive production

== Charts ==
Chart (1977–1978)	Peak position
Canada Top Albums/CDs (RPM)	11
Dutch Albums (Album Top 100)	150
Swedish Albums (Sverigetopplistan)	41
UK Albums (Official Charts)	22
US Billboard 200	33
Chart (2017-2018)	Peak position
UK Progressive Albums (Official Charts)	6
US Top Hard Rock Albums (Billboard)	6
US Top Rock Albums (Billboard)	30
Chart (2020)	Peak position
Scottish Albums (Official Charts)	74
UK Rock & Metal Albums (Official Charts)	7

== Certifications ==
Region	Certification	Certified units/sales
Canada (Music Canada)	Platinum	100,000^{^}
United Kingdom (BPI)	Gold	100,000^{^}
United States (RIAA)	Platinum	1,000,000^{^}
^{^} Shipments figures based on certification alone.

== Notes and references ==
Notes

Sources

- Popoff, Martin (2004). Contents Under Pressure: 30 Years of Rush at Home and Away. ECW Press. ISBN 978-1-55022-678-2.
- Popoff, Martin (2020). Anthem, Rush in the 70s (1st ed.). Wymer Publishing. ISBN 978-1-77041-520-1.
