= The Trees (Rush song) =

Single by Rush

from the album Hemispheres
- B-side: "Prelude" (promo single) "Circumstances"
- Released: January 1979 (US)
- Genre: Progressive rock; hard rock
- Length: 4:42
- Label: Anthem
- Songwriters: Neil Peart; Geddy Lee; Alex Lifeson
- Producers: Rush; Terry Brown

Rush singles chronology
"Cinderella Man" (1977)	"The Trees" (1979)	"Circumstances" (1978)

Music video
- "The Trees" on YouTube

"The Trees" is a song by Canadian rock band Rush, from its 1978 album Hemispheres. The song is also featured on many of Rush's compilation albums. On the live album Exit...Stage Left, the song features an extended acoustic guitar introduction titled "Broon's Bane."

Rolling Stone readers voted the song number 8 on the list of the 10 best Rush songs.

Live365 ranked it the tenth best Rush song.

Classic Rock readers voted "The Trees" the band's 11th best song.

== Lyrics ==
The lyrics relate a short story about a conflict between maple and oak trees in a forest. The maple trees want more sunlight, but the oak trees are too tall. In the end, "the trees are all kept equal by hatchet, axe, and saw." Conrad Bibens of the St. Joseph News-Press interpreted the song as a metaphor for the Quebec sovereignty movement, where the maples are the proponents and the oaks are English-speaking Canadians.

Rush drummer and lyricist Neil Peart was asked in the April/May 1980 issue of the magazine Modern Drummer if there was a message in the lyrics, to which he replied, "No. It was just a flash. I was working on an entirely different thing when I saw a cartoon picture of these trees carrying on like fools. I thought, 'What if trees acted like people?' So I saw it as a cartoon really, and wrote it that way. I think that's the image that it conjures up to a listener or a reader. A very simple statement." However, in his 2007 book Roadshow: Landscape With Drums. A Concert Tour by Motorcycle, Peart clarified that the song was "a parable about collectivism".

In November 2023, Geddy Lee pondered that the song was "a comment on forced equality"; he also stated that he "may have also been a little naive in [his] original intent. [...] There were a few things we sang about in our early twenties that seemed very important. But as time has gone on, you ameliorate those views because life has told you it's not so simple. [...] You learn a lot about how much of life has lived in the gray areas as opposed to the black and white areas".

== Reception ==
Peter Goddard called "The Trees" an "amazing lyric" that kept with the group's general philosophy while still being different from every past song the group recorded.

== See also ==
- List of songs recorded by Rush
