= In the Mood (Rush song) =

Single by Rush

from the album Rush
- B-side: "What You're Doing"
- Released: December 1974 (US)
- Recorded: 1973
- Genre: Hard rock; blues rock
- Length: 3:37
- Label: Moon; Anthem/Mercury
- Songwriter: Geddy Lee
- Producer: Rush

Rush singles chronology
"Finding My Way" (1974)	"In the Mood" (1974)	"Fly by Night" (1975)

"In the Mood" is a song by the Canadian rock band Rush from their 1974 self-titled debut album. It was at least two years old when recorded for the album.

== Composition ==
"In the Mood" is three minutes and 34 seconds long. The song was composed in the key of A major and is in 4/4 time. It is the only song on the album written entirely by Geddy Lee (the music on all other songs is co-written by guitarist Alex Lifeson).

Lee said that this was the first song he wrote with Lifeson that they "kind of liked".

Lifeson said It "was probably at least two years old, if not three, when we recorded the first album". He also said: "Ged came in and said, 'I've got a good idea for a song' and played it from beginning to end".

The St. Louis classic rock radio station KSHE used to play the song every Friday night at 7:45 p.m. because of the song lyrics mentioning "a quarter to eight".

== Reception ==
"In the Mood" was released as a single, reaching No. 31 in Canada Cash Box said that "the Led Zep sound alikes are in strong form with a more innovative ditty than their last disk" and praised the vocals and backing instrumentation.

Record World said that a live medley with "Fly by Night" "puts the emphasis on fuzz toned guitar and histrionic vocals."

Ultimate Classic Rock thought that it was the worst Rush song released and Greg Prato of AllMusic referred to the song as "predictable".

== Covers ==
The song was covered by Canadian band Sloan for the 2002 movie FUBAR.

== Personnel ==
- Geddy Lee – bass, lead vocals
- Alex Lifeson – guitar
- John Rutsey – drums

== Charts ==
Charted version is a medley of "Fly by Night" and "In the Mood" from 1976's live album, All the World's a Stage.

Chart	Peak position
US Billboard Hot 100	88

== See also ==
- List of Rush songs
