= Iron Maiden: Flight 666 =

2009 concert documentary film

- Directed by: Scot McFadyen; Sam Dunn
- Written by: Scot McFadyen; Sam Dunn
- Produced by: Scot McFadyen; Sam Dunn
- Starring: Iron Maiden
- Narrated by: Sam Dunn
- Cinematography: Martin Hawkes
- Edited by: Lisa Grootenboer; Wendy Hallam Martin; Mike Munn
- Music by: Iron Maiden
- Production companies: Banger Films; Phantom Music Management; EMI
- Distributed by: Arts Alliance Media; EMI; D&E Entertainment (US)
- Release date: 21 April 2009
- Running time: 113 minutes
- Countries: United Kingdom; Canada
- Language: English
- Box office: $233,193

Iron Maiden: Flight 666 is a concert documentary film featuring the English heavy metal band Iron Maiden. The film follows the band on the first leg of their Somewhere Back in Time World Tour in February and March 2008, during which they travelled on their own customised Boeing 757, Ed Force One, which used the call-sign "666".

Flight 666 is co-produced by Toronto-based Banger Films, known for their documentaries Metal: A Headbanger's Journey, Global Metal and Rush: Beyond the Lighted Stage. The film was shot in high-definition video with accompanying 5.1 surround sound produced by Kevin Shirley (who has worked with the band since their 2000 album Brave New World). It was distributed by Arts Alliance Media and EMI (except in the US, where it was sub-distributed by D&E Entertainment) in select digital theatres on 21 April 2009.

== Synopsis and background ==
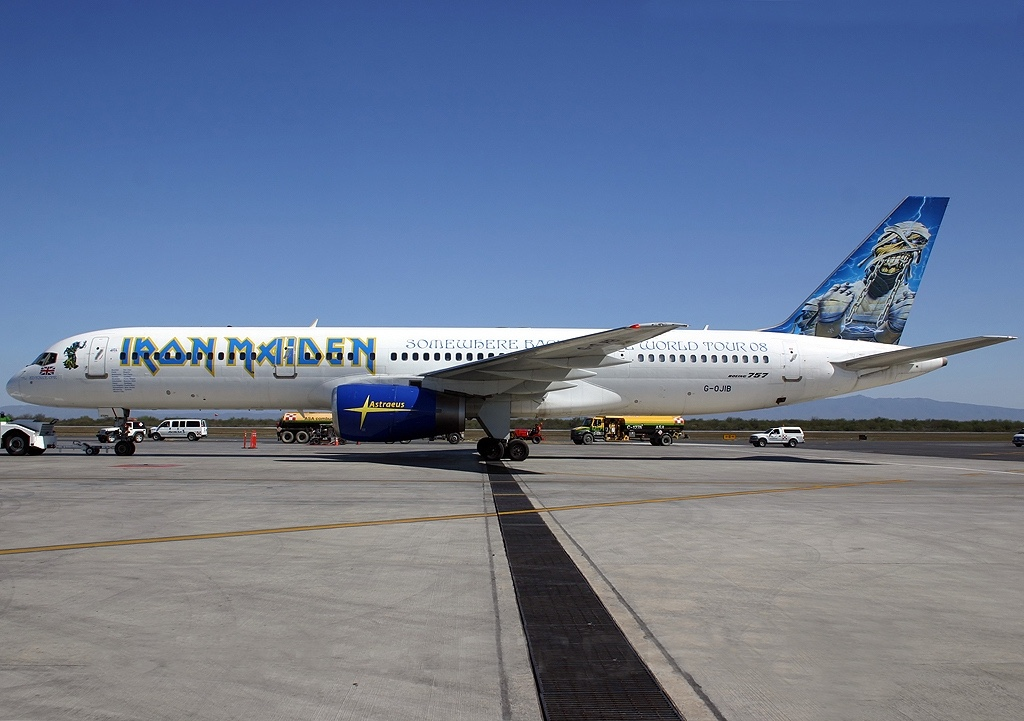
Ed Force One, Iron Maiden's personalised Boeing 757, was used as transport for their tour and features prominently in the film

Iron Maiden: Flight 666 documents the opening leg of the band's Somewhere Back in Time World Tour, which took place between February and March 2008. During this leg of the tour, the group travelled 50,000 miles (encompassing India, Australia and North and South America) in just 45 days, performing 23 shows in 13 countries to half a million fans. To achieve this, the band travelled in their own Boeing 757, nicknamed "Ed Force One" after the band's mascot, Eddie, and in the style of the U.S. president's Air Force One, which was specially converted to carry the band, their crew and twelve tonnes of equipment.

The aeroplane was largely piloted by the band's lead singer, Bruce Dickinson, who was then employed by Astraeus Airlines. According to Dickinson, who came up with the idea, Ed Force One meant they could visit countries where "The bean counters said it's just not worth going" and allowed them to "do an almost European-type itinerary, but on an inter-continental basis". As a result, the band were able to perform in Costa Rica and Colombia for the first time. The aircraft was flown under the call-sign "666", a reference to their 1982 single "The Number of the Beast", which provided the film's title.

Despite the technical aspects behind the tour, the documentary is predominantly about the group's fans, with Dickinson commenting that "Two-thirds of the film is not about us". Scenes shot in South America are particularly focused on the audiences, where Reuters report that they are "venerated like football stars", while The Daily Telegraph state that the film makers "elicit tearful eulogies" from those in Costa Rica and Colombia, then seeing the band for the first time. Dickinson asserts that the band's relationship with their fans is "the real story of Maiden", and the fact that this is the film's primary theme "is the way it should be".

The documentary was written, directed and produced by Scot McFadyen and Sam Dunn, using their production company, Banger Films. McFadyen and Dunn requested permission to shoot the film as soon as the tour was announced, which they received with just two months left to prepare. Despite the fact that the film makers had been acquainted with Iron Maiden while working on their first two documentaries, 2005's Metal: A Headbanger's Journey and 2007's Global Metal, some band members were initially mistrustful of the venture and were wary of having their privacy invaded. Although Dickinson and drummer Nicko McBrain were the most comfortable with the filming, bassist Steve Harris and guitarist Adrian Smith took longer to adapt, while guitarist Janick Gers largely ignored the crew until the final week. Following Iron Maiden: Flight 666, the band worked with Banger Films once again on their 2012 live video, En Vivo!.

== Theatrical showings ==
The film's world première took place at the Cine Odeon in Rio de Janeiro, Brazil on 14 March 2009, during the final leg of the band's Somewhere Back in Time World Tour. The UK première took place on 20 April 2009 at the Kensington Odeon in London. The following night, the film was screened simultaneously on over 450 screens in 41 countries globally. Distributed by Arts Alliance Media and EMI, with D&E Entertainment sub-distributing in the US, Flight 666 was shown in a 2K digital format, with 5.1 surround sound mixed by the band's producer, Kevin Shirley.

The screenings on 21 April were very successful, with Arts Alliance Media reporting that it was the largest simultaneous worldwide release of a documentary film. This led to additional showings in some territories, such as in India, where it was released on 8 May by PVR Pictures, and Australia, where it was screened from 30 April to 6 May. At the UK box office, the film grossed £84,276 (US$123,886), while making $74,134 in Australia and $35,173 in Russia CIS, totalling $233,193 from the three territories tallied.

== Reception ==
Flight 666 was welcomed by overwhelmingly positive reviews from the music press and general media. Rock and metal magazines Kerrang! and Metal Hammer each gave the movie full marks, with Kerrang! referring to it as a "unique peek behind the Iron Curtain" that was "not to be missed" and Metal Hammer calling it a "continent-jumping, fire-breathing monster of a film". Empire gave it 4 stars and felt that the behind the scenes antics were interesting, despite lacking in drama when compared to Metallica: Some Kind of Monster and Anvil! The Story of Anvil, and that the concert footage is "magnificent".

Flight 666 won the "24 Beats Per Second" award for best music documentary at the SXSW Film Festival in Austin, Texas, Music DVD of the Year at 2010's Juno Awards, and Best DVD at the 2009 Metal Storm awards.

== Home media ==
Iron Maiden: Flight 666

Video & live album by Iron Maiden
- Released: 22 May 2009; 9 June 2009 (North America)
- Recorded: 1 February – 16 March 2008
- Venue: Various concerts throughout the first leg of the Somewhere Back in Time World Tour
- Genre: Heavy metal
- Length: 112:20 (film); 101:28 (concert)
- Labels: EMI; UM^{e} (United States)
- Producer: Kevin Shirley (audio)

Iron Maiden video chronology
Live After Death (2008)	Iron Maiden: Flight 666 (2009)	En Vivo! (2012)

Iron Maiden chronology
Somewhere Back in Time (2008)	Flight 666 - The Original Soundtrack (2009)	The Final Frontier (2010)

Iron Maiden: Flight 666 was released on DVD and Blu-ray on 25 May 2009 by EMI. In North America, it was issued on 9 June and by Universal Music Enterprises in the US. In addition to the documentary film, the video contains the full sixteen song setlist from the Somewhere Back in Time World Tour, with each track recorded at a different venue. Alongside the DVD and Blu-ray, a double CD soundtrack album was released simultaneously, featuring the same track listing as the video concert footage. The DVD and Blu-ray release was particularly successful, peaking at No. 1 in 22 countries including the UK and US.

=== Soundtrack and concert footage track listing ===
Professional ratings
Review scores
Source	Rating
AllMusic	3.5/5 stars

Disc One
No.	Title	Writer(s)	Original Album	Length
1.	"Churchill's Speech" (1 February 2008, Mumbai, India)			0:43
2.	"Aces High" (1 February 2008, Mumbai, India)	Steve Harris	1984 ~ Powerslave	4:49
3.	"2 Minutes to Midnight" (7 February 2008, Melbourne, Australia)	Adrian Smith, Bruce Dickinson	1984 ~ Powerslave	5:57
4.	"Revelations" (9 February 2008, Sydney, Australia)	Dickinson	1983 ~ Piece of Mind	6:28
5.	"The Trooper" (16 February 2008, Chiba, Japan)	Harris	1983 ~ Piece of Mind	4:01
6.	"Wasted Years" (22 February 2008, Monterrey, Mexico)	Smith	1986 ~ Somewhere in Time	5:07
7.	"The Number of the Beast" (19 February 2008, Inglewood, United States)	Harris	1982 ~ The Number of the Beast	5:07
8.	"Can I Play With Madness" (24 February 2008, Mexico City, Mexico)	Smith, Dickinson, Harris	1988 ~ Seventh Son of a Seventh Son	3:36
9.	"Rime of the Ancient Mariner" (14 March 2008, East Rutherford, United States)	Harris	1984 ~ Powerslave	13:41

Disc Two
No.	Title	Writer(s)	Original Album	Length
1.	"Powerslave" (26 February 2008, San José, Costa Rica)	Dickinson	1984 ~ Powerslave	7:28
2.	"Heaven Can Wait" (2 March 2008, São Paulo, Brazil)	Harris	1986 ~ Somewhere in Time	7:35
3.	"Run to the Hills" (28 February 2008, Bogotá, Colombia)	Harris	1982 ~ The Number of the Beast	3:59
4.	"Fear of the Dark" (7 March 2008, Buenos Aires, Argentina)	Harris	1992 ~ Fear of the Dark	7:32
5.	"Iron Maiden" (9 March 2008, Santiago, Chile)	Harris	1980 ~ Iron Maiden	5:26
6.	"Moonchild" (12 March 2008, San Juan, Puerto Rico)	Smith, Dickinson	1988 ~ Seventh Son of a Seventh Son	7:29
7.	"The Clairvoyant" (4 March 2008, Curitiba, Brazil)	Harris	1988 ~ Seventh Son of a Seventh Son	4:38
8.	"Hallowed Be Thy Name" (16 March 2008, Toronto, Canada)	Harris	1982 ~ The Number of the Beast	7:52
Total length:				101:28

== Charts ==
=== Album ===
Chart (2009)	Peak position
Australian Albums (ARIA)	66
Austrian Albums (Ö3 Austria)	35
Belgian Albums (Ultratop Flanders)	34
Belgian Albums (Ultratop Wallonia)	51
Dutch Albums (Album Top 100)	50
Finnish Albums (Suomen virallinen lista)	14
French Albums (SNEP)	30
German Albums (Offizielle Top 100)	6
Italian Albums (FIMI)	22
Japanese Albums (Oricon)	106
Norwegian Albums (VG-lista)	22
Scottish Albums (Official Charts)	10
Spanish Albums (Promusicae)	33
Swedish Albums (Sverigetopplistan)	25
Swiss Albums (Schweizer Hitparade)	24
UK Albums (Official Charts)	15
UK Rock & Metal Albums (Official Charts)	3
US Billboard 200	34

==== Video ====
Chart (2009)	Peak position	
Arabia	Arabian Music DVD Charts	1
Australia	ARIA	1
Austria	Ö3 Austria Top 10 DVD	1
Belgium (Flanders)	Ultratop	1
Belgium (Wallonia)	Ultratop	3
Canada	Canadian Music DVD Charts	1
Czech Republic	IFPI ČR	1
Denmark	Tracklisten	1
Finland	The Official Finnish Charts	1
France	SNEP	3
Germany	Media Control Charts	7
Hungary	Mahasz	3
India	Indian Music DVD Charts	1
India	Indian DVD Charts	6
Ireland	IRMA	1
Italy	FIMI	1
Mexico	AMPROFON	1
Netherlands	MegaCharts	3
New Zealand	RIANZ	1
Norway	VG-lista	1
Poland	Polish Music Charts	1
Portugal	AFP	2
Spain	PROMUSICAE	2
Sweden	Sverigetopplistan	1
Switzerland	Swiss Hitparade	1
United Kingdom	UK Blu-ray Chart	7
United Kingdom	UK Music Video Charts	1
United States	Billboard charts	1

== Certifications ==
Album

Region	Certification	Certified units/sales
Canada (Music Canada)	Gold	40,000^{^}
^{^} Shipments figures based on certification alone.

Video

Region	Certification	Certified units/sales
Argentina (CAPIF)	Platinum	8,000^{^}
Australia (ARIA)	Platinum	15,000^{^}
Canada (Music Canada)	5× Platinum	50,000^{^}
Finland (Musiikkituottajat)	Gold	6,046
France (SNEP)	Platinum	15,000^{*}
Germany (BVMI)	Platinum	50,000^{^}
United Kingdom (BPI)	Gold	25,000^{^}
United States (RIAA)	Platinum	100,000^{^}
^{*} Sales figures based on certification alone.^{^} Shipments figures based on certification alone.

== Credits ==
Production and performance credits are adapted from the Blu-ray, DVD and soundtrack album liner notes.

Iron Maiden

- Bruce Dickinson – vocals
- Dave Murray – guitars
- Janick Gers – guitars
- Adrian Smith – guitars, backing vocals
- Steve Harris – bass, backing vocals, co-producer (concert audio)
- Nicko McBrain – drums

Additional musician

- Michael Kenney – keyboards

Film production

- Scot McFadyen – producer, writer, director
- Sam Dunn – producer, writer, director, narrator
- Rod Smallwood – executive producer, band manager
- Stefan Demetriou – executive producer
- Andy Taylor – executive producer, band manager
- Victoria Hirst – co-producer
- Martin Hawkes – director of photography
- Lisa Grooten Boer – editor
- Wendy Hallum Martin – editor
- Mike Munn – editor

Concert audio production

- Kevin Shirley – producer, mixing
- Jared Kvitka – assistant
- Ryan Smith – mastering
- Dave Pattenden – live audio recording
- Ian Walsh – assistant
- Johnny Burke – assistant
- Tony Newton – assistant

Additional personnel

- Peacock – art director, design
- John McMurtrie – photography
- Hangman – stage design
