= Reginald Harkema =

Canadian film editor and director

- Born: 1967 (age 58–59)
- Occupations: film editor and director
- Years active: 1990s-present
- Notable work: Monkey Warfare, Leslie, My Name Is Evil, Super Duper Alice Cooper

Reginald Harkema (born 1967) is a Canadian film editor and director. He is a three-time Genie Award nominee for Best Editing at the 17th Genie Awards in 1996 for Hard Core Logo, at the 19th Genie Awards in 1998 for Last Night and at the 25th Genie Awards in 2004 for Childstar. The 2014 film Super Duper Alice Cooper, which he codirected with Sam Dunn and Scot McFadyen, won a Canadian Screen Award for Best Feature Length Documentary at the 3rd Canadian Screen Awards in 2015.

His other editing credits include the films The Grocer's Wife, Twilight of the Ice Nymphs, Tail Lights Fade, Falling Angels, Kitchen Party, Partition, Fubar 2, Goon and The Stunt Driver, and the television series Metal Evolution.

He has directed the films A Girl Is a Girl, Monkey Warfare, Leslie, My Name Is Evil, Better Off in Bed, and The Kids in the Hall: Comedy Punks.
