= Banger Films =

Canadian film company

- Type: Production company
- Founded: 2004
- Headquarters: Toronto, Ontario, Canada
- Key people: Scot McFadyen (director/producer); Sam Dunn (director/producer/host)
- Owner: Scot McFadyen and Sam Dunn
- Website: bangerfilms.com

Banger Films is a Canadian film and television production company, which specializes in documentary films and television series on music and culture. The company was launched in 2004 by Scot McFadyen and Sam Dunn to create and distribute their first film, Metal: A Headbanger's Journey.

The company has since produced theatrical documentaries and television series, as well as live concert DVDs by rock and heavy metal musicians.

In 2011, Banger Films started a YouTube channel, Bangertv. Most of the channel's content for the first four years of its existence were interviews and trailers of documentaries. Starting in 2015, Bangertv started making album reviews (including tag team/no beef reviews) and hosting weekly live streams. They have since also started a "Best of" series for certain years in the history of Heavy Metal. As of February 2022, Bangertv has 334,000 subscribers.

The company's 2014 film Super Duper Alice Cooper won the Canadian Screen Award for Best Feature Length Documentary at the 3rd Canadian Screen Awards in 2015.

On September 10, 2021, Triumph: Rock & Roll Machine debuted at the 2021 Toronto International Film Festival.

== Filmography ==
Year	Film
2005	Metal: A Headbanger's Journey
2008	Global Metal
2009	Iron Maiden: Flight 666
2009	Joe Bonamassa: Live from the Royal Albert Hall
2010	Rush: Beyond the Lighted Stage
2011	Metal Evolution (series)
2011	Time Machine 2011: Live in Cleveland
2012	En Vivo!
2014	Super Duper Alice Cooper
2015	Rock Icons (TV series)
2015	Satan Lives
2016	Hip-Hop Evolution
2017	Long Time Running
2020	ZZ Top - That Little Ol' Band From Texas
2021	Triumph - Rock & Roll Machine
2021	K-Pop Evolution
2021	This Is Pop
2022	Sex with Sue
2024	Any Other Way: The Jackie Shane Story
2026	Neil Peart: No One's Disciple
