= Somewhere Back in Time World Tour =

2008–2009 concert tour by Iron Maiden

- Tour by Iron Maiden
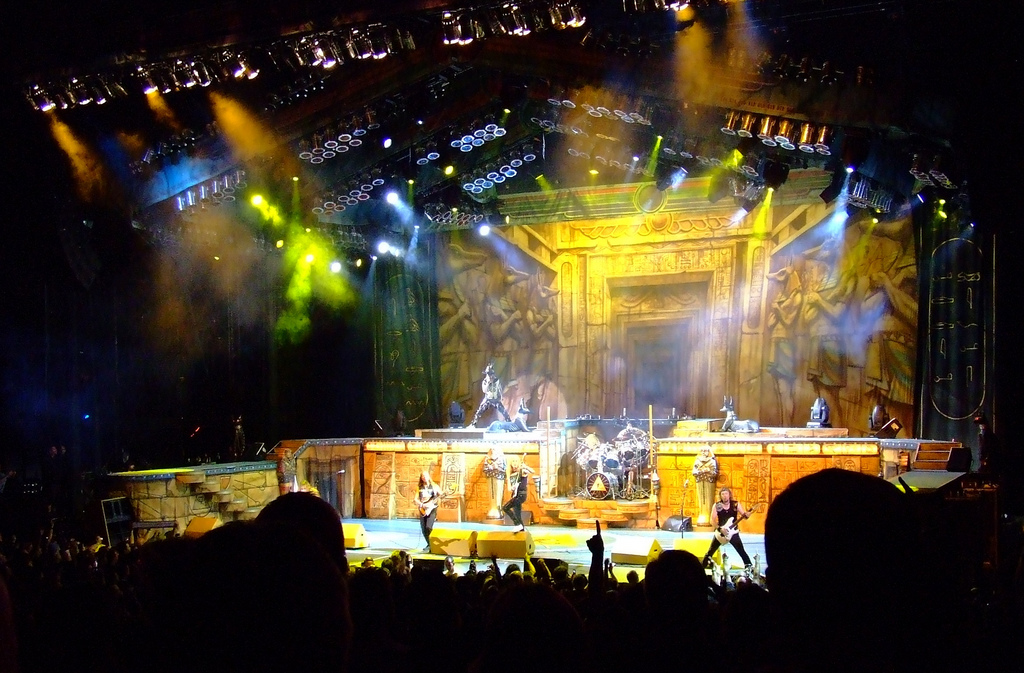
- Iron Maiden performing in Irvine on 31 May 2008
- Location: Americas; Europe; Asia; Oceania
- Associated albums: Powerslave; Somewhere in Time; Seventh Son of a Seventh Son
- Start date: 1 February 2008
- End date: 2 April 2009
- Legs: 4
- No. of shows: 90 in total (91 scheduled)

Iron Maiden concert chronology
- A Matter of Life and Death Tour (2006–2007); Somewhere Back in Time World Tour (2008–2009); The Final Frontier World Tour (2010–2011)

Somewhere Back in Time World Tour was a concert tour by the English heavy metal band Iron Maiden in 2008 and 2009, focused on the band's 1980s material, in particular songs from Powerslave, Somewhere in Time and Seventh Son of a Seventh Son. The tour tied in with the second part of the DVD series, entitled "The History of Iron Maiden", and prompted the release of a new greatest hits compilation, Somewhere Back in Time.

The tour was advertised as a way of bringing back the 1980s stage show and forgotten "classics" for an audience of younger fans, not having been born in time to witness the original. Many of the band's songs had not been played in a long time, as much as 21 years in one case, and two of them ("Moonchild" and "Rime of the Ancient Mariner") never having been played by the current line-up. The stage set was based around that of the widely celebrated World Slavery Tour of 1984–85, featuring similar pyrotechnics and the return of the giant mummified Eddie, but also included a lighting rig and cyborg walk-on Eddie based on that of Somewhere on Tour 1986.

The tour would also see the first use of Ed Force One, Iron Maiden's customised Boeing 757, designed to carry band, crew and equipment across continents, which is piloted by the band's lead singer Bruce Dickinson, who also received the qualifications to fly the Boeing 757. The ground breaking nature of the tour led to the documentary entitled Iron Maiden: Flight 666, released in select cinemas in April 2009, followed by a Blu-ray, DVD and CD release in May and June, which would top the music DVD charts in 25 countries.

The 2008 tour was the second highest grossing of the year for a British artist, with the band reportedly playing to well over than 2 million people worldwide over both years.

== Tour synopsis ==
The first leg of Iron Maiden's Somewhere Back in Time World Tour opened in Mumbai, India on 1 February, and continued through Australia, Japan, Los Angeles and Mexico, followed by concerts in Costa Rica, Colombia, Brazil, Argentina, Chile, Puerto Rico and New Jersey, before finishing in Toronto, on 16 March. Over the 45-day period the band played 23 concerts to over 500,000 fans in 11 countries, flying close to 50,000 miles in the specially refitted plane: Boeing 757, dubbed "Ed Force One" after a competition to name the plane. On this leg of the tour, the Iron Maiden: Flight 666 film was shot.

Concerning concerts in Scandinavia, EMA Telstar announced that the Iron Maiden tour will be the biggest rock tour that any band has ever undertaken in these Nordic regions. Tour promoter Thomas Johansson of EMA Telstar commented:

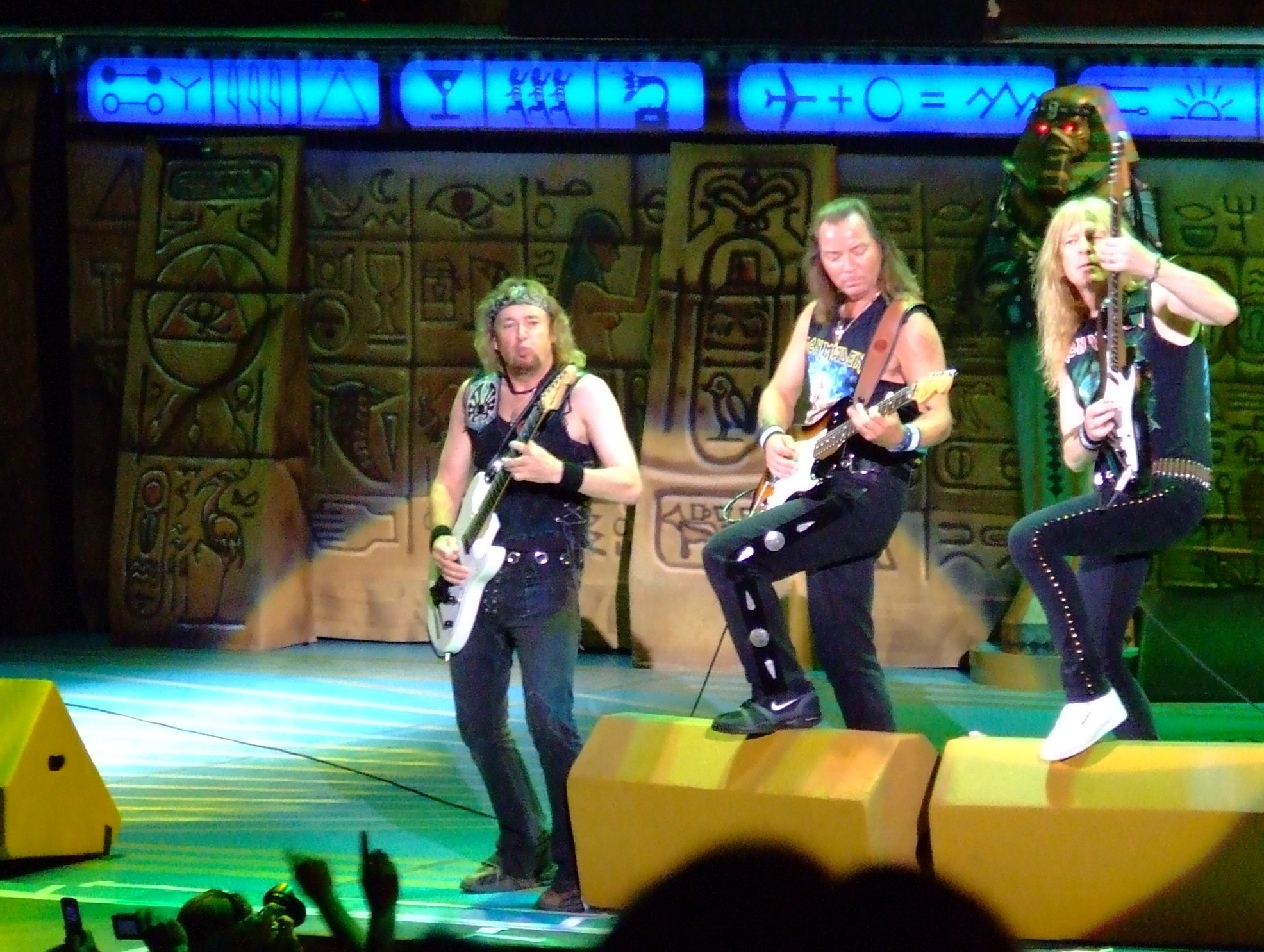
Adrian Smith, Dave Murray and Janick Gers performing in Irvine.

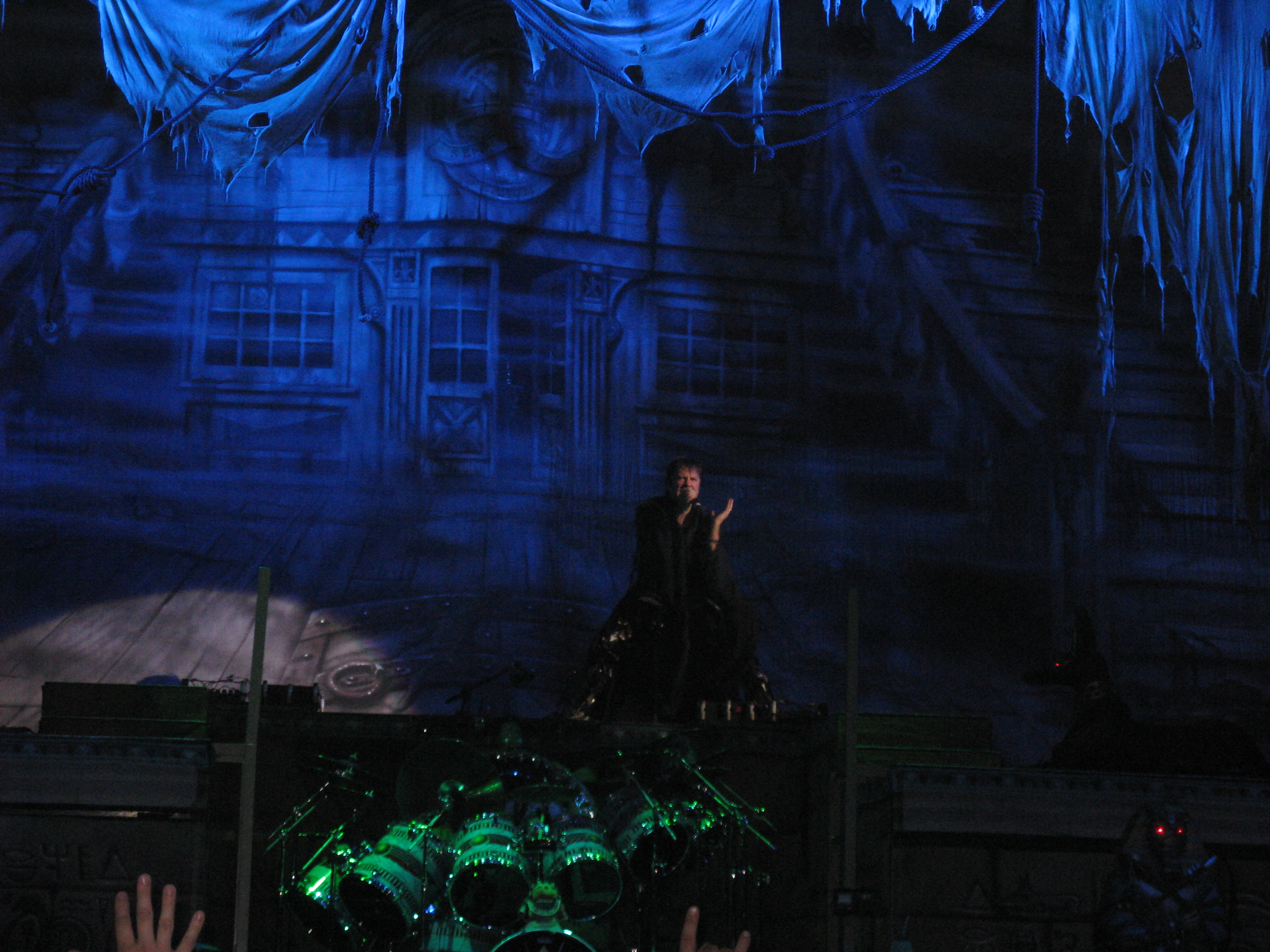
Bruce Dickinson performing "Rime of the Ancient Mariner" in Paris.

"We are all very proud to be making history by giving our rock fans the biggest Nordic Rock Tour there has ever been and certainly one of the most spectacular. Maiden is so hugely popular with the Nordic peoples that we wanted to ensure that as many fans as possible got the opportunity to see this very special show next year as we expect demand for tickets to be enormous.",

== Support acts ==
The opening bands on the tour were:

- First Leg: Lauren Harris, Vanishing Point (Perth and Melbourne), Behind Crimson Eyes (Sydney and Brisbane), Parikrama (Mumbai), Introspeciión (Bogota)
- Second Leg: Lauren Harris Anthrax (30 and 31 May only) and Trivium (Holmdel only).
- Third Leg: Lauren Harris, Within Temptation (London and Assen only), Kamelot (Assen), Avenged Sevenfold (from 1 to 31 July), Trooper (Bucharest), Made of Hate (Warsaw), Salamandra (Prague), Slayer (Lisbon and Mérida), Tainted (Christchurch), Rising Dream (Split)
- Fourth Leg: Lauren Harris, Carcass (Monterrey and Guadalajara), Atreyu (Monterrey and Mexico), Morbid Angel (Monterrey), Anthrax (Bogota), Loathsome Faith (Bogota), Abstract Enemy (Bogota), Ágora (Mexico City), IRA (Monterrey), M.A.S.A.C.R.E. (Lima), Witchblade (Chile)

== Setlist ==
2008 Setlist

Transylvania/Churchill's Speech
Intro song to all shows on this leg of the tour.

1. "Aces High" (from Powerslave, 1984)
2. "2 Minutes to Midnight" (from Powerslave, 1984)
3. "Revelations" (from Piece of Mind, 1983)
4. "The Trooper" (from Piece of Mind, 1983)
5. "Wasted Years" (from Somewhere in Time, 1986)
6. "The Number of the Beast" (from The Number of the Beast, 1982)
7. "Can I Play with Madness" (from Seventh Son of a Seventh Son, 1988)
8. "Rime of the Ancient Mariner" (from Powerslave, 1984)
9. "Powerslave" (from Powerslave, 1984)
10. "Heaven Can Wait" (from Somewhere in Time, 1986)
11. "Run to the Hills" (from The Number of the Beast, 1982)
12. "Fear of the Dark" (from Fear of the Dark, 1992)
13. "Iron Maiden" (from Iron Maiden, 1980)

Encore

14. "Moonchild" (from Seventh Son of a Seventh Son, 1988)
15. "The Clairvoyant" (from Seventh Son of a Seventh Son, 1988)
16. "Hallowed Be Thy Name" (from The Number of the Beast, 1982)
2009 Setlist

Transylvania/Churchill's Speech
Intro song to all shows on this leg of the tour.

1. "Aces High" (from Powerslave, 1984)
2. "Wrathchild" (from Killers, 1981)
3. "2 Minutes to Midnight" (from Powerslave, 1984)
4. "Children of the Damned" (from The Number of the Beast, 1982)
5. "Phantom of the Opera" (from Iron Maiden, 1980)
6. "The Trooper" (from Piece of Mind, 1983)
7. "Wasted Years" (from Somewhere in Time, 1986)
8. "Rime of the Ancient Mariner" (from Powerslave, 1984)
9. "Powerslave" (from Powerslave, 1984)
10. "Run to the Hills" (from The Number of the Beast, 1982)
11. "Fear of the Dark" (from Fear of the Dark, 1992)
12. "Hallowed Be Thy Name" (from The Number of the Beast, 1982)
13. "Iron Maiden" (from Iron Maiden, 1980)

Encore

14. "The Number of The Beast" (from The Number of the Beast, 1982)
15. "The Evil That Men Do" (from Seventh Son of a Seventh Son, 1988)
16. "Sanctuary" (from Iron Maiden, 1980)

Note:

- In Belgrade, the opening date of the 2009 tour, "2 Minutes to Midnight" and "Wrathchild" were played the other way round. In addition, The drum intro to "The Trooper" was mistakenly played before "Phantom of the Opera", and the intro to "Wasted Years" was also played before "The Trooper". Only the first mistake affected the concert's setlist.

== Personnel ==
(Credits taken from the official tour programme.)

Iron Maiden

- Bruce Dickinson – lead vocals
- Dave Murray – guitar
- Adrian Smith – guitar, backing vocals
- Janick Gers – guitar
- Steve Harris – bass, backing vocals
- Nicko McBrain – drums, percussion

Management

- Rod Smallwood
- Andy Taylor

Booking Agents

- John Jackson at K2 Agency Ltd.

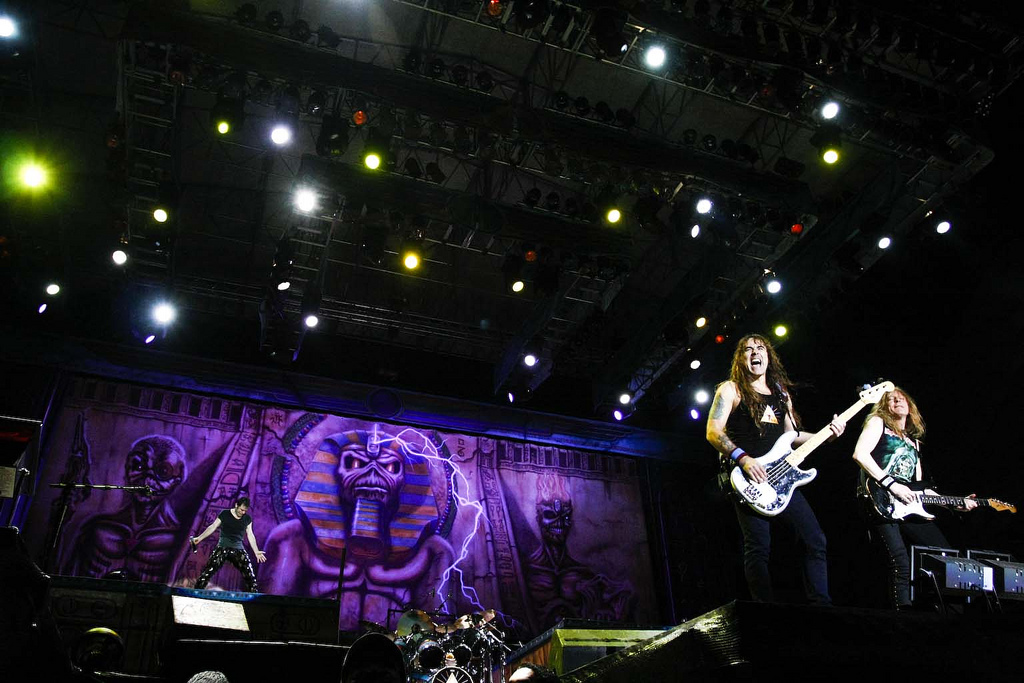
Bruce Dickinson, Steve Harris and Janick Gers in Costa Rica.

Crew

- Ian Day – Tour Manager
- Steve Gadd – Assistant Tour Manager
- Jason Danter – Production Manager
- Bill Conte – Stage Manager
- Zeb Minto – Tour Coordinator
- Natasha De Sampayo – Wardrobe
- Doug Hall – Front of House Sound Engineer
- Steve 'Gonzo' Smith – Monitor Engineer
- Ian 'Squid' Walsh – Sound Technician
- Mike Hackman – Sound Technician
- Rob Coleman – Lighting Designer
- Rowan Norris – Lighting Technician
- Sean Brady – Adrian Smith's Guitar Technician
- Colin Price – Dave Murray's Guitar Technician
- Mick Pryde – Janick Gers' Guitar Technician
- Michael Kenney – Steve Harris' Bass Technician and keyboards
- Charlie Charlesworth – Nicko McBrain's Drum Technician
- Paul Stratford – Set Carpenter
- Ashley Groom – Set Carpenter
- Philip Stewart – Set Carpenter
- Jeff Weir – Tour Security
- Peter Lokrantz – Masseuse
- Dave 'Tith' Pattenden – Video Director
- Johnny 'TGD' Burke – Moving and Still Pictures
- Keith Maxwell – Pyrotechnician
- Eric Muccio – Pyrotechnician
- Boomer – Merchandising
- Dick Bell – Production Consultant

== Tour dates ==
List of 2008 concerts
Date	City	Country	Venue
1 February 2008	Mumbai	India	Bandra-Kurla complex
4 February 2008	Perth	Australia	Burswood Dome
6 February 2008	Melbourne	Australia	Rod Laver Arena
7 February 2008	Melbourne	Australia	Rod Laver Arena
9 February 2008	Sydney	Australia	Acer Arena
10 February 2008	Sydney	Australia	Acer Arena
12 February 2008	Brisbane	Australia	Brisbane Entertainment Centre
15 February 2008	Yokohama	Japan	Yokohama Pacifico
16 February 2008	Chiba	Japan	Makuhari Messe
19 February 2008	Inglewood	United States	The Forum
21 February 2008	Zapopan	Mexico	Auditorio Telmex
22 February 2008	Monterrey	Mexico	Monterrey Arena
24 February 2008	Mexico City	Mexico	Foro Sol
26 February 2008	San José	Costa Rica	Estadio Ricardo Saprissa
28 February 2008	Bogotá	Colombia	Simón Bolívar Park
2 March 2008	São Paulo	Brazil	Estádio Palestra Itália
4 March 2008	Curitiba	Brazil	Pedreira Paulo Leminski
5 March 2008	Porto Alegre	Brazil	Gigantinho
7 March 2008	Buenos Aires	Argentina	Estadio Ricardo Etcheverry
9 March 2008	Santiago	Chile	Pista Atletica
12 March 2008	San Juan	Puerto Rico	Coliseo de Puerto Rico, José Miguel Agrelot
14 March 2008	East Rutherford	United States	Izod Center
16 March 2008	Toronto	Canada	Air Canada Centre
21 May 2008	Selma	United States	Verizon Wireless Amphitheater
22 May 2008	The Woodlands	United States	Cynthia Woods Mitchell Pavilion
25 May 2008	Albuquerque	United States	Journal Pavilion
26 May 2008	Phoenix	United States	Cricket Wireless Pavilion
28 May 2008	Concord	United States	Sleep Train Pavilion
30 May 2008	Irvine	United States	Verizon Wireless Amphitheatre
31 May 2008	Irvine	United States	Verizon Wireless Amphitheatre
2 June 2008	Auburn	United States	White River Amphitheatre
3 June 2008	Vancouver	Canada	Pacific Coliseum
5 June 2008	Calgary	Canada	Saddledome
6 June 2008	Edmonton	Canada	Rexall Place
8 June 2008	Regina	Canada	Brandt Centre
9 June 2008	Winnipeg	Canada	MTS Centre
11 June 2008	Rosemont	United States	Allstate Arena
12 June 2008	Cuyahoga Falls	United States	Blossom Music Center
14 June 2008	Holmdel	United States	PNC Bank Arts Center
15 June 2008	New York City	United States	Madison Square Garden
17 June 2008	Camden	United States	Susquehanna Bank Center
18 June 2008	Columbia	United States	Merriweather Post Pavilion
20 June 2008	Mansfield	United States	Comcast Center
21 June 2008	Montreal	Canada	Parc Jean-Drapeau
27 June 2008	Bologna	Italy	Gods of Metal
29 June 2008	Dessel	Belgium	Graspop Metal Meeting
1 July 2008	Paris	France	Palais Omnisports de Paris-Bercy
2 July 2008	Paris	France	Palais Omnisports de Paris-Bercy
5 July 2008	London	England	Twickenham Stadium
9 July 2008	Lisbon	Portugal	Super Bock Super Rock
11 July 2008	Mérida	Spain	Via de la Plata Festival
~~12 July 2008~~	Zaragoza	Spain	Metalway Festival
16 July 2008	Stockholm	Sweden	Stockholm Olympic Stadium
18 July 2008	Helsinki	Finland	Helsinki Olympic Stadium
19 July 2008	Tampere	Finland	Ratina Stadion
22 July 2008	Trondheim	Norway	Lerkendal Stadion
24 July 2008	Oslo	Norway	Valle Hovin
26 July 2008	Gothenburg	Sweden	Ullevi Stadium
27 July 2008	Horsens	Denmark	Godsbanepladsen
31 July 2008	Wacken	Germany	Wacken Open Air
2 August 2008	Athens	Greece	Terra Vibe Park
4 August 2008	Bucharest	Romania	Cotroceni Stadium
7 August 2008	Warsaw	Poland	Gwardia Stadium
8 August 2008	Prague	Czech Republic	Synot Tip Arena
10 August 2008	Split	Croatia	Stadion Poljud
12 August 2008	Budapest	Hungary	Sziget Festival
14 August 2008	Basel	Switzerland	St. Jakobshalle
16 August 2008	Assen	Netherlands	TT Circuit Assen
19 August 2008	Moscow	Russia	Olimpiyskiy Arena

List of 2009 concerts
Date	City	Country	Venue
10 February 2009	Belgrade	Serbia	Belgrade Arena
13 February 2009	Dubai	United Arab Emirates	Media City Amphitheatre
15 February 2009	Bangalore	India	Palace Grounds
20 February 2009	Auckland	New Zealand	Mount Smart Stadium
22 February 2009	Christchurch	New Zealand	Westpac Arena
25 February 2009	Monterrey	Mexico	Estadio Universitario
26 February 2009	Guadalajara	Mexico	Arena VFG
28 February 2009	Mexico City	Mexico	Foro Sol
3 March 2009	Alajuela	Costa Rica	Estadio Alejandro Morera Soto
5 March 2009	Caracas	Venezuela	Poliedro de Caracas
7 March 2009	Bogota	Colombia	Simon Bolivar Park
10 March 2009	Quito	Ecuador	Estadio Aucas
12 March 2009	Manaus	Brazil	Sambodromo
14 March 2009	Rio de Janeiro	Brazil	Praça da Apoteose
15 March 2009	São Paulo	Brazil	Autodromo de Interlagos
18 March 2009	Belo Horizonte	Brazil	Mineirinho
20 March 2009	Brasília	Brazil	Estádio Mané Garrincha
22 March 2009	Santiago	Chile	Club Hipico Santiago
26 March 2009	Lima	Peru	Estadio Nacional
28 March 2009	Buenos Aires	Argentina	José Amalfitani Stadium
31 March 2009	Recife	Brazil	Pernambuco Jockey Club
2 April 2009	Sunrise, Florida	United States	BankAtlantic Center

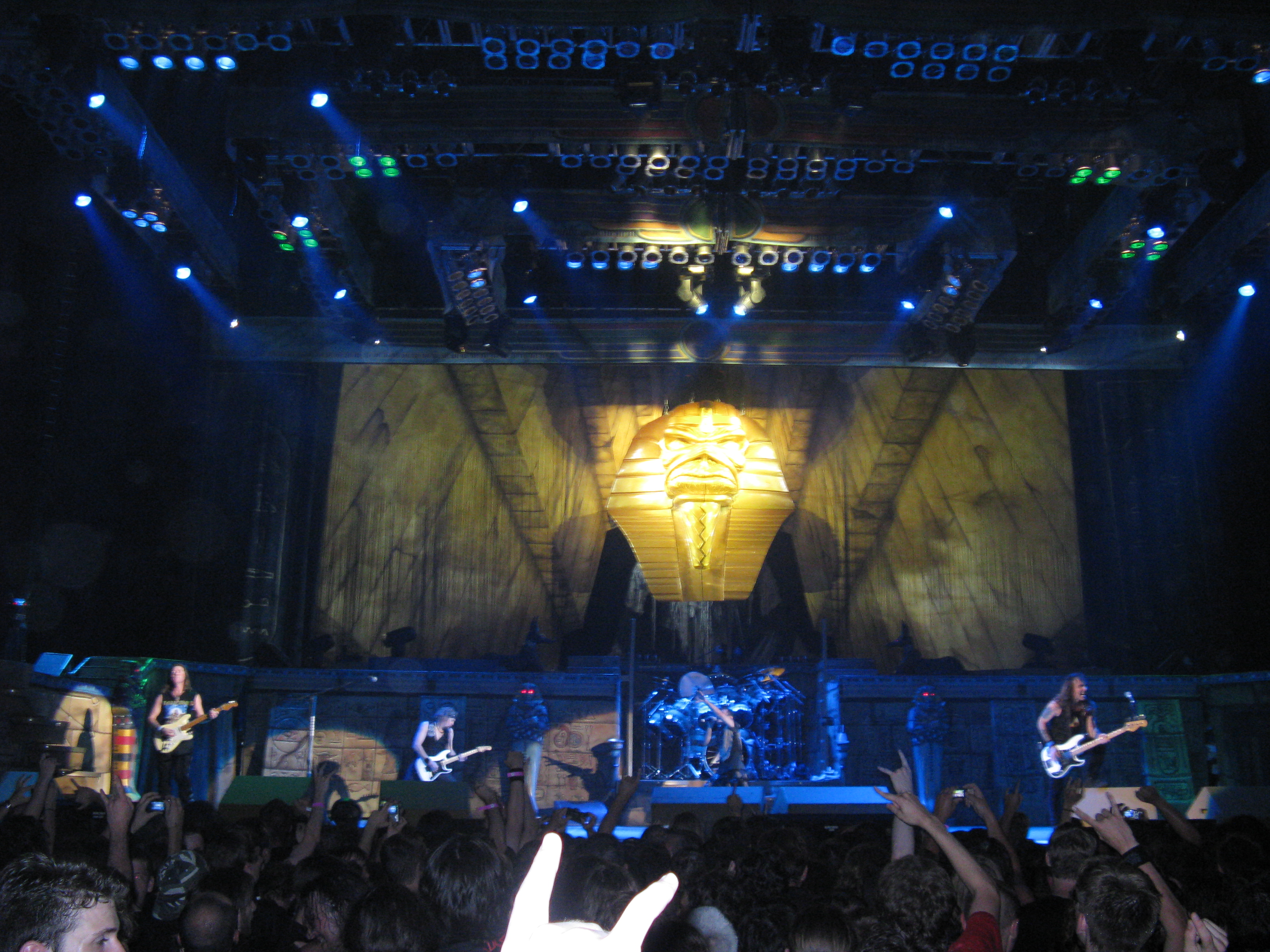
Iron Maiden in Paris, 1 July 2008.

- According to sponsors and the Flight 666 documentary, the concert held in Costa Rica was the largest in Central America, with over 27,000 attendants.
- The Metalway Festival appearance was cancelled due to extremely bad weather.
- The European Leg was the biggest sales achievement in band's career. Most shows were sold out in rapid time and streams of tickets were officially extra added due to high demand. The band's performance at Wacken Open Air in 2008 was their largest festival performance of the year. According to Metal Hammer DE, "...not less than 83.000 metal maniacs from all over the world attended this show".
- On the Latin American Leg in 2009 Iron Maiden played 16 gigs to well over half a million people. Their show at Autodromo de Interlagos had the biggest attendance for a rock music event in history of the venue.
