= Neil Peart: No One's Disciple =

2026 film by Scot McFadyen and Sam Dunn

Neil Peart: No One's Disciple is a 2026 documentary film exploring the career of Rush drummer and lyricist Neil Peart, directed by Scot McFadyen and Sam Dunn, who previously directed the 2010 documentary Rush: Beyond the Lighted Stage. It features new interviews with his bandmates and close friends, alongside archive interviews with Peart himself.

The film is built around footage from a session in which four of Peart's drumming friends - Danny Carey from Tool, Stewart Copeland from The Police, Gavin Harrison from King Crimson and Chad Smith from Red Hot Chili Peppers - pay tribute to him by each attempting to play two Rush songs with Geddy Lee and Alex Lifeson.

An epilogue describes how this session helped motivate Lee and Lifeson to revive the band and why they chose Anika Nilles as their touring drummer.

The film premiered at the Toronto International Film Festival and was shown in Canada by the CBC Television and available on CBC Gem.

== Interviewees ==
Adapted from the end credits:

=== Featuring ===
- Geddy Lee & Alex Lifeson (Rush)

=== Starring ===
- Danny Carey (Tool)
- Stewart Copeland (The Police)
- Gavin Harrison (King Crimson)
- Anika Nilles (Rush touring drummer)
- Chad Smith (Red Hot Chili Peppers)

=== Also featuring ===
- Brad French (lifelong friend)
- Doane Perry (Jethro Tull)
- Nick Raskulinecz (Rush producer)
- Matt Scannell (Vertical Horizon)
- Lorne "Gump" Wheaton (drum tech)
