= Any Other Way: The Jackie Shane Story =

2024 Canadian documentary film

- Film poster
- Directed by: Michael Mabbott; Lucah Rosenberg-Lee
- Written by: Michael Mabbott; Lucah Rosenberg-Lee; Alison Duke
- Produced by: Amanda Burt; Sam Dunn; Michael Mabbott; Scot McFadyen; Justine Pimlott
- Starring: Jackie Shane
- Cinematography: Adam Crosby
- Edited by: Mike Munn
- Music by: Murray Lightburn
- Production companies: Banger Films; National Film Board of Canada
- Distributed by: National Film Board of Canada
- Release date: March 9, 2024 (SXSW)
- Running time: 99 minutes
- Country: Canada
- Language: English

Any Other Way: The Jackie Shane Story is a 2024 Canadian documentary film, directed by Michael Mabbott and Lucah Rosenberg-Lee. The film is a portrait of Jackie Shane, the pioneering transgender singer who was a prominent figure in the Toronto music scene in the 1960s before virtually disappearing from public life after 1971.

== Production ==
The film was based in large part on telephone interviews that Mabbott conducted with Shane over the year before her death in 2019. As her death precluded the ability to videotape any new interviews in person, and very little video footage of Shane from the 1960s survives, the producers depict her in the film through the use of animation, generated by superimposing photos of Shane over rotoscoped footage of contemporary drag performer Makayla Couture.

Production on the film was announced in 2022. According to Rosenberg-Lee, the film benefitted from the contrast between Mabbott's knowledge about Shane and Rosenberg-Lee's relative lack of knowledge.

The film includes archival footage of Shane performing Rufus Thomas's "Walking the Dog" on the Nashville rhythm and blues television program Night Train in 1965. The footage is the only known video recording of Shane.

== Distribution ==
The film premiered at the 2024 SXSW festival.

It had its Canadian premiere at the 2024 Hot Docs Canadian International Documentary Festival, and was screened as the closing film of the 2024 DOXA Documentary Film Festival.

== Reception ==
On the review aggregator website Rotten Tomatoes, 100% of 12 critics' reviews are positive, with an average rating of 8.5/10.

In a positive review, Dennis Harvey of Variety wrote, "Michael Mabbott and Lucah Rosenberg-Lee's documentary Any Other Way combines archival materials, interviews and animated reenactments into a compelling investigation of an elusive life, as well as a talent so striking you'll be amazed it remained forgotten for so long."

The film was named to the Toronto International Film Festival's annual Canada's Top Ten list for 2024.

=== Awards ===
At Hot Docs, the film was awarded the DGC Ontario Special Jury Prize from the Best Canadian Feature Documentary award jury. At Frameline, the film won the Out In The Silence Award, which is given to an outstanding film project that highlights brave acts of LGBTQ+ visibility in places where such acts are not common.

The film was named the winner of the Rogers Best Canadian Documentary Award at the Toronto Film Critics Association Awards 2024.

Murray Lightburn won the Canadian Screen Award for Best Original Music in a Documentary at the 13th Canadian Screen Awards in 2025.
