= Global Metal =

- Directed by: Sam Dunn; Scot McFadyen
- Produced by: Sam Dunn; Scot McFadyen; Sam Feldman
- Starring: Sam Dunn
- Cinematography: Martin Hawkes
- Edited by: Christopher Donaldson; Lisa Grootenboer
- Production company: Banger Films
- Distributed by: Seville Pictures; Warner Home Video
- Release dates: 17 October 2007 (Bergen International Film Festival); 20 June 2008
- Running time: 93 minutes
- Language: English

Global Metal is a 2007 documentary film directed by Scot McFadyen and Canadian anthropologist Sam Dunn. It is a follow-up to their successful 2005 documentary, Metal: A Headbanger's Journey. The film's international premiere took place at the Bergen International Film Festival on 17 October 2007. Global Metal aims to show the impact of globalization on the heavy metal underground as well as how different people from different cultures are transforming heavy metal music.

== Interviews ==
As in Metal: A Headbanger's Journey, most of the information in the film comes in the form of interviews:

=== Rio de Janeiro and São Paulo, Brazil ===
Artist	Band	Nationality
Rafael Bittencourt	Angra	Brazil
Carlos "Vândalo" Lopes	Dorsal Atlântica	Brazil
Adrian Smith	Iron Maiden	United Kingdom
Dave Murray	Iron Maiden	United Kingdom
Max Cavalera	Sepultura, Soulfly, Cavalera Conspiracy	Brazil

Non musicians

- Claudia Azevedo, University of Rio de Janeiro
- Eric de Haas, Rock Hard Brazil
- Toninho, Sepultura fan club

=== Tokyo, Japan ===
Artist	Band	Nationality
Tom Araya	Slayer	Chile / US
Kerry King	Slayer	US
Lars Ulrich	Metallica	Denmark / US
Marty Friedman	Megadeth, Cacophony	US
Yoshiki	X Japan	Japan
Mirai Kawashima	Sigh	Japan

Non musicians

- Masa Itoh, Rock City TV
- Katsuya Minamida, Kobe University

=== Mumbai and Bangalore, India ===
Artist	Band	Nationality
Sahil Makhija (Demonstealer)	Demonic Resurrection	India
Prashant Shah	Exhumation	India
Nolan Lewis	Kryptos	India
Anant Dwivedi	Prakalp	India
Vincent Pereira	Prakalp	India
Sai Prabhakaran	Souled Out	India
Bruce Dickinson	Iron Maiden	United Kingdom

Non musicians

- Atul Sharma, MetalIndia.net

=== Beijing, China ===
Artist	Band	Nationality
Kaiser Kuo	Spring and Autumn, ex-Tang Dynasty	US
Nong Yong	Ritual Day	China

Non musicians

- Wang Xiao, 666 Rock Shop owner
- Yang Yu, Painkiller
- Zhang Feng, MIDI School principal

=== Jakarta, Indonesia ===
Artist	Band	Nationality
Barney Greenway	Napalm Death	United Kingdom
Max Cavalera	Sepultura, Soulfly, Cavalera Conspiracy	Brazil
Lars Ulrich	Metallica	Denmark / United States of America
Andre Tiranda	Siksakubur	Indonesia
Arian 13	Seringai	Indonesia
Ombat Nasution	Tengkorak	Indonesia
Tashea Delaney	Pain Killer	Indonesia

Non musicians

- Wendi Putranto, Rolling Stone Indonesia
- Jason Tedjasukmana, Time Indonesia
- Franki Raden, professor, York University, Toronto, Canada
- Rudi Iman, fan

=== Jerusalem, Israel ===
Artist	Band	Nationality
Kobi Farhi	Orphaned Land	Israel
Eran Segal	Whorecore	Israel
"Evil" Haim	Whorecore	Israel
Butchered	Arallu	Israel
Nir Nakav	Salem	Israel
Yotam "Defiler" Avni	Abed	Israel

Non musicians

- Yishai Sweartz, Raven Music
- Maor Appelbaum, producer/engineer

=== Dubai, United Arab Emirates ===
Artist	Band	Nationality
Ali	Kahtmayan	Iran
Maher	Crimson	Saudi Arabia
Ahmid	Crimson	Saudi Arabia
Al-Sharif	Hate Suffocation, Scarab	Egypt
Barney Ribeiro	Nervecell	Portugal / UAE

Non musicians

- Armin, fan - Iran
- Abed, fan – Lebanon
- Omar Abdula Aziz Mohammed Khan Abdula, fan – Dubai

== Songs in the movie ==
- "Fight Fire With Fire" - Metallica
- "Overkill" - Motörhead
- "Vou Festejar" - Hipnose
- "Coisinha Do Pai" - Hipnose
- "Rock You Like A Hurricane" - Scorpions
- "2 Minutes To Midnight" - Iron Maiden
- "Beneath The Remains" - Sepultura
- "Mass Hypnosis" - Sepultura
- "Roots Bloody Roots" - Sepultura
- "Kaiowas" - Sepultura
- "Walk With Me In Hell" - Lamb of God
- "War Ensemble" - Slayer
- "Highway Star" - Deep Purple
- "Rock And Roll All Nite" - Kiss
- "Elixir" - Marty Friedman
- "Death Panda Death" - Marty Friedman and AKB48
- "Danger Zone That I Want To Eat And Lick" - Sex Machineguns
- "X" - X Japan
- "Art of Life" - X Japan
- "Me Devil" - Sigh
- "Banno Ki Saheli" - Jatin–Lalit, Sandesh Shandilya and Aadesh Shrivastava.
- "Golden Memories"
- "Kalluri Vaanil" - Prabhu Deva
- "Apocalyptic Dawn" - Demonic Resurrection
- "Boiled Unwound Filatured" - Bhayanak Maut
- "Legend" - Spring & Autumn
- "Ritual Day" - Ritual Day
- "Epic" - Tang Dynasty
- "Mo/Monster" - Voodookungfu
- "Damage Inc." - Metallica
- "Inner Self" - Sepultura
- "Creeping Death" - Metallica
- "Parade Luka" - Siksakubur
- "Jihad Soldiers" - Tengkorak
- "Akselerasi Maksimum" - Seringai
- "El Meod Na'ala" - Orphaned Land
- "Morbid Shadow" - Arallu
- "Act of War/Act of Terror" - Salem
- "Angel of Death" - Slayer
- "Ornaments of Gold" - Orphaned Land
- "Daramad"
- "Egyptian Festival"
- "Raining Blood" (Slayer cover) - SDS
- "Raining Blood" - Slayer
- "Cloud Connected" - In Flames
- "Fear of the Dark" (live in Bangalore, India) - Iron Maiden
- "Hallowed Be Thy Name" (live in Bangalore, India) - Iron Maiden

== Soundtrack ==
There was a soundtrack released on 24 July featuring music from various metal bands all around the world, including bands from Israel, China, India, Indonesia, Iran and Japan

=== Disc 1 ===
1. "Inner Self" - Sepultura (Brazil)
2. "Walk with Me in Hell" - Lamb of God (United States)
3. "Ladders to Sumeria" - Melechesh (Israel/Netherlands)
4. "X" (Live) - X Japan (Japan)
5. "Ornaments of Gold" - Orphaned Land (Israel)
6. "Crystal Skull" (Live At the Dubai Desert Rock Festival)- Mastodon (United States)
7. "Havenless" - Enslaved (Norway)
8. "Me-Devil" - Sigh (Japan)
9. "Cloud Connected" - (Live At the Dubai Desert Rock Festival) - In Flames (Sweden)

=== Disc 2 ===
10. "Indigenous Laceration" - Chthonic (Taiwan)
11. "Salvation Suicide" - Angra (Brazil)
12. "Jaktens Tid" - Finntroll (Finland)
13. "From The Sky" - Gojira (France)
14. "Epic" - 唐朝 Tang Dynasty (China)
15. "Jihad Soldier" - Tengkorak (Indonesia)
16. "Baptized" - Arthimoth (Iran)
17. "Wings Of Time" - Týr (Faroe Islands)
18. "Apocalyptic Dawn" - Demonic Resurrection (India)
