= Mike Munn =

Canadian film and television editor (born 1959)

Mike Munn CCE (born April 26, 1959) is a Canadian film and television editor, who won the Canadian Screen Award for Best Editing in a Documentary at the 11th Canadian Screen Awards for his work on the film To Kill a Tiger. He was also a dual nominee in the same year for Batata.

He previously received three Gemini Award nominations for his work in television, with nods at the 12th Gemini Awards in 1998 for Time on Earth, the 18th Gemini Awards in 2003 for Dave Bidini: The Hockey Nomad, and the 19th Gemini Awards in 2004 for Youkali Hotel. He was the editor of Sarah Polley's documentary film Stories We Tell, for which he, Polley and David Forsyth won the Directors Guild of Canada's DGC Team Award in 2013.

== Filmography ==
=== Film ===
- Roadkill - 1989
- Masala - 1991
- Tectonic Plates - 1992
- Picture of Light - 1994
- Anchor Zone - 1994
- Lulu - 1996
- Time on Earth - 1997
- City of Dark - 1997
- The Law of Enclosures - 2003
- The Travellers: This Land Is Your Land - 2001
- Past Perfect - 2002
- Owning Mahowny - 2003
- Fast Food High - 2003
- It's for You! - 2003
- Ice Men - 2004
- Wilby Wonderful - 2004
- Metal: A Headbanger's Journey - 2005
- Cake - 2005
- Comeback Season - 2006
- Citizen Duane - 2006
- Iron Maiden: Flight 666 - 2009
- Rush: Beyond the Lighted Stage - 2010
- Stories We Tell - 2012
- Mad Ship - 2012
- Satan Lives - 2015
- Modified - 2017
- Trench 11 - 2017
- Youth Unstoppable - 2018
- Midian Farm - 2018
- This Is Not a Movie - 2019
- Drive - 2020
- Batata - 2022
- To Kill a Tiger - 2022
- Any Other Way: The Jackie Shane Story - 2024

=== Television ===
- Real Kids, Real Adventures - 1997
- Time on Earth - 1998
- Flying Rhino Junior High - 1998
- The Hockey Nomad - 2003
- Le Mozart noir - 2003
- Sibs - 2003
- Youkali Hotel - 2003
- The Shields Stories - 2004
- Is It Art? - 2007
- Will You Merry Me? - 2008
- Diamonds - 2009
- Metal Evolution - 2011-12
- Grizzly Cup - 2013
- Hip-Hop Evolution - 2016
- Is There a Killer in My Family? - 2020
- K-Pop Evolution - 2021
- This Is Pop - 2021
- Summit '72 - 2022
