= Arallu =

Israeli extreme metal band

- Origin: Ma'ale Adumim
- Genres: Black metal, thrash metal, oriental metal, death metal, war metal
- Years active: 1999–present
- Labels: Hammerheart Records, Satanath Records, Essential Purification Records, Transcendering Obscurity Records, Raven Music, Legion of Death Records, The End Records, Epidemic
- Members: Moti "Butchered" Daniel; Richard Zwaigoft; Ofek Noy; Eylon Bart
- Past members: Avi Caspi; Yossi Darmon; Alex Schuster; Ben Fisher; Sergei "Metalheart" Nemichenitser; Yonathan Dushnitzki; Yaniv Zada; Gal "Pixel" Cohen; Assaf Kassimov; Omri Yagen

Arallu is an Israeli extreme metal band. As a member of the Jerusalem extreme metal scene, Arallu has "thrived off the seeming contradiction of its location within a 'holy' city."

== History ==
Arallu was created as the solo project of Moti Daniel, a bassist who has performed live with Melechesh. The debut album The War on the Wailing Wall was released in 2001 and featured "a drum machine programmed to ludicrous speed". In 2002, Arallu released their "iconoclastic" second album, Satanic War in Jerusalem. Nir Nakav of Salem played drums, including the traditional goblet drum while, Daniel performed all other instruments and vocals. The album featured a cover of Slayer's "Evil Has No Boundaries". Daniel expanded the band's line-up after the release of this album, and a DVD Visual Chaos Invasion was released the following year.

In September 2003, Daniel's brother was kidnapped and held for ransom by guerrillas from the Colombian organisation Ejército de Liberación Nacional. Daniel successfully negotiated his brother's release.

The release of Arallu's 2005 third album, The Demon From The Ancient World, featured guest performers from Israeli acts, including Zeev Tananboim of Salem. Daniel guested on Salem's Strings Attached album.

In September 2007, Arallu opened for Mayhem in Tel Aviv. Their fourth album, Desert Battles - Descending to the Sands, was released in 2009. Footage from the performance was scheduled for release in 2010 as the band's second DVD, The Ultimate War.

In January 2008, Arallu was interviewed for the movie Global Metal by Sam Dunn.

On August 28, 2009, the band opened for Behemoth at the Barby club in Tel Aviv, along with Arafel.

In September 2011, the band went on their first European tour, playing five dates between September 9–13, 2011, in Germany, Switzerland and Austria.

In October 2012, the band went on their second European tour, playing five dates between October 19–28 in Austria, Switzerland and Hungary .

Between October 22–25, the band recorded the single "Desert Genii Storm" in Sourmash Studio in Switzerland. It was produced by Dave Snow. In May 2013, the band opened for Enslaved at riding Tel Aviv. In October 2013, the band went on their third European tour, playing eight Dates between October 18– November 3 in Austria, Hungary, Switzerland and Germany.

== Style ==
Arallu performs black metal with oriental influences and touches of thrash metal. Critic Roberto Marinelli describes their style as "reminiscent of early Venom, Sodom, and Voivod: thrashy, monochromatic, underproduced and full of ideas that far outstrip their abilities". Daniel has remarked in an interview that Arallu's style has to be oriental, thrashy and barbaric "all at once".

== Band members ==
- Moti "Butchered" Daniel - lead vocals, bass (1997–present) drum programming (1997-2001), guitars (1997-2003)
- Eylon Bart - saz, darbuka, backing vocals (2016–present)
- Richard Zwaigoft - drums (2019–present)
- Ofek Noy - guitar (2019–present)

=== Former members ===
- Yonatan Dushnitzki - drums, percussion (2003–2014)
- Sergei "Metalheart" Nemichenitser - guitars (2010–2013)
- Yossi Darmon - guitars (2004–2010)
- Avi Caspi - guitars (1999–2007)
- Alex Schuster - guitars (2003–2004)
- Ben Fisher - drums, percussion (2001–2003)
- Yaniv Zada - "soul beating" doom percussion instruments, wind instruments (2006–2010)
- Gal "Pixel" Cohen - guitars, backing vocals (2007–2021)
- Omri Yagen - guitars (2014–2019)
- Assaf Kassimov - drums, percussion (2014–2019)

== Discography ==
=== Studio albums ===
- The War on the Wailing Wall (1999, re-released 2009)
- Satanic War in Jerusalem (2002, re-released 2011)
- The Demon from the Ancient World (2005)
- Desert Battles - Descending to the Sands (2009, re-released 2018)
- GENIEWAR (2015)
- Six (2017)
- En Olam (2019)
- Death Covenant (2022)

=== EPs ===
- At War against God (2001)
- Magen Jerusalem 7" (2009)
- Arallu/Werewolf 7" (2023)

=== DVDs ===
- Visual Chaos Invasion (2003)
- The Ultimate War (2010)
- Middle Eastern Battlefield (2016)
