= Scot McFadyen =

Canadian film director and producer

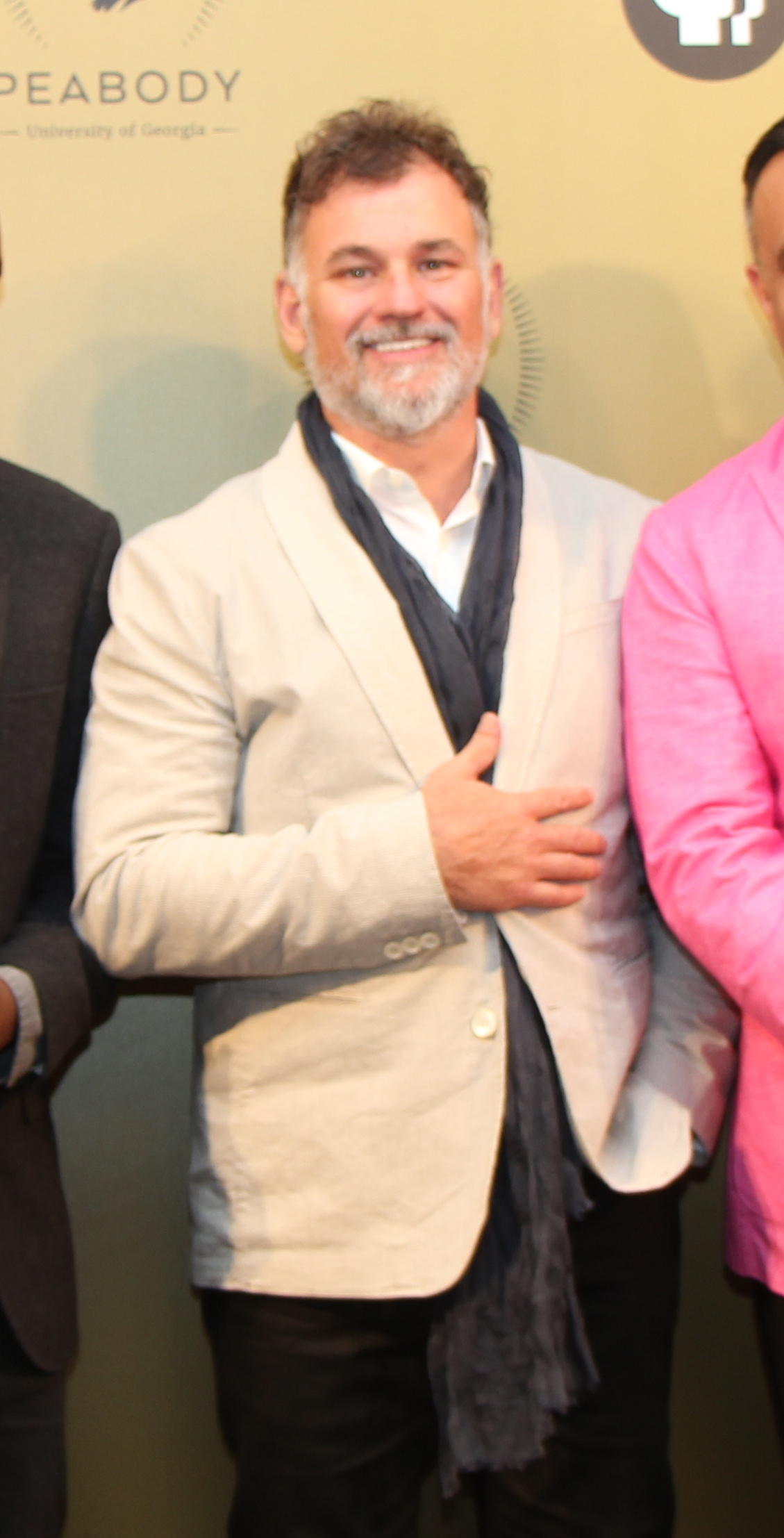
- Born: Toronto, Ontario, Canada
- Occupations: director, producer, music supervisor
- Awards: 2007 Gemini Award for Metal: A Headbanger's Journey; 2009 SXSW Viewers Choice Award for Iron Maiden: Flight 666; 2010 Tribeca Film Festival Audience Award for Rush: Beyond The Lighted Stage

Scot McFadyen is a Canadian film director, producer and music supervisor whose work focuses on the subculture of heavy metal. He co-owns Toronto-based production company Banger Films with Sam Dunn.

== Films ==
=== Metal: A Headbanger's Journey ===
McFadyen's first film, co-directed with Dunn and Jessica Wise, was released in 2005. The film follows Dunn on a journey to document the origins, culture and appeal of heavy metal. It also explores the themes of heavy metal: violence, death, religion and Satanism, gender and sexuality.

=== Global Metal ===
Released in 2008, McFadyen and Dunn co-directed a new film, Global Metal. In the film, McFadyen and Dunn set out to discover how the West’s most maligned musical genre — heavy metal — has impacted the world’s cultures beyond Europe and North America. The film follows metal fan, host and anthropologist Sam Dunn on a whirlwind journey through Asia, South America and the Middle East as he explores the underbelly of the world’s emerging extreme music scenes from Indonesian death metal to Israeli Oriental metal and Chinese black metal to Iranian thrash metal, etc. The film reveals a worldwide community of metalheads who are not only absorbing metal from the West, but are also transforming it and creating a new form of cultural expression in societies dominated by conflict, corruption and mass consumerism.

=== Iron Maiden: Flight 666 ===
McFadyen and Dunn co-wrote and co-directed the 2009 documentary Iron Maiden: Flight 666. The film chronicles the band's 2008 tour in which a converted Boeing 757 was flown from country to country by vocalist Bruce Dickinson.

=== Rush: Beyond the Lighted Stage ===
In 2009, McFadyen and Dunn started working on a documentary about progressive metal band Rush. The film premiered at the 2010 Tribeca Film Festival in New York on April 29, winning the festival's Audience Award.

== Filmography ==
Year	Film
2005	Metal: A Headbanger's Journey
2008	Global Metal
2009	Iron Maiden: Flight 666
2010	Rush: Beyond The Lighted Stage
2011	Metal Evolution
2014	Super Duper Alice Cooper
2024	Any Other Way: The Jackie Shane Story
2026	Neil Peart: No One's Disciple
