= Sam Dunn =

Canadian documentary filmmaker

- Dunn at the 2026 Toronto International Film Festival
- Born: 20 March 1974 (age 52); Stroud, England
- Education: University of Victoria (B.A.); York University (M.A.)
- Occupations: Filmmaker, musician, anthropologist
- Awards: List: International Emmy Award in 2017 for Hip-Hop Evolution Canadian Screen Award in 2017 for Hip-Hop Evolution Peabody Award in 2016 for Hip-Hop Evolution Juno Award in 2011 for Rush: Beyond the Lighted Stage Tribeca Film Festival Audience Award in 2010 for Rush: Beyond The Lighted Stage SXSW Viewers Choice Award in 2009 for Iron Maiden: Flight 666 Gemini Award in 2007 for Metal: A Headbanger's Journey

Sam Dunn (born 20 March 1974) is a Canadian documentary filmmaker, musician, and anthropologist, best known for his series of documentaries on heavy metal music. He co-owns Toronto-based production company Banger Films with Scot McFadyen. Dunn holds a bachelor's degree in anthropology from the University of Victoria and a master's degree from York University where his thesis work focused on Guatemalan refugees.

Dunn's first documentary film, Metal: A Headbanger's Journey, won a Gemini Award for Best Writing in a Documentary. His additional credits include the Grammy-nominated Rush: Beyond the Lighted Stage and Super Duper Alice Cooper, winner of Best Feature-Length Documentary at the Canadian Screen Awards. Dunn co-directed and hosted the biggest-ever TV series on the history of heavy metal, Metal Evolution, which reached #1 on VH1 Classic (USA) and M3 (Canada), and most-recently co-directed the Netflix original series Hip-Hop Evolution which has been awarded a Peabody, an International Emmy, and a Canadian Screen Award.

== Films ==
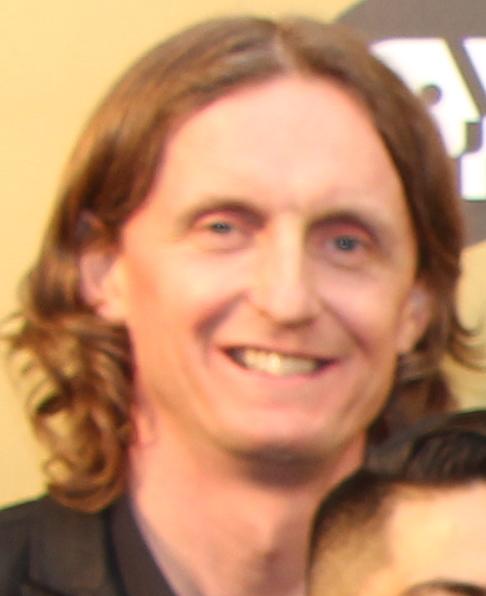
Dunn in 2017

=== Metal: A Headbanger's Journey ===
Dunn's first film, co-directed with Scot McFadyen and Jessica Wise, was released in 2005. The film follows Dunn on a journey to document the origins, culture and appeal of heavy metal. It also explores themes of heavy metal, such as violence, death, religion and Satanism, gender and sexuality. The documentary featured interviews with Geddy Lee of Rush and Bruce Dickinson of Iron Maiden, whose bands Dunn would profile in later documentaries.

=== Global Metal ===
Released in 2008, Sam directed a new film, titled Global Metal. In the film, directors Scot McFadyen and Sam Dunn set out to discover how the West’s most awesome musical genre – heavy metal – has impacted the world’s cultures beyond Europe and North America. The film follows metal fan and anthropologist Dunn on a whirlwind journey through Asia, South America and the Middle East as he explores the underbelly of the world’s emerging extreme music scenes — from Indonesian death metal to Israeli Oriental metal and Chinese black metal to Iranian thrash metal, etc. The film reveals a worldwide community of metalheads who are not just absorbing metal from the West – they are transforming it, and creating a new form of cultural expression in societies dominated by conflict, corruption and mass-consumerism.

=== Iron Maiden: Flight 666 ===
Dunn co-wrote and co-directed the 2009 documentary Iron Maiden: Flight 666 with Scot McFadyen. The film chronicles the band's 2008 tour in which a converted Boeing 757 was flown from country to country by Iron Maiden vocalist Bruce Dickinson.

=== Rush: Beyond the Lighted Stage ===
In 2009 Sam Dunn and Scot McFadyen started working on a documentary about Rush. The film premiered at the 2010 Tribeca Film Festival in New York on April 29, winning the festival's Audience Award.

=== Metal Evolution ===
Dunn has produced the documentary series Metal Evolution for VH1 Classic on various metal genres. Its premiere was on November 11, 2011, considered by many to be National Metal Day.

=== Time Machine 2011: Live in Cleveland ===
Is a concert DVD, Blu-ray and double CD by Canadian hard rock band Rush released on November 8, 2011. It was filmed on April 15, 2011 at the Quicken Loans Arena in Cleveland, Ohio during the band's Time Machine Tour.

=== En Vivo! ===
En Vivo! is a live/video album by British heavy metal band Iron Maiden. Filmed during The Final Frontier World Tour at Estadio Nacional, Santiago, Chile on April 10, 2011, it was released on March 26, 2012 and March 27 in the United States and Canada.

=== Satan Lives ===
Released October 27, 2015, this movie examines the origins of Satan and his influence in popular culture.

=== ZZ Top: That Little Ol' Band from Texas ===
Dunn directed ZZ Top: That Little Ol' Band from Texas, a profile of the Texas blues rock band ZZ Top, featuring interviews with vocalist/guitarist Billy Gibbons, bassist/vocalist Dusty Hill, and drummer Frank Beard. The film had a Los Angeles premiere at the Cinerama Dome on August 13, 2019, prior to the band's 50th anniversary tour. The documentary was released to home media on February 28, 2020, and Netflix shortly after.

== Musical activities ==
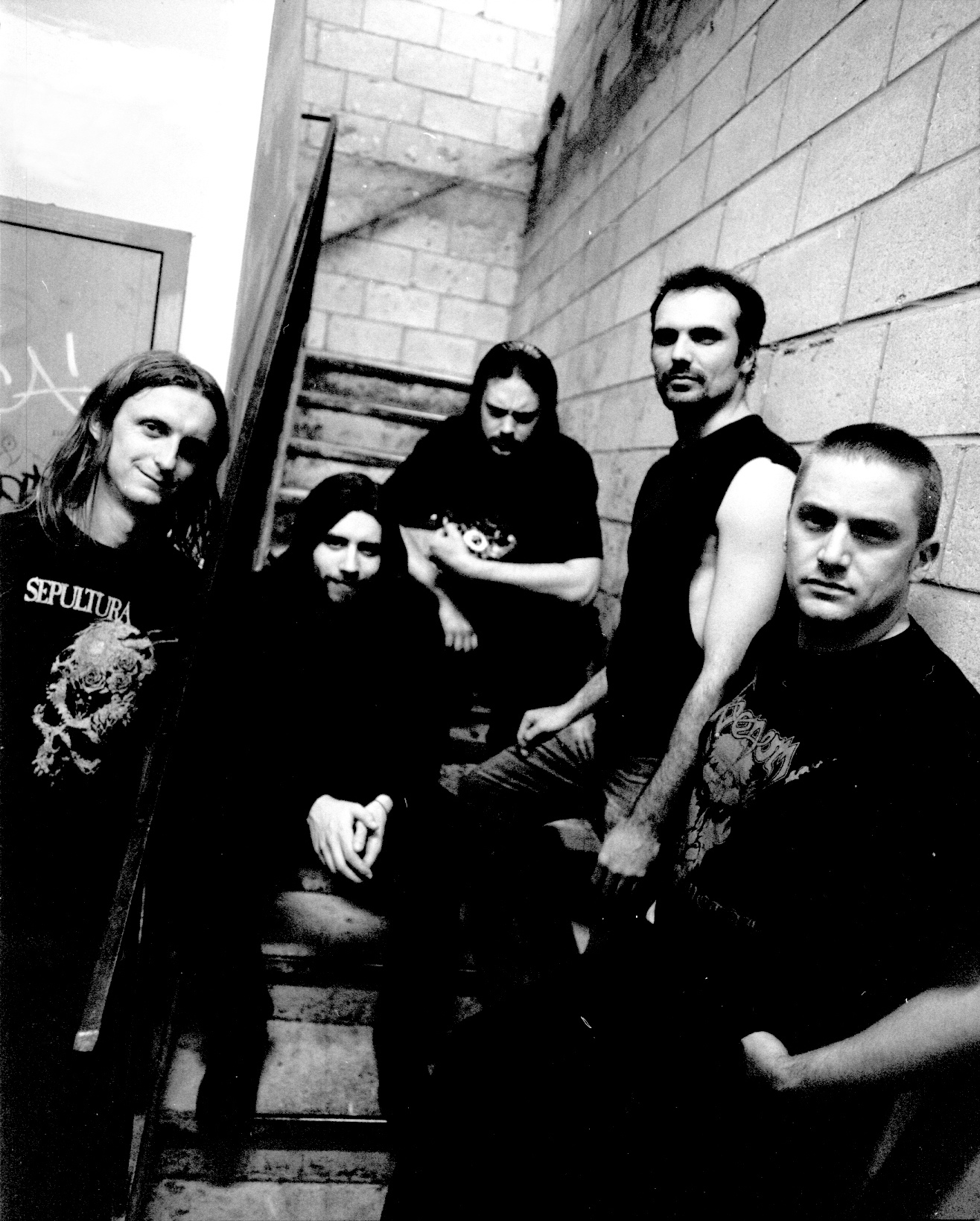
Burn to Black in 2006 (L-R: Sam Dunn, Paul Harrington, Evan Johnston, Rob Ouellette, Alex Zubair)

Dunn formerly played bass for the ska/funk band Fungkus; they disbanded in 2000. Dunn also formerly played bass for Toronto-based extreme metal band Burn to Black; they disbanded in November 2008. One of Sam Dunn's first bands was Dementia, in which he played bass. He also formed the progressive thrash metal band Scrape Chamber years later with Kelly Nordstrom. Dunn now occasionally plays bass for the Toronto band Machado and His Men.

== Filmography ==
Year	Film
2005	Metal: A Headbanger's Journey (documentary)
2008	Global Metal (documentary)
2009	Iron Maiden: Flight 666 (documentary)
2009	Joe Bonamassa:Live From the Royal Albert Hall
2010	Rush: Beyond the Lighted Stage (documentary)
2011	Metal Evolution (TV documentary series)
2011	Time Machine 2011: Live in Cleveland (Rush concert film)
2011	Motörhead: The Wörld Is Ours – Vol. 1: Everywhere Further Than Everyplace Else
2011	That Metal Show (Season 9, episode 2. - guest)
2012	En Vivo! (Iron Maiden concert film)
2014	Gaming Show (In My Parents Garage) (TV series)
2014	Super Duper Alice Cooper
2015	Banger TV (Lock Horns, Overkill)
2015	Rock Icons (TV series documentary)
2015	Satan Lives (documentary)
2016	We Are Savvy (TV series)
2016	Hip-Hop Evolution (TV documentary series)
2019	ZZ Top: That Little Ol' Band from Texas (documentary)
2021	Triumph: Rock & Roll Machine (documentary)
2024	Any Other Way: The Jackie Shane Story
2026	Neil Peart: No One's Disciple
