= Gwardia Warsaw Stadium =

Former multi-use stadium in Warsaw, Poland

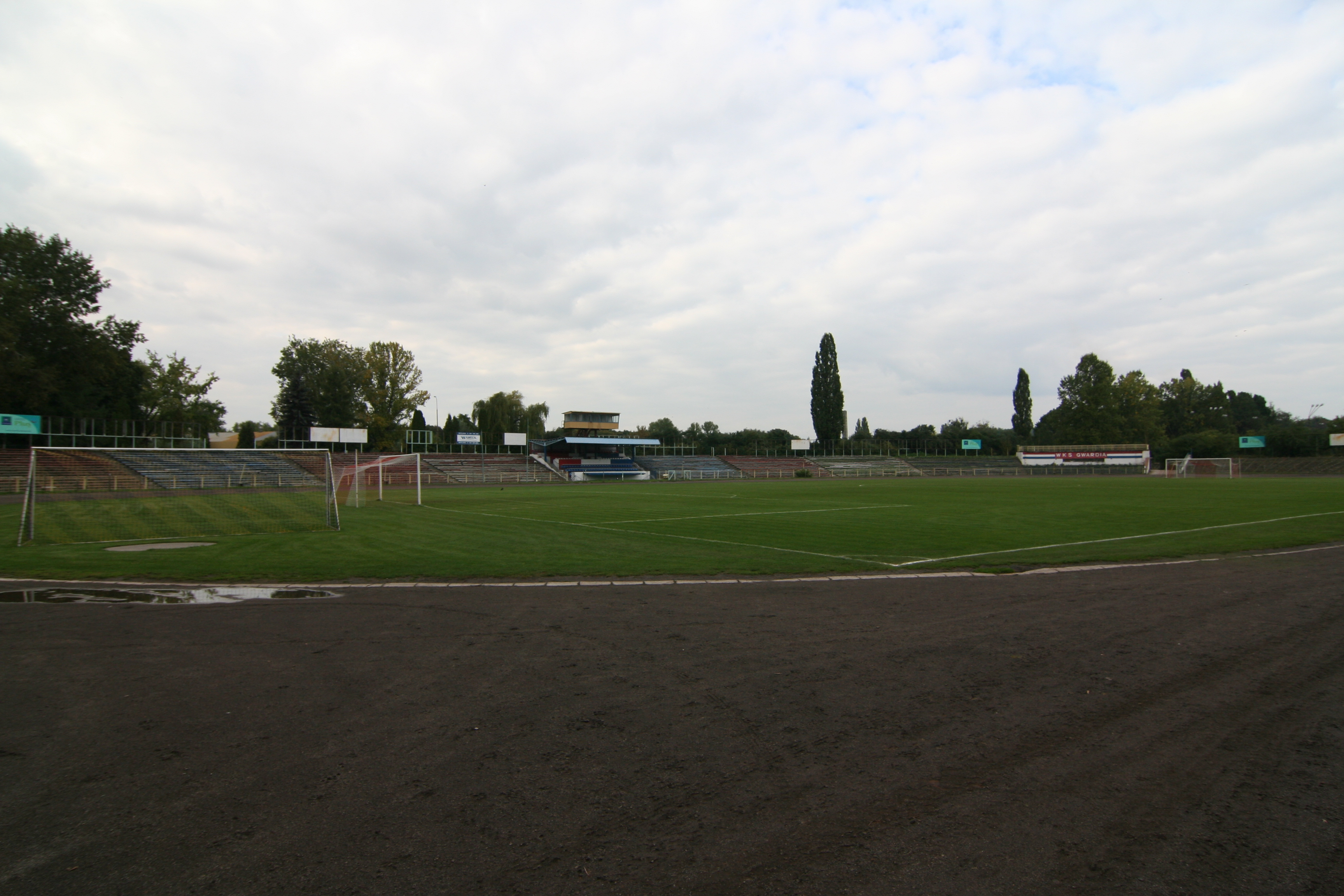
- The stadium in 2008
- Location: Racławicka 132, 01-999 Warsaw, Poland
- Coordinates: 52°11′57″N 20°59′32″E
- Capacity: 9,000
- Closed: 2012

The Gwardia Warsaw Stadium (Polish: Stadion Gwardii Warszawa) was a 9,000-capacity multi-use stadium in Warsaw, Poland. It was primarily used for association football and later motorcycle speedway.

== History ==
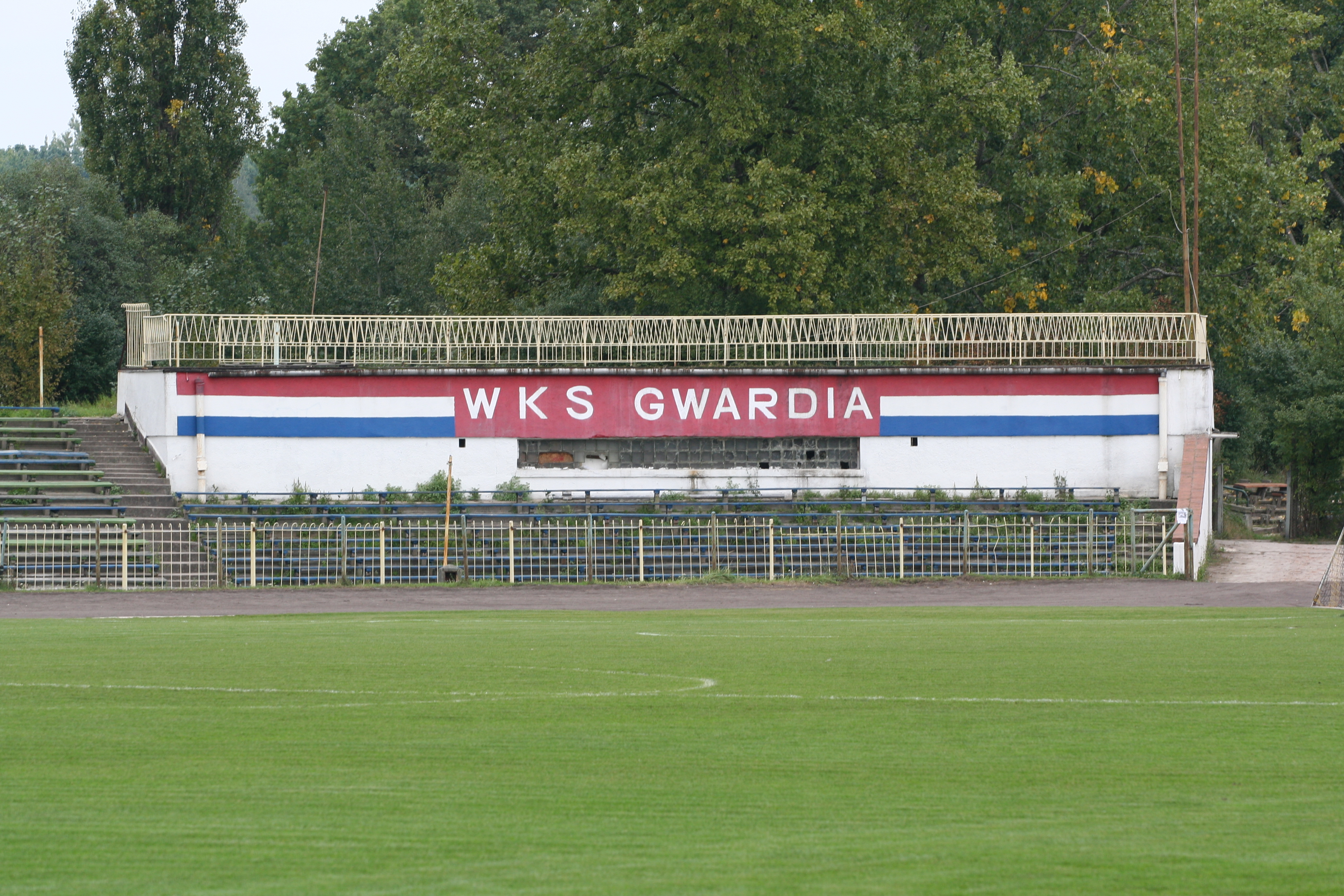

The site was originally part of the Mokotów Airport from 1910 to 1947 before being developed for sport. From the 1950s, it contained a football and speedway stadium, training pitches, tennis courts and swimming facilities.

In 1955, it was handed over to the Gwardia Warsaw sports club, although the land remained in the ownership of the State Treasury.

The facility at Racławicka Street hosted important home fixtures for the Gwardia Warsaw football team, although the most significant ones such as the 1955–56 European Cup and 1957–58 European Cup were held at the Polish Army Stadium.

In 1971, the site came under management of the Ministry of Internal Affairs.

In 1993, the 383m long athletics track was removed and in 2000, forty years after the last speedway in Warsaw the Gwardia Warsaw sports club introduced a speedway section and a team by the name of WSŻ Gwardia Warszawa entered the 2000 Polish speedway season in the Polish Speedway Second League, racing at the stadium. The 2002 season resulted in promotion to 1. Liga. but the 2003 1.Liga season was a disaster, WKM Warszawa ending the campaign bottom of the table with just four points and then disbanding.

Music concerts of world stars were also organised at the facility, including: Aerosmith (1994), Tina Turner (1996), Sting (1996 and 2001), Metallica (1999), Roger Waters (2002), Carlos Santana, Iron Maiden (2008) and Andrea Bocelli (2009).

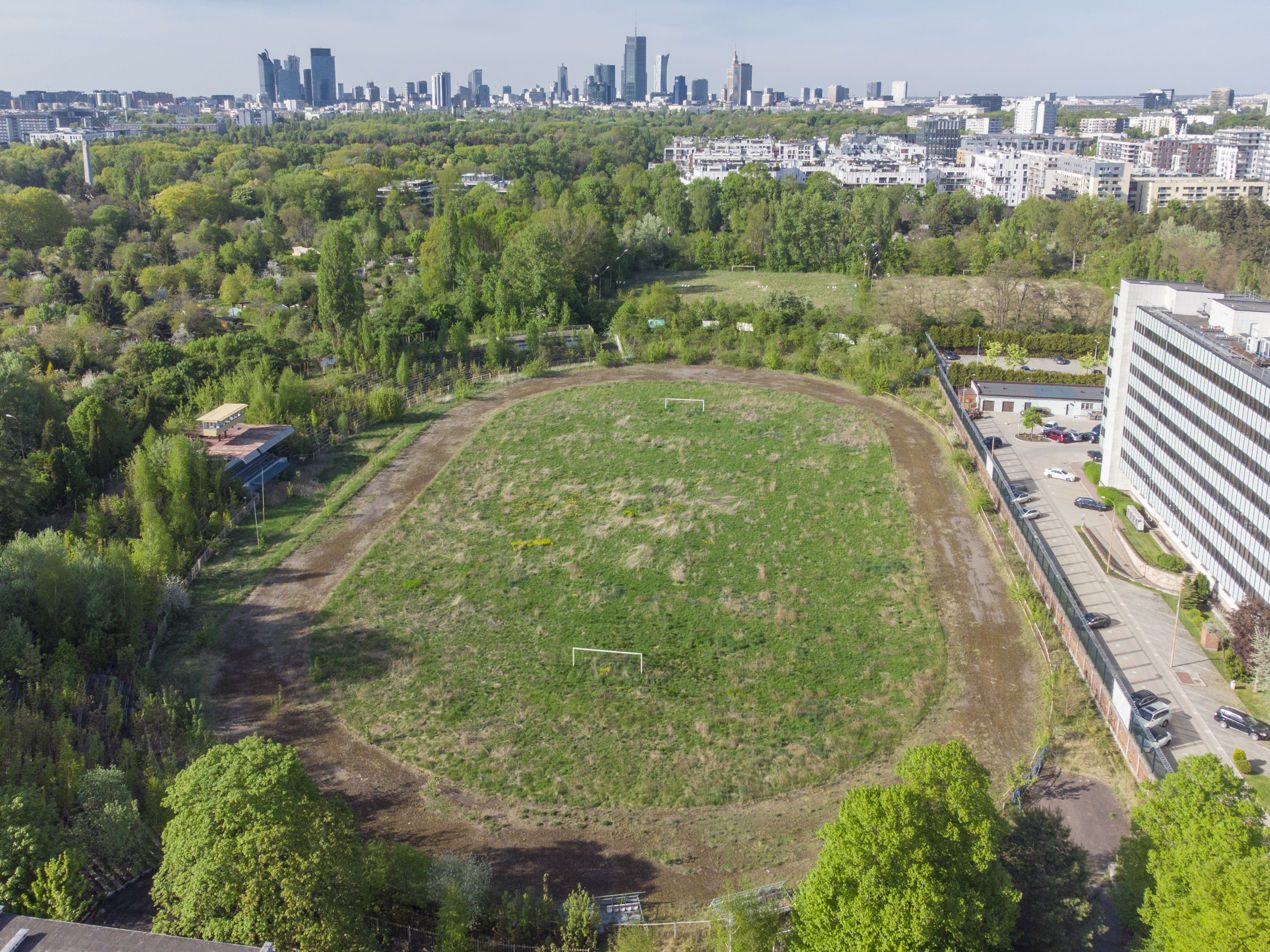
Site of the former stadium in 2022

In 2007, ownership of the site was taken over by the Police. In 2012, the stadium was closed due to its poor condition and since 2019, it has been owned by the Internal Security Agency.
