= Metal Evolution =

2011 Canadian documentary television series

- Also known as: Metal Evolution: The Series
- Genre: Documentary
- Created by: Sam Dunn; Scot McFadyen
- Written by: Ralph Chapman; Sam Dunn; Scot McFayden
- Directed by: Sam Dunn; Scot McFayden
- Presented by: Sam Dunn
- Theme music composer: Steve Harris
- Opening theme: "The Trooper" by Iron Maiden "Into the Crypts of Rays" by Celtic Frost ("Extreme Metal")
- No. of seasons: 1
- No. of episodes: 12

Production
- Producer: Banger Films
- Cinematography: Martin Hawkes
- Editors: Reginald Harkema; Mike Munn; Alex Shuper; Matthew Walsh

Original release
- Network: MuchMore, VH1 Classic
- Release: 11 November 2011 – 15 April 2014

Metal Evolution is a 2011 documentary series directed by anthropologist and filmmaker Sam Dunn and director, producer and music supervisor Scot McFadyen about heavy metal subgenres, with new episodes airing every Friday at 10 pm EST on MuchMore and Saturday at 10pm EST on VH1 Classic. Its origins come from Dunn's first documentary Metal: A Headbanger's Journey, which included the acclaimed "Heavy Metal Family Tree."

== Summary ==
Metal Evolution is broken down into episodes about a different piece of metal history. The series includes interviews with and about Alice Cooper, Slash, Lemmy, Rob Zombie, members of Megadeth, Metallica, Iron Maiden, Black Sabbath, Deep Purple, Slayer, Judas Priest, Van Halen, Whitesnake, Def Leppard, The Stooges, ZZ Top, Soundgarden, Mötley Crüe, Poison, Rage Against the Machine, Alice in Chains, Korn, Slipknot, Lamb of God and more.

== History ==
The series was created after feedback about Metal: A Headbanger's Journey debuted. "Some people said they wished that film was eight hours long," Dunn said. The "Heavy Metal Family Tree" from the documentary heavily influenced the Metal Evolution series, with the Banger Films official blog noting that using the 26-subgenre chart as a "road map, host/producer and metalhead turned anthropologist Sam Dunn, crisscrossed the globe exploring the vast history of heavy metal across its 40+ year history and beyond."

== Episodes ==
No.	Title	Original release date
1	"Pre Metal"	11 November 2011
Tracing the origins of metal is a phantasmagoric odyssey that traverses cities and countries, oceans and continents. For Sam Dunn, stop #1 on this heavy metal pilgrimage is the birthplace of metal's indisputable progenitor: rock 'n' roll.
2	"Early Metal Part 1: US Division"	19 November 2011
Metal morning in America begins with the clank of cars and guitars and the burning of draft cards, Including the likes of Ted Nugent & The Amboy Dukes, The Frost, Iggy & The Stooges and the explosive MC5 and of course Kiss.
3	"Early Metal Part 2: UK Division"	3 December 2011
The UK wasn't about to cede rock & roll dominance to America continuing with the success of bands that had captivated the U.S. ever since the insanity of The Beatles and the subsequent British Invasion. This documents how early blues-influenced British bands cranked up the amps and used distorted guitars to give the first pre-metal sounds from the likes of Led Zeppelin, Deep Purple, and of course Black Sabbath who most consider the first ever heavy metal band and are recognized for laying the blueprints of what became an entire genre of music. Although these bands didn't identify themselves with the label of heavy metal, that title was later embraced and given a distinct look and sound by Judas Priest.
4	"New Wave of British Heavy Metal"	10 December 2011
After the early metal bands Black Sabbath, Deep Purple and Judas Priest had become household names for headbangers, the next major music scene in the UK to emerge was punk in the mid 1970s. This was nothing metal fans wanted to associate with, yet there was still a small but faithful following of the underground metal scene. The movement began to grow and was spearheaded by the likes of Motörhead, Diamond Head and gained even more momentum when Iron Maiden began packing local clubs and later went on to sell millions of albums. The media and record labels could no longer ignore these bands and this became a major force in music that had to be reckoned with and was dubbed as the new wave of British heavy metal. Other notable acts which were part of this included Saxon, Tygers of Pan Tang, Angel Witch, Raven and Praying Mantis. The candle of NWOBHM began to flicker with the emergence of the glam band scene in the US although Def Leppard thrived in this environment as they had diverged into a more mainstream radio-friendly sound. However, it had a major effect on another movement in heavy metal music that was developing across the sea: Thrash.
5	"Glam"	17 December 2011
Purveyors of glam such as Mötley Crüe's Vince Neil and Michael Anthony of Van Halen, will divulge their side of the story, revealing the attitudes, influences and decisions which guided them during those heady days of rampant excess on L.A.'s storied Sunset Strip. Contemporary musicians like Scott Ian from Anthrax and Slash from Guns N' Roses will discuss the reasons behind the vilification of glam—the notion that glam reduced Metal to caricature, drawing on a shallow combination of pop cliché and sophomoric sexual pandering for its inspiration.
6	"Thrash"	31 December 2011
A new generation of American metal bands burst out of California and the East Coast. Headed up by Metallica, Anthrax, Slayer and Megadeth they combined influences from classic metal and the NWOBHM and took them to extremes of speed, subject matter and intensity. A few of the bands made platinum status in the early 90s before changing times and an exhausted scene faded away.
7	"Grunge"	7 January 2012
Sam explores grunge, a.k.a. the Seattle Sound, from a decidedly fresher approach, inspiring two fundamental questions: "Why did grunge polarize the Metal community?" and "What are the true roots of grunge?". The Melvins, Soundgarden, Nirvana, Alice in Chains and Pearl Jam are featured in this episode, as well as post-grunge bands Creed and Nickelback.
8	"Nu Metal"	14 January 2012
If hair metal was the antithesis of heavy metal purists in the eighties, that was delegated to nu metal in the late nineties. Likewise, if the keyboard was an instrument that such purists felt had no place in a heavy metal band, that disdain was now held by the incorporation of the turntable. Early influences came from bands such as Anthrax and their 1991 collaboration with Public Enemy, Faith No More, even thrashers whose riff-driven hooks were described as "groove metal", and Sepultura with their 1996 album Roots are given credit. This spawned the rise of a new genre of music influenced by two seemingly opposing forces: hip hop and hard rock. Nu metal broke ground and gave way to bands like Korn, Deftones, Rage Against the Machine, and Limp Bizkit. At the height of its popularity the show documents the unfortunate events that conspired in Woodstock in 1999 which included performances by Korn, Rage Against the Machine and Limp Bizkit leading to nu metal's decline soon thereafter. Yet the mantle has still been carried on by acts such as Linkin Park and Disturbed, among others.
9	"Shock Rock"	21 January 2012
Unlike any other genre profiled on the show, Shock Rock is defined by its visuals and public image, not by its sound. The genre has roots in Screamin' Jay Hawkins and Arthur Brown. This episode focuses on metal's impact in pushing the envelope when it came to disturbing and horrific imagery and its place as Public Enemy #1 to conservative America. From its first major figure in Alice Cooper in the 1970s, to early black metal pioneers Venom and Mercyful Fate (featuring the vocal histrionics of lead singer King Diamond) in the 1980s, to Marilyn Manson, who was made a scapegoat for the Columbine High School massacre of 1999. Slipknot and Rammstein are also featured.
10	"Power Metal"	28 January 2012
Completely alien to the genre, Sam Dunn sets off to find out what it's all about, and why it's so unfamiliar to him. Tracing its roots back to Europe, he analyzes the differences between traditional heavy metal and power metal, and identifies power metal's ties to European classical music and the way in which power metal flourishes with metal festivals such as Germany's Wacken Open Air and Slovenia's Metal Camp. Notable interviews include Yngwie Malmsteen, members of Blind Guardian, HammerFall, Helloween, Rhapsody, Kamelot, DragonForce and the band that took Power Metal to number one on the European charts: Finland's Nightwish (Tuomas Holopainen and former vocalist Tarja Turunen).
11	"Progressive Metal"	4 February 2012
The series finale of Metal Evolution features the subgenre progressive metal. Metal was influenced by progressive rock, which used textured sounds and intricate arrangements while incorporating the rock element in its own distinctive way. Modern prog rock most often cites the influences of the percussive guitar-playing of Steve Hackett of Genesis, and the instrumentals of Yes. Meanwhile, King Crimson added much to the development of the genre. Prog rock came to the forefront with the Canadian band Rush which is profiled in one-on-one interviews with the band's 3 members, Geddy Lee, Alex Lifeson and Neil Peart while on tour in Cleveland, Ohio. The nineties introduced the groundbreaking, innovative sounds of bands like Tool, Queensrÿche, Dream Theater, Mastodon, Meshuggah and The Dillinger Escape Plan.
12	"Extreme Metal: The Lost Episode"	15 April 2014 (released to crowdsourcing contributors)
Produced after the original series aired, this episode covers Florida Death Metal, Norwegian Black Metal, Grindcore, and other extreme subgenres. The episode was produced with the help of donations through IndieGoGo.

== Heavy Metal Family Tree ==
For Metal Evolution, Sam Dunn presented a new, updated version of his "Heavy Metal Family Tree," a 26-subgenre chart that mapped out metal's various subgenres that have spawned over the course of its 40-year history. This new, more elaborate version included a "Pre-History of Metal" field that listed non-metal musicians that had an influence on heavy metal. It also listed additional bands as examples of the various styles of metal. Some (but not all) of the subgenres were shown over the course of the series.

Pre-History of Metal
Niccolò Paganini; Richard Wagner; Gustav Holst; Howlin' Wolf; Robert Johnson; Buddy Rich; Elvis Presley; Little Richard; The Beatles; The Kinks; The Who; Cream; Jimi Hendrix

Progressive Rock
Jethro Tull; King Crimson; Emerson, Lake & Palmer; Yes; Genesis; Uriah Heep; Mahavishnu Orchestra; Journey; Styx; Kansas

Early Metal US
Dick Dale; Vanilla Fudge; Steppenwolf; Iron Butterfly; Blue Cheer; MC5; The Stooges; Alice Cooper; ZZ Top; Blue Öyster Cult; Aerosmith; Montrose; Kiss; Ted Nugent; Y&T; Van Halen

Early Metal UK
Deep Purple; Led Zeppelin; Black Sabbath; Budgie; The Sweet; Slade; Status Quo; Nazareth; Thin Lizzy; Queen; Judas Priest; AC/DC; Rainbow; Whitesnake

Shock Rock
Screamin' Jay Hawkins; Arthur Brown; Alice Cooper; New York Dolls; Kiss; Ozzy Osbourne; Venom; W.A.S.P.; King Diamond; Gwar; Marilyn Manson; Slipknot; Rammstein

Original Punk
Ramones; The Damned; Sex Pistols; The Clash; The Vibrators; The Saints; Dead Boys

Progressive Metal
Rush; Savatage; Queensrÿche; Fates Warning; Voivod; Dream Theater; Meshuggah; Porcupine Tree; Tool; The Dillinger Escape Plan; Opeth; Gojira; Mastodon; Coheed and Cambria

Power Metal
Scorpions; Accept; Manowar; Dio; Yngwie Malmsteen; Helloween; Blind Guardian; Stratovarius; Iced Earth; Kamelot; HammerFall; Rhapsody of Fire; Nightwish; Primal Fear; Sonata Arctica; DragonForce

New Wave of British Heavy Metal
Motörhead; Def Leppard; Quartz; Saxon; Iron Maiden; Tygers of Pan Tang; Diamond Head; Angel Witch; Girlschool; Raven; Fist; Holocaust; Tank

Hardcore
D.O.A.; Dead Kennedys; Discharge; Black Flag; Circle Jerks; The Exploited; Minor Threat; GBH; Misfits; Bad Brains; Agnostic Front

Doom Metal
Witchfinder General; Trouble; Candlemass; Solitude Aeturnus; Cathedral; Kyuss; My Dying Bride; Electric Wizard; Paradise Lost

Glam Metal
Quiet Riot; Mötley Crüe; Twisted Sister; Europe; Dokken; Ratt; Bon Jovi; Cinderella; Poison; Guns N' Roses; Winger; Warrant

Grunge
Green River; Screaming Trees; Melvins; Skin Yard; Soundgarden; Mudhoney; Tad; Nirvana; Alice in Chains; Mother Love Bone; Pearl Jam

Thrash Metal
Anvil; Metallica; Slayer; Anthrax; Megadeth; Pantera; Exodus; Overkill; Kreator; Destruction; Sodom; Sepultura; Testament; Death Angel

First Wave of Black Metal
Venom; Mercyful Fate; Bathory; Hellhammer; Celtic Frost

Industrial Metal
Ministry; White Zombie; Godflesh; Nine Inch Nails; Fear Factory; Genitorturers; Strapping Young Lad; Orgy; Static-X; Rammstein

Hard Alternative
Faith No More; Red Hot Chili Peppers; Jane's Addiction; Prong; Living Colour; The Smashing Pumpkins; Primus; Rage Against the Machine

Post-Grunge
Stone Temple Pilots; Candlebox; Bush; Silverchair; Nickelback; Creed; Godsmack

Metalcore
Corrosion of Conformity; Dirty Rotten Imbeciles; Suicidal Tendencies; Stormtroopers of Death; Cro-Mags; Biohazard; Machine Head; Earth Crisis; Hatebreed

Death Metal
Possessed; Death; Autopsy; Morbid Angel; Obituary; Cannibal Corpse; Deicide; Immolation; Vader; Six Feet Under; Kataklysm; Dying Fetus; Nile; Amon Amarth

Grindcore
Repulsion; Extreme Noise Terror; Napalm Death; Carcass; Bolt Thrower; Brutal Truth; Nasum; Cephalic Carnage; Agoraphobic Nosebleed; Pig Destroyer

Black Metal
Mayhem; Darkthrone; Marduk; Satyricon; Enslaved; Gorgoroth; Emperor; Dimmu Borgir; Cradle of Filth; Dark Funeral

Goth Metal
Tiamat; Type O Negative; Therion; The Gathering; Anathema; Katatonia; Theatre of Tragedy; Within Temptation; HIM; Lacuna Coil; Leaves' Eyes

Nu Metal
Korn; Deftones; Stuck Mojo; Limp Bizkit; Papa Roach; Coal Chamber; System of a Down; Kittie; Linkin Park; Disturbed

New Wave of American Metal
Shadows Fall; Lamb of God; God Forbid; Darkest Hour; Killswitch Engage; Unearth; Chimaira; The Black Dahlia Murder; As I Lay Dying; Trivium

Swedish Extreme Metal
Entombed; Grave; Unleashed; Dismember; At the Gates; Dark Tranquillity; In Flames; Arch Enemy; Soilwork; The Haunted
