= Metal: A Headbanger's Journey =

2005 film by Sam Dunn

- Original Theatrical poster
- Directed by: Jessica Joy Wise; Sam Dunn; Scot McFadyen
- Produced by: Sam Dunn; Scot McFadyen; Sam Feldman
- Starring: Sam Dunn
- Cinematography: Brendan Steacy
- Edited by: Mike Munn
- Production company: Banger Films
- Distributed by: Seville Pictures; Warner Home Video
- Release date: 2005
- Running time: 96 minutes
- Country: Canada
- Language: English

Metal: A Headbanger's Journey is a 2005 documentary film directed by Sam Dunn with Scot McFadyen and Jessica Wise. The film follows 31-year-old Dunn, a Canadian anthropologist, who has been a heavy metal fan since the age of 12. Dunn sets out across the world to uncover the various opinions on heavy metal music, including its origins, culture, controversy, and the reasons it is loved by so many people. The film made its debut at the 2005 Toronto International Film Festival, and was released as a two-disc special edition DVD in the US on 19 September 2006.

A follow-up to the film titled Global Metal premiered at the Bergen International Film Festival on 17 October 2007, and saw limited release in theatres in June 2008. Dunn has also elaborated upon his "Heavy Metal Family Tree" in the VH1 series Metal Evolution, which focuses on one subgenre per episode.

== Contents ==
The film discusses the traits and originators of some of metal's many subgenres, including the new wave of British heavy metal, power metal, nu metal, glam metal, thrash metal, black metal, and death metal. Dunn uses a family-tree-type flowchart to document some of the most popular metal subgenres. The film also explores various aspects of heavy metal culture. Notable segments include Dunn taking a trip to the Wacken Open Air festival, an interview with Dee Snider providing an analysis of the PMRC attack on heavy metal music, and an interview with several Norwegian black metal bands.

== Interviews ==
The most insightful information given in the film comes from candid interviews with popular artists from metal's past and present. Notable interviews come from:

Artist	Band	Birthplace
Angela Gossow	Arch Enemy	Cologne, Germany
Ann Boleyn	Hellion	Centralia, Washington
Tom Morello	Rage Against the Machine	New York City, New York
Ronnie James Dio	Dio, Black Sabbath, Rainbow	Portsmouth, New Hampshire
Tony Iommi	Black Sabbath	Aston, United Kingdom
Alice Cooper	Alice Cooper	Detroit, Michigan
George "Corpsegrinder" Fisher	Cannibal Corpse	Baltimore, Maryland
Alex Webster	Cannibal Corpse	Akron, New York
Ihsahn	Emperor	Notodden, Norway
Samoth	Emperor	Tromsø, Norway
Grutle Kjellson	Enslaved	Rogaland, Norway
Kim McAuliffe	Girlschool	London, United Kingdom
Jackie Chambers	Girlschool	Leeds, United Kingdom
Gaahl	Gorgoroth	Espedal, Norway
Jørn Inge Tunsberg	Hades Almighty	Norway
Bruce Dickinson	Iron Maiden	Worksop, United Kingdom
Mercedes Lander	Kittie	London, Ontario, Canada
Morgan Lander	Kittie	London, Ontario, Canada
James "Munky" Shaffer	Korn	Rosedale, California
Randy Blythe	Lamb of God	Richmond, Virginia
Mark Morton	Lamb of God	Richmond, Virginia
Blasphemer	Mayhem	Norway
Necrobutcher	Mayhem	Norway
Vince Neil	Mötley Crüe	Los Angeles, California
Lemmy	Motörhead	Stoke-on-Trent, United Kingdom
Geddy Lee	Rush	North York, Ontario, Canada
Tom Araya	Slayer	Viña del Mar, Chile
Kerry King	Slayer	Los Angeles, California
Joey Jordison	Slipknot / Murderdolls	Des Moines, Iowa
Corey Taylor	Slipknot / Stone Sour	Des Moines, Iowa
John Kay	Steppenwolf	Tilsit, Germany
Dee Snider	Twisted Sister	Massapequa, New York
Snake	Voivod	Jonquière, Quebec, Canada
Piggy	Voivod	Jonquière, Quebec, Canada
Doro Pesch	Warlock, Doro	Düsseldorf, Germany
Rob Zombie	White Zombie, Rob Zombie	Haverhill, Massachusetts

=== Non-musicians ===
- Bob Ezrin, record producer (Alice Cooper, Kiss, Pink Floyd)
- Deena Weinstein, sociologist
- Robert Walser, musicologist
- Malcolm Dome, journalist, writer, DJ
- Mike Guitor
- Sam Guitor, fan
- Joe Bottiglieri, fan
- Chuck Klosterman, writer
- Eric Bryan, fan, bass player (Bryan currently plays bass for Los Angeles thrash metal band, Anger as Art)
- Robert Kampf, founder of Century Media
- Joey Severance, tour manager
- Eddie Trunk, DJ
- Rob Jones, DJ
- Pamela Des Barres, groupie, writer, author of I'm With The Band
- Donna Gaines, sociologist
- Gavin Baddeley, writer
- Monte Conner, senior VP A&R – Roadrunner Records
- Rolf Rasmussen, assistant minister of the Åsane church
- Brian Slagel, owner/CEO of Metal Blade Records
- Rose Dyson, writer
- Keith Kahn-Harris, writer

== Soundtrack ==
- Accept – "Balls to the Wall"
- Arch Enemy – "Silent Wars" (live)
- Blue Cheer – "Summertime Blues"
- Burn to Black – "Winter Rancid Skies"
- Burn to Black – "Into Shadow"
- Burn to Black – "Microcosmic"
- Burn to Black – "Hellspell"
- Cannibal Corpse – "Decency Defied"
- Children of Bodom – "Needled 24/7"
- David MacDonaldson – "Partita In C Minor – Chorale"
- Diamond Head – "Am I Evil?"
- Dio – "Heaven and Hell" (live from A Special From The Spectrum)
- Emperor – "Inno a Satana"
- Enslaved – "Return to Yggdrasil"
- Enslaved – "Havenless"
- Girlschool – "C'Mon Let's Go"
- Iron Maiden – "Run to the Hills" (live from Rock in Rio)
- Iron Maiden – "The Number of the Beast"
- Lamb of God – "Laid to Rest"
- Metallica – "Master of Puppets"
- Metallica – "Fight Fire With Fire"
- Mötley Crüe – "Girls, Girls, Girls"
- Motörhead – "Ace of Spades"
- Motörhead – "Killed by Death"
- Rage Against the Machine – "Killing in the Name"
- Richard Wagner – "Faust Overture"
- Rush – "Working Man"
- Sepultura – "Arise"
- Sepultura – "Beneath the Remains"
- Slayer – "Disciple"
- Slipknot – "(Sic)" (live)
- Tim Renwick and Andy Caine – "Ain't Got a Pot To..."
- Twisted Sister – "We're Not Gonna Take It"
- Van Halen – "Eruption" (live)
- Venom – "Bloodlust"

== "Definitive metal family tree" ==
The chart from the film documents Dunn's view on the progression of subgenres of metal that have spawned over time as well as other styles of rock (i.e. hard rock, shock rock, punk rock, and hardcore) that have influence these styles of metal, while also attempting to list the prime examples of bands that fall into each category. Below is a typed version of that chart, which can be found on the second disc of the film's special edition DVD package. A new version was presented in the related TV series Metal Evolution which included a new "Pre-Metal" field that listed non-metal bands that had an influence on heavy metal and also listed additional bands as examples of the various subgenres.

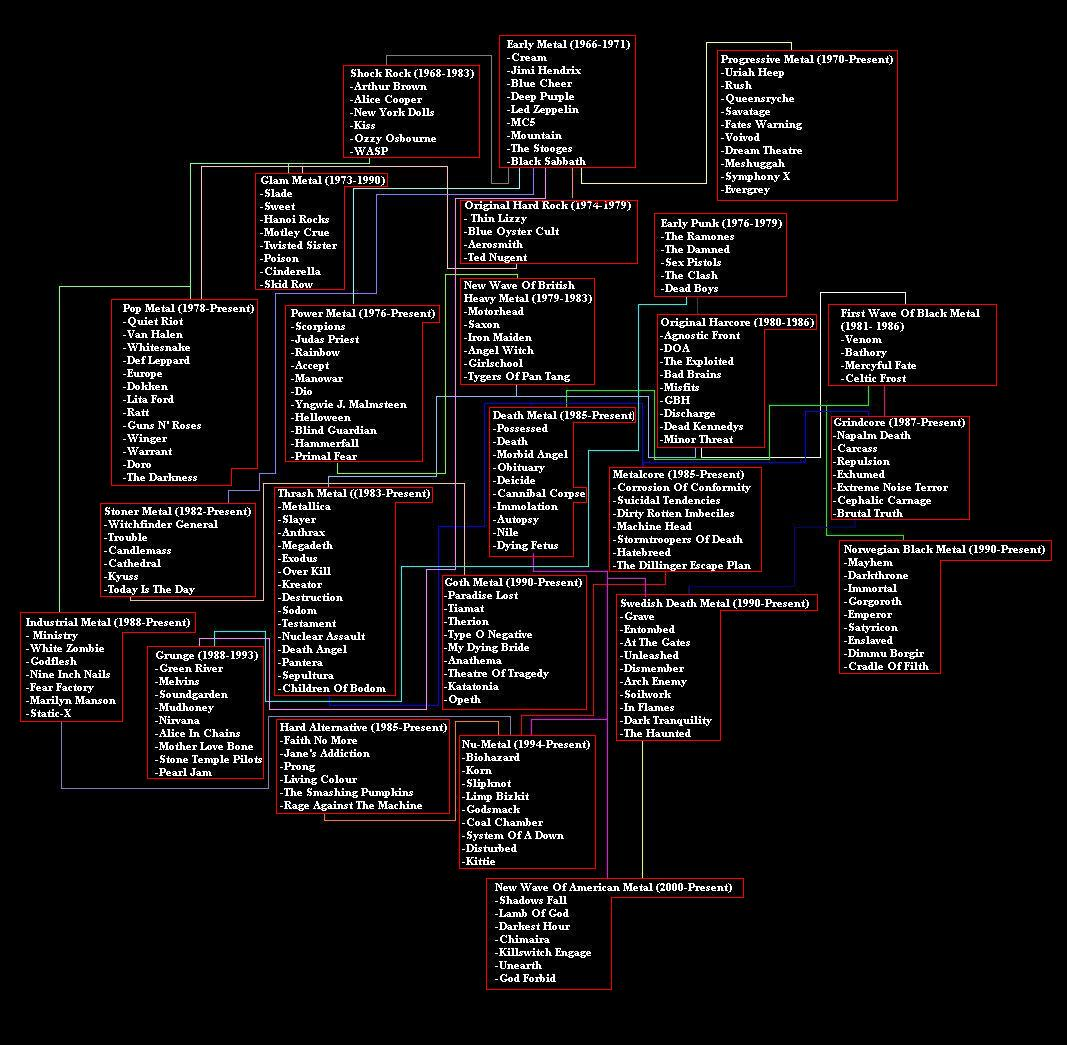
The film's flow chart of metal genres.

- Early Metal (1966–1971)

Cream; Jimi Hendrix; Blue Cheer; Deep Purple; Led Zeppelin; MC5; Mountain; The Stooges; Black Sabbath

- Shock Rock (1968–1983)

Arthur Brown; Alice Cooper; New York Dolls; Kiss; Ozzy Osbourne; W.A.S.P.

- Progressive Metal (1970–present)

Uriah Heep; Rush; Queensrÿche; Savatage; Fates Warning; Voivod; Dream Theater; Meshuggah; Symphony X; Evergrey

- Glam Metal (1973–1990)

Slade; Sweet; Hanoi Rocks; Mötley Crüe; Twisted Sister; Poison; Cinderella; Skid Row

- Original Hard Rock (1974–1979)

Thin Lizzy; Blue Öyster Cult; Aerosmith; AC/DC; Ted Nugent

- Early Punk (1976–1979)

The Ramones; The Damned; Sex Pistols; The Clash; The Dead Boys

- Power Metal (1976–present)

Scorpions; Judas Priest; Rainbow; Accept; Manowar; Dio; Yngwie J. Malmsteen; Helloween; Blind Guardian; HammerFall; Primal Fear

- Pop Metal (1978–present)

Quiet Riot; Van Halen; Whitesnake; Def Leppard; Europe; Dokken; Lita Ford; Ratt; Guns N' Roses; Winger; Warrant; Doro; The Darkness

- New wave of British heavy metal (1979–1983)

Motörhead; Saxon; Iron Maiden; Angel Witch; Girlschool; Tygers of Pan Tang; Diamond Head

- Original Hardcore (1980–1986)

Agnostic Front; D.O.A.; The Exploited; Bad Brains; Misfits; GBH; Discharge; Dead Kennedys; Minor Threat; Black Flag

- First wave of black metal (1981–1986)

Venom; Bathory; Mercyful Fate; Celtic Frost

- Doom Metal (1982–present)

Witchfinder General; Trouble; Candlemass; Cathedral; Kyuss; Today Is The Day

- Thrash Metal (1983–present)

Metallica; Slayer; Anthrax; Megadeth; Exodus; Overkill; Kreator; Destruction; Sodom; Testament; Nuclear Assault; Death Angel; Pantera; Sepultura; Children of Bodom

- Death Metal (1985–present)

Possessed; Death; Morbid Angel; Obituary; Deicide; Cannibal Corpse; Immolation; Autopsy; Nile; Dying Fetus

- Metalcore (1985–present)

Corrosion of Conformity; Suicidal Tendencies; Dirty Rotten Imbeciles; Machine Head; Stormtroopers of Death; Hatebreed; The Dillinger Escape Plan

- Hard Alternative (1985–present)

Faith No More; Jane's Addiction; Prong; Living Colour; The Smashing Pumpkins; Rage Against the Machine; Tool

- Grindcore (1987–present)

Napalm Death; Carcass; Repulsion; Exhumed; Extreme Noise Terror; Cephalic Carnage; Brutal Truth

- Industrial Metal (1988–present)

Ministry; White Zombie; Godflesh; Nine Inch Nails; Fear Factory; Marilyn Manson; Static-X

- Grunge (1988–1994)

Green River; The Melvins; Soundgarden; Mudhoney; Nirvana; Alice in Chains; Mother Love Bone; Stone Temple Pilots; Pearl Jam

- Norwegian black metal (1990–present)

Mayhem; Darkthrone; Immortal; Gorgoroth; Emperor; Satyricon; Enslaved; Dimmu Borgir; Cradle of Filth

- Swedish Death Metal (1990–present)

Grave; Entombed; At the Gates; Unleashed; Dismember; Arch Enemy; Soilwork; In Flames; Dark Tranquillity; The Haunted

- Goth Metal (aka Doom Metal on the DVD) (1990–present)

Paradise Lost; Tiamat; Therion; Type O Negative; My Dying Bride; Anathema; Theatre of Tragedy; Katatonia; Opeth

- Nu Metal (1994–2003)

Biohazard; KoЯn; Limp Bizkit; Slipknot; Godsmack; Coal Chamber; System of a Down; Disturbed; Kittie

- New wave of American metal (2000–present)

Shadows Fall; Lamb of God; Darkest Hour; Chimaira; Killswitch Engage; Unearth; God Forbid

== Reception ==
The film received mostly positive reviews. It currently holds a 90% approval rating on Rotten Tomatoes, with an average rating of 6.9/10 and the critical consensus being: "Made by a metalhead, this documentary of the musical genre both informs and entertains with its range of interviewees."

Some brief controversy arose over the film's depiction of black metal, which many fans of the genre saw as being one-sided and biased during a screening documented in the film. In the special features to the DVD of the film, Dunn attempted a restitution to the concerns of the black metal fans by including an additional featurette.

== See also ==
- Until the Light Takes Us, a documentary film about early Norwegian black metal.
