= Rush: Beyond the Lighted Stage =

- Theatrical release poster
- Directed by: Sam Dunn; Scot McFadyen
- Produced by: Sam Dunn; Scot McFadyen
- Starring: Rush
- Cinematography: Martin Hawkes
- Edited by: Mike Munn
- Music by: Rush
- Production company: Banger Films
- Distributed by: D&E Entertainment; Alliance Films
- Release date: June 10, 2010
- Running time: 107 minutes
- Country: Canada
- Language: English

Rush: Beyond the Lighted Stage is a 2010 documentary film directed by Scot McFadyen and Sam Dunn. The film offers an in-depth look at the Canadian hard rock band Rush, chronicling the band's history and musical evolution. The film made its debut at the 2010 Tribeca Film Festival, where it earned the 2010 Audience Award. The film was also nominated for Best Long Form Music Video at 53rd Grammy Awards, losing to When You're Strange, a documentary about The Doors. A limited theatrical run began on June 10, 2010 and the film was released on DVD and Blu-ray in the US and Canada on June 29 of that year. John Rutsey, the band's original drummer, died in 2008; tape-recorded comments from him are incorporated into the film.

== Interviews ==
Individuals are listed in alphabetical order.

Musicians

Celebrity	Band
Sebastian Bach	Skid Row
Jack Black	Tenacious D
Mick Box	Uriah Heep
Danny Carey	Tool
Jimmy Chamberlin	The Smashing Pumpkins
Les Claypool	Primus
Tim Commerford	Rage Against the Machine
Billy Corgan	The Smashing Pumpkins
Freddie Gruber	Freddie Gruber
Kirk Hammett	Metallica
Taylor Hawkins	Foo Fighters
Jason McGerr	Death Cab for Cutie
Kim Mitchell	Max Webster
Vinnie Paul	Pantera
Mike Portnoy	Dream Theater
Trent Reznor	Nine Inch Nails
Gene Simmons	Kiss
Matt Stone	DVDA
Zakk Wylde	Black Label Society

Non-musicians

Name	Description
Liam Birt	Tour manager
Terry Brown	Rush's producer, 1975–1982
Cliff Burnstein	Q Prime Management
Frank Ciampa	Fan
John Baicich	Fan
Peter Collins	Rush's producer, 1985–1987, 1993–1996
Ray Danniels	Band manager
Donna Halper	Media historian, former music director for WMMS
Rupert Hine	Rush's producer, 1989–1991
Kelly Paris	Fan
Glen and Betty Peart	Neil Peart's parents
Nick Raskulinecz	Rush's producer, 2006–2012
John Roberts	Fox News Channel anchor, former MuchMusic video jockey
Christopher Schneberger	Fan
Kevin Shirley	Engineer, 1993
Howard Ungerleider	Tour lighting designer
Mary Weinrib	Geddy Lee's mother
Vic Wilson	Former band manager
Melanija Zivojinovich	Alex Lifeson's mother

== Release ==
Rush: Beyond the Lighted Stage premiered on VH1 on June 26, 2010.

=== DVD ===
The DVD issue consists of two discs, with the film on one and a collection of deleted/extended scenes and live performances on the other.

==== Deleted/extended scenes ====
- Being Bullied and The Search for the First Gig
- Reflections on the album Hemispheres
- Presto and "Roll the Bones" Rap
- The Rush Fashion
- Hobbies on the Road
- Rush Trekkies
- Pre-Gig Warm-Up - An extended version of the backstage footage shown at the start of the film
- Dinner with Rush at a Hunting Lodge - An extended version of the footage shown during the film's closing credits

==== Live performances ====
- "Best I Can" - Live at Laura Secord High School, St. Catharines, Ontario, 1974 (with original drummer John Rutsey; part of Rush's appearance on the TV series Canadian Bandstand)
- "Working Man" - Same performance as above, also with Rutsey
- "La Villa Strangiato" - Live at the 1979 Pinkpop Festival in the Netherlands (first time this song was captured on video; recording begins at the start of the "A Lerxst in Wonderland" section, after comments by the band about Alex Lifeson's injured finger)
- "Between Sun and Moon" - Opening night of the 2002 Vapor Trails Tour, Hartford, CT (first live show following the band's hiatus)
- "Far Cry" - Live in Rotterdam, 2007 (from the Snakes & Arrows Live DVD)
- "Entre Nous" – Live in Rotterdam, 2007 (from the Snakes & Arrows Live DVD)
- "Bravado" - Live in Frankfurt, 2004 (previously only available on the R30 Blu-ray version)
- "YYZ" - Live in Frankfurt, 2004 (previously only available on the R30 Blu-ray version)

Combined, the two discs include over three hours of content.

== Reception ==
The film received mostly positive reviews from critics. On the review aggregator website Rotten Tomatoes, 90% of 10 critics' reviews are positive, with an average rating of 7.6/10.
