= Test for Echo Tour =

1996–1997 concert tour by Rush

- Tour by Rush
- Location: North America
- Associated album: Test for Echo
- Start date: October 19, 1996
- End date: July 4, 1997
- Legs: 2
- No. of shows: 68

Rush concert chronology
- Counterparts Tour (1994); Test for Echo Tour (1996–1997); Vapor Trails Tour (2002)

The Test for Echo Tour was a concert tour by Canadian rock band Rush in support of their sixteenth studio album Test for Echo.

== Background ==
It was the band's first tour with no opening act, and was billed as "An Evening With Rush". The tour kicked off on October 19, 1996, at the Knickerbocker Arena in Albany, New York and culminated on July 4, 1997, at the Corel Centre in Ottawa, Ontario. This was the only concert tour until 2026 in which Rush played the song "2112" in its entirety. During the tour, the band had included live camera footage, video, lasers and strobes as part of their sets. This marked the last tour until 2002 because of tragedies in Neil Peart's life. Recordings from the tour were released on the 1998 live album Different Stages.

== Reception ==
On the opening night of the tour in Albany's Knickerbocker Arena, Michael Lisi from The Sunday Gazette wrote that the band had shown that practice makes perfect, when the band performed with a visual and aural attack which kept the audience on its feet and screaming the whole show, with other fans waving their hands during the performance of "2112" in its entirety, noting on the words of a fan after the band left the stage that it was "unbelievable". Lisi continued on the mix of old and new songs which he stated was superb, noting the new songs as "right on the mark". He stated that the band were able to breathe life into "Closer to the Heart" which was noted as a "powerful read". Commenting on the band, Lisi stated that they looked like they were having a blast, were right on the money when commenting positively on Lee's vocals being in perfect form, and that they sounded better than ever.

Reviewing the Civic Arena performance in Pittsburgh on November 3, 1996, Kathy Sabol from the Observer-Reporter, stated that she had enjoyed the concert, noting on the melodic songs along the video backdrop in which she appreciated drummer Neil Peart's statements on greed, ambition, death and despair. Regarding the change in the band's sound, she said that it was no accident that it came from Rush's efforts in the last five years when the band evolved to a richer, clarified sound of its own. Other than taking note on how "2112" performed in its entirety is a big deal, she stated that the sampling, and multi-layering of the guitar and drum work is a credit to the band's history with how they manage.

The Deseret News's Scott Iwasald, reviewing the May 20, 1997 show at Salt Lake City's Delta Center, mentioned that the band did not need elaborate stage props, stage sets or costumes unlike modern bands those days, in which the music spoke for itself. He wrote that the band were as hot as ever, playing well, tight and looked like they were having fun on stage - working together to put on a terrific live show. He noted when the video backdrop was not working during the first half of the evening, but said the band did not need it, as he stated before that the music spoke for itself. Regarding the audience, he wrote that the instrumental "Limbo" and the power chorus of "Force Ten" brought them to their feet, later concluding that the band held them in their palm, and when the show ended, none of the audience were disappointed.

== Set list ==
This is an example set list adapted from Rush: Wandering the Face of the Earth – The Official Touring History of what were performed during the tour, but may not represent the majority of the shows.

Set 1

1. "Dreamline"
2. "Limelight"
3. "Stick It Out"
4. "The Big Money" (with "Wipeout" outro)
5. "Driven"
6. "Half the World"
7. "Red Barchetta"
8. "Animate"
9. "Limbo"
10. "The Trees"
11. "Red Sector A"
12. "Virtuality"
13. "Nobody's Hero"
14. "Closer to the Heart"
15. "2112" (all chapters)

Set 2

16. "Test for Echo"
17. "Subdivisions"
18. "Freewill"
19. "Roll the Bones"
20. "Resist"
21. "Leave That Thing Alone"
22. "The Rhythm Method" (drum solo)
23. "Natural Science"
24. "Force Ten"
25. "Time and Motion"
26. "The Spirit of Radio"
27. "Tom Sawyer"
  Encore
28. "YYZ"
29. "Cygnus X-1" (teaser)

== Tour dates ==
List of 1996 concerts
Date	City	Country	Venue	Attendance	Gross
October 19, 1996	Albany	United States	Knickerbocker Arena	9,727 / 9,727	$297,458
October 20, 1996	Buffalo	United States	Marine Midland Arena	8,898 / 8,898	$259,889
October 22, 1996	Fairborn	United States	Nutter Center	7,835 / 9,000	$237,802
October 23, 1996	Grand Rapids	United States	Van Andel Arena	6,537 / 10,000	$213,138
October 25, 1996	Auburn Hills	United States	The Palace of Auburn Hills	14,673 / 14,673	$467,308
October 26, 1996	Rockford	United States	Rockford MetroCentre	4,933 / 8,614	$135,675
October 28, 1996	Chicago	United States	United Center	13,400 / 16,595	$466,705
October 29, 1996	Minneapolis	United States	Target Center	7,753 / 11,000	$256,315
October 31, 1996	St. Louis	United States	Kiel Center	10,157 / 13,500	$313,705
November 1, 1996	Milwaukee	United States	Bradley Center	9,730 / 12,777	$298,266
November 3, 1996	Pittsburgh	United States	Civic Arena	9,255 / 12,000	$284,692
November 4, 1996	Cleveland	United States	Gund Arena	10,743 / 12,000	$339,855
November 6, 1996	Philadelphia	United States	CoreStates Center	14,759 / 15,147	$444,804
November 7, 1996	Landover	United States	USAir Arena	11,077 / 13,000	$326,366
November 9, 1996	Boston	United States	FleetCenter	14,003 / 19,580	$403,255
November 10, 1996	Hartford	United States	Hartford Civic Center	9,642 / 10,500	$276,260
November 20, 1996	San Jose	United States	San Jose Arena	10,851 / 12,500	$340,720
November 21, 1996	Sacramento	United States	ARCO Arena	6,984 / 12,550	$235,455
November 23, 1996	San Diego	United States	San Diego Sports Arena	8,532 / 11,084	$211,251
November 24, 1996	Paradise	United States	Thomas & Mack Center	7,373 / 9,000	$199,618
November 26, 1996	Inglewood	United States	Great Western Forum	19,319 / 25,000	$596,855
November 27, 1996	Inglewood	United States	Great Western Forum	19,319 / 25,000	$596,855
November 29, 1996	Phoenix	United States	America West Arena	10,858 / 12,000	$320,540
November 30, 1996	El Paso	United States	Special Events Center	5,295 / 8,000	$155,835
December 2, 1996	San Antonio	United States	Alamodome	10,014 / 15,000	-
December 3, 1996	Dallas	United States	Reunion Arena	-	-
December 5, 1996	Houston	United States	The Summit	10,413 / 17,050	-
December 6, 1996	New Orleans	United States	UNO Lakefront Arena	7,019 / 7,019	$216,070
December 8, 1996	West Palm Beach	United States	Coral Sky Amphitheater	13,297 / 18,840	$266,803
December 9, 1996	Tampa	United States	Ice Palace	7,691 / 9,500	$237,190
December 11, 1996	Atlanta	United States	The Omni	10,143 / 11,000	$301,475
December 12, 1996	Charlotte	United States	Charlotte Coliseum	7,258 / 10,000	-
December 14, 1996	Uniondale	United States	Nassau Coliseum	12,222 / 12,500	$371,712
December 15, 1996	East Rutherford	United States	Continental Airlines Arena	15,621 / 15,621	$453,538
December 18, 1996	Toronto	Canada	Phoenix Concert Theatre	900 / 900	-

List of 1997 concerts
Date	City	Country	Venue	Attendance	Gross
May 7, 1997	San Diego	United States	Hospitality Point	5,119 / 5,119	$190,810
May 8, 1997	Phoenix	United States	Desert Sky Pavilion	9,856 / 20,144	$267,785
May 10, 1997	Devore	United States	Glen Helen Blockbuster Pavilion	18,040 / 18,040	-
May 11, 1997	Mountain View	United States	Shoreline Amphitheatre	10,099 / 20,000	$298,449
May 14, 1997	Portland	United States	Rose Garden Arena	8,243 / 10,412	-
May 16, 1997	Vancouver	Canada	General Motors Place	5,497 / 13,340	$214,114
May 17, 1997	George	United States	The Gorge Amphitheatre	19,968 / 20,000	$519,100
May 19, 1997	Boise	United States	BSU Pavilion	5,535 / 8,500	-
May 20, 1997	Salt Lake City	United States	Delta Center	10,837 / 11,512	-
May 22, 1997	Greenwood Village	United States	Fiddler's Green Amphitheater	11,156 / 17,416	$257,616
May 24, 1997	Dallas	United States	Starplex Amphitheater	9,414 / 20,111	$234,936
May 25, 1997	The Woodlands	United States	Cynthia Woods Mitchell Pavilion	13,024 / 13,024	$382,245
June 4, 1997	Cincinnati	United States	Riverbend Music Center	8,538 / 14,175	-
June 5, 1997	Nashville	United States	Starwood Amphitheatre	9,712 / 17,200	$150,472
June 7, 1997	Bonner Springs	United States	Sandstone Amphitheater	9,511 / 13,500	-
June 8, 1997	Maryland Heights	United States	Riverport Amphitheater	8,647 / 15,700	-
June 10, 1997	Noblesville	United States	Deer Creek Music Center	9,617 / 20,085	$226,694
June 11, 1997	Burgettstown	United States	Star Lake Amphitheater	11,088 / 22,561	$188,770
June 13, 1997	Milwaukee	United States	Marcus Amphitheater	6,919 / 15,894	-
June 14, 1997	Tinley Park	United States	New World Music Theater	11,481 / 15,000	$373,655
June 16, 1997	Columbus	United States	Polaris Amphitheater	9,889 / 13,677	$220,769
June 17, 1997	Clarkston	United States	Pine Knob Music Theater	13,409 / 14,500	$348,742
June 19, 1997	Holmdel	United States	PNC Bank Arts Center	9,371 / 10,802	$318,995
June 20, 1997	Bristow	United States	Nissan Pavilion	10,929 / 14,776	$282,954
June 22, 1997	Camden	United States	Blockbuster-Sony E-Centre	10,566 / 25,000	$273,543
June 23, 1997	Mansfield	United States	Great Woods Performing Arts Center	9,884 / 15,000	-
June 25, 1997	Wantagh	United States	Jones Beach Amphitheater	10,541 / 10,541	$399,995
June 26, 1997	Corfu	United States	Darien Lake Performing Arts Center	7,165 / 8,500	$178,325
June 28, 1997	Montreal	Canada	Molson Centre	12,521 / 13,942	$470,240
June 30, 1997	Toronto	Canada	Molson Amphitheatre	16,000 / 16,000	$649,593
July 2, 1997	Toronto	Canada	Molson Amphitheatre	-	$649,593
July 3, 1997	Quebec City	Canada	Quebec Coliseum	6,759 / 9,770	$247,010
July 4, 1997	Ottawa	Canada	Corel Centre	6,390 / 11,000	$236,475

=== Box office score data ===
List of box office score data with date, city, venue, attendance, gross, references
Date	City	Venue	Attendance	Gross	Ref(s)
October 25, 1996	Auburn Hills, United States	Palace	15,197 / 15,197	$467,308	
November 6, 1996	Philadelphia, United States	CoreStates Center	14,759 / 15,147	$444,805	
November 10, 1996	Hartford, United States	Civic Center	9,642 / 10,500	$276,260	
November 26–27, 1996	Inglewood, United States	Great Western Forum	19,319 / 25,000	$596,855	
November 29, 1996	Phoenix, United States	America West Arena	10,858 / 12,000	$320,540	
May 8, 1997	Phoenix, United States	Blockbuster Desert Sky Pavilion	9,856 / 20,144	$267,785	
May 25, 1997	The Woodlands, United States	Cynthia Woods Mitchell Pavilion	13,024 / 13,024	$382,245	
June 17, 1997	Clarkston, United States	Pine Knob Music Theatre	13,409 / 14,500	$348,743	

== Personnel ==
- Geddy Lee – vocals, bass, keyboards
- Alex Lifeson – guitar, backing vocals
- Neil Peart – drums
