= Different Stages (Rush album) =

Live album by Rush
- Released: November 10, 1998
- Recorded: 1978, 1994, and 1997
- Genres: Hard rock; progressive rock
- Length: 202:44
- Label: Anthem
- Producers: Geddy Lee and Paul Northfield

Rush chronology
Retrospective II (1997)	Different Stages (1998)	Vapor Trails (2002)

Professional ratings
Review scores
Source	Rating
AllMusic	3/5 stars
The Encyclopedia of Popular Music	3/5 stars
Entertainment Weekly	C+
The Essential Rock Discography	5/10
MusicHound Rock	3.5/5 stars
The Rolling Stone Album Guide	3/5 stars
SoundStage!	2/5 stars
The Virgin Encyclopedia of 80s Music	3/5 stars
The Collector's Guide To Heavy Metal	8/10

Different Stages is a live album by Canadian rock band Rush, released in 1998. The bulk of the first and second discs were recorded at the World Music Theatre in Tinley Park, Illinois, during the 1997 Test for Echo tour. Five other songs from various stops along the tour were included, as well as three songs from the 1994 Counterparts tour. The third disc is taken from a performance at the Hammersmith Odeon in London during the A Farewell to Kings tour in 1978.

The album was compiled and released by lead singer and bassist Geddy Lee and producer Paul Northfield. The album is dedicated to the memory of drummer Neil Peart's daughter Selena, who died in a car accident in 1997, and his wife Jacqueline, who died of cancer 10 months later. The text "Suddenly...You were gone...from all the lives you left your mark upon. In loving memory of Jackie and Selena", is included in the album's packaging. The first 13 words are a line from the song "Afterimage", from Rush's 1984 album Grace Under Pressure.

Production took place as Peart was recovering from his losses and consequently he was not involved in the project. As chronicled in his book Ghost Rider: Travels on the Healing Road, Peart had told his bandmates that they should "consider [him] retired", leaving Lee and guitarist Alex Lifeson facing the possibility that the album would be Rush's last.

The Japanese release of Different Stages includes "Force Ten" as a bonus track, and the lyrics for all songs on the album. The initial first pressings contained miniature replica tour booklets from the A Farewell to Kings and Test for Echo tours.

The concert featured on the third disc was released in 2017 in its complete form on the 40th-anniversary edition of A Farewell to Kings.

== Track listing ==
All songs written by Alex Lifeson, Geddy Lee and Neil Peart except where noted.

=== Disc 1 ===
All songs recorded on June 14, 1997, at the World Music Theatre in Tinley Park, Illinois, except where noted.

1. "Dreamline" – 5:34
2. "Limelight" – 4:32
3. "Driven" – 5:16
4. "Bravado" (recorded on April 30, 1994, at the Spectrum in Philadelphia) – 6:23
5. "Animate" – 6:29
6. "Show Don't Tell" (recorded on February 27, 1994, at the Miami Arena) – 5:29
7. "The Trees" (recorded on May 24, 1997, at the Coca-Cola Starplex Amphitheatre in Dallas) – 5:28
8. "Nobody's Hero" – 5:01
9. "Closer to the Heart" (Lifeson, Lee, Peart, Peter Talbot) – 5:13
10. "2112: Overture" – 4:35
11. "2112: The Temples of Syrinx" – 2:22
12. "2112: Discovery" – 4:19
13. "2112: Presentation" – 3:42
14. "2112: Oracle: The Dream" – 1:51
15. "2112: Soliloquy" – 2:10
16. "2112: Grand Finale" (Instrumental) – 2:37

"2112" was recorded on June 23, 1997, at the Great Woods Center for the Performing Arts in Mansfield, Massachusetts. Different Stages is the only Rush live album that contains a full performance of the entire "2112" suite.

=== Disc 2 ===
All songs recorded on June 14, 1997, at the World Music Theatre except where noted.

1. "Test for Echo" (Lifeson, Lee, Peart, Pye Dubois) – 6:15
2. "The Analog Kid" (recorded on March 22, 1994, at The Palace of Auburn Hills in Auburn Hills, Michigan) – 5:14
3. "Freewill" – 5:36
4. "Roll the Bones" – 5:58
5. "Stick It Out" – 4:42
6. "Resist" (recorded on July 2, 1997, at the Molson Canadian Amphitheatre in Toronto) – 4:27
7. "Leave That Thing Alone" (Instrumental) (Lifeson, Lee) (recorded on June 23, 1997, at Great Woods Center for the Performing Arts in Mansfield, Massachusetts) – 4:46
8. "The Rhythm Method (Instrumental) – 1997" (Peart) – 8:19
9. "Natural Science" – 8:05
  I. "Tide Pools" – 2:33
  II. "Hyperspace" – 2:45
  III. "Permanent Waves" - 2:47
10. "Force Ten" (Lifeson, Lee, Peart, Pye Dubois) (recorded June 4, 1997, at Riverbend Music Center in Cincinnati) – 4:54 (Japanese release only)
11. "The Spirit of Radio" – 4:47
12. "Tom Sawyer" (Lifeson, Lee, Peart, Pye Dubois) – 5:18
13. "YYZ" (Lee, Peart) (Instrumental) – 5:25

=== Disc 3 ===
Recorded on February 20, 1978, in London at the Hammersmith Odeon.

1. "Bastille Day" – 5:07
2. "By-Tor & the Snow Dog" – 4:59
  I. "At the Tobes of Hades" – 0:37
  II. "Across the Styx" - 0:38
  III. "Of the Battle" - 3:45
  i. "Challenge and Defiance" - 2:49
  ii. "7/4 War Furor" - 0:56
3. "Xanadu" – 12:32
4. "A Farewell to Kings" – 5:53
5. "Something for Nothing" (Lee, Peart) – 4:01
6. "Cygnus X-1" – 10:23
  "Prologue" - 5:03
  "1" - 0:46
  "2" - 1:34
  "3" - 3:01
7. "Anthem" – 4:47
8. "Working Man" (Lifeson, Lee) – 4:00
9. "Fly by Night" (Lee, Peart) – 2:04
10. "In the Mood" (Lee) – 3:34
11. "Cinderella Man" (Lee, Lifeson) – 5:09

Track 2 segues directly into track 3, and tracks 8 through 10 are performed as a medley.

== Personnel ==
Rush

- Geddy Lee – bass guitar, synthesizers, vocals
- Alex Lifeson – electric and acoustic guitars, synthesizers, backing vocals
- Neil Peart – drums, percussion

Production

- Geddy Lee – production
- Paul Northfield – production, mixing
- Robert Scovill – recording engineer (1997)
- Terry Brown – recording engineer (1978)
- Andrew MacNaughtan, Dimo Safari, Tony Frederick, Fin Costello – photography
- Hugh Syme – art direction, illustrations, design
- Anthem Entertainment (Liam Birt and Pegi Cecconi) – executive production

== Charts ==
Chart (1998)	Peak position
Canadian Albums (Billboard)	12
US Billboard 200	35

== Certifications ==
Region	Certification	Certified units/sales
Canada (Music Canada)	Platinum	100,000^{^}
United States (RIAA)	Gold	500,000^{^}
^{^} Shipments figures based on certification alone.
