= Counterparts Tour =

1994 concert tour by Rush

- Tour by Rush
- Location: North America
- Associated album: Counterparts
- Start date: January 22, 1994
- End date: May 7, 1994
- No. of shows: 54

Rush concert chronology
- Roll the Bones Tour (1991–1992); Counterparts Tour (1994); Test for Echo Tour (1996–1997)

The Counterparts Tour was a concert tour by Canadian rock band Rush in support of their fifteenth studio album, Counterparts, and marked the members' 20th anniversary as a band.

== Background ==
The tour kicked off January 22, 1994 at the Civic Center in Pensacola, Florida and culminated on May 7, 1994 at Maple Leaf Gardens in Toronto, estimated to have performed to 589,137 fans. Some recordings from the tour were featured on the 1998 live album Different Stages.

This was the band's last tour to have any opening acts. These opening acts were Candlebox, The Melvins, Primus, The Doughboys, and I Mother Earth.

== Reception ==
The New York Times's John Pareles, reviewing one of the two Madison Square Garden shows in March, opened that the band performed for two hours amid film clips and special effects such as smoke, psychedelic patterned lights, and spark showers. He continued, stating that Rush flaunted music proficiency with "speeding guitar scales, hard-hitting drumming and earnest vocals" to "melodic hooks of pop tunes" similar to The Police. Noting on the audience, Pareles acknowledged that the band counted on many fans during the show to sing along to every song performed. The only criticism Pareles gave was the change in sound in songs when Lifeson went from acoustic to electric, proceeding the music at one "unvarying" volume, also noting that Rush lacked a rudimentary sense of dynamics.

Reviewing the May 3, 1994 performance at Albany's Knickerbocker Arena, Michael Hochanadel from The Sunday Gazette, praised the band's sound, stating that it sounded like it had settled into a sound similar to Pink Floyd and The Police and had become a genre themselves "through sheer sound and style", adding that the special effects and fireworks have elevated the band's music. Commenting on the interaction with Rush and their fans, Hochanadel noted when Lee had advanced closer towards the audience during the song "Closer to the Heart", stating that he matched movement to words as well as adding that Peart's drum solo had a tip-off when his drum riser was used.

Despite the positive reception from many critics and audiences, Ed Masley from the Pittsburgh Post-Gazette who attended the April 20, 1994 performance in Pittsburgh, had opened that Rush did not know how to put on a 'real' rock show, stating that Peart did not know anything about that - calling him a "drag". He noted on the special effects the band used in their performance, stating that the band were still boring, noting on how the images on the screen behind the band had drawn more applause than the musicians performing.

Kelley Crowley from the Observer-Reporter, whom also criticized the band's performance in a negative light claimed that Geddy Lee's vocals were possessed by the spirit of a mouse and in an "electronic frenzy", also criticizing the "muddy and distorted" sound the band had presented, and the mistakes Lifeson was making on his guitar solo in "The Spirit of Radio". Crowley also acknowledged the complaints of fans on their expectations of hearing the old material at the show. However though, Crowley stated that with the use of the video screen, special effects and lights, it was described as a "sensory experience".

== Set list ==
This is an example set list adapted from Rush: Wandering the Face of the Earth – The Official Touring History of what were performed during the tour, but may not represent the majority of the shows. The Counterparts Tour was also the first and only Rush tour to not feature any portion(s) of 2112 in the set list since the song's release.

1. "Dreamline"
2. "The Spirit of Radio"
3. "The Analog Kid"
4. "Cold Fire"
5. "Time Stand Still"
6. "Nobody's Hero"
7. "Roll the Bones"
8. "Animate"
9. "Stick It Out"
10. "Double Agent"
11. "Limelight"
12. "Bravado"
13. "Mystic Rhythms"
14. "Closer to the Heart"
15. "Show Don't Tell"
16. "Leave That Thing Alone"
17. "The Rhythm Method" (drum solo)
18. "The Trees"
19. "Xanadu"
20. "Cygnus X-1 Book II: Hemispheres – Prelude"
21. "Tom Sawyer"
  Encore
22. "Force Ten"
23. "YYZ"
24. "Cygnus X-1 Book I: The Voyage" (teaser)

== Tour dates ==
List of 1994 concerts
Date	City	Country	Venue	Opening Act(s)	Attendance	Gross
January 22, 1994	Pensacola	United States	Pensacola Civic Center	Candlebox	8,422 / 8,422	$176,550
January 23, 1994	New Orleans	United States	Lakefront Arena	Candlebox	7,432 / 7,432	$180,302
January 25, 1994	Austin	United States	Frank Erwin Center	Candlebox	8,338 / 11,781	$208,414
January 26, 1994	Houston	United States	The Summit	Candlebox	12,529 / 17,055	$321,661
January 28, 1994	Dallas	United States	Reunion Arena	Candlebox	14,619 / 14,619	$400,920
January 29, 1994	San Antonio	United States	HemisFair Arena	Candlebox	11,210 / 12,273	$256,822
January 31, 1994	Las Cruces	United States	Pan American Center	Candlebox	8,387 / 9,500	$176,800
February 1, 1994	Phoenix	United States	Veterans Memorial Coliseum	Candlebox	13,970 / 13,970	$328,026
February 3, 1994	Inglewood	United States	Great Western Forum	Candlebox	13,755 / 13,755	$313,826
February 5, 1994	Anaheim	United States	Arrowhead Pond of Anaheim	Candlebox	13,460 / 13,460	$333,646
February 7, 1994	San Diego	United States	San Diego Sports Arena	Candlebox	11,242 / 11,668	$226,598
February 8, 1994	Fresno	United States	Selland Arena	Melvins	6,249 / 9,011	$127,647
February 10, 1994	Sacramento	United States	ARCO Arena	Melvins	9,799 / 12,000	-
February 11, 1994	Daly City	United States	Cow Palace	Melvins	9,214 / 12,000	-
February 12, 1994	San Jose	United States	San Jose Arena	Melvins	13,274 / 15,000	-
February 23, 1994	Murfreesboro	United States	Murphy Center	Candlebox	6,632 / 8,500	$149,442
February 24, 1994	Atlanta	United States	Omni Coliseum	Candlebox	11,495 / 12,500	$281,906
February 25, 1994	Charlotte	United States	Charlotte Coliseum	Candlebox	9,675 / 14,000	$217,688
February 27, 1994	Miami	United States	Miami Arena	Candlebox	10,696 / 13,000	-
March 1, 1994	Orlando	United States	Amway Arena	Candlebox	9,644 / 10,000	$237,542
March 2, 1994	Jacksonville	United States	Jacksonville Coliseum	Candlebox	4,752 / 9,000	-
March 4, 1994	St. Petersburg	United States	Thunderdome	Candlebox	8,377 / 15,000	-
March 6, 1994	Chapel Hill	United States	Dean Smith Center	Candlebox	7,318 / 8,000	$164,665
March 8, 1994	New York City	United States	Madison Square Garden	Candlebox	28,832 / 28,832	$839,494
March 9, 1994	New York City	United States	Madison Square Garden	Candlebox	28,832 / 28,832	$839,494
March 11, 1994	Worcester	United States	Worcester Centrum	Candlebox	22,127 / 25,008	$535,570
March 12, 1994	Worcester	United States	Worcester Centrum	Candlebox	22,127 / 25,008	$535,570
March 22, 1994	Auburn Hills	United States	The Palace of Auburn Hills	Primus	14,848 / 14,848	$367,117
March 23, 1994	Richfield	United States	Richfield Coliseum	Primus	14,717 / 14,717	$360,270
March 25, 1994	Cincinnati	United States	Riverfront Coliseum	Primus	10,687 / 10,687	$256,375
March 26, 1994	Indianapolis	United States	Market Square Arena	Primus	12,035 / 14,000	$286,282
March 27, 1994	Auburn Hills	United States	The Palace of Auburn Hills	Primus	14,848 / 14,848	$367,117
March 29, 1994	Rosemont	United States	Rosemont Horizon	Primus	21,664 / 21,664	$528,362
March 30, 1994	Rosemont	United States	Rosemont Horizon	Primus	21,664 / 21,664	$528,362
April 1, 1994	Peoria	United States	Peoria Civic Center	Primus	8,345 / 8,345	$187,762
April 2, 1994	Madison	United States	Dane County Coliseum	Primus	8,013 / 9,000	$197,680
April 4, 1994	St. Louis	United States	St. Louis Arena	Primus	13,570 / 13,570	$322,505
April 5, 1994	Kansas City	United States	Kemper Arena	Primus	11,561 / 11,561	$277,330
April 7, 1994	Milwaukee	United States	Bradley Center	Primus	9,809 / 15,000	-
April 8, 1994	Minneapolis	United States	Target Center	Primus	12,722 / 12,722	$307,600
April 9, 1994	Moline	United States	MARK of the Quad Cities	Primus	7,053 / 7,053	$177,350
April 18, 1994	Buffalo	United States	Buffalo Memorial Auditorium	Candlebox	10,608 / 13,700	$263,334
April 20, 1994	Pittsburgh	United States	Civic Arena	Candlebox	11,062 / 12,000	$267,991
April 22, 1994	East Rutherford	United States	Brendan Byrne Arena	Candlebox	14,083 / 14,679	$365,829
April 23, 1994	Uniondale	United States	Nassau Coliseum	Candlebox	11,585 / 15,600	$313,286
April 24, 1994	Hartford	United States	Hartford Civic Center	Candlebox	9,747 / 13,000	$240,758
April 26, 1994	Landover	United States	USAir Arena	Candlebox	14,746 / 14,746	$357,485
~~April 27, 1994~~	Hampton	United States	Hampton Coliseum	Candlebox	-	
April 29, 1994	Philadelphia	United States	The Spectrum	Candlebox	23,979 / 27,090	$586,134
April 30, 1994	Philadelphia	United States	The Spectrum	Candlebox	23,979 / 27,090	$586,134
May 1, 1994	Providence	United States	Providence Civic Center	Candlebox	7,234 / 9,200	$184,415
May 3, 1994	Albany	United States	Knickerbocker Arena	Candlebox	10,001 / 12,250	$245,728
May 4, 1994	Rochester	United States	War Memorial Arena	Candlebox	8,138 / 8,138	$198,848
May 6, 1994	Montreal	Canada	Montreal Forum	The Doughboys	12,913 / 12,913	$402,701
May 7, 1994	Toronto	Canada	Maple Leaf Gardens	I Mother Earth	13,671 / 13,671	$416,982

=== Box office score data ===
List of box office score data with date, city, venue, attendance, gross, references
Date (1994)	City	Venue	Attendance	Gross	Ref(s)
January 22	Pensacola, United States	Civic Center	8,422 / 8,422	$176,550	
January 23	New Orleans, United States	Lakefront Arena	7,432 / 7,432	$180,302	
February 5	Anaheim, United States	Arrowhead Pond	13,460 / 13,460	$333,647	
February 7	San Diego, United States	Sports Arena	11,242 / 11,668	$226,598	
March 11–12	Worcester, United States	Centrum	22,127 / 25,008	$535,570	
March 23	Richfield, United States	Coliseum	14,717 / 14,717	$360,270	
March 29–30	Rosemont, United States	Rosemont Horizon	21,665 / 21,665	$528,363	
April 4	St. Louis, United States	Arena	13,570 / 13,570	$322,305	
April 20	Pittsburgh, United States	Civic Arena	11,062 / 12,000	$267,991	
April 22	East Rutherford, United States	Meadowlands Arena	14,083 / 14,083	$365,829	
April 23	Uniondale, United States	Nassau Veterans Memorial Coliseum	11,585 / 11,585	$313,287	
April 29–30	Philadelphia, United States	Spectrum	23,979 / 27,090	$586,134	
May 6	Montreal, Canada	Forum	12,913 / 12,913	$291,306	

== Personnel ==
- Geddy Lee – vocals, bass, keyboards
- Alex Lifeson – guitar, backing vocals
- Neil Peart – drums
