= Anatomy of a Drum Solo =

Video by Neil Peart
- Released: December 12, 2005
- Recorded: 2004–2005
- Genre: Progressive rock
- Length: 200 minutes
- Label: Hudson Music / Rounder Records
- Producer: Neil Peart

Neil Peart chronology
A Work In Progress (2002)	Anatomy of a Drum Solo (2005)

Anatomy of a Drum Solo is an instructional DVD by Rush drummer Neil Peart, presenting live and in-studio performances discussing his approach to soloing. Taking "Der Trommler", a drum solo recorded in September 2004 in Frankfurt, Germany as a framework, Peart presents the concepts and technique behind each segment of this nine-minute drum solo, which is a feature of each Rush live performance.

Anatomy of a Drum Solo also features:

- Two explorations - completely improvised workouts at the drums, each over 30 minutes long.
- A drum solo recorded in Hamburg, Germany in September, 2004.
- "O Baterista", Neil's Grammy Award-nominated solo, from the Vapor Trails Tour.
- Two Rush performances from the Frankfurt 2004 concert, all shot from the perspective of the drum cameras.
- Camera Option: During Peart's performance of "Der Trommler", the viewer can choose between the program edit and two isolated camera views.
- Alternate Edits: During parts of Peart's analysis of "Der Trommler" the viewer can choose between the program edit, or an alternate edit with the playing example shown full-screen without Peart's commentary.
- Audio-only tracks: "Momo's Dance Party" and "Pieces of Eight", composed and performed by Peart, which can be accessed at various points in the program,
- Interview with Paul Northfield, Rush co-producer and engineer, and Lorne Wheaton, Peart's drum technician.
- Two Rush performances from the perspective of the drum cameras.
- A previously unreleased solo from Rush's 1994 Counterparts Tour.
