= Cold Fire (song) =

Song by Rush

from the album Counterparts
- Released: October 18, 1993
- Recorded: April–June 1993
- Genre: Hard rock
- Length: 4:25
- Label: Anthem (Canada); Atlantic
- Songwriters: Neil Peart, Alex Lifeson and Geddy Lee
- Producers: Peter Collins, Rush

Rush singles chronology
"Stick It Out" (1993)	"Cold Fire" (1993)	"Nobody's Hero" (1994)

"Cold Fire" is a song by the Canadian progressive rock band Rush. It was released on their 1993 album Counterparts. The song peaked at No. 2 on the U.S. mainstream rock chart.

== Personnel ==
- Geddy Lee – vocals, bass, synthesizer
- Alex Lifeson – guitars, backing vocals
- Neil Peart – drums

== See also ==
- List of Rush songs
