= Animate (disambiguation) =

Animation is the interpolation of dissimilar frames over a finite period.

Animate may also refer to:

- Animate noun or animacy, a grammatical category
- Animate (retailer), a Japanese anime retailer
- "Animate" (song), by Rush
- "Animate", a song by Northlane from their 2015 album Node
- Adobe Animate, an animation program created by Adobe Systems

== See also ==
- Animism, the idea spirits exist in natural phenomena
