= The Twilight Zone (song) =

Single by Rush

from the album 2112
- B-side: "Lessons"
- Released: June 1976
- Recorded: January 1976
- Studio: Toronto Sound (Toronto, Canada)
- Genre: Progressive rock
- Length: 3:19
- Label: Mercury
- Songwriters: Geddy Lee, Alex Lifeson, Neil Peart
- Producers: Rush and Terry Brown

Rush singles chronology
"Lakeside Park" (1976)	"The Twilight Zone" (1976)	"The Temples of Syrinx" (1976)

Music video
- "The Twilight Zone" on YouTube

"The Twilight Zone" is the third track on Rush's album 2112. It was the last track written and recorded for the album. It was the first single to be released from 2112. As with most Rush songs, the lyrics are written by Neil Peart, and the music by Geddy Lee and Alex Lifeson. It is based on two episodes of The Twilight Zone: "Will the Real Martian Please Stand Up?" (first verse) and "Stopover in a Quiet Town" (second verse). Rush dedicated the song to the memory of The Twilight Zone creator Rod Serling.

The creators of the Marvel comic book series Defenders dedicated its 45th issue to Rush. In that issue, a character named Red Rajah says that "Truth is false and logic lost, consult the Rajah at all cost," as an homage to the lyrics of The Twilight Zone song.

== Cover versions ==
Steven Wilson recorded a version of this song in 2016, which was included on the 40th anniversary reissue of 2112.

== Track listing ==
Side A
No.	Title	Writer(s)	Length
1.	"The Twilight Zone"	Geddy Lee, Alex Lifeson, Neil Peart	3:14

Side B
No.	Title	Writer(s)	Length
1.	"Lessons"	Lifeson	3:48

== Personnel ==
Credits are adapted from 2112 liner notes.

- Geddy Lee – vocals, bass
- Alex Lifeson – guitar
- Neil Peart – drums, percussion

== See also ==
- List of Rush songs
