= Test for Echo (song) =

Single by Rush

from the album Test for Echo
- Released: 1996
- Length: 5:56
- Label: Anthem
- Songwriters: Neil Peart, Pye Dubois, Geddy Lee, Alex Lifeson
- Producers: Peter Collins, Rush

Rush singles chronology
"Double Agent" (1994)	"Test for Echo" (1996)	"Half the World" (1996)

Audio
- "Test for Echo" on YouTube

"Test for Echo" is the title track and first single from Canadian rock band Rush's 16th studio album, Test for Echo (1996). The song's lyrics were written by Neil Peart and Pye Dubois with music written by Geddy Lee and Alex Lifeson. The song reached No. 1 on the US Billboard Mainstream Rock Tracks chart. It was the band's fourth consecutive album to yield a chart-topper on this chart, along with "Show Don't Tell" from Presto, "Dreamline" from Roll the Bones, and "Stick It Out" from Counterparts. The song also peaked at number six on the Canadian RPM 100 Hit Tracks chart, which was the band's highest position on that chart since "New World Man" peaked at number one in 1982.

== Charts ==
=== Weekly charts ===
Chart (1996)	Peak position
Canadian RPM Singles Chart	6
Canadian RPM Alternative 30	11
US Billboard Mainstream Rock Tracks	1

=== Year-end charts ===
Chart (1996)	Position
Canada Top Singles (RPM)	80
US Mainstream Rock Tracks (Billboard)	26

== See also ==
- List of Rush songs
- List of number-one mainstream rock hits (United States)
