= 2112 (album) =

1976 studio album by Rush

Studio album by Rush
- Released: March 24, 1976
- Recorded: January 1976
- Studios: Toronto Sound (Toronto, Ontario, Canada)
- Genres: Progressive rock; heavy metal; space rock
- Length: 38:42
- Label: Mercury
- Producers: Rush; Terry Brown

Rush chronology
Caress of Steel (1975)	2112 (1976)	All the World's a Stage (1976)

Singles from 2112
- 1. "The Twilight Zone" Released: June 1976; 2. "The Temples of Syrinx" Released: February 1977

Alternative cover
- 40th anniversary reissue

2112 (pronounced "twenty-one twelve") is the fourth studio album by Canadian rock band Rush, released in the United States on March 24, 1976, by Mercury Records. Released after the disappointing sales of their second and third albums, Fly by Night and Caress of Steel, 2112 became the band's first major commercial success. The album reached No. 5 on the Canadian charts and No. 61 in the United States. 2112 has since remained a steady seller with a cult following among some Rush fans.

The band was in financial hardship after Caress of Steel sold poorly and drew an unfavourable critical reception, and saw a decline in attendance at its shows. Mercury, their international label, considered dropping them but granted one more album after negotiations with manager Ray Danniels. Pressed to deliver more commercial material, the band decided instead to continue developing the progressive rock direction they had explored on Caress of Steel.

Side one of the album consists of the 20-minute futuristic science-fiction title track, while side two holds shorter songs that display their hard rock roots. 2112 was released to favourable reviews from music critics and quickly outsold the band's previous albums. In Europe, the album was initially made available through imports by Phonogram Records in June 1976. Rush toured the album extensively in 1976 and 1977, which culminated in their debut concerts in Europe in June 1977.

2112 remains the band's second-highest-selling album, behind Moving Pictures, with more than 4 million copies sold in the US alone. It is listed in the book 1001 Albums You Must Hear Before You Die and ranked second on Rolling Stone's 2012 readers' poll of favourite prog rock albums of all time. 2112 has been reissued several times: a 40th Anniversary Edition was released in 2016 with previously unreleased material, including the album performed by numerous contemporary artists.

== Background ==
In January 1976, Rush ended its tour to support 1975's Caress of Steel. The band had enjoyed writing and recording the album. However, guitarist Alex Lifeson recalled the group was in a state of confusion after the tour, sensing the disappointing reaction from crowds after playing songs from it on stage. The album marked the band's foray into progressive rock with lengthy, story-based songs; more complex song structures; and cerebral lyrics, which made it hard to persuade radios to play it. Vocalist and bassist Geddy Lee said the band could not understand the underwhelming response, and later dubbed the tour the "Down the Tubes Tour" as they struggled to meet their $125-a-week salary while crowds declined. Lee wrote, "That really shakes your confidence. We were so confused and disheartened." In 1980, Lifeson, who had formed the band in 1968, said this was the only moment in its history when he felt close to giving up.

Neither Fly by Night nor Caress of Steel had charted in the top half of the Billboard 200, and Rush's international label, Mercury Records, considered dropping them. Peart recalled seeing label owner Polygram's financial predictions for the forthcoming year, and the band were not listed. To help the situation, Rush manager Ray Danniels flew to the label's head offices in Chicago to try to regain confidence and spoke highly of the band's ideas for a new album, though he had heard none of it. The band had chosen to exclude Danniels from the writing and recording sessions. But Danniel's plea met success, and Mercury approved one more album. Despite pressure from the label and management to make a more commercial record, the band proceeded with material as they saw fit. Lifeson said, "I remember having these conversations about, 'What are we going to do? Are we going to try to make another mini-Led Zeppelin record or are we going to do what we are going to do and continue forward and whatever happens, happens?' ... We fully intended to [not] go down in flames but we were prepared to do that." Drummer and lyricist Neil Peart looked back on the situation: "We had been working towards something a little more ambitious on each of the previous two albums. We simply decided that 2112 would have to be the realization of all our hopes." After the commercial success of 2112 and its tour, the band vowed to take full creative control of their music from that point on.

== Writing and recording ==
Rush put down musical ideas for 2112 in backstage dressing rooms, hotel rooms, and in their van while touring Caress of Steel in the second half of 1975. Peart had begun writing lyrics, to which Lee and Lifeson would develop songs on acoustic guitars that complemented the mood. This was a departure from the pair using their acoustic guitars to write heavy rock arrangements that were eventually recorded on electric instruments, although some passages were written on electric guitar using a portable Pignose practise amplifier. Lee and Lifeson composed with little overdubbing so they could recreate the music on stage. Lifeson recalled developing "The Temples of Syrinx" backstage at a gig in Sault Ste. Marie, Ontario, in front of their opening act Mendelson Joe. The "Overture" was the final piece to be written on the album. Lifeson said 2112 was the first Rush album that "really sounded like Rush".

In January 1976, the band entered Toronto Sound Studios to record with their longtime associate Terry Brown assuming his role as producer, operating a Studer 24-track machine. Lifeson plays a 1968 Gibson ES-335 for most of the electric guitar parts, with some lead parts played on a Gibson Les Paul Standard. For the acoustic sections, he plays a 12-string Gibson B-45 and a six-string Gibson Dove. His amplifiers were the Fender Super Reverb and a Twin Reverb. A section of "Discovery" features a Fender Stratocaster that Lifeson borrowed from a friend. Lee used a Rickenbacker 4001 bass with stereo output; Brown fed one pickup into the mixing board and then into a compressor, and the other was channelled into Lee's Electro-Voice speakers turned up to the maximum. Upon completing the album, the band expressed an interest in recording in another studio to explore different sounds.

== Songs ==
=== Side one ===
Side one is occupied by the 20-minute futuristic science-fiction song "2112". The seven-part track is based on a story by Peart who credits American novelist Ayn Rand, inventor of the philosophy of Objectivism and author of the dystopian fictional novella Anthem, the plot of which bears several similarities to "2112". The band had read the book, and Peart added the credit in the album's liner notes to avoid legal action. The reference to Ayn Rand led to Barry Miles, in the British paper NME, accusing the band of being "fascists"; this particularly offended Geddy Lee, whose parents were Holocaust survivors, and he defended the song as an "anti-totalitarian, anti-fascist story". "Overture" begins with a soundscape from musician and album cover artist Hugh Syme performed on his ARP Odyssey synthesizer with an envelope filter and Echoplex Delay pedal. Music writer and professor Rob Bowman calculated that in the entire piece, 2:34 of the song contains improvised guitar solos. "Overture" contains the lyric "And the meek shall inherit the earth", a reference to the Biblical passages Book of Psalms 37:11 and Matthew 5:5; it also briefly quotes Tchaikovsky's 1812 Overture.

"2112" tells a story set in the city of Megadon in the year 2112, after an intergalactic war in 2062 led many planets to be ruled by the Solar Federation (symbolized by the Red Star on the cover artwork), where individualism and creativity are outlawed. The population is controlled by a cabal of priests living in the temples of Syrinx, who take orders from giant banks of computers that control all aspects of life ("The Temples of Syrinx"). An unnamed protagonist finds a guitar inside a cave and rediscovers the lost art of music ("Discovery"). Upon playing the guitar to the priests, they destroy it and declare music a waste of time and against the computers' plan ("Presentation"). In a dream, an oracle shows him a planet established simultaneously with the Solar Federation, where an elder race flourish in creativity and individuality ("Oracle: The Dream"). He awakens, depressed that music is part of such a society that he can never be part of and kills himself ("Soliloquy"). The song ends with an ambiguous spoken ending: "Attention all planets of the Solar Federation: We have assumed control" ("Grand Finale"). Peart later said that after the protagonist took his own life, another planetary war begins and the elder race take down the Solar Federation in an ending he described as a "double surprise ... a real Hitchcock killer".

=== Side two ===
Side two contains five songs that display the band's more traditional hard-rock sound and Lee singing in the higher pitches featured on their previous albums. Lifeson said while having a title track more serious, the rest of the album was to be "just a little lighter and a little more fun". Bowman wrote that the variation of styles on side two offers "a very different listening experience" in comparison. Though the tracks are not specifically about the "2112" concept, they do contain ideas that can relate to its overall theme. Lee wrote the lyrics for "Tears" and Lifeson the lyrics to "Lessons", while Peart wrote the rest.

"A Passage to Bangkok" is a song about marijuana; Lee said it is "a travelogue for all the places in the world that grow the best weed". The track mentions Bogotá, Jamaica, Acapulco, Morocco, Bangkok, Lebanon, Afghanistan, and Kathmandu. Rush wrote and recorded "The Twilight Zone" in a single day to fill out side two. The band were big fans of the television series The Twilight Zone and based the track on the stories written for it from its host, Rod Serling. "Lessons" is one of the few Rush songs written solely by Lifeson. "Tears" is a romantic ballad and is the first Rush track to incorporate the Mellotron, which Syme performs. "Something for Nothing" is a song about free will and decision-making. Peart was inspired by graffiti on a wall that he saw while on his way to perform at the Shrine Auditorium in Los Angeles that read "Freedom isn't free". Lifeson said that its theme, shared with the "2112" suite, makes the track a coda to the record.

== Artwork ==
The album was packaged in a gatefold sleeve designed and produced by longtime Rush cover artist Hugh Syme. It marks the first appearance of the emblem later known by fans as the "Starman" logo, which was adopted into the band's stage design and future album covers. Peart used it on the front bass drum heads of his kit from 1977 to 1983, and again in 2004 and 2015. The Red Star, a symbol of the Solar Federation depicted in the "2112" suite, represents what Peart described as "any collectivist mentality", while the man represents the protagonist of the story and to Peart, "the abstract man against the masses". Syme said: "That he is nude is just a classic tradition ... the pureness of his person and creativity without the trappings of other elements such as clothing". In July 2013, the Starman logo was featured on a Canada Post stamp honouring Rush. The gatefold includes a photograph of the band dressed in white and standing in front of a wind machine, and was a shoot Lifeson remembered for being particularly awkward.

== Commercial performance ==
2112 was released in March 1976 on vinyl, 8-track cartridge, and cassette tape. It received strong promotion from Polydor, the distributor of Mercury Records albums, who issued an advertising campaign based on graphics on the album sleeve, in major trade publications. It became Rush's second album after Fly by Night to enter the top ten on the Canadian Albums Chart, peaking at No. 5. In the US, it peaked at No. 61 on the Billboard Top LPs & Tape chart, the week of 29 May 1976, during a 37-week stay on the chart. It was the band's first to crack the U.S. top 100.

The album sold faster than any of Rush's previous albums. In June 1976, the album had outsold the band's past catalogue in Canada and the United States, selling close to 35,000 and more than 200,000 copies, respectively. 2112 became a strong seller in the United States; it reached gold certification by the Recording Industry Association of America (RIAA) in November 1977 for selling 500,000 copies. In August 2026, the album reached quadruple platinum for selling more than 4 million copies, becoming Rush's second-biggest seller after Moving Pictures.

== Reception ==
Professional ratings
Review scores
Source	Rating
AllMusic	4.5/5 stars
Collector's Guide to Heavy Metal	7/9
The Encyclopedia of Popular Music	4/5 stars
The Essential Rock Discography	8/10
MusicHound Rock	3/5 stars
The Rolling Stone Album Guide	3/5 stars
The Virgin Encyclopedia of 80s Music	3/5 stars

Professional ratings (reissues)
Review scores
Source	Rating
The Guardian	(2012)
PopMatters	9/10 (2016)
Rolling Stone	(2012)

Cashbox praised the album, calling it "a valid and melodic tale ... the story/song is a definite cohesive listen". They said of "Temples of Syrinx" that it "combines growling guitars with an incredibly shrill lead vocal." In an article about 2112 for Creem, Dan Nooger wrote the album "features some significant Mellotron meanderings and amazingly eccentric lyrics".

2112 was included in IGN's list "10 Classic Prog Rock Albums". In a reader's poll held by Rolling Stone, it placed second on the list of favourite prog rock albums. In a 4.5 out of 5 star-review, AllMusic's Greg Prato said that "1976's 2112 proved to be [Rush's] much sought-after commercial breakthrough and remains one of their most popular albums."

The Audio-Visual Preservation Trust of Canada, a non-profit Canadian charitable organization dedicated to promoting the preservation of Canada's audio-visual heritage, has sponsored MasterWorks, which annually recognizes twelve culturally significant Canadian classics from the film, radio, TV and music industries. In 2006, 2112 was one of the albums chosen to be preserved.

In 2018, the album won the Polaris Heritage Prize Audience Award in the 1976–1985 category.

Ultimate Classic Rock included the album on their list of the "Top 100 '70s Rock Albums". Prog readers voted 2112 the 15th best progressive rock album of all time.

2112 is the tenth favorite album of Megadeth co-founder and frontman David Mustaine.

== Tour ==
Rush promoted 2112 with a concert tour of the United States, Canada, and for the first time in their career, across Europe, between February 1976 and June 1977. The tour saw the band perform over 140 shows. To make their set tighter, "Discovery" and "Oracle: The Dream" were omitted from the performance of the "2112" suite. However, "Discovery" was performed on later performances of "2112" on tours for A Farewell to Kings and Hemispheres. Rush would not perform the track in its entirety until their 1996 tour following the release of Test for Echo. The shows at Massey Hall in Toronto in June 1976 were recorded and compiled for release as their double live album All the World's a Stage.

== Reissues ==
Year	Label	Format	Notes
1987	Anthem	CD	
1993	Mobile Fidelity Sound Lab	CD	As part of the "Original Master Recordings" collection with a 24k gold-plated disc.
1997	Anthem/Mercury	CD	As part of "The Rush Remasters" collection.
2011	Anthem	CD	Digitally remastered by Andy VanDette as part of the reissue of Rush's Mercury-era albums.
2012	Mercury	CD, DVD, Blu-ray	Digitally remastered Deluxe Edition including a 5.1 surround sound mix and bonus content.
2015	Anthem/Mercury/Universal	LP	Digitally remastered by Sean Magee at Abbey Road Studios on 200g vinyl and AAC digital format.
2016	Anthem/Mercury/Universal	CD, DVD, LP	40th Anniversary Edition with bonus content, including new studio tracks featuring various musicians performing the album.

== Track listing ==
=== Original release ===
All lyrics are written by Neil Peart, except where noted.

Side one
No.	Title	Music	Length
1.	"2112" I. "Overture" (4:31) II. "The Temples of Syrinx" (2:16) III. "Discovery" (3:25) IV. "Presentation" (3:41) V. "Oracle: The Dream" (2:00) VI. "Soliloquy" (2:19) VII. "Grand Finale" (2:16)	Geddy Lee, Alex Lifeson (Note: "Discovery" and "Presentation" are solely composed by Lifeson)	20:34

Side two
No.	Title	Lyrics	Music	Length
1.	"A Passage to Bangkok"		Lee, Lifeson	3:32
2.	"The Twilight Zone"		Lee, Lifeson	3:16
3.	"Lessons"	Lifeson	Lifeson	3:51
4.	"Tears"	Lee	Lee	3:30
5.	"Something for Nothing"		Lee	3:59

2012 Deluxe Edition bonus tracks
No.	Title	Length
7.	"I. Overture" (Live at Northlands Coliseum, 1981)	4:31
8.	"II. The Temples of Syrinx" (Live at Northlands Coliseum – Edmonton, AB, Canada, 25 June 1981)	2:19
9.	"A Passage to Bangkok" (Live at Manchester Apollo – Manchester, England, 17 June 1980)	3:57

=== 40th Anniversary Edition (2016) ===
Bonus disc
No.	Title	Length
1.	"Solar Federation"	0:18
2.	"Overture" (Performed by Dave Grohl, Taylor Hawkins and Nick Raskulinecz)	4:01
3.	"A Passage to Bangkok" (Performed by Billy Talent)	3:37
4.	"The Twilight Zone" (Performed by Steven Wilson)	4:21
5.	"Tears" (Performed by Alice in Chains)	4:21
6.	"Something for Nothing" (Performed by Jacob Moon)	3:54
7.	"2112" (Live at Massey Hall Outtake)	15:50
8.	"Something for Nothing" (Live at Massey Hall Outtake)	4:08
9.	"The Twilight Zone" (Live 1977 Contraband)	3:28
10.	"2112 1976 Radio Ad"	1:00

== Personnel ==
Credits are adapted from the album's 1976 liner notes.

Rush

- Geddy Lee – vocals, bass
- Alex Lifeson – guitar
- Neil Peart – drums, percussion

Additional musician

- Hugh Syme – ARP Odyssey synthesizer on "Overture", Mellotron on "Tears"

Production

- Rush – production, arrangements
- Terry Brown – production, arrangements, engineering, mixing
- George Graves at JAMF – original mastering
- Hugh Syme – graphics
- Yosh Inouye – photography
- Gerard Gentil – photography (band)
- Ray Danniels and Vic Wilson, SRO Productions – management
- Moon Records – executive production

== Charts ==
Chart (1976)	Peak position
Canada Top Albums/CDs (RPM)	5
Swedish Albums (Sverigetopplistan)	33
US Billboard 200	61

== Certifications ==
Region	Certification	Certified units/sales
Canada (Music Canada)	2× Platinum	200,000^{^}
United Kingdom (BPI) 1997 release	Gold	100,000^{‡}
United States (RIAA)	4× Platinum	4,000,000^{‡}
^{^} Shipments figures based on certification alone.^{‡} Sales+streaming figures based on certification alone.
