= Half the World =

Half the World may refer to:

- "Half the World" (Belinda Carlisle song)
- "Half the World" (Rush song)
- "Half the World", a song by Arcane Roots from Melancholia Hymns
- Half the World, a novel in the Shattered Sea series by Joe Abercrombie
- A nickname of city of isfahan
