= A Work in Progress (film) =

Video by Neil Peart
- Released: October 9, 1997 (VHS); April 23, 2002 (DVD)
- Recorded: January – March 1996
- Genre: Progressive rock
- Label: Warner Brothers

A Work in Progress is a Neil Peart DVD, documenting the "work in progress" of recording Rush's Test for Echo album, as well as an extensive discussion of the fundamental reinvention of Peart's percussion technique by the tutelage of the expert Freddie Gruber. Peart's special approach to drums is featured in various individual songs from Test for Echo. Other topics include a discussion of his DW drumset, his approach to odd times, playing with a vocalist, and a "guided tour" of Neil's warmup routine.

The DVD includes an original composition titled "Momo's Dance Party," from which Peart would frequently play excerpts during his drum solos in live Rush shows for the next 10 years.

== External links – videos ==
- From Limbo
- Fill workout
- Gadd Style fills
