= Freddie Gruber =

American drummer (1927–2011)

- Born: May 27, 1927; The Bronx, New York
- Origin: New York City
- Died: October 11, 2011 (aged 84) Los Angeles, California
- Genres: Jazz
- Occupations: Musician; teacher
- Instrument: Drums
- Years active: c. 1946–2011
- Website: Official web site

Freddie Gruber (May 27, 1927 – October 11, 2011) was an American jazz drummer and teacher to a number of professional drummers.

Gruber grew up in the nascent New York City bebop scene. Although he started his performance career as a tap dancer, by the mid-1940s while still in his teens he had toured as a drummer with Rudy Vallée and played with Harry Gibson. In 1949 Gruber began playing with Charlie Parker among many others.

After fighting his own heroin addiction, Gruber left New York City shortly after Parker's death in 1955. He settled in Los Angeles in 1957 after a stint in Las Vegas, where he continued working as a professional jazz drummer. Gruber began teaching drums in the mid-1960s at a Los Angeles music store owned by vibraphonist Terry Gibbs.

Gruber's student list includes Vinnie Colaiuta, Eddie Rubin, Neil Peart, Steve Smith, Dave Weckl, Bruce Becker, Joey Waronker, Ross Garfield, and his last student before he died, Paul Goldberg. Gruber was an instructor and mentor at the Drum Channel Studio.

On January 15, 2011, Gruber was honored at the NAMM Show in Anaheim, California, with a lifetime achievement award for educational excellence throughout his career. The large framed award featured a classic photo of legendary jazz drummers: Buddy Rich, Jo Jones (known as Papa Jo Jones in his later years), and Gruber himself. Under the photo was a plaque and a cymbal that was signed by Armand Zildjian's children. Later in October 2011 Gruber died from illness.

Gruber's former drum student, Neil Peart of Rush, lauded Gruber in his literary and tutorial work. Peart authored a biographical obituary tribute which was posted to the Hudson Music website and to Gruber's own web site.

== Sources ==
- Jazz Improv Magazine Tribute to Buddy Rich: "Way Beyond Drums, Buddy Rich, A Portrait of the Man." (Spring 2006)
- The Commandments of Early Rhythm and Blues Drumming - by Zoro and Daniel Glass (2008)
- Ghost Rider: Travels on the Healing Road - by Neil Peart (2002)
- Travelling Music: Traveling Music : The Soundtrack to My Life and Times - by Neil Peart (2003)
- Rhythm and Light - by Carrie Nuttall (2005)
- Rush: Chemistry : The Definitive Biography - by Jon Collins (2005)
- Roadshow : Landscape With Drums: A Concert Tour by Motorcycle - by Neil Peart (2006)
- Far and Away: A Prize Every Time - by Neil Peart (2011)
- Rush: Beyond the Lighted Stage (2010)
- A Work in Progress
