= Test for Echo =

Studio album by Rush
- Released: September 10, 1996
- Recorded: January–April 1996
- Studios: Bearsville (Bearsville, New York); Reaction (Toronto, Ontario, Canada)
- Genres: Progressive rock; hard rock; art rock
- Length: 53:32
- Label: Anthem
- Producers: Peter Collins; Rush

Rush chronology
Counterparts (1993)	Test for Echo (1996)	Retrospective I (1997)

Test for Echo is the sixteenth studio album by the Canadian rock band Rush, released on September 10, 1996, by Anthem Records. It was the final Rush album to be co-produced by Peter Collins. The band supported the album with a world tour in 1996 and 1997, after which they went on a five-year hiatus following the deaths of drummer Neil Peart's daughter and wife.

The title track reached No. 1 on the mainstream rock chart. The song "Driven" became a bass showcase for Geddy Lee during live performances, while "Resist" was rearranged as an acoustic song on the Vapor Trails and R30 tours. The band did not perform any tracks from the album on subsequent tours. Test for Echo was remastered and reissued twice: in 2004 as a continuation of "The Rush Remasters" set and in 2013 as a part of the box set The Studio Albums 1989–2007. In 2015, it was reissued after being remastered at Abbey Road Studios by Sean Magee, whom Rush had hired to remaster their back catalogue.

== Background and pre-production ==
In May 1994, Rush finished their Counterparts Tour of the United States and Canada in support of the band's 15th album Counterparts (1993). The group's customary post-tour break became an 18-month hiatus because bass guitarist and vocalist Geddy Lee wanted to be at home for the first year of his daughter's life. With their free time, guitarist Alex Lifeson recorded his first solo album Victor and drummer/lyricist Neil Peart released a Buddy Rich tribute album Burning for Buddy and spent time on his technique, receiving formal instruction from the jazz drummer Freddie Gruber. For the majority of the album, Peart plays with a traditional grip.

In October 1995, the band decided to start work on the next Rush album and, as with their previous three albums, retreated to Chalet Studios in Claremont, Ontario, to write and rehearse. Having been together for more than 20 years at this point, Lifeson questioned whether Test for Echo would be Rush's last album, and if they would tour behind it. He changed his mind when it was finished, as the group was already in talks about the next album and said, "We've got a lot of stuff in us yet." The first sessions were difficult for him, having had full control of Victor and now returning to the "same old" discussions with Lee as to what direction the new Rush album would be before to writing. "Once I exorcised those ghosts, the following week we wrote five songs. We dove into it and it was very, very positive from then on". The band put up inspirational slogans on the studio wall, including "Individually we are a ass, together we are a genius" and "If you want something done right, just forget it". Lee and Lifeson completed almost six songs before they presented any of their work to Peart as they did not want to interrupt the flow of their productive writing. They had reserved the studio for around ten weeks, but the productive sessions resulted in the writing finishing three weeks early. Lifeson said the group were in particularly good spirits throughout the album's production and put it down to the break they had taken.

The band adopted its usual method of Lee and Lifeson working on the music with Peart working alone on the lyrics, but the music was written in a different way than before. In the past, the writing had Lee and Lifeson form songs by matching pieces of music to verses and choruses as they went and all three would listen to what was put down and exchange ideas to develop them further. This time, lyrics were matched with suitable sections of music, after which they were recorded and Lee and Lifeson would work on something else. As Peart wrote: "They didn't want to get bogged down in the 'jigsaw puzzle' of assembling whole songs, but rather keep the momentum going with a flow of fresh ideas." After a collection of songs were worked out, the group started to refine their individual parts. In November 1995, the group were faced with heavy snow at Chalet Studios which led into the North American blizzard of 1996 in early January. The snow continued through the recording of the album, which inspired the album's artwork.

Almost all of the tracks were written, arranged and put onto a demo tape by December 1995. Peter Collins, who had co-produced Power Windows (1985), Hold Your Fire (1987), and Counterparts, returned to the role. He contributed what Peart described as "small-but-critical improvements" to what they had already recorded. The album continued the group's stylistic change, which had started on Presto (1989), towards guitar-oriented music and the reduction of keyboards.

== Recording ==
The album was recorded from January to March 1996 at Bearsville Studios in Bearsville, New York. The studio was chosen because the band wanted to capture "more size" from Peart's drums and the facility was more suited to his kit. Additional recording took place at Reaction Studios in Toronto, where it snowed for 40 consecutive days. Test for Echo was the first time Rush worked with American engineers and mixers, having only worked with English or Australian personnel before. They chose the recording engineer Clif Norrell, a longtime fan of the band who once performed Rush cover songs in his own group.

The album was mixed in April 1996 by Andy Wallace at McClear Place in Toronto. The group made a conscious decision not to enter the studio until Wallace had prepared a mix for them to comment on. Lifeson said, "We'd hear completely different takes on these songs that we'd lived with for six or seven months. [...] There were things that we really wouldn't have thought of, and that was really the whole point of him being there". Upon release, Lifeson rated Test for Echo as one of Rush's best albums.

== Songs ==
"Test for Echo" features lyrical contributions from Pye Dubois who had also written lyrics for three Rush songs prior. Lee said the words reflect the group's current situation at the time. Lifeson plays a Les Paul Custom guitar and described the song as "pure Rush".

"Driven" was written entirely on Lee's bass guitar and features three separate bass tracks. Lifeson said that Peart played "a little bit back on the beat" which gave the song a "heavier character" and caused Lee and himself to adjust their parts to fit his drums.

"Half the World" features Lifeson playing a 10-string mandola which he had played to get a feel for the instrument, but found it changed the song's personality completely. He presented it to Lee who expressed initial doubts as it displayed an unusual texture, but grew to like it.

"Time and Motion" originated from a set of lyrics that Peart had written, after which Lee and Lifeson worked on music for it which developed quickly. They wanted to dramatise the first lyrical phrase by incorporating major chords, but Lee said a first version of the track was put together some years prior, but never used.

Lee described "Dog Years" as "a bit punky".

"Limbo" is an instrumental track that was pieced together from different bits of ideas that the group had sketched out but remained unused.

Lifeson picked "Resist" as one of his favourite tracks, and among the best Rush had ever recorded.

== Artwork ==
The cover displays an inuksuk, native to Canada. Created by the Inuit, an inuksuk is a stone figure in the shape of a human used to mark a food cache, hunting ground or a place where someone lost their life.

== Release ==
The album was premiered in its entirety during a two-hour syndicated radio special on WRCX in Chicago, on September 5, 1996.

== Reception ==
Contemporaneous reviews
Review scores
Source	Rating
The Buffalo News	3.5/5 stars
Detroit Free Press	3/4 stars
Entertainment Weekly	B
Express News Service	A
Edmonton Journal	3/5 stars
The Grand Rapids Press	2.5/4 stars
The Indianapolis Star	3.5/4 stars
Pittsburgh Post-Gazette	3/5 stars
The San Bernardino County Sun	5/10
Southam Newspapers	2.5/5 stars

Retrospective reviews and music guides
Review scores
Source	Rating
AllMusic	3/5 stars
The Encyclopedia of Popular Music	2/5 stars
The Essential Rock Discography	5/10
MusicHound Rock	3/5 stars
The Rolling Stone Album Guide	3/5 stars
Sputnikmusic	3.0/5
The Virgin Encyclopedia of 80s Music	2/5 stars

The AllMusic reviewer, Stephen Thomas Erlewine, gave Test for Echo three out of five stars, saying that Rush has "rarely played better in the past ten years than they have on Test for Echo". Rolling Stone argued, "the buffed guitar and synthesizer contours of Test for Echo are welcome relief from the bland din of modern-rock celebrities like Dishwalla."

In a retrospective analysis, Geddy Lee stated in Rush: An Oral History, Uncensored that Test for Echo was a "strange record" saying "Test for Echo was a strange record in a sense. It doesn’t really have a defined direction. I kind of felt like we were a bit burnt creatively. It was a creative low time for us."

== Track listing ==
All tracks are written by Geddy Lee, Alex Lifeson, and Neil Peart except "Test for Echo" by Lee, Lifeson, Peart, and Pye Dubois.

No.	Title	Length
1.	"Test for Echo"	5:56
2.	"Driven"	4:27
3.	"Half the World"	3:43
4.	"The Color of Right"	4:48
5.	"Time and Motion"	5:01
6.	"Totem"	4:58
7.	"Dog Years"	4:55
8.	"Virtuality"	5:44
9.	"Resist"	4:23
10.	"Limbo" (instrumental)	5:29
11.	"Carve Away the Stone"	4:06

== Personnel ==
Credits taken from the album's liner notes.

Rush

- Geddy Lee – bass guitar, vocals, synthesizers
- Alex Lifeson – electric and acoustic guitars, mandola
- Neil Peart – drums, cymbals, hammer dulcimer

Production

- Rush – production, arrangements
- Peter Collins – production, arrangements
- Clif Norrell – recording engineer
- Simon Pressey – project assistant engineer
- Chris Laidlaw and Paul Marconi – recording assistants at Bearsville Studios
- Tom Heron – recording assistant at Reaction Studios
- Andy Wallace – mixing
- Bob Ludwig – original mastering
- Andrew MacNaughtan, Anthony Frederick, Dimo Safari, Eugene Fisher and Richard C. Negus – photography
- Hugh Syme – art direction, design, digital illustration
- Anthem Entertainment (Liam Birt and Pegi Cecconi) – executive production

== Charts ==
Weekly chart performance for Test for Echo
Chart (1996)	Peak position
Canada Top Albums/CDs (RPM)	3
Dutch Albums (Album Top 100)	53
Finnish Albums (Suomen virallinen lista)	9
German Albums (Offizielle Top 100)	45
Japanese Albums (Oricon)	50
Swedish Albums (Sverigetopplistan)	26
UK Albums (Official Charts)	25
US Billboard 200	5

== Certifications ==
Region	Certification	Certified units/sales
Canada (Music Canada)	Gold	50,000^{^}
United States (RIAA)	Gold	500,000^{^}
^{^} Shipments figures based on certification alone.
