= Driven (Rush song) =

Single by Rush

from the album Test for Echo
- Released: 1997
- Recorded: 1996
- Genre: Hard rock, progressive rock, heavy metal
- Length: 4:27
- Label: Anthem (Canada), Anthem/Atlantic
- Songwriters: Neil Peart, Geddy Lee, Alex Lifeson
- Producers: Peter Collins, Rush

Rush singles chronology
"Half the World" (1996)	"Driven" (1997)	"Virtuality" (1997)

"Driven" is a song by Canadian rock band Rush from their 1996 album Test for Echo. It was the third of five singles released from the album and reached No. 3 on the US Mainstream Rock chart.

Lead singer and bassist Geddy Lee said about the song:

'Driven' is just from a bass player’s point of view. I wrote that song with three tracks of bass. I brought it to Alex and said, 'Here’s the song; I did three tracks of bass, but I just did that to fill in for the guitar', and he said, 'Let’s keep it with the three basses.' So, I said, 'I love you.'

"Driven" would later be included on Rush's compilation album Retrospective 3 (2009).

== Track listing ==
No.	Title	Lyrics	Music	Length
1.	"Driven"	Neil Peart	Geddy Lee, Alex Lifeson	4:27

== See also ==
- List of songs recorded by Rush
