= Half the World (Rush song) =

Single by Rush

from the album Test for Echo
- Released: 1996
- Recorded: 1996
- Genre: Progressive rock, hard rock
- Length: 3:43
- Label: Atlantic
- Songwriter(s): Neil Peart, Geddy Lee, Alex Lifeson
- Producer(s): Peter Collins, Rush

Rush singles chronology
"Test for Echo" (1996)	"Half the World" (1996)	"Driven" (1997)

"Half the World" is a song and single by progressive rock band Rush from their 1996 album Test for Echo. A music video was made for the song. The song peaked at number 6 on the U.S. Billboard Mainstream Rock Tracks chart.

== Track listing ==
No.	Title	Lyrics	Music	Length
1.	"Half the World"	Neil Peart	Geddy Lee, Alex Lifeson	3:43

== Charts ==
Chart performance for "Half the World"
Chart (1997)	Peak position
US Mainstream Rock (Billboard)	6

== See also ==
- List of Rush songs
