= Animate (song) =

Song by Rush

from the album Counterparts
- Released: October 18, 1993
- Recorded: 1993
- Genre: Progressive rock
- Length: 6:04
- Label: Anthem (Canada); Atlantic
- Songwriters: Neil Peart (lyrics), Geddy Lee, Alex Lifeson (music)
- Producers: Peter Collins, Rush

Rush singles chronology
"Nobody's Hero" (1994)	"Animate" (1993)	"Double Agent" (1994)

"Animate" is a song by Canadian progressive rock band Rush from their 1993 album Counterparts. The song reached number 35 on the Billboard Mainstream Rock chart in 1994, staying on the charts for three weeks.

The band's singer and bassist, Geddy Lee, said "I love 'Animate'. I think it’s one of the great songs we've done. There's something about the bestiality of that song, the insistence of it."

"Animate" would later be included on Rush's compilation Retrospective 3 (2009).

== Composition and recording ==
"Animate" features Lee playing his bass with an old amplifier that was in the studio garbage and repaired by one of the studio's technical assistants. Shirley wanted Lee to play his parts to "Animate" with it. "It sounded great, I had a tremendous amount of energy, and all the explosion sounds of it kind of disappeared in the track, so you're not really aware of the fact that it's an amplifier on the verge of death." Lee liked Peart's count in at the start of the track as it displays a "human touch". Lyrically, Peart wrote the words about one person yet structured them to make it as if it may concern a relationship, "almost a love song." He thought that such love lyrics had become a cliché throughout the 1980s, however, and turned to works by Jung and Camille Paglia to understand "what the modern man was supposed to be." Peart said he plays a "basic R&B rhythm that I played back in my early days, coupled with that hypnotic effect" that bands like Curve and Lush used.

The song is in the key of D minor. The lead vocal ranges in pitch from B3 to A5.

== Reception ==
AllMusic described the song as being "straightforward". Classic Rock Review thought that the song had a "decent overall sound" and a "very entertaining middle part".

In a 1994 interview with Modern Drummer Magazine, the band's drummer, Neil Peart, said about the song: "I used a basic R&B rhythm that I played back in my early days, coupled with that hypnotic effect that a lot of the British bands of the turn of the '90s had – bands like Curve and Lush. The middle section of the tune is the result of the impact African music has had on me, although it wasn't a specific African rhythm."

== Covers ==
The melodic death metal band Allegaeon released a cover of the song as a single on 5 January 2018. Mitchel Winney of MetalSucks said that the cover is a fine performance of the song, but that it was too close to the original. Loudwire thought that the cover was "solid filler" for fans that were waiting on Allegaeon's next album. Greg Kennelty of Metal Injection praised their cover, saying it was fantastic.
