= 2112 (song) =

Rush song from the album 2112

Song by Rush

from the album 2112
- Released: March 1976
- Recorded: January 1976
- Studio: Toronto Sound (Toronto)
- Genre: Progressive rock; space rock; progressive metal
- Length: 20:33 (Note: Length of actual song, as noted on the CD.)
- Label: Anthem; Mercury
- Composers: Geddy Lee; Alex Lifeson
- Lyricist: Neil Peart
- Producers: Rush; Terry Brown

Rush suite chronology
"The Fountain of Lamneth" (1975)	"2112" (1976)	"Cygnus X-1: Book One – The Voyage" (1977)

Music video
- "2112" on YouTube

"The Temples of Syrinx"

Single by Rush

from the album 2112
- B-side: "Making Memories"
- Released: February 1977 (US)
- Recorded: January 1976
- Studio: Toronto Sound (Toronto)
- Genre: Progressive rock
- Length: 2:19
- Label: Mercury
- Songwriters: Neil Peart; Geddy Lee; Alex Lifeson

Rush singles chronology
"The Twilight Zone" (1976)	"The Temples of Syrinx" (1977)	"Closer to the Heart" (1977)

Music video
- "2112: The Temples of Syrinx" on YouTube

"2112" (pronounced "twenty-one twelve") is a song by the Canadian rock band Rush. It was released as a 20-minute song on their 1976 album 2112, and is the longest song by the band. The overture and the first section, "The Temples of Syrinx", were released as a single. The song was adapted into a comic booklet, which used the lyrics of the song as lines for the characters and the narrations from the cover as intros.

== Parts ==
No.	Title	Starts at (approx.)	Length
1.	"Overture"	0:00	4:33
2.	"The Temples of Syrinx"	4:33	2:12
3.	"Discovery"	6:45	3:29
4.	"Presentation"	10:14	3:42
5.	"Oracle: The Dream"	13:56	2:00
6.	"Soliloquy"	15:56	2:21
7.	"Grand Finale"	18:17	2:14
Total length:			20:33

== Composition ==
This song is described in the liner notes of the album—its interior and back cover—in two ways:

1. by the actually sung lyrics, and
2. by the narrative of the song's Protagonist—identified as "Anonymous, 2112"—quoted and italicized like entries from a personal journal—on the back cover and before the lyrics of all songs except "Overture" and "Grand Finale".

Lyricist/drummer Neil Peart is credited in the liner notes as acknowledging "the genius of Ayn Rand" (though the 1997 remaster acknowledges "genus" rather than genius). Neil Peart explained the influence that she had on his music, saying in a 1991 "Rockline" interview:

The inspiration behind it was . . . It's difficult always to trace those lines because so many things tend to coalesce, and in fact it ended up being quite similar to a book called Anthem by the writer Ayn Rand. But I didn't realize that while I was working on it, and then eventually as the story came together, the parallels became obvious to me and I thought, 'Oh gee, I don't want to be a plagiarist here.' So I did give credit to her writings in the liner notes.

=== I: "Overture" ===
The "sci-fi" sounds in the beginning of the song were created using an ARP Odyssey synthesizer and an Echoplex tape delay. On the "2112 / Moving Pictures" episode of the documentary series Classic Albums, producer Terry Brown states the synth intro is composed of various parts played by Hugh Syme that were put together in a collage. This part musically foreshadows the rest of the song—incorporating movements from "The Temples of Syrinx", "Presentation", "Oracle: The Dream", and "Soliloquy"—as well as a guitar adaptation of Tchaikovsky's 1812 Overture. Its sole lyric, at the end, "And the meek shall inherit the Earth", is a reference to the Beatitudes of the New Testament and Psalm 37:11.

=== II: "The Temples of Syrinx" ===
The song introduces life within the "Solar Federation" under control of the "Priests of the Temples of Syrinx". The computerized nature of The Priests' system was a concept envisioned by Neil Peart in the 1970s.

It was released as a single, and Record World said that Rush's "brand of hard, heavy metal, as put forth in this rocker, should soon find a place on the pop airwaves."

=== III: "Discovery" ===
The Protagonist finds a guitar in a cave by a waterfall. He figures out how to tune and play it, enabling him to make his own music. He states "How different it could be from the music of the Temples." He decides to perform it before the Priests, believing they will "praise my name" for letting "[the people] make their own music". In this song, guitarist Alex Lifeson builds up from simple open string guitar playing into increasingly complex patterns and chords, showing the man's progress as he teaches himself to play the guitar. Printed on the album were the lyrics "Chords that build high like a mountain." Geddy Lee sang it this way for the 1996 live album. However, the original recorded lyrics were "sounds" instead of "chords" ("sounds that build...").

=== IV: "Presentation" ===
The Protagonist performs before the Priests, but they tell him that "we have no need for ancient ways", and dismiss the instrument as a "silly whim" that "doesn't fit the plan". The Protagonist tries to explain, "our world could use this beauty; just think what we might do". However, the Priests tell him, "Don't annoy us further." Vocalist/bassist Geddy Lee and guitarist Alex Lifeson alternately represent the Protagonist with gentle, low-pitched vocals and clean guitar, and the Priests with high-pitched vocals and distorted, hard rock guitar. The song ends with a guitar solo, which represents the Priests destroying the guitar.

=== V: "Oracle: The Dream" ===
The Protagonist "wanders home" and has a vision of the past and future. An oracle shows him the way it was before the Federation rose, a society where creativity and individuality flourished, with great "sculptured" works of beauty driven by "the pure spirit of man." He now sees that without these things, life has become "meaningless." He also sees "the hand of man arise with hungry mind and open eyes". The "elder race" was not destroyed, but "left our planets long ago", plotting to ultimately return "home to tear the Temples down."

=== VI: "Soliloquy" ===
The protagonist returns to the cave and broods for "days". He imagines "what my life might be in a world like I have seen"; he now considers life under the Federation "cold and empty", with his spirits "low in the depths of despair". He resolves that, in order to "pass into the world of my dream, and know peace at last", he must take his own life, his narrative ending as "my life blood spills over."

=== VII: "Grand Finale" ===
The song concludes with a hard rock instrumental part. Pingree's Music Reviews says, "'2112' ends with the oppressive government being attacked by another entity, left entirely up to the listener's interpretation." On the Classic Albums episode on 2112 and Moving Pictures, Lee comments on the ambiguity of the ending, but Peart states that his intent was that the Elder Race successfully deposed the Solar Federation. As the Grand Finale ends, the lines "Attention, all planets of the Solar Federation" followed by "We have assumed control" are spoken three times each. It has been pointed out that the closing lines of seven words said three times and four words said three times results in two groups of 21 and 12 words respectively, thus 2112, but Alex Lifeson said that this was unintentional.

== Personnel ==
Credits are adapted from 2112 liner notes.

Rush

- Geddy Lee – vocals, bass
- Alex Lifeson – guitar
- Neil Peart – drums, percussion

Additional musician

- Hugh Syme – ARP Odyssey synthesizer on "Overture"

== Popular culture ==
This song is on Guitar Hero: Warriors of Rock where it is used within the game's storyline (four band warriors find Demigod's Battle Axe Guitar and must play all parts of "2112" on basic controllers). The level is narrated by Rush.

The song was made available to download on December 31, 2011 as both 3 pieces and as the complete 20-minute track, for play in Rock Band 3. Along with the basic gameplay offered with similar games in its series, the song also allowed players to utilize the Rock Band 3 exclusive Pro mode, which made use of MIDI guitars and a MIDI compatible electronic drum-kit to simulate playing the real song. It is the longest song available for the Rock Band series.

The song and its universe feature in the novel Ready Player One by Ernest Cline as fundamental plot elements; the song also got a visual reference in its film adaptation.

In June 2021, a major Canadian 2112 TV series was proposed to Rush, which met with internal content approval via Anthem and Dentons. However, the strain a massive project of its kind would place upon Geddy Lee and Alex Lifeson was cited for its ultimate dismissal.

== See also ==
- List of Rush songs
