= Counterparts (Rush album) =

Studio album by Rush
- Released: October 18, 1993
- Recorded: April – June 1993
- Studios: Le Studio (Morin-Heights); McClear Pathé (Toronto)
- Genres: Hard rock; progressive rock; alternative rock
- Length: 54:24
- Label: Anthem
- Producers: Peter Collins; Rush

Rush chronology
Roll the Bones (1991)	Counterparts (1993)	Test for Echo (1996)

Singles from Counterparts
- 1. "Stick It Out" Released: October 1, 1993; 2. "Nobody's Hero" Released: April 1994

Counterparts is the fifteenth studio album by Canadian rock band Rush, released October 18, 1993, in the UK and October 19 worldwide, through Anthem Records. After the band finished touring its previous album Roll the Bones (1991) in mid-1992, the members took a break before starting work on a follow-up.

Counterparts reached No. 2 in the United States, one of the band's two highest-charting albums in the country, and No. 6 in Canada. The first single, "Stick It Out", was No. 1 on the Billboard Album Rock Tracks chart for four weeks. In 1994, the instrumental "Leave That Thing Alone" was nominated for a Grammy Award for Best Rock Instrumental Performance. Counterparts was remastered in 2004 and reissued in 2013 as part of The Studio Albums 1989–2007 box set. In 2015 it was reissued after being remastered by Sean Magee at Abbey Road Studios following a direct approach by Rush to remaster their entire back catalogue.

== Background and writing ==
In June 1992, the band finished their Roll the Bones Tour in support of Roll the Bones (1991). Before the group started to work on the album they casually set out some goals that they wanted to achieve with it from conversations during the Roll the Bones Tour. They agreed to achieve "a sense of balance between spontaneity and refinement [...] and perhaps work on a more organic approach to the songs". The group agreed that rock band Primus, who opened for them on the Roll the Bones Tour, and Pearl Jam influenced them to tweak their sound further.

As with their previous two studio albums, Rush retreated to Chalet Studios in Claremont, Ontario, to write and rehearse new material during the week, returning home on weekends to see their families. They adopted their usual practice of Lee and Lifeson working on the music while Peart worked alone on the lyrics. They stayed at Chalet for about two months, and rehearsed well enough so they could concentrate on obtaining a satisfactory sound and a spontaneous performance for their respective parts. Lee and Lifeson put their ideas down using an eight-track Alesis Digital Audio Tape recorder with Cubase Audio software. The group faced many technical problems which delayed the writing process to the point where Peart had a short amount of time to arrange his parts, but as Lee recalled: "He went through a massive rehearsal period; he works tremendously hard and it's incredible to witness."

Counterparts marks a continuation in the band's transition from synthesizers back to guitar-oriented music which had started on Presto (1989). Lifeson said that this was the first time since Moving Pictures (1981) that there was a conscious decision to have the guitar take a predominant role, resulting in a more satisfying album for him. The writing sessions were met with increased tension between Lee and Lifeson, matters of which began on the Roll the Bones Tour over musical differences. Lifeson had constantly asked for Lee not to use any keyboards for the album but Lee brought them into the studio which created "an immediate atmosphere." Lee maintained that keyboards were used on Roll the Bones merely to embellish the songs and wished to use them in the same manner for Counterparts. "But Alex was making assumptions that I wanted keyboards all over the place. It was a very volatile situation." Lifeson said that the two had "greater emotional ups and downs" during the writing stage than any other previous Rush album and partly blamed various personal "external pressures" that did not relate to either's personal lives.

When it came to writing lyrics, Peart did not have a form of common thread between the individual songs like he had on Roll the Bones and instead devised "a selection of individual themes I didn't really associate at the time." Among the topics he thought about were the differences between genders, the anima and animus principle devised by psychologist Carl Jung, and the good and bad regarding heroism. Peart did point out that duality became the only unifying theme and inspired the album's title.

== Recording ==
Lee recalled the difficulty the band had in achieving more power from some tracks with producer Rupert Hine on Roll the Bones in the studio but were able to on tour, "and I think that stuck in the back of our minds." This matching of music and production style became an element that the band wanted to focus on for Counterparts and in doing so wanted to work with different producers and engineers. Initially, they talked to a lot of young producers, but they soon realized that there was little to gain from someone who had worked on fewer albums than the group had released over its career, and sought someone experienced. Rush chose English producer Peter Collins who'd co-produced Power Windows (1985) and Hold Your Fire (1987) with the band. Lee said that the band had remained friendly with Collins, and noticed he'd developed as a producer since they'd last worked with him, including his work with more American rock bands. "As soon as we talked we knew it would be great [...] and he agreed with the vision of what we saw; and his comments, criticizing the past couple records, sonically anyway, were very much in line with the direction we wanted to go, and we thought, 'Bingo! Here you go, this is what we need.' Collins had different engineers in mind to work with, so a "laborious but interesting search" took place to find someone suitable that involved hearing tapes from artists worldwide. In the end, they chose Kevin "The Caveman" Shirley for the recording; Lee said it was because of his "raw" and "natural" sound, which required minimal use of reverb which was difficult for the band to get used to at first. For mixing, the band employed Australian engineer Michael Letho.

The album was recorded from April to June 1993 at Le Studio in Morin-Heights, Quebec, and McClear Pathé in Toronto. The 8-track demos were transferred onto the studio's 24-track recorder and became guide tracks for the band to follow and re-record their parts. Lifeson recorded his parts onto analogue tape; the rest were put down digitally. With Peart having less time to record his parts, he put down 11 tracks in three days. Lifeson said Shirley adopted a "very direct" way of recording the instruments to capture as little resistance from the microphones to the tape machine as possible. Though various effects were explored with later, Lifeson commented on the simplicity of recording: "It was just a matter of plugging into the amp and miking it". He'd resisted the idea of recording his guitars outside of the studio's control room for the past 12 years, but Shirley talked him into playing in the studio room. After a few days, Lifeson enjoyed the experience and wanted to continue recording in this manner: "You could feel the wood of the guitar vibrating against your body, and it was more susceptible to that really cool feedback, and it was your own little world; it was a little bit of an escape." Lee used his 1972 Fender jazz bass and Lifeson played Les Paul, Fender Telecaster and PRS guitar models. He often combined the Les Paul and Telecaster, along with acoustic guitars, to create a single sound.

Upon completion, the album was mastered by Bob Ludwig at Gateway Mastering in Portland, Maine. The album's title was decided upon after the music was finished. Rush had difficulty in selecting the running order on Counterparts partly due to the fact that it was easier to separate the album with two sides of a vinyl. To help, Lifeson listed each track on a magnetic board so they could play around with the order until they had one that they were happy with. Lifeson drew a graphical representation of the mood for each track which helped them select an order which Lee said helps "to ease you out of the record" as much of the album had an aggressive edge. The band had planned to release the album earlier but Lifeson said that would have meant starting the tour earlier, but no members were keen to do so.

== Songs ==
"Animate" features Lee playing his bass with an old amplifier that was in the studio garbage and repaired by one of the studio's technical assistants. Shirley wanted Lee to play his parts to "Animate" with it. "It sounded great, I had a tremendous amount of energy, and all the explosion sounds of it kind of disappeared in the track, so you're not really aware of the fact that it's an amplifier on the verge of death." Lee liked Peart's count in at the start of the track as it displays a "human touch". Lyrically, Peart wrote the words about one person yet structured them to make it as if it may concern a relationship, "almost a love song." He thought that such love lyrics had become a cliché throughout the 1980s, however, and turned to works by Jung and Camille Paglia to understand "what the modern man was supposed to be." He then took Jung's concept of anima and animus to write about a man dominating his softer, feminine side with aggression and ambition, more typical male traits. Peart said he plays a "basic R&B rhythm that I played back in my early days, coupled with that hypnotic effect" that bands like Curve and Lush used.

"Stick It Out" developed from a guitar riff that Lifeson had come up with which Lee had liked, so they "stretched it out a bit, added a few more things and it became that song."

"Cut to the Chase" is one of the few songs on the album where Lifeson's original guide guitar solo on the demo tape was used on the final take.

"Nobody's Hero" was inspired by a gay friend of Peart's who worked with him during his time in London and considered his friend as a role model. For Peart, he "prevented me from ever being homophobic" and when they drifted apart geographically, he found out that his friend had died of AIDS. "So, it's certainly not like his life was in vain, but his heroism was in a very small arena." Collins suggested having a string section added and chose Michael Kamen to orchestrate and conduct, so Lee devised some orchestral ideas that were included in the final arrangement.

"Between Sun & Moon" features lyrics co-written by Peart and Pye Dubois, who'd also shared lyrical credits for "Tom Sawyer" and "Force Ten". Peart had always welcomed Dubois' contribution of ideas as he had liked his style of writing. "In this case that was one that we all responded to some of the images in his presentation, so again I went to work on it, shaped it up into the kind of structure that we like to work with, and then added some of my own images and angles on it. And so it went". The music developed from a jam that had Lifeson play a riff that Lee said had a "very un-Alex Lifeson sound," comparing it to the style of The Rolling Stones. Lifeson pointed out the musical bridge before his guitar solo sounds "very Whoish", and named their guitarist Pete Townshend and Rolling Stones guitarist Keith Richards as influences.

"Double Agent" was one of the final tracks written for the album and it was described by Lee as "a complete exercise in self-indulgence." Having come up with songs that were more complex in arrangement, Lee fancied a change of pace and have a track where the band has "a bit of a rave."

"Leave That Thing Alone" is an instrumental the group decided to do because they have fun writing them as ideas get put down for them quickly. Lee and Lifeson clarified that despite the connection between it and the instrumental "Where's My Thing?" from Roll the Bones where they both have "Thing" in the titles, there is no further link between the two. Lifeson rated the track's melody as particularly strong.

"Cold Fire" went through several rewrites and Lee credited Collins in helping to put the song together by highlighting the strongest sections in the previous versions. Lee and Lifeson then got a feel into the previously difficult verses which led to Lifeson adding his steel guitar-like parts to which Lee was able to contribute harmonics. Following the difficulty, Lee rated the verses as one of the album's strongest moments.

== Release ==
Before the album was released, it premiered during a radio special hosted by Steve Warden on CILQ in Toronto on October 14, 1993.

It debuted at No. 2 on the Billboard album chart for the week ending Nov. 6, 1993, kept out the top spot by another debuting album, Pearl Jam's Vs. Counterparts earned a gold certification in the United States in December 1993. The album earned a gold certification in Canada in 1994.

The band supported Counterparts with a four-month tour limited to the United States and Canada. Relations between the members were reportedly tense, and they followed the tour with a long break, during which lead singer/bass player Geddy Lee planned to spend time with his growing family, while each member explored other creative interests, such as a Lifeson solo album.

== Reception ==
Professional ratings
Review scores
Source	Rating
AllMusic	3.5/5 stars
The Encyclopedia of Popular Music	2/5 stars
Entertainment Weekly	B−
The Essential Rock Discography	4/10
MusicHound Rock	4/5 stars
The Rolling Stone Album Guide	3/5 stars
The Virgin Encyclopedia of 80s Music	2/5 stars
The Collector's Guide to Heavy Metal	8/10

This album was well received by fans and reviewers, hitting the shelves at #2 on the charts (Rush's first album to do this), and going gold in only one month, despite being prog rock during the peak of grunge. The album did return the band to a more aggressive rock sound. Retroactively, it is seen as a typical Rush album, with strong composition and performance, but with somewhat formulaic, conservative song writing. On Spotify, Animate and Nobody's Hero each stand out as having two to three times as many plays as the next-most-played tracks. Progarchives calls it their best album of the 1990s.

== Track listing ==
All lyrics are written by Neil Peart, except "Between Sun & Moon" by Peart and Pye Dubois; all music is composed by Alex Lifeson and Geddy Lee.

Counterparts track listing
No.	Title	Length
1.	"Animate"	6:04
2.	"Stick It Out"	4:30
3.	"Cut to the Chase"	4:48
4.	"Nobody's Hero"	4:55
5.	"Between Sun & Moon"	4:37
6.	"Alien Shore"	5:47
7.	"The Speed of Love"	5:02
8.	"Double Agent"	4:52
9.	"Leave That Thing Alone" (instrumental)	4:05
10.	"Cold Fire"	4:27
11.	"Everyday Glory"	5:11

== Personnel ==
Credits taken from the album's 1993 liner notes.

Rush

- Geddy Lee – bass, vocals, synthesizer
- Alex Lifeson – electric and acoustic guitars
- Neil Peart – drums, cymbals, electronic percussion

Additional musicians

- John Webster – additional keyboards
- Michael Kamen – orchestration and conducting on "Nobody's Hero"

Production

- Rush – production, arrangements
- Peter Collins – production, arrangements
- Kevin "Caveman" Shirley – recording engineer
- Simon Pressey – recording and mixing assistant engineer
- Bill Hermans – assistant engineer at McClear Pathé
- Michael Letho – mixing
- Brett Zilahi – mix assistant
- Everett Ravestein – pre-production assistant at Lerxst Sound
- Bob Ludwig – original mastering
- Andrew MacNaughtan – photography
- Hugh Syme – art direction, design
- Anthem Entertainment (Liam Birt and Pegi Cecconi) – executive production

== Charts ==
=== Weekly charts ===
Weekly chart performance for Counterparts
Chart (1993)	Peak position
Canadian Albums (RPM)	6
Dutch Albums (Album Top 100)	56
Finnish Albums (Suomen virallinen lista)	13
German Albums (Offizielle Top 100)	47
Japanese Albums (Oricon)	35
Swedish Albums (Sverigetopplistan)	45
UK Albums (Official Charts)	14
US Billboard 200	2

=== Year-end charts ===
1993 year-end chart performance for Counterparts
Chart (1993)	Position
Canadian Albums (RPM)	49

== Certifications ==
Certifications and sales for Counterparts
Region	Certification	Certified units/sales
Canada (Music Canada)	Platinum	100,000^{^}
United States (RIAA)	Gold	500,000^{^}
^{^} Shipments figures based on certification alone.
