= Stick It Out (Rush song) =

Single by Rush

from the album Counterparts
- Released: October 1, 1993
- Recorded: 1993
- Genre: Hard rock, grunge
- Length: 4:30
- Label: Anthem (Canada); Atlantic
- Composers: Geddy Lee; Alex Lifeson
- Lyricist: Neil Peart
- Producers: Peter Collins; Rush

Rush singles chronology
"Ghost of a Chance" (1992)	"Stick It Out" (1993)	"Nobody's Hero" (1994)

"Stick It Out" is a song and single by the band Rush from their 1993 album Counterparts. The song debuted at number one on the Billboard Album Rock Tracks chart, becoming the band's only number one debut of their five chart-toppers. The song also reached number one on the RPM Cancon chart.

A music video was made for the song. It was briefly featured on an episode of Beavis and Butt-Head. It was also featured on the Retrospective III: 1989–2008 DVD included in the two-disc version.

== Background ==
Drummer and lyricist Neil Peart said of the song:

It’s just a play on the words, really. "Stick It Out" meaning both a kind of arrogant display, 'stick it out', but also the endurance thing; if you have a difficult thing to endure, stick it out and you get to the end. It was the pun on both of those, really, so again the duality in the song is a bit leaning both ways. The sense of forbearance, of holding back, and also the idea of fortitude: stick it out, you know, survive. But that was more of a piece of fun. That song, I would say, both lyrically and musically, verges on parody, and that was one I think we just had fun with, and lyrically I certainly did, too. 'Stick it out' and 'spit it out' and all that was just a bit of word play.

Lead singer and bassist Geddy Lee said:

I love the riff. It’s a great riff song. I love playing it, and it’s a very bass-heavy song, which always makes me happy. Lyrically, it’s kind of so-so. I don’t know. I think the best thing about it is the vibe and that it’s stripped down to a trio, back to doing riff rock.

== Track listing ==
No.	Title	Lyrics	Music	Length
1.	"Stick It Out"	Neil Peart	Lee, Lifeson	4:30

== Personnel ==
- Geddy Lee – bass guitar, vocals
- Alex Lifeson – guitars
- Neil Peart – drums, percussion

== See also ==
- List of Rush songs
- List of Billboard Mainstream Rock number-one songs of the 1990s
