= Nobody's Hero (song) =

Single by Rush

from the album Counterparts
- Released: April 1994
- Recorded: 1993
- Genre: Progressive rock
- Length: 4:54
- Label: Anthem (Canada); Atlantic
- Songwriters: Neil Peart (lyrics), Geddy Lee, Alex Lifeson (music)
- Producers: Peter Collins, Rush

Rush singles chronology
"Stick It Out" (1994)	"Nobody's Hero" (1994)

"Nobody's Hero" is a song by Canadian progressive rock band Rush, released as the third single from their 1993 album Counterparts. The first verse deals with the AIDS-related death of a gay man named Ellis Booth, a friend of Neil Peart when Peart lived in London. After the chorus, the second verse speaks of a girl who was murdered in Peart's hometown, Port Dalhousie and was the daughter of a family friend, as remembered by Peart in Far and Wide: Bring That Horizon to Me! The girl is rumoured to have been Kristen French, one of Paul Bernardo's victims.

It inspired the title for the paper Nobody's Hero: On Equal Protection, Homosexuality, and National Security published in The George Washington Law Review.

== Track listing ==
No.	Title	Lyrics	Music	Length
1.	"Nobody's Hero"	Neil Peart	Geddy Lee, Alex Lifeson	4:54
2.	"Stick It Out"	Neil Peart	Geddy Lee, Alex Lifeson	4:30

== Personnel ==
- Geddy Lee – bass, lead vocals
- Alex Lifeson – acoustic & electric guitars
- Neil Peart – drums, percussion
- John Webster – keyboards

with

- Michael Kamen – string arrangements & conducting

== Charts ==
Chart (1994)	Peak position
Canada Top Singles (RPM)	19
US Mainstream Rock (Billboard)	9

== See also ==
- List of Rush songs
