= Neil Peart =

Canadian drummer and lyricist (1952–2020)

Neil Peart OC
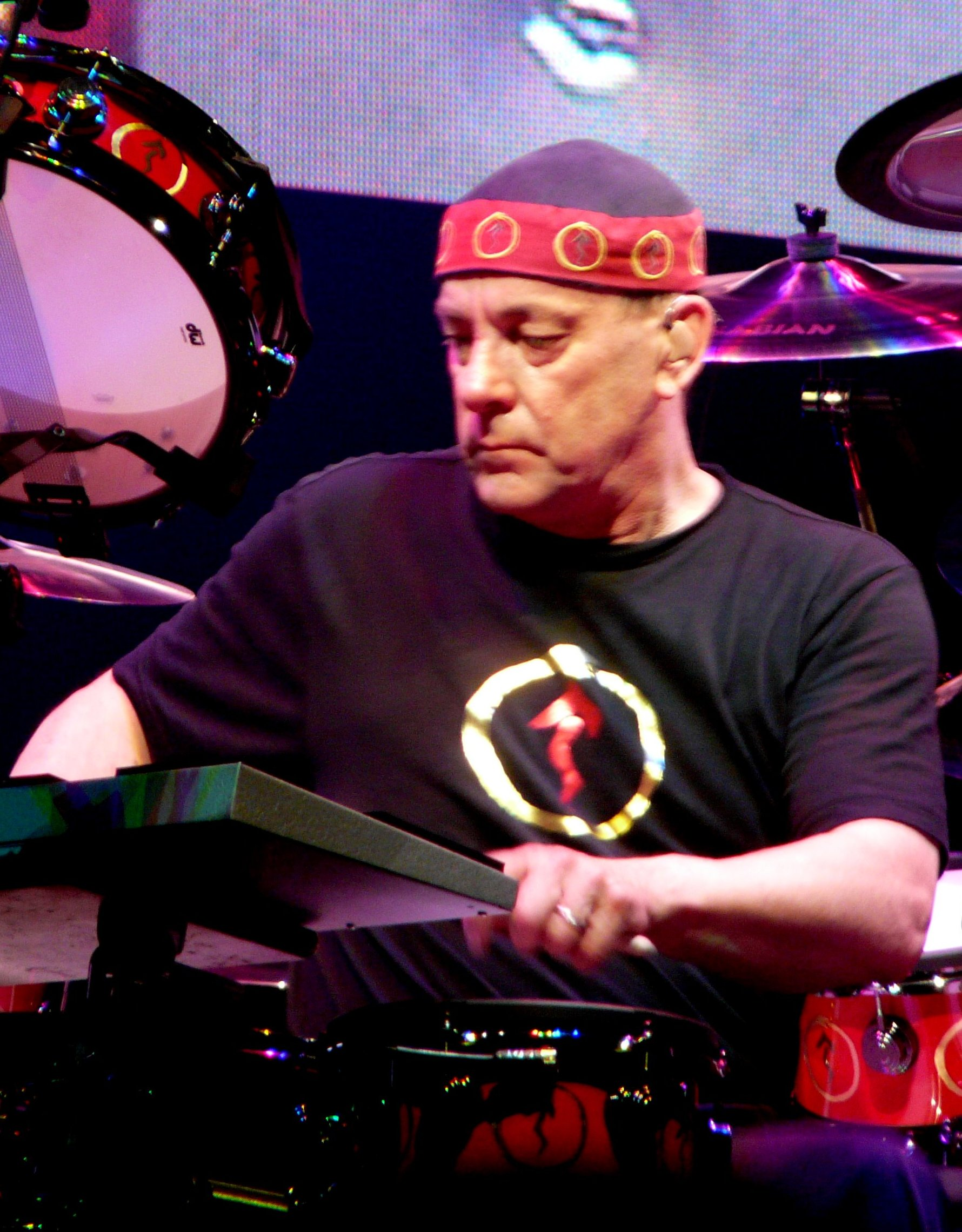
- Peart in 2008
- Born: Neil Ellwood Peart; September 12, 1952; Hamilton, Ontario, Canada
- Died: January 7, 2020 (aged 67); Santa Monica, California, U.S.
- Other names: The Professor, Bubba, Pratt
- Citizenship: Canada; U.S.
- Occupations: Musician; songwriter; author
- Years active: 1968–2015
- Musical career
- Genres: Progressive rock; hard rock; jazz; swing; heavy metal
- Instruments: Drums; percussion
- Labels: Atlantic; Mercury; Anthem
- Formerly of: Rush
- Peart's voice On his time recording and performing for Rush
- Website: neilpeart.net

Signature
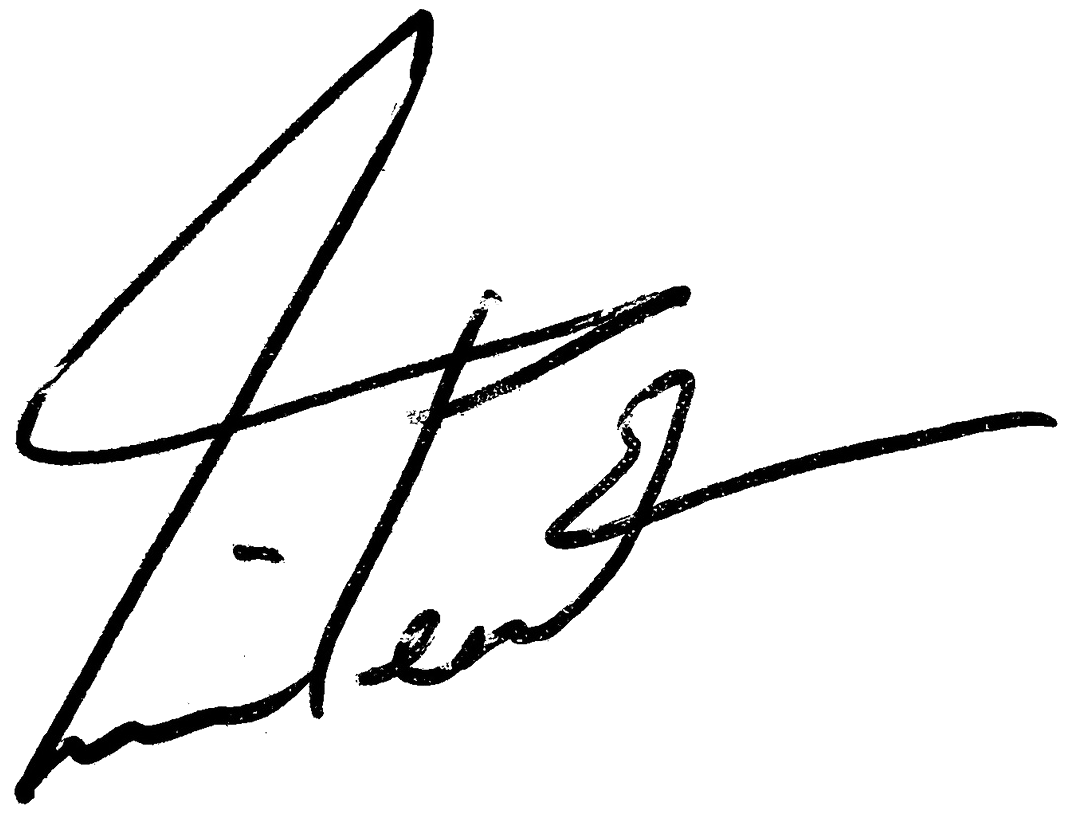

Neil Ellwood Peart (/pɪərt/ PEERT; September 12, 1952 – January 7, 2020) was a Canadian musician, songwriter and author, who was the drummer, percussionist, and primary lyricist of the progressive rock band Rush. He was nicknamed "the Professor", after his resemblance to the Gilligan's Island character of the same name. His drumming was renowned for its technical proficiency and his live performances for their exacting nature and stamina. Peart earned numerous awards for his musical performances, including an induction into the Modern Drummer Readers Poll Hall of Fame in 1983 at age 30, making him the youngest person ever so honoured.

Peart was born in Hamilton, Ontario, and grew up in Port Dalhousie (now part of St. Catharines). During adolescence, he floated between regional bands in pursuit of a career as a full-time drummer. After a discouraging stint in England, Peart returned home to concentrate on music, where he joined Rush, a Toronto band, in mid-1974, six years after its formation. Together they released 19 studio albums, with ten exceeding a million copies sold in the United States. Billboard lists the band third in "most consecutive gold or platinum albums by a rock band". (Note: Below the Beatles and the Rolling Stones.)

Early in his career, Peart's performance style was deeply rooted in hard rock. He drew most of his inspiration from drummers such as Keith Moon, Ginger Baker and John Bonham, who were at the forefront of the British hard rock scene at the time. Over time, he began to emulate jazz and big band musicians Gene Krupa and Buddy Rich. In 1994, Peart became a friend and pupil of jazz instructor Freddie Gruber. During this time, Peart revamped his playing style by incorporating jazz and swing components.

In addition to serving as Rush's primary lyricist, Peart published several memoirs about his travels. His lyrics for Rush addressed universal themes and diverse subjects, including science fiction, fantasy, and philosophy, as well as secular, humanitarian, and libertarian themes. Peart wrote a total of seven non-fiction books focused on his travels and personal stories. He also co-authored three steampunk fantasy novels with Kevin J. Anderson based on Rush's final album, Clockwork Angels. The two also wrote a dark fantasy novella, Drumbeats, inspired by Peart's travels in Africa.

Peart announced his retirement from touring in an interview with Drumhead Magazine in December 2015. In January 2018, bandmate Alex Lifeson confirmed that Rush had disbanded also due to Peart's health issues. During his final years, Peart lived in Santa Monica, California, with his wife, Carrie Nuttall, and daughter. After a three-and-a-half-year illness, Peart died of glioblastoma on January 7, 2020, at age 67.

== Early life ==
Peart was born on September 12, 1952, as the first child of Glen and Betty Peart and lived his early years on his family's farm in Hagersville, Ontario, on the outskirts of Hamilton. When he was two years old, the family moved to St. Catharines, where his brother, Danny (d. 2025), and sisters Judy and Nancy were born. At this time his father became parts manager for Dalziel Equipment, an International Harvester farm machinery dealer. In 1956 the family moved to the Port Dalhousie area of the town. Peart attended Gracefield School and later Lakeport Secondary School, and described his childhood as happy; he stated he experienced a warm family life. By early adolescence he became interested in music and acquired a transistor radio, which he would use to tune into popular music stations broadcasting from Toronto, Hamilton, Welland, and Buffalo.

Peart's first exposure to musical training came in the form of piano lessons; he later said in his instructional video A Work in Progress that these lessons did not have much influence on him. He had a penchant for drumming on various objects around the house with a pair of chopsticks, so for his 13th birthday his parents bought him a pair of drumsticks, a practice drum, and some lessons, with the promise that if he stuck with it for a year they would buy him a kit.

Peart satisfied the agreement, and his parents bought him a drum kit for his 14th birthday; furthermore, he began taking lessons from Don George at the Peninsula Conservatory of Music. His stage debut took place that year at the school's Christmas pageant in St. John's Anglican Church Hall in Port Dalhousie. His next appearance was at Lakeport High School with his first group, The Eternal Triangle. This performance contained an original number titled "LSD Forever". At this show he performed his first solo.

Peart got a job in Lakeside Park, in Port Dalhousie on the shores of Lake Ontario, which later inspired a song of the same name on the Rush album Caress of Steel. He worked on the Bubble Game and Ball Toss, but his tendency to take it easy when business was slack resulted in his termination. By his late teens, Peart had played in local bands such as Mumblin' Sumpthin', and the Majority. These bands practiced in basement recreation rooms and garages and played church halls, high schools, and skating rinks in towns across Southern Ontario such as Mitchell, Seaforth, and Elmira. They also played in the Northern Ontario city of Timmins. Tuesday nights were filled with jam sessions at the Niagara Theatre Centre.

== Career ==
=== Early career ===
At 18 years old (and after struggling to achieve success as a drummer in Canada), Peart travelled to London, England, hoping to further his career as a professional musician. Despite playing in several bands and picking up occasional session work, he was forced to support himself by selling jewellery at a shop called The Great Frog on Carnaby Street.

While in London, he came across the writings of novelist and philosopher Ayn Rand. Rand's writings became a significant early philosophical influence on Peart, as he found many of her writings on individualism and Objectivism inspiring. References to Rand's philosophy can be found in his early lyrics, most notably "Anthem" from 1975's Fly by Night and "2112" from 1976's 2112.

After 18 months, Peart became disillusioned by his lack of progress in the music business; he placed his aspiration of becoming a professional musician on hold and returned to Canada. Upon returning to St. Catharines, he worked for his father selling tractor parts at Dalziel Equipment.

=== Joining Rush ===
After returning to Canada, Peart was recruited to play drums for a St. Catharines band known as Hush, who played on the Southern Ontario bar circuit. Soon after, a mutual acquaintance convinced Peart to audition for the Toronto-based band Rush, which needed a replacement for its original drummer John Rutsey. Geddy Lee and Alex Lifeson oversaw the audition. His future bandmates describe his arrival that day as somewhat humorous, as he arrived in shorts, driving a battered old Ford Pinto with his drums stored in trashbags. Peart felt the entire audition was a complete disaster. Lee later remarked that he was instantly mesmerized by the way Peart played triplets, also hitting it off on a personal level (with similar tastes in books and music); meanwhile, Lifeson had a less favourable impression of Peart and still wanted to try out one last drummer.

After some discussion between Lee and Lifeson, Peart officially joined the band on July 29, 1974, two weeks before the group's first US tour. Peart procured a silver Slingerland kit which he played at his first gig with the band, opening for Uriah Heep and Manfred Mann's Earth Band in front of over 11,000 people at the Civic Arena in Pittsburgh on August 14, 1974.

Peart soon settled into his new position, also becoming the band's primary lyricist. Before joining Rush he had written a few songs, but, with the other members largely uninterested in writing lyrics, Peart's previously underutilised writing became as noticed as his musicianship. The band were working hard to establish themselves as a recording act, and Peart, along with the rest of the band, began to undertake extensive touring.

His first recording with the band, 1975's Fly by Night, was fairly successful, winning the Juno Award for most promising new act, but the follow-up, Caress of Steel, for which the band had high hopes, was greeted with hostility by both fans and critics. In response to this negative reception, most of which was aimed at the B-side-spanning epic "The Fountain of Lamneth", Peart responded by penning "2112" on their next album of the same name in 1976. The album, despite record company indifference, became their breakthrough and gained the band a following in the United States. The supporting tour culminated in a three-night stand at Massey Hall in Toronto, a venue Peart had dreamed of playing in his days on the Southern Ontario bar circuit and where he was introduced as "The Professor on the drum kit" by Lee.

Peart returned to England for Rush's Northern European Tour and the band stayed in the United Kingdom to record their next album, 1977's A Farewell to Kings, in Rockfield Studios in Wales. They returned to Rockfield to record the follow-up, Hemispheres, in 1978, which they wrote entirely in the studio. The recording of five studio albums in four years, coupled with as many as 300 gigs a year, convinced the band to take a different approach thereafter. Peart has described his time in the band up to this point as "a dark tunnel".

=== Playing style reinvention ===
In 1991, Peart was invited by Buddy Rich's daughter, Cathy Rich, to play at the Buddy Rich Memorial Scholarship Concert in New York City. Peart accepted and performed for the first time with the Buddy Rich Big Band. Peart remarked that he had little time to rehearse with the band, and noted that he was embarrassed to find the band played a different arrangement of the first song than the one he had learned. Feeling that his big-band drumming performance left much to be desired, Peart would subsequently try to make amends for this by producing and playing on two Buddy Rich tribute albums: Volumes 1 and 2 of Burning for Buddy: A Tribute to the Music of Buddy Rich, released in 1994 and 1997, respectively.

While producing the first of these albums, Peart was struck by the tremendous improvement in ex-Journey drummer Steve Smith's playing, and asked him his "secret". Smith responded he had been studying with drum teacher Freddie Gruber.

In early 2007, Peart and Cathy Rich discussed another Buddy tribute concert. At the recommendation of bassist Jeff Berlin, Peart once again augmented his swing style with formal drum lessons, this time under the tutelage of another pupil of Freddie Gruber, Peter Erskine, himself an instructor of Steve Smith. On October 18, 2008, Peart once again performed at the Buddy Rich Memorial Concert at New York's Hammerstein Ballroom. The concert has since been released on DVD.

=== Retirement ===
Peart described himself as a "retired drummer" in an interview in December 2015:

Lately Olivia has been introducing me to new friends at school as 'My dad—He's a retired drummer.' True to say—funny to hear. And it does not pain me to realize that, like all athletes, there comes a time to...take yourself out of the game. I would rather set it aside than face the predicament described in our song "Losing It"...

Peart had been suffering from chronic tendinitis and shoulder problems.

Geddy Lee clarified his bandmate was quoted out of context, and suggested Peart was simply taking a break, "explaining his reasons for not wanting to tour, with the toll that it's taking on his body." However, in January 2018, Alex Lifeson confirmed that Rush was "basically done". Peart remained friends with his former bandmates.

== Musicianship ==
=== Style and influences ===
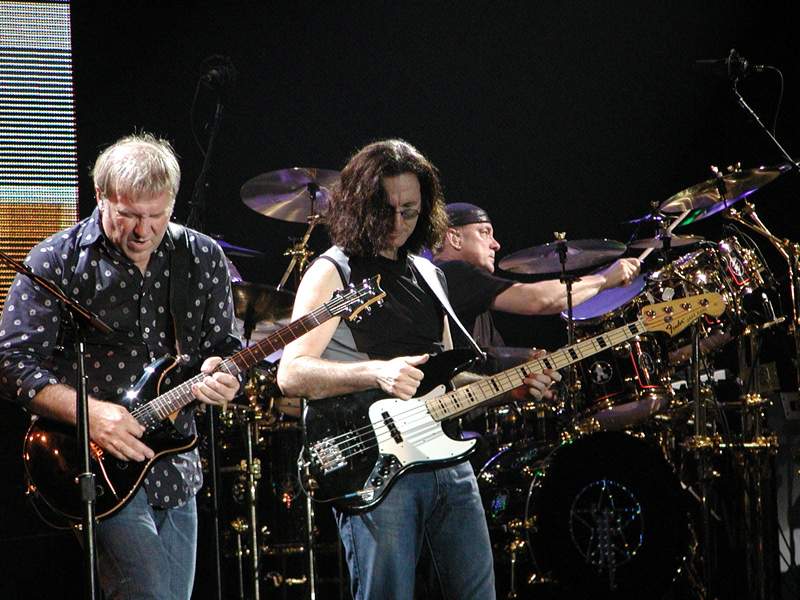
Peart (right, behind Alex Lifeson and Geddy Lee) performing with Rush

Peart's drumming skill and technique are well-regarded by fans, fellow musicians, and music journalists. His influences were eclectic, ranging from Pete Thomas, John Bonham, Carl Palmer, Michael Giles, Ginger Baker, Phil Collins, Chris Sharrock, Steve Gadd, Warren Cann, Stewart Copeland, Michael Shrieve and Keith Moon, to fusion and jazz drummers Billy Cobham, Buddy Rich, Bill Bruford and Gene Krupa. The Who was the first group that inspired him to write songs and play the drums.

Peart had long played matched grip but shifted to traditional as part of his style reinvention in the mid-1990s under the tutelage of jazz coach Freddie Gruber. He played traditional grip throughout his first instructional DVD A Work in Progress and on Rush's Test for Echo studio album. Peart went back to using primarily matched, though he continued to switch to traditional at times when playing songs from Test for Echo and during moments when traditional grip felt more appropriate, such as during the rudimental snare drum section of his drum solo. He discussed the details of these switches in the DVD Anatomy of a Drum Solo.

Variety wrote: "Widely considered one of the most innovative drummers in rock history, Peart was famous for his state-of-the-art drum kits—more than 40 different drums were not out of the norm—precise playing style and on-stage showmanship."

USA Today's writers compared him favourably with other top-shelf rock drummers. He was "considered one of the best rock drummers of all time, alongside John Bonham of Led Zeppelin; Ringo Starr of the Beatles; Keith Moon of the Who; Ginger Baker of Cream and Stewart Copeland of the Police." Noting that Peart was "known for his technical proficiency", the Modern Drummer Hall of Fame inducted him in 1983, making him the youngest person ever so honoured.

Music critic Amanda Petrusich in The New Yorker wrote: "Watching Peart play the drums gave the impression that he might possess several phantom limbs. The sound was merciless."

=== Equipment ===
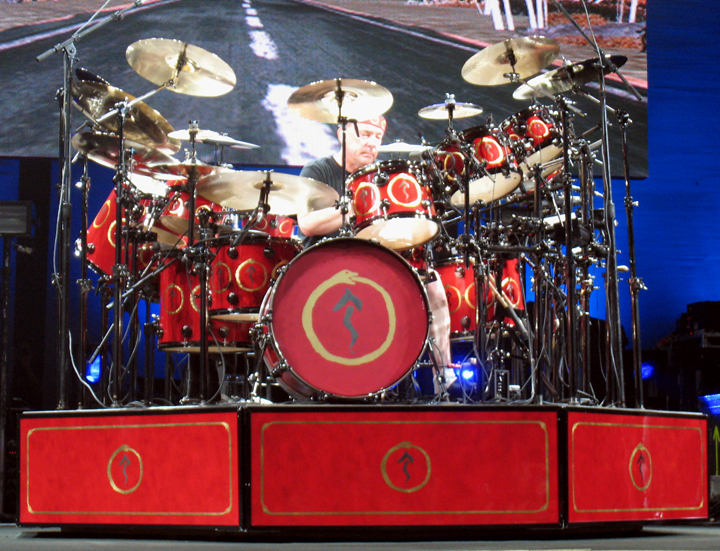
Neil Peart and his 360-degree drum kit

With Rush, Peart played Slingerland, Tama, Ludwig, and Drum Workshop drums, in that order. From 2112 to Counterparts, he used a 5 1/2 × 14 inch Slingerland "Artist" snare model (3-ply shell with 8 lugs). For the recording of Presto, he used a Ludwig and Solid Percussion piccolo snare drum.

Peart played Zildjian A-series cymbals and Wuhan china cymbals until the early 2000s, when he switched to Paragon, a line created for him by Sabian. In concert starting in 1984 on the Grace Under Pressure Tour, Peart used an elaborate 360-degree drum kit that would rotate as he played different sections of the kit.

During the late 1970s, Peart augmented his acoustic setup with diverse percussion instruments, including orchestra bells, tubular bells, wind chimes, crotales, timbales, timpani, gong, temple blocks, bell tree, triangle, and melodic cowbells. From the mid-1980s, Peart replaced several of these pieces with MIDI trigger pads. This was done in order to trigger sounds sampled from various pieces of acoustic percussion that would otherwise consume far too much stage area. Some purely electronic non-instrumental sounds were also used. One classic MIDI pad used is the MalletKAT Express, which is a two-octave electronic MIDI device that resembles a xylophone or piano. The MalletKAT Express is composed of rubber pads for the "keys" so that any stick can be used. Beginning with 1984's Grace Under Pressure, he used Simmons electronic drums in conjunction with Akai digital samplers. Peart performed several songs primarily using the electronic portion of his drum kit. (e.g. "Red Sector A", "Closer to the Heart" on A Show of Hands and "Mystic Rhythms" on R30.)

Shortly after making the choice to include electronic drums and triggers, Peart added what became another trademark of his kit: a rotating drum riser. During live Rush shows, the riser allowed Peart to swap the prominent portions of the kit (traditional acoustic in front, electronic in back). A staple of Peart's live drum solos was the in-performance rotation-and-swap of the front and back kits as part of the solo, a special effect that provided a symbolic transition of drum styles within the solo.

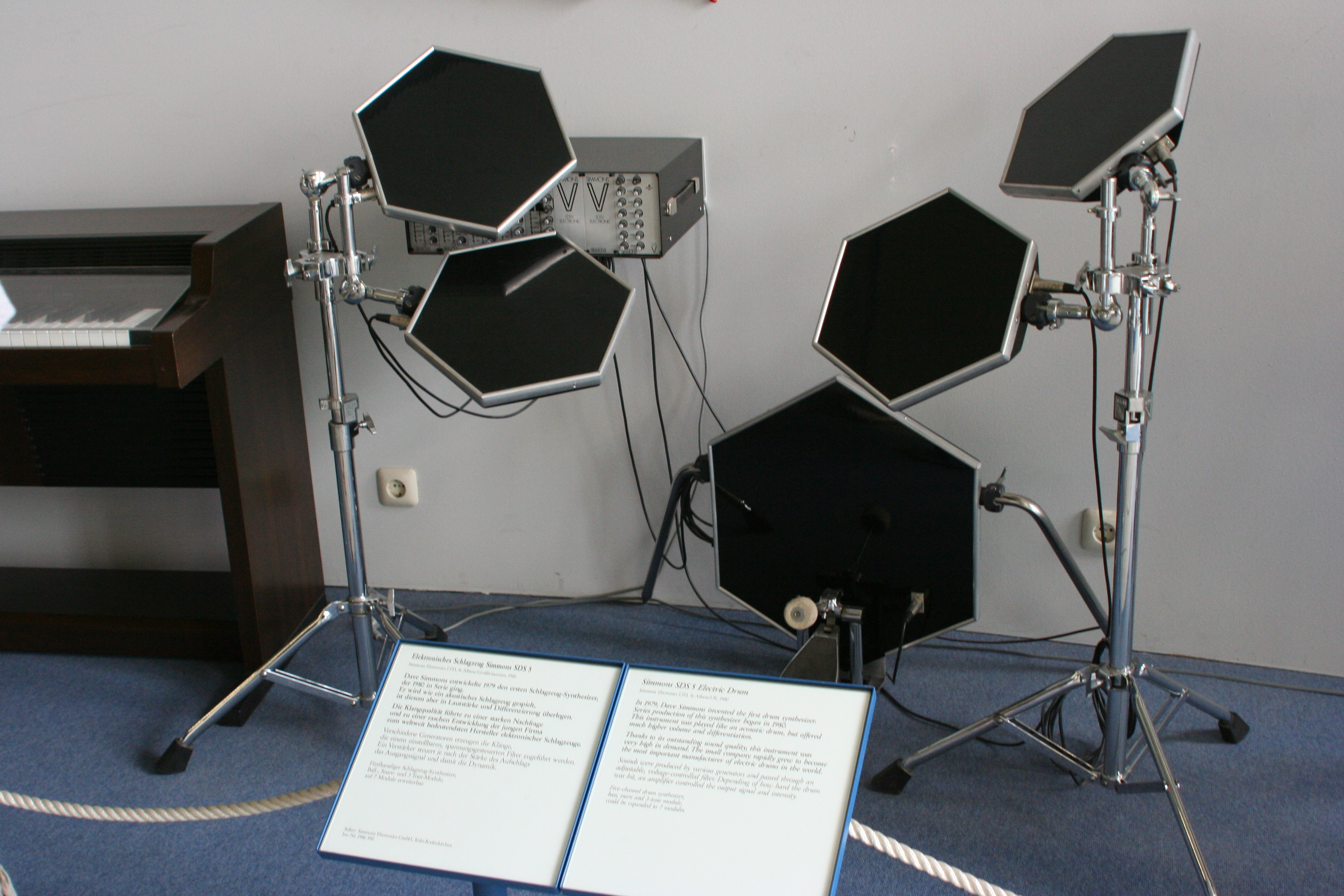
Neil Peart began incorporating electronic drums with 1984's Grace Under Pressure

In the early 2000s, Peart began taking full advantage of the advances in electronic drum technology, primarily incorporating Roland V-Drums and continued use of samplers with his existing set of acoustic percussion. His digitally sampled library of both traditional and exotic sounds expanded over the years with his music.

In April 2006, Peart took delivery of his third Drum Workshop set, configured similarly to the R30 set, in a Tobacco Sunburst finish over curly maple exterior ply, with chrome hardware. He referred to this set, which he used primarily in Los Angeles, as the "West Coast kit". Besides using it on recordings with Vertical Horizon, he played it while composing parts for Rush's album Snakes & Arrows. It featured a custom 23-inch bass drum; all other sizes remained the same as the R30 kit.

On March 20, 2007, Peart revealed that Drum Workshop prepared a new set of red-painted maple shells with black hardware and gold "Snakes & Arrows" logos for him to play on the Snakes & Arrows Tour.

Peart also designed his own signature series drumstick with Pro-Mark, the Promark PW747W, Neil Peart Signature drumsticks, made of Japanese Shira Kashi white oak.

During the 2010–11 Time Machine Tour, Peart used a new Drum Workshop kit and custom stand; the kit was outfitted with copper-plated hardware and time machine designs to match the tour's steampunk themes. Matching Paragon cymbals designed by instruments maker Rgo for Sabian in 1993 with clock imagery were also used. The drum kit and stand includes easter egg instruments that could be assembled by hand, as intended by Rgo for children, in honor of Peart.

=== Solos ===
Peart was noted for his distinctive in-concert drum solos, characterised by exotic percussion instruments and long, intricate passages in odd time signatures. His complex arrangements sometimes result in complete separation of upper- and lower-limb patterns; an ostinato dubbed "The Waltz" is a typical example. His solos were featured on every live album released by the band. On the early live albums (All the World's a Stage and Exit... Stage Left), the drum solo was included as part of a song. On all subsequent live albums through Time Machine 2011: Live in Cleveland, the drum solo has been included as a separate track. The Clockwork Angels Tour album includes three short solos instead of a single long one: two interludes played during other songs and one standalone. Similarly, the R40 Live album includes two short solos performed as interludes.

A studio recording of Peart's solo "Pieces of Eight" was released as a flexi disc exclusive in the May 1987 issue of Modern Drummer magazine. Peart's instructional DVD Anatomy of a Drum Solo (2005) is an in-depth examination of how he constructs a solo that is musical rather than indulgent, using his solo from the 2004 R30 30th anniversary tour as an example.

=== Lyricist ===
Peart was the main lyricist for Rush. Literature heavily influenced his writings. In his early days with Rush, much of his lyrical output was influenced by fantasy, science fiction, mythology, and philosophy.

The 1980 album Permanent Waves saw Peart cease to use fantasy and mythological themes. 1981's Moving Pictures showed that Peart was still interested in heroic, mythological figures, but now placed firmly in a modern, realistic context. The song "Limelight" from the same album is an autobiographical account of Peart's reservations regarding his own popularity and the pressures associated with fame. From Permanent Waves onward, most of Peart's lyrics revolved around social, emotional, and humanitarian issues, usually from an objective standpoint and employing the use of metaphors and symbolic representation.

Released in 1984, Grace Under Pressure strung together such despondent topics as the Holocaust ("Red Sector A") and the death of close friends ("Afterimage"). With 1987's Hold Your Fire, 1989's Presto, 1991's Roll the Bones, and 1993's Counterparts, Peart continued to explore diverse lyrical motifs, even addressing the topics of love and relationships ("Open Secrets", "Ghost of a Chance", "Speed of Love", "Cold Fire", "Alien Shore"), subjects which he purposefully avoided in the past out of fear of using clichés. 2002's Vapor Trails was heavily devoted to Peart's personal issues, along with other humanitarian topics such as the 9/11 terrorist attacks ("Peaceable Kingdom"). The album Snakes & Arrows dealt primarily and vociferously with Peart's opinions regarding faith and religion.

The song suite "2112" focuses on the struggle of an individual against the collectivist forces of a totalitarian state. This became the band's breakthrough release, but also brought unexpected criticism, mainly because of the credit of inspiration Peart gave to Ayn Rand in the liner notes. "There was a remarkable backlash, especially from the English press, this being the late seventies, when collectivism was still in style, especially among journalists", Peart said. "They were calling us 'Junior fascists' and 'Hitler lovers'. It was a total shock to me".

In a 1993 interview for a fan newsletter, Peart stated: "For a start, the extent of my influence by the writings of Ayn Rand should not be overstated. I am no one's disciple." The lyrics of "Faithless" exhibit a life stance which has been closely identified with secular humanism. Peart explicitly discussed his religious views in The Masked Rider: Cycling in West Africa, in which he wrote: "I'm a linear thinking agnostic, but not an atheist, folks."

In 2007, Peart was ranked No. 2 (after Sting) on the now defunct magazine Blender's list of "worst lyricists in rock". In contrast, AllMusic called him "one of rock's most accomplished lyricists".

== Personal life ==
On August 10, 1997, soon after Rush's Test for Echo Tour, Peart's 19-year-old daughter (at the time his only child) Selena Taylor was killed in a single-car crash on Highway 401 near the town of Brighton, Ontario. His common-law wife of 23 years, Jacqueline Taylor, subsequently died of cancer on June 20, 1998. Peart attributed her death to the result of a "broken heart" and called it "a slow suicide by apathy. She just didn't care."

In his book Ghost Rider: Travels on the Healing Road, Peart wrote that he told his bandmates at Jacqueline's funeral, "consider me retired". Peart took a long sabbatical to mourn and reflect, and travelled extensively throughout North and Central America on his motorcycle, covering 88,000 km (55,000 mi). After his journey, Peart returned to the band. Peart wrote the book as a chronicle of his geographical and emotional journey.

Peart was introduced to photographer Carrie Nuttall in Los Angeles by longtime Rush photographer Andrew MacNaughtan. They married on September 9, 2000. In early 2001, Peart announced to his bandmates that he was ready to return to recording and performing. The product of the band's return was the 2002 album Vapor Trails. At the start of the ensuing tour in support of the album, the band members decided that Peart would not take part in the daily grind of press interviews and "meet and greet" sessions upon their arrival in a new city that typically monopolise a touring band's daily schedule. Peart always shied away from these types of in-person encounters, and it was decided that exposing him to a lengthy stream of questions about the tragic events of his life was not necessary.

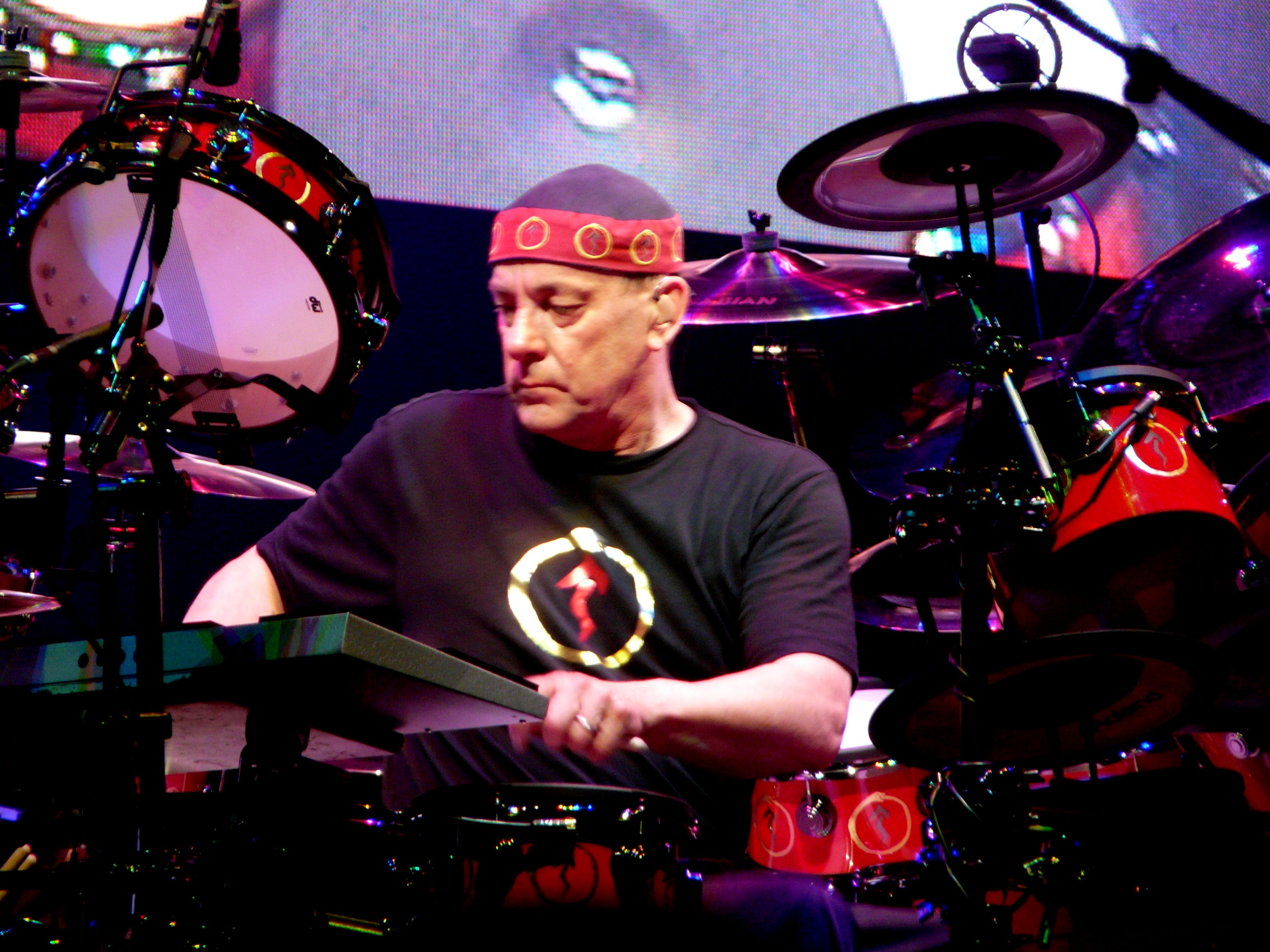
Peart performing in 2008

After the release of Vapor Trails and his reunion with his bandmates, Peart returned to work as a full-time musician. In the June 2009 edition of Peart's website's News, Weather, and Sports, titled "Under the Marine Layer", he announced that he and Nuttall were expecting their first child. Olivia Louise Peart was born later that year.

In 2014, Peart acquired U.S. citizenship.

=== Political views ===
For most of his career, Peart never publicly identified with any political party or organisation in Canada or the United States. Even so, his political and philosophical views have often been analysed through his work with Rush and through other sources. In October 1993, shortly before that year's Canadian federal election, Peart appeared with then-Liberal Party leader Jean Chrétien in an interview broadcast in Canada on MuchMusic, but stated in that interview that he was an undecided voter.

Peart has often been categorised as an Objectivist and an admirer of Ayn Rand. This is largely based on his work with Rush in the 1970s, particularly the song "Anthem" and the album 2112; the latter specifically credited Rand's work. However, in his 1994 Rush Backstage Club Newsletter, while contending the "individual is paramount in matters of justice and liberty," Peart specifically distanced himself from a strictly Objectivist line. In a June 2012 Rolling Stone interview, when asked if Rand's words still speak to him, Peart replied, "Oh, no. That was 40 years ago. But it was important to me at the time in a transition of finding myself and having faith that what I believed was worthwhile."

Although Peart was sometimes assumed to be a "Conservative" or "Republican" rock star, he criticised the U.S. Republican Party by stating that the philosophy of the party is "absolutely opposed to Christ's teachings." In 2005, he described himself as a "left-leaning libertarian", and is often cited as a libertarian celebrity.

In a 2015 interview with Rolling Stone, Peart stated that he saw the U.S. Democratic Party as the lesser evil: "For a person of my sensibility, you're only left with the Democratic party."

Peart was a member of the Canadian charity Artists Against Racism and worked with them on a radio public service announcement.

=== Death ===
Peart died from glioblastoma, an aggressive form of brain cancer, on January 7, 2020, in Santa Monica, California. He had been diagnosed three and a half years earlier, and the illness was a closely guarded secret in Peart's inner circle until his death. His family made the announcement on January 10.

From the official Rush website:

It is with broken hearts and the deepest sadness that we must share the terrible news that on Tuesday our friend, soul brother and band mate of over 45 years, Neil, has lost his incredibly brave three and a half year battle with brain cancer (Glioblastoma). We ask that friends, fans and media alike understandably respect the family's need for privacy and peace at this extremely painful and difficult time. Those wishing to express their condolences can choose a cancer research group or charity of their choice and make a donation in Neil's name.

Peart's death was widely lamented by fans and fellow musicians alike, who considered it a substantial loss for popular music.

Peart's father Glen died of cancer on June 12, 2021. Peart's brother Danny died of glioblastoma on March 13, 2025.

Neil Peart: No One's Disciple, a documentary film about Peart by Sam Dunn and Scot McFadyen, premiered at the 2026 Toronto International Film Festival. It premiered on September 23, 2026, on CBC and CBC Gem in Canada.

== Written works ==
=== Nonfiction ===
Peart authored seven non-fiction books during his lifetime, the last of which was released in 2016, as well as one that was published posthumously.

Peart's first book, titled The Masked Rider: Cycling in West Africa, was written in 1996 about a month-long bicycling tour through Cameroon in November 1988. The book details Peart's travels through towns and villages with four fellow riders. The original had a limited print run, but after the critical and commercial success of Peart's second book, Masked Rider was re-issued by ECW Press and remains in print.

After losing his wife and (at the time) only daughter, Peart embarked on a lengthy motorcycle road trip spanning North America. His experiences were penned in Ghost Rider: Travels on the Healing Road. Peart and the rest of the band were always able to keep his private life at a distance from his public image in Rush. However, Ghost Rider is a first-person narrative of Peart on the road on a BMW R1100GS motorcycle, in an effort to put his life back together as he embarked on an extensive journey.

Years later, after his marriage to Nuttall, Peart took another road trip, this time by car. In his third book, Travelling Music: Playing Back the Soundtrack to My Life and Times, he reflects on his life, his career, his family, and music. As with his previous two books, it is a first-person narrative.

Three decades after Peart joined Rush, the band found itself on its 30th anniversary tour. Released in September 2006, Roadshow: Landscape with Drums – A Concert Tour by Motorcycle details the tour both from behind Peart's drum kit and on his BMW R1150GS and R1200GS motorcycles.

Peart's next book, Far and Away: A Prize Every Time, was published by ECW Press in May 2011. This book, which he worked on for two years, is formed around his travelling in North and South America. It tells how he found in a Brazilian town a unique combination of West African and Brazilian music. In 2014, a follow-up book, Far and Near: On Days like These, was published by ECW. It covers travels in North America and Europe. His last book, Far and Wide: Bring That Horizon to Me!, was published in 2016 and is based on his travels between stops on the R40 Live Tour of 2015.

In 2024, Peart's final book, Silver Surfers: Sports Cars of the Sixties, was published posthumously, a book detailing his vintage sportscar collection.

Nonfiction works include:

- The Masked Rider: Cycling in West Africa (1996, Pottersfield Press, ISBN 1895900026)
- Ghost Rider: Travels on the Healing Road (2002, ECW Press, ISBN 1550225464)
- Traveling Music: Playing Back the Soundtrack to My Life and Times (2004, ECW Press, ISBN 1550226649)
- Roadshow: Landscape with Drums – A Concert Tour by Motorcycle (2006, Rounder Books, ISBN 1579401422)
- Far and Away: A Prize Every Time (2011, ECW Press, ISBN 978-1770410589)
- Far and Near: On Days like These (2014, ECW Press, ISBN 978-1770412576)
- Far and Wide: Bring That Horizon to Me! (2016, ECW Press, ISBN 978-1770413481)
- Silver Surfers: Sports Cars of the Sixties (2024, Insight Editions, ISBN 979-8886631005)

=== Fiction ===
Peart worked with science fiction author Kevin J. Anderson to develop a novelisation of Rush's 2012 album Clockwork Angels; the book was published by ECW Press and debuted at #18 on The New York Times hardcover fiction best seller. The two collaborated again on a loose sequel, Clockwork Lives, published in 2015, which won the 2016 Colorado Book Award in the science fiction category. Snippets of the band's lyrics can be found throughout both stories. Graphic novels of the first two Clockwork stories were created in 2015 and 2019, respectively. Peart worked with Anderson on a third and final novel during the last years of his life; after his death, his widow gave Anderson permission to continue the project. The book, Clockwork Destiny, was published by ECW Press in June 2022; like the first two novels, it incorporates portions of lyrics from Rush songs.

Fiction works include:

- "Drumbeats" with Kevin J. Anderson, short story published in Shock Rock II edited by Jeff Gelb (1994, Pocket Books, ISBN 0-671-87088-2).
  - Drumbeats (2020, WordFire Press, ISBN 978-1680571295, illustrated and expanded edition)
- Clockwork series:
  - Clockwork Angels, written by Kevin J. Anderson, based on the story and lyrics by Neil Peart (2012, ECW Press, ISBN 978-1-77041-121-0)
    - Clockwork Angels – The Graphic Novel, written by Kevin J. Anderson and Neil Peart, artwork by Nick Robles (2015, Boom! Studios, ISBN 978-1608863686)
  - Clockwork Lives with Kevin J. Anderson (2015, ECW Press, ISBN 978-1-77090-810-9)
    - Clockwork Lives – The Graphic Novel with Kevin J. Anderson (2019, Insight Editions, ISBN 978-1-68383-377-2)
  - Clockwork Destiny with Kevin J. Anderson (2022, ECW Press, ISBN 978-1-77041-651-2))

== DVDs ==
Apart from Rush's video releases as a band, Peart has released the following DVDs (the first originally in VHS tape format) as an individual:

- A Work in Progress
- Anatomy of a Drum Solo, Hudson Music, distributed by Hal Leonard (2005), ISBN 1-4234-0700-8
- The Making of Burning for Buddy (A Tribute to the Music of Buddy Rich), ASIN 0739045059
- Taking Center Stage: A Lifetime of Live Performance, distributed by Hudson Music (2011), ISBN 978-1-4584-1174-7
- Fire on Ice: The Making of the Hockey Theme, distributed by Drum Channel (2011), ASIN B00481YQPW

== Awards and honours ==
Peart received the following awards in the Modern Drummer magazine readers' poll:

- Hall of Fame: 1983
- Best Rock Drummer*: 1980, 1981, 1982, 1983, 1984, 1985, 1986, 2006, 2008
- Best Multi-Percussionist*: 1983, 1984, 1985, 1986
- Best Percussion Instrumentalist: 1982
- Most Promising New Drummer: 1980
- Best All Around: 1986
- 1986 Honor Roll: Rock Drummer, Multi-Percussion

(* – As a member of the Honor Roll in these categories, he is no longer eligible for votes in the above categories.)

- Best Instructional Video: 2006, for Anatomy of a Drum Solo
- Best Drum Recording of the 1980s, 2007, for "YYZ" from Exit... Stage Left
- Best Recorded Performance:
  - 1980: Permanent Waves
  - 1981: Moving Pictures
  - 1982: Exit... Stage Left
  - 1983: Signals
  - 1985: Grace Under Pressure
  - 1986: Power Windows
  - 1988: Hold Your Fire
  - 1989: A Show of Hands
  - 1990: Presto
  - 1992: Roll the Bones
  - 1993: Counterparts
  - 1997: Test for Echo
  - 1999: Different Stages
  - 2002: Vapor Trails
  - 2004: R30
  - 2007: Snakes & Arrows
  - 2011: Time Machine
  - 2012: Clockwork Angels

Peart received the following awards from DRUM! magazine:

- 2007: Drummer of the Year, Best Progressive Rock Drummer, Best Live Performer, Best DVD (Anatomy Of A Drum Solo), Best Drumming Album (Snakes & Arrows)
- 2008: Drummer of the Year, Best Live Drumming Performer, Best Progressive Rock Drummer (Runner-Up), Best Mainstream Pop Drummer (Runner-Up)
- 2009: Drummer Of The Year, Best Progressive Rock Drummer
- 2010: Drummer of the Year, Best Live Performer (Runner-Up), Best Progressive Rock Drummer (Runner-Up)

Other honours and awards

- Peart was made an Officer of the Order of Canada on May 9, 1996, together with Lee and Lifeson. The trio was the first rock band to be so honoured, as a group.
- Peart was inducted into the Canadian Songwriters Hall of Fame along with Lifeson and Lee in 2010.
- On April 18, 2013, Rush was inducted into the Rock and Roll Hall of Fame.
- In 2014, Peart (along with bandmates Lee and Lifeson) was awarded an Honorary Doctorate of Music from Nipissing University, recognizing the band for their "significant and lasting contribution to live music and performing arts in Canada and worldwide."
- In 2020, the St. Catharines city council named the pavilion in Lakeside Park (in Port Dalhousie, Ontario) after Peart.
- Peart was inducted into the Percussive Arts Society Hall of Fame in 2020.
- An extinct genus of frogfish named after Peart, Neilpeartia, was described in 2020

== Additional reading ==
- Rhythm & Light, Peart photographed by Carrie Nuttall (2004, Rounder Books, ISBN 1579400930)
- Taking Center Stage: A Lifetime of Live Performance by Joe Bergamini (2013, Hudson Music, ISBN 978-1458494276)
