= Making Memories (Rush song) =

- Cover art for the Canadian single release, the first-ever by Anthem Records

Single by Rush

from the album Fly By Night
- A-side: "The Temples of Syrinx" (US); "Making Memories" (CA)
- B-side: "Making Memories" (US); "The Temples of Syrinx" (CA)
- Released: February 1977 (US); August 1977 (CA)
- Recorded: December 1974
- Studio: Toronto Sound (Toronto)
- Genre: Southern rock; country; American folk rock
- Length: 2:57
- Label: Mercury (US); Anthem (CA)
- Composers: Geddy Lee; Alex Lifeson
- Lyricist: Neil Peart
- Producers: Rush; Terry Brown

Rush American 7" singles chronology
| "Lakeside Park" / "Bastille Day" (1975) | "The Temples of Syrinx" / "Making Memories" (1977) | "Fly By Night" / "In the Mood" (1976) |

Rush Canadian 7" singles chronology
| "Closer to the Heart" / "Madrigal" (1977) | "Making Memories" / "The Temples of Syrinx" (1977) | "Circumstances" / "The Trees" (1978) |

"Making Memories" is the sixth track of Fly By Night (1975), the second studio album by Canadian rock band Rush released in February 1975 by Mercury Records. A Southern rock, folk rock and country song about touring on the road, its lyrics were penned by drummer Neil Peart and its music composed by bassist and lead vocalist Geddy Lee and guitarist Alex Lifeson. The song was written while riding to a concert, when the band's car took a wrong turn. It was recorded in December 1974 at Toronto Sound, under production by the band and engineer Terry Brown.

In addition to being on Fly By Night, "Making Memories" was released in the United States in February 1977 as the B-side of a 7" single, alongside "The Temples of Syrinx"—the second movement of "2112" (1976). In August 1977, this A-side and B-side were swapped to form the first-ever release for Anthem Records. Music journalists and writers on Rush have been generally positive about "Making Memories"; their focus has been on its musical content, including its attempt at folk- and Southern rock—styles unexpected from them—as well as its solo, which utilizes slide guitar.

== Background ==
Rush's second album Fly By Night (1975) was produced by the band and audio engineer Terry Brown. New drummer Neil Peart's lyrical writing directed the group towards more philosophical and fantastical themes reflective of his interest in literature. However, the self-titled debut's Led Zeppelin style and straightforward song structures persisted alongside the progressive rock.

"Making Memories" was written in Los Angeles and St. Louis. Its lyrics were penned by Peart and its music composed by bassist and lead vocalist Geddy Lee and guitarist and founding member Alex Lifeson. "Making Memories" was the only song from the album entirely written before its December 1974 recording at Toronto Sound. Writing took place while the band was driving to their next tour destination. They took a wrong turn to the right, causing them to be off their path by a "few hours", and the acoustic guitar was the only instrument within the vehicle. A metal lipstick tube allowed Lifeson to pull off slide guitar techniques.

Fly By Night was released on February 14, 1975, by Mercury Records, "Making Memories" is its sixth track, the second on side two. On the set list of the LP's promotional tour, "Making Memories" was one of two songs not present. It was the B-side of a 1977 American release of "The Temples of Syrinx", the second movement of 2112's title epic (1976), by Mercury. It was the A-side to a 1977 Canadian single, on which "The Temples of Syrinx" was the B-side, in what was the first-ever single release from Anthem Records.

== Music ==
"Making Memories" (2:57) is a Southern rock, folk rock and country song driven by a jangly acoustic guitar. It is in D major at a moderately bright tempo in alla breve. D–F_{6}–C(add D) is the chord progression of the verses and outro, while G–D–G–D–G–D–F–C is the chord progression for the chorus. The song specifically invokes American folk, originating from its rhythm and slide guitar solo. It fades out with an improvisational jam, in which Lifeson plays several fills as Lee is "riffing his way around the words".

== Lyrics ==
"Making Memories" is about the positives and challenges of being on the road touring, "diggin' every show". It is similar to Fly By Night's title track, as both are a whimsical take on traveling. The verses argue that "there's a time for livin' as high as we can", where only marks of "our dust" would be noticeable. The locations they drive are "from sea to shining sea, and a hundred points between". The chorus concludes that "our future still looks brighter than our past" and that memories indicate that "maybe road life's not so bad", which reflects the optimism of the general album, such as songs like "Anthem". The fondness expressed in the song for being on the road contradicted Peart's unfavorable real-life attitude, upon release of Fly By Night and afterward. Alex Body, in a book on all of Rush's songs, perceived "some impression of the relentlessness of the band's workload" above the joyous surface.

== Critical reception and analysis ==
Chris Schneberger observed in 2017 that "Making Memories" was not a favorite with Rush fans. However, it has been well-received by critics, although not overwhelmingly so. AllMusic's Greg Prato called the "reflective and melodic" song an underrated early Rush piece, while Richard James thought it was "unexceptional" and the second–"most underwhelming" Fly By Night cut behind "Best I Can". It ranked 119 on a list of 167 Rush songs by Ultimate Classic Rock and 97 of 180 entries of the same by Thrillist. In the Ultimate Classic Rock list, Reed called it a "fairly pedestrian track elevated by sheer energy and virtuoso technique".

Appreciation was given towards the Southern rock style. Jeff Wagner used it as an example of Fly By Night's variety of genres, and Reed and Jordan Hoffman praised the band's attempt at a style unusual for them.Mike Segretto similarly called the end product "the kind of breezy folk-rock that Rush bashers would never expect the group could pull off". The overall song was compared to the Allman Brothers Band by Hoffman, its guitar solo to Lynyrd Skynyrd by Reed. Frequent Rush book author Martin Popoff found its folk style similar to Crosby, Stills, Nash & Young.

Coverage of "Making Memories" in reviews of Fly By Night upon its release was scarce. Ed Black, writing for The Stylus (a paper from Brockport, New York), said the song "incorporates some good acoustic and classical guitars mixed with electric lead and bass paced by maraccas [sic] and drums". "Making Memories" was a favorite of Schneberger's. He enjoyed the "very strummy intro", syncopated drum rhythm, and the "fantastic", Jimmy Page–influenced slide-heavy guitar solo. Cultural musicologist Durrell Bowman also compared it and its slide techniques to Led Zeppelin songs, such as "Ramble On" (1969) and "Gallows Pole" (1970). Alex Body was another writer to highlight the "energetic" solo.

== Personnel ==
Credits from liner notes.

Rush

- Geddy Lee – bass guitars, vocals
- Alex Lifeson – electric guitars, 6 and 12-string acoustic guitars
- Neil Peart – drums, percussion

Production

- Rush – production, arrangement, cover concept
- Terry Brown – producer, engineer, arrangement
- John Woloschuk – assistant engineer
- Gilbert Kong – mastering
