= Fly by Night (album) =

- Painting by Eraldo Carugati

Studio album by Rush
- Released: February 14, 1975
- Recorded: December 1974
- Studios: Toronto Sound (Toronto, Ontario, Canada)
- Genres: Hard rock; progressive rock
- Length: 37:38
- Label: Mercury
- Producers: Rush; Terry Brown

Rush chronology
Rush (1974)	Fly by Night (1975)	Caress of Steel (1975)

Singles from Fly by Night
- 1. "Fly by Night" Released: April 23, 1975

Fly by Night is the second studio album by the Canadian rock band Rush, released on February 14, 1975, by Mercury Records. It was the first Rush album to showcase elements of progressive rock for which the band has become known. It was also the first to feature lyricist and drummer Neil Peart, who replaced original drummer John Rutsey the previous summer just prior to the band's first North American tour. Peart took over as Rush's primary lyricist, and the abundance of fantastical and philosophical themes in his lyrics contrasted greatly with the simpler hard rock of the band's debut album. Despite the album's disappointing sales in the United States, reaching just No. 113 on the Billboard 200, it reached No. 9 on the Canadian charts; further, the album's single, "Fly by Night", enjoyed moderate success following a re-release in 1976.

== Background and recording ==
In March 1974, the Rush line-up, consisting of guitarist Alex Lifeson, drummer John Rutsey, and singer and bassist Geddy Lee, released their self-titled debut album. In the following four months, however, Rutsey fell ill following complications with diabetes and had to sit out while the group continued with a replacement, Jerry Fielding. Rutsey rejoined the group for a month of club dates before Lifeson and Lee decided it was best for Rutsey to leave due to the difficulty in managing his health on tour and musical differences between them. Lee recalled: "We were guilt-ridden at first, but we realised that it's just the way it had to be. He wasn't happy and we weren't happy".

Rush auditioned five drummers, the fourth of which was Neil Peart of a local band named J.R. Flood. The three played along to "Anthem", a song mostly written while Rutsey was in the group that Rush later recorded for Fly by Night. Lifeson and Lee were so impressed with Peart's style they felt embarrassed for the fifth drummer who had prepared by writing charts to their songs to follow. Peart joined on July 29, 1974, Lee's 21st birthday, two weeks before the band's first U.S. tour kicked off on August 14 at the Civic Arena in Pittsburgh, Pennsylvania, opening for Uriah Heep and Manfred Mann's Earth Band. By the end of the year, the group had written new material for a follow-up album.

Fly by Night was recorded during the last week of December 1974 and mixed in early January 1975 at Toronto Sound Studios during a gap in touring. Lifeson said it took around five days to record and once the mixing had finished, the group packed their cases and travelled to Winnipeg, starting their Fly By Night tour on January 15. It was the band's first album co-produced by Terry Brown who would maintain this role through to Signals (1982). Lifeson was pleased with the songs on the album and felt like it was a second beginning for the group. Lee recalled the difficulty that their label's management had in understanding the material on the album, particularly "By-Tor and the Snow Dog" as they had wanted material in the style of their debut.

== Songs ==
The band wanted each song on Fly by Night to show a different side to their writing and playing, which resulted in an album of varied styles. As Peart was a keen reader, he became the group's primary lyricist, which suited Lifeson and Lee because they preferred to write music. A Rolling Stone article reasoned this shift in roles to the "massive" difference in the lyrical styles between their first album and Fly by Night which contains more literary themes and references. The songs "By-Tor and the Snow Dog" and "Rivendell" are examples of the inclusion of fantasy themes into Rush's music. The original hand-penned lyrics for "Anthem" and "Fly by Night" include different or additional lyrics not sung in the final recording, including a prologue for the latter. The tracks "Best I Can" and "In the End" were written before Peart joined the band, and were performed regularly during Rush's first North American tour.

=== Side one ===
"Anthem" originated by Lifeson and Lee while Rutsey was still in the band and features a heavier sound with more complex arrangements than previous Rush tracks. Peart named the track and its lyrics after the same-titled dystopian novella by Russian-American writer and philosopher Ayn Rand, who would become a greater inspiration to lyrics on their later album 2112 (1976).

The lyrics to "Beneath, Between and Behind" were the first that Peart wrote for Rush. Lee and Lifeson wrote the music after he had finished, the reverse of the process they used for most of the rest of the album.

The eight-minute "By-Tor and the Snow Dog" is arranged in eight distinct sections and marked a key point in the development of the group's songwriting. (Note: Contrary to long-time general belief and several music publications claiming so, "By-Tor and The Snow Dog", although Rush's first science fiction fantasy epic, is not their first rock suite; the debut album featured the two-movement suite "Before and After".) The first part, "At the Tobes of Hades", remained a mystery to the group years later in regard to its meaning, which is what Peart liked about the track in particular: "But it's something that my friend's father used to say: 'It's hotter than the Tobes of Hades!'" It is a good versus evil fantasy song that originated from two dogs owned by Rush's manager Ray Danniels which their lighting man Howard Ungerleider named Biter and Snow Dog. Lee later said: "We must have been high one day, imagining a song about these two dogs. And then Neil went ahead and wrote it" which had the two characters fight with Snow Dog emerging victorious. He later deemed the track "a joke that got out of control". On the original vinyl release, the chimes at the end continue into a locked groove, and thus plays indefinitely on manual record players. The song "The Necromancer" from their following album Caress of Steel (1975) was described by Peart as the "mythological sequel" to "By-Tor and the Snow Dog."

=== Side two ===
"Fly by Night" is based on Peart's experience of moving from Canada to London as a young musician before joining Rush.

"Making Memories" came about after the band had taken a wrong turn on a drive. Lifeson proceeded to write a tune on his acoustic guitar, and had a fully arranged piece by the time the band had entered the studio to record.

"Rivendell" is a slower ballad, named after the fictional Elven settlement in The Lord of the Rings legendarium by J. R. R. Tolkien.

== Release and reception ==
Professional ratings
Review scores
Source	Rating
AllMusic	3/5 stars
Collector's Guide to Heavy Metal	6/8
The Encyclopedia of Popular Music	2/5 stars
The Essential Rock Discography	6/10
MusicHound Rock	2.5/5 stars
Music Emissions	4/5 stars
The Rolling Stone Album Guide	2/5 stars
The Virgin Encyclopedia of 80s Music	2/5 stars

Fly by Night was released in February 1975 and reached No. 9 in Canada and No. 113 on the U.S. Billboard 200. The album was released in April 1975 in Europe. The title track was released as a single in April 1975, reaching No. 45 in Canada. By October 1975, the album had sold 110,000 copies. The original vinyl pressings contained an inner sleeve of photographs and handwritten lyrics by Peart.

Rush supported the album with a U.S. and Canadian tour that covered more than 70 cities from January 15 to June 29, 1975, opening for Kiss and Aerosmith. They performed their first major headline shows across Canada, including a sold-out gig at Massey Hall in Toronto for 4,000 people.

In a review for Statesville Record & Landmark, Pam Simon thought the album "is a strange schizophrenic album, almost evenly divided between second-rate acoustic music and the dated concept of the power-trio format". She was critical of their "heavy-metal material [which] tends toward highly pretentious compositions with epic overtones." Simon picked out "By-Tor and the Snow Dog" as such an example which she called "especially horrendous". Though Simon praised Lifeson's "more than competent" guitar work and Peart's drumming, she criticised Lee's "mediocre" voice for sounding too similar to Robert Plant. Michael Dology in RPM Weekly wrote the album is "a loud but sensitive excursion into ball-blaster rock/roll". Greg Prato of AllMusic said that the album was less straightforward than their debut album, and while it was not one of their best albums, it was one of their most important because it heralded the band's new direction.

Ultimate Classic Rock included the album on their list of the "Top 100 '70s Rock Albums", writing "Neil Peart wasn't just the new drummer; he was the spark that pushed them to greatness."

== Reissues ==
A remaster was issued in 1997. It was remastered again in 2011 by Andy VanDette as part of the three-volume "Sector" box sets, which re-released all of Rush's Mercury-era albums. In addition to the standard audio CD, the album was also included on an audio DVD in the Sector 1 set, remixed into 5.1 surround sound.

The complete album, along with the self-titled debut and Caress of Steel, was included as part of the 1978 Anthem release Archives.

Fly By Night was remastered for vinyl in 2015 by Sean Magee at Abbey Road Studios as a part of the official "12 Months of Rush" promotion. The high definition master prepared for this release was also made available for purchase in 24-bit/96 kHz and 24-bit/192 kHz formats, at several high-resolution audio online music stores. These masters have less compression than the 1997 remasters and the "Sector" remasters by Andy VanDette.

== Track listing ==
All lyrics written by Neil Peart, except where noted.

Side one
No.	Title	Lyrics	Music	Length
1.	"Anthem"		Geddy Lee, Alex Lifeson	4:21
2.	"Best I Can"	Lee	Lee	3:24
3.	"Beneath, Between and Behind"		Lifeson	3:01
4.	"By-Tor and the Snow Dog" I. "At the Tobes of Hades" (0:36) II. "Across the Styx" (0:35) III. "Of the Battle" (6:23) i. "Challenge and Defiance" (2:43) ii. "7/4 War Furor" (0:37) iii. "Aftermath" (1:58) iv. "Hymn of Triumph" (1:05) IV. "Epilogue" (1:04)		Lee, Lifeson	8:37

Side two
No.	Title	Lyrics	Music	Length
1.	"Fly by Night"		Lee	3:18
2.	"Making Memories"		Lee, Lifeson	2:58
3.	"Rivendell"		Lee	4:52
4.	"In the End"	Lee	Lee, Lifeson	6:44

== Personnel ==
Credits are adapted from the album's liner notes.

Rush

- Geddy Lee – bass guitars, classical guitar, vocals, "By-Tor"
- Alex Lifeson – electric guitars, 6- and 12-string acoustic guitars, "Snow Dog"
- Neil Peart – drums, percussion

Production

- Rush – production, arrangements, cover concept
- Terry Brown – production, arrangements, engineering, mixing
- John Woloschuk – assistant engineer
- Gilbert Kong at Masterdisk – original mastering
- Eraldo Carugati – cover painting
- Richard Fegley – photography
- Jim Ladwig – art direction
- AGI Chicago – art direction
- Joe Kotleba – design
- Howard "Herns" Ungerleider – "By-Tor" characters inspiration
- Ray Danniels and Vic Wilson, SRO Productions – management
- Moon Records – executive production

== Charts ==
Chart (1975)	Peak position
Canada Top Albums/CDs (RPM)	9
US Billboard 200	113

== Certifications ==
Region	Certification	Certified units/sales
Canada (Music Canada)	Platinum	100,000^{^}
United States (RIAA)	Platinum	1,000,000^{^}
^{^} Shipments figures based on certification alone.
