= Working Man =

Song by Rush

from the album Rush
- Released: March 1974
- Recorded: 1973
- Genre: Hard rock
- Length: 7:06; 7:10 (Remastered version); 7:15 (Vault edition)
- Label: Moon; Anthem/Mercury
- Songwriters: Alex Lifeson; Geddy Lee
- Producer: Rush

Audio sample
- "Working Man": file; help

"Working Man" is a song by Canadian rock band Rush. In an interview on the Rolling Stone YouTube channel, bassist and lead vocalist Geddy Lee said that "Working Man" is his favorite song to play live. "Working Man" became a favourite among Rush fans; the guitar solo appeared on Guitar World magazine's 100 Greatest Guitar Solos list.

== Release and reception ==
Donna Halper, then a disc jockey and music director at WMMS in Cleveland, Ohio, is credited with getting Rush noticed in the United States by playing "Working Man" on the air. The song proved particularly popular in the working-class city. The response resulted in a record deal for the band, who gave her special thanks for her part in their early history and dedicated their first two albums to her.

Two versions of the song are available as downloadable tracks for the music video game series Rock Band. One is a cover based on the original recording, while the other is a previously unreleased master track with an alternate guitar solo. The alternate version proved so popular that the band released it on the iTunes Store, under the title "Working Man (Vault Edition)".

== Cultural references ==
The song is featured in episodes of the television series, Fargo, Wayne (TV series), My Name is Earl, That '70s Show, Supernatural, American Dad!, the 2011 film Goon, and a 2014 Walmart television advertisement.

Major League Baseball player Pete Alonso of the New York Mets uses the song as his walk up song.

== Personnel ==
- Geddy Lee – bass, lead vocals
- Alex Lifeson – guitar
- John Rutsey – drums

== Notable covers ==
- Danielle Armstrong covered "Working Man" for the opening credits of Transporter: The Series. This version was arranged by Jamie Forsyth.
- Thirteenth season American Idol contestant Caleb Johnson performed this song during the Top 12 round, and was met with moderate reviews from the judges.

== See also ==
- List of songs recorded by Rush
