= Before and After (Rush song) =

"Before" and "After"

Song by Rush

from the album Rush
- Released: March 18, 1974
- Recorded: 1973
- Genre: Folk ("Before"); Hard rock; boogie rock; heavy metal ("After")
- Length: 5:33; 2:17 ("Before"); 3:16 ("After")
- Label: Moon
- Composers: Geddy Lee; Alex Lifeson
- Lyricist: Geddy Lee
- Producer: Rush

Rush suite chronology
"Before" and "After" (1974)	"By-Tor and The Snow Dog" (1975)

Rush instrumental chronology
"Before" (1974)	"Of the Battle" (1975)

"Before"/"After", stylized on the sleeve's tracklisting as "Before" and "After", is a two-piece suite by Canadian rock band Rush. With John Rutsey as drummer, the suite was composed by bassist and lead vocalist Geddy Lee and guitarist Alex Lifeson and penned by Lee. It is the seventh track on the band's 1974 self-titled debut album, released by Moon Records. Thrillist ranked the suite the 35th best all-time Rush song in 2019, while Ultimate Classic Rock placed it 129th in 2018.

Retrospective journalists described "Before" and "After"'s song structure as an indicator of Rush's output following the first album, where Neil Peart was drummer and the prominent lyricist. "Before" is an acoustic guitar-driven folk instrumental ballad that gradually builds up then abruptly goes into "After". The second movement is a much more aggressive hard rock power ballad featuring the heavy metal boogie rock style and relationship subject matter of the album's other tracks.

== Background ==
Rush (1974), the Canadian rock band's self-titled debut studio album, was recorded and mixed in two periods of sessions in 1973. The first was two days in the summer at Studio B of Toronto's Eastern Sound under production of David Stock, the second in November at the Terry Brown-owned Toronto Sound for three days. As with all other Rush songs, the lyrics for "Before"/"After" were hastily written on site at Eastern Sound by Rush's bassist and lead vocalist Geddy Lee. This was a consequence of drummer John Rutsey, who was initially tasked with writing lyrics. He tore them up by the day he was supposed to submit, which was the second day at Eastern Sound. The track was first recorded at Eastern Sound with overdubs tracked during the Toronto Sound sessions. The album was released on March 18, 1974, by Moon Records in Canada. "Before"/"After" was the seventh track, its name stylized as "Before" and "After" on the tracklisting.

== Music ==
"Before" and "After"
The folk instrumental "Before" transitioning into the sung heavy metal boogie rock "After". The music calms down before the electric guitar gets louder and the track suddenly shifts into "After".

The introductory "Before" section is an acoustic guitar-driven folk instrumental ballad that serves as Rush's only song with a tone critics labeled "beautiful", "lush", and "non-rocker". It gradually builds up to a "dreamy apogee" before suddenly transitioning to "After". "Before" starts with phased guitar arpeggios and harmonic sounds, such as a bell sound made by only touching the fret. At 1:11, a distorted guitar begins playing the chord progression and the bass guitar takes a melodic role. The song gets calmer at 1:48, with "interplay" between the bass and cymbals, before the electric guitar gets louder and a snare rolls.

"After" is a "chugging", aggressive, and anthemic hard rock power ballad featuring the other album tracks' heavy metal boogie rock style. "After" plays at a moderately bright tempo in alla breve and A mixolydian mode. All of its four verses follow the chord progression of A–G–D repeated six times, then two measures in B before following A–G–D again twice. The chord progression of the chorus, involving the singing of four "Yeah"s, is C–D–B♭–A. A breakdown emphasizing the simple drum pattern, which starts at 3:16, is accompanied by quick bursts of a guitar riff and a lead guitar line filling in the gaps. The song climaxes with Lee stressing his final "yeah" while drenched in delay and reverb.

== Lyrics ==
"After"'s lyrics are also usual for the album, the subject feuding with their partner while pleading to save the relationship. Its themes of communication issues and a partner causing heartbreak reflect the songs of Led Zeppelin, Aerosmith and Kiss. The latter two acts released their debut albums between 1973 and 1974, a time period where Rush were opening acts for both bands. There is also a sentiment of carpe diem seen in the band's other early songs written by Lee and John Rutsey. Other examples include album opener "Finding My Way", "Best I Can", and "Garden Road". Paul Thomas Webb suggested this originated from both musicians' fathers dying of heart failure during their childhoods.

== Reception and legacy ==
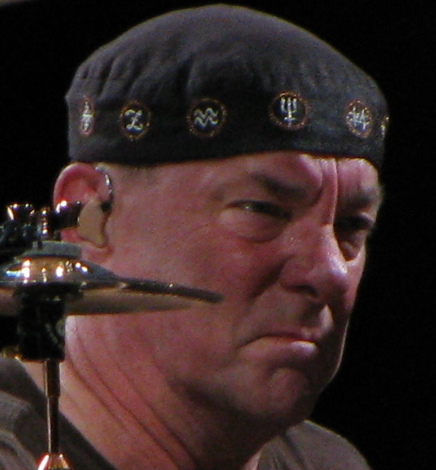
"Before" and "After" is considered by retrospective writers the self-titled album's only indicator of the style and songwriting of Rush's later music, where Neil Peart (pictured in 2010) was lyricist and drummer.

Discussion of "Before" and "After" was non-existent in contemporaneous reviews of Rush, its only mention as a best-cut in a Billboard review. The only recorded live performance of "Before" and "After" currently available took place at Laura Secord Secondary School in 1974. It, along with seven other filmed performances at that location, was released on a bonus Blu-ray and DVD for the R40 box set (2014). On the set list of Rush's first American tour, which lasted three months and was also the first with Neil Peart, "Before" and "After" was the only Rush song absent. The song, however, was covered in retrospective reviews, and positively. A 2024 PopMatters review called it Rush's most "sophisticated" track. Ultimate Classic Rock ranked it the 129th best of Rush's 167 studio album songs in 2018, while Thrillist placed it 35 out of all of the band's 180.

Journalists writing about the band and progressive rock consider "Before" and "After", especially "Before", the only Rush song representative of their output that began with Peart's replacement of Rutsey. This is in its complex structure with a "quieter" and "ethereal" lengthy intro that uses the bass guitar for melody and grows, before an abrupt sound and tempo change. According to Popoff, Rutsey's drumming activity during "After" was close to that of Rush's early Peart songs. James Richard, Alex Body, and Ryan Reed preferred "Before" over "After". Richard argued "Before" had "creativity and melodic strength" not present in "After", and Reed called "Before" a nice touch to an overall "plodding" blues suite.

However, "After" was not without praise for its musical content. Jordan Hoffman called it a "solid" blues song. Although Body was disappointed the lyrics were "more of the same", he highlighted its guitar work. "The unison riffs are particularly pronounced here, weaving around Lee's vocals expertly," he wrote. He also called the solo during the breakdown Lifeson's "best Jimmy Page impression and, in some ways surprisingly, it really works". The_Phoenician, a writer for Ultimate Guitar, called the overall experience "ridiculous[ly] powerful" thanks to "After", which "kick[s] ass". He called Lifeson's guitar work exceptional and Rutsey's drum groove "serious"; in addition, "Geddy Lee letting it rip without restraint sounds very refreshing." He placed the suite on his list of the "Top 7 Underrated Rush Masterpieces That Everyone Should Check Out".

== Parts ==
No.	Title	Starts at (approx.)	Length
1.	"Before"	0:00	2:17
2.	"After"	2:17	3:16
Total length:			5:33

== Personnel ==
Rush

- Geddy Lee – lead vocals, bass
- Alex Lifeson – electric and acoustic guitars, backing vocals
- John Rutsey – drums, percussion, backing vocals

Technical personnel

- David Stock – engineer
- Terry Brown – engineer, remix
- Gilbert Kong – mastering
- Jim Shelton – mastering consultant
