= Moon Records =

Moon Records may refer to:

- Moon Records Ukraine, a Ukrainian record label
- Moon Records (Canada), a former Canadian record label (1973–1974) mainly for Rush
- Moon Records (Japan), a Japanese record label; see Tatsuro Yamashita
- Moon Ska Records, a former American record label
