= The Negatones =

The Negatones is a Brooklyn, New York based band, founded by siblings Jay Braun (vocals, guitar, synthesizers) and Justin Braun (vocals, bass, synthesizers) with Jun Takeshta (guitar, synthesizers, vocals, mallet instruments) and Jesse Wallace (drums, electronic drums, percussion, vocals).

== Sound ==
The Negatones have developed a unique, genre-crossing style that often features frenetic performances and recordings. Their sound combines elements of rock and roll, progressive rock, electronica, glitch, blaxploitation, metal, and punk. In step with their stylistic dichotomies, they are known for both championing analog gear such as Moog synthesizers and magnetic tape recorders, as well as forging unmistakably digital mixes using the nonlinear computer recording platform Pro Tools. Using the benefits of combined analog and digital recording techniques, their songs often feature dense and busy orchestrations of traditional rock instruments performing live, layered with synthesizers, Beatle-esque harmonies, electronics, percussion, and occasionally a horn section. Jay Braun credits Latin-style Big Band, Electronica, and The Beatles as strong influences on the Negatones' busy and frenetic mixes. This heavily edited and densely layered style is also used on production and mixes by Jay for other artists (see releases with other artists).

== History ==
The Brauns formed the Negatones in 1997 following stints playing local shows and touring internationally in several other NYC bands. Former high school classmate Jun Takeshta moved from Tokyo to New York City to join the Negatones after receiving a demo tape from the Brauns in the mail.

A noted anomaly amongst the Music of New York City, they have remained largely independent and defiant of local band trends yet maintain a loyal following, receive substantial broadcasts (both radio and podcasts) and enjoy regular press mention ranging from Spin Magazine and The Village Voice to a front-page feature in The New York Times. The final episode of Dr. Katz features an animated thug wearing a Negatones T-shirt.

After releasing several self-recorded CDs, the Negatones have collectively or individually recorded and/or mixed works for many major label and independent artists and have sporadically toured and/or played with a broad range of local performers including Adam Green, Band of Susans, and Mooney Suzuki. Most recently the Braun brothers were recruited by ex Fiery Furnace Toshi Yano to work on his new project, Kapow. Additionally, the Braun Brothers have also separately worked with Fiery Furnace siblings Matt and Eleanor Friedberger on two covers for Clash and Junior Kimbrough compilations.

Avid Rush fans, the Negatone's eponymous debut full-length CD featured cover art by Paul Weldon, who did the cover art for Rush's self-titled debut album 30 years prior.

== Releases ==
- The Heavy E.P. (2002)
- Snacktronica E.P. (2003) reprinted (2004)
- The Negatones (2005) -editor's pick: No. 8 Best Album of 2005 - Time Out New York

with other artists:

- Logic Will Break Your Heart the Stills (2003) Featuring the single 'Still In Love Song' recorded by Jay Braun in the Negatones rehearsal studio. Conceived as a demo, the Stills liked the vibe of the track so much they released it as their first single on their Atlantic Records debut.
- Damage the Jon Spencer Blues Explosion (2004) Featuring the instrumental track 'Rivals' produced and mixed by Jay Braun with performances by Jay Braun synthesizers and string samples, Jesse Wallace conga
- Snack Cracker the Jon Spencer Blues Explosion (2005) Japan-only release featuring 'Hot Gossip J Braun Remix' a low-fi remix of a song from 'Damage' featuring Chuck D produced and mixed by Jay Braun and featuring performances by the entire Negatones: Jay Braun Moog, Justin Braun bass, Jun Takeshta vibraphone, Jesse Wallace percussion
- Men Without Pants Dan the Automator, Russell Simins (2006) Jay Braun contributed mixing, writing, and several instruments, Justin Braun and Jesse Wallace play bass and percussion respectively on several tracks.
- The Walking Hellos The Walking Hellos, (2006) Jay Braun recorded, mixed, and co-produced several tracks on this debut ep. He is currently working with the band on their follow-up full-length.
