= Paul Weldon =

- Born: Paul Stanford Weldon; March 4, 1936; Toronto, Ontario, Canada
- Died: January 2, 2025 (aged 88); Toronto, Ontario, Canada
- Occupations: Musician; architect; graphic artist
- Musical career
- Genres: Pop rock
- Instruments: Keyboard; bass
- Member of: Edward Bear

Paul Stanford Weldon (March 4, 1936 – January 2, 2025) was a Canadian musician, architect and graphic artist from Toronto, Ontario.

Weldon was a founding member of the Canadian band Edward Bear, which had Top 5 hits in Canada and charted well in the United States and worldwide. Weldon was a keyboardist and bass player for Edward Bear, and that band's '70s albums featured his cover art. Weldon continued to play in the Toronto area as of 2010.

Weldon's work designing album art spanned over 30 years and several genres including classic rock, 70s funk, and modern cult-indie rock. Weldon designed a large percentage of the album covers released in Canada between 1971 and 1974. Weldon's work includes cover art for the 1972 release of Funkadelic's America Eats Its Young. His cover work for Rush's 1974 eponymous debut album would lead, thirty years later, to the Rush-influenced NYC indie-rockers The Negatones commissioning Weldon to do the cover art for their 2005 eponymous debut LP, which bears a similarity to the original Rush record.

Weldon's designs often incorporated found materials (comic book clippings, dollar bills, science photos) into his artwork.

Weldon died of pneumonia on January 2, 2025, at Toronto General Hospital. He was 88 years old. A celebration of his life, including a screening of his movie, was held on March 29, 2025.
