= Rush (Rush album) =

1974 studio album by Rush

- Cover art by Paul Weldon

Studio album by Rush
- Released: March 18, 1974
- Recorded: Summer & November 1973
- Studios: Eastern Sound and Toronto Sound (Toronto, Ontario, Canada)
- Genres: Hard rock; blues rock; boogie rock
- Length: 39:51
- Label: Moon
- Producer: Rush

Rush chronology
Rush (1974)	Fly by Night (1975)

Singles from Rush
- 1. "Finding My Way" Released: August 1974; 2. "In the Mood" Released: December 1974

Rush is the debut studio album by Canadian rock band Rush. It was released on March 18, 1974 in Canada by Moon Records, the band's own label, before being re-released internationally by Mercury Records later that year. Recorded five years after the band's formation, it is their only album to feature original drummer John Rutsey and displays a more straightforward hard rock sound than they would come to be known for, showing the influence of early British hard rock bands, particularly Led Zeppelin and Humble Pie.

== Recording and production ==
"Working Man"
"Working Man" from Rush.

The initial recordings were produced and engineered by David Stock at Eastern Sound Studios in Toronto in three sessions during the summer of 1973. The sessions ran through the night after gigs, taking advantage of the studio's 'dead time', charged at a quarter of the usual rate. The band laid down all the basic tracks on the first night, playing together live. On the second night they added vocals and guitar overdubs. Stock mixed the whole album in around two hours on the third, without the band present.

At the request of their management, SRO, they included their version of Buddy Holly's "Not Fade Away", a staple of their live set and also the Rolling Stones' first Canadian hit, as a possible single release. SRO then formed their own label, Moon Records, and released the song as Rush's debut single in September 1973 (catalogue number MN 001), backed with "You Can't Fight It", another song originally planned for inclusion on the album.

However, the band was unhappy with the quality of the recordings, so SRO found enough money to book three days at Toronto Sound Studios in November 1973 to partially re-record and entirely remix the album with engineer and co-owner Terry Brown. Now producing themselves, the band achieved a significant improvement in sound quality, despite the fact that both studios only had 8-track tape machines, quite primitive for 1973. They added new overdubs to the existing backing tracks for "What You're Doing", "Before and After" and "Working Man" from the first sessions and recorded three new songs from scratch: "Finding My Way", "Need Some Love" and "Here Again", which took the place of "Not Fade Away" and "You Can't Fight It".

Drummer John Rutsey had been the band's primary lyricist and was working on lyrics for the album, but a crisis of confidence at the last minute meant that he did not show up at the vocal session at Eastern Sound, later saying that he had torn up the words he had written. This left vocalist/bassist Geddy Lee and guitarist Alex Lifeson to compose the final lyrics at very short notice based on the makeshift lyrics which Lee had been improvising at gigs, creating bad feeling and widening the rift which was already forming between Rutsey and his bandmates over musical direction. This rift, along with his Type 1 diabetes which limited his ability to travel, eventually led to Rutsey leaving the band in July 1974, a month before their first American tour. Neil Peart joined Rush on July 29th, Lee's 21st birthday, and served as drummer and primary lyricist on all of their subsequent albums.

== Release and distribution ==
In the continued absence of any major label interest, SRO decided to release the album themselves on their Moon Records label. It was mastered at Sterling Sound in New York City and released in Canada only on March 18, 1974, catalogue number MN-100. Only 3,500 copies were pressed. The promotional version of the LP had a cream-coloured label with a blue Moon Records logo and black type, while the remaining 3,500 had a light blue label with a dark blue Moon Records logo and black type.

The album was soon picked up by WMMS, a radio station in Cleveland, Ohio. Donna Halper, a DJ working at the station, selected "Working Man" for her regular playlist. Every time the song was played the station received phone calls asking where to buy the record. Copies of the Moon Records album were imported to the Cleveland area and quickly sold out. In the 2010 documentary film Rush: Beyond the Lighted Stage, Halper says that "Working Man" was the perfect song for the Cleveland rock audience, as it was still mostly a factory town in 1974. WMMS later sponsored a show for the band in Cleveland on June 28, their second-ever US performance. (Their first was a few weeks earlier in East Lansing, Michigan.)

The record's popularity in Cleveland brought it to the attention of young Mercury Records executive Cliff Burnstein, leading to the band signing an international deal with them. The album was remastered by Gilbert Kong at Masterdisk in NYC and re-released for the US-market in July 1974, only a few weeks before the start of their first US-tour. "A special thank you to Donna Halper for getting the ball rolling" was added to the credits of this and all later versions. In February 1975, Mercury released the album in Europe.

The first Canadian Mercury re-release on the standard red Mercury label is nearly as rare as the Moon version and still had the Moon catalogue number, MN-100, between the run-out grooves, indicating that it was pressed from the same metal stampers as the Moon disc.

The original Moon Records version of the album cover, designed by Paul Weldon, had a red Rush logo, but a printing error by Mercury Records made it appear more magenta in colour on North American and some other pressings. This went largely uncorrected until the 2014 reissue. It is one of two Rush albums where the cover artwork suffered from major printing errors, the other being Caress of Steel from the following year.

The complete album, along with Fly by Night and Caress of Steel, was re-issued as part of the 1978 budget 3-record set Archives.

In July 2008, Rush discovered a version of "Working Man" with an alternative guitar solo, which they released online. They also allowed the makers of the popular video game Rock Band to include the song.

== Critical reception ==
Professional ratings
Review scores
Source	Rating
AllMusic	2/5 stars
Classic Rock	4.5/5 stars
Collector's Guide to Heavy Metal	7/8
The Encyclopedia of Popular Music	2/5 stars
The Essential Rock Discography	6/10
MusicHound Rock	2/5 stars
The Rolling Stone Album Guide	2/5 stars
The Virgin Encyclopedia of 80s Music	2/5 stars

Rush received positive reviews upon its 1974 release. Writing for the Ottawa Citizen, Bill Provick gave praise on the band's "immediate acceleration" and "driving, crisp sound", although he felt that "the energy needs a bit more channeling and the arrangements need a touch more refining". Billboard wrote that it "serves up a dose of good hard rock highlighted by the often Robert Plant-like lead vocals of Geddy Lee and the powerful guitar work of Alex Lifeson and solid drumming from John Rutsey."

However, critical reception in later years has been more negative. Greg Prato of AllMusic stated in his review of the album that it was weaker than some of the band's later works, such as Hemispheres and Moving Pictures, because Neil Peart was not yet a part of the band. He finished his review by saying, "While longtime Rush fans can appreciate their debut because they never returned to this style, newcomers should stick with their classics from later years."

== Remasters ==
A CD remaster was issued in 1997. The tray has a picture of the star with man painting (mirroring the cover art of Retrospective I) with "The Rush Remasters" printed in all capital letters just to the left. All remasters from Rush through Permanent Waves are like this.

Rush was remastered again in 2011 by Andy VanDette for the "Sector" box sets, which re-released all of Rush's Mercury-era albums. The album is included in the Sector 1 set.

The album was remastered and re-released on vinyl in April 2014 as part of a box set to celebrate its 40th anniversary. The 2014 vinyl version included a replica of the original Moon Records label on the LP.

Rush was remastered for vinyl in 2015 as a part of the official "12 Months of Rush" promotion. The high definition master prepared for this release was also made available for purchase in 24-bit/96 kHz and 24-bit/192 kHz formats, at several high-resolution audio online music stores. These masters have significantly less dynamic range compression than the 1997 remasters and the "Sector" remasters by Andy VanDette.

== Track listing ==
All songs written by Geddy Lee and Alex Lifeson, except "Need Some Love" (lyrics written by Lee and John Rutsey), (Note: Although the sleeve credits Lee and Lifeson as writers of "Need Some Love", Lifeson admitted in a 2011 MusicRadar interview Rutsey and Lee wrote the lyrics.) and "In the Mood", written solely by Lee.

Side one
No.	Title	Length
1.	"Finding My Way"	5:03
2.	"Need Some Love"	2:16
3.	"Take a Friend"	4:27
4.	"Here Again"	7:30

Side two
No.	Title	Length
1.	"What You're Doing"	4:19
2.	"In the Mood"	3:36
3.	"Before" (2:17) and "After" (3:16) ( (Note: "Before"/"After" is the actual name of the track, in Lee's handwritten lyrical sheet. On the album sleeve, it was stylized as "Before" and "After".))	5:33
4.	"Working Man"	7:07

== Personnel ==
Rush

- Geddy Lee – lead vocals, bass
- Alex Lifeson – guitar, backing vocals
- John Rutsey – drums, percussion, backing vocals

Production

- Rush – production, arrangements
- Terry Brown – engineering, remixing (Toronto Sound)
- David Stock – engineering (Eastern Sound)
- Sterling Sound – mastering (Moon release)
- Gilbert Kong at Masterdisk – mastering (original Mercury release)
- BIC Photography – photography
- Paul Weldon – design
- Ray Danniels and Vic Wilson – management
- SRO Productions – executive production

== Release history ==
Overview of release formats for Rush
Country	Label	Format	Catalog	Year
Canada	Moon	Vinyl	MN 100	1974
Canada & US	Mercury	Vinyl	SRM 1-1011	1974
Canada	Anthem	Vinyl	ANR 1-1011	1977
US	Mercury	CD	534623	1987
Canada	Anthem	CD	ANC 1-1001	
Canada	Anthem	CD	WANK 1001	
Canada	Anthem	CD	ANMD 1001	
Canada	Anthem	CD	ANMD 1075	1997
Canada & US	Mercury	8 Track	MC8 1-1011	1974
Canada	Anthem	8 Track	8AN 1-1001	1977
Canada & US	Mercury	Cassette	MC4 1-1011	1974
Canada	Anthem	Cassette	4AN 1-1001	
Canada	Anthem	Cassette	4AN 1-106	

== Charts ==
Chart performance for Rush
Chart (1974)	Peak position
Canada Top Albums/CDs (RPM)	86
US Billboard 200	105

== Certifications ==
Certifications for Rush
Region	Certification	Certified units/sales
Canada (Music Canada)	Gold	50,000^{^}
United States (RIAA)	Gold	500,000^{^}
^{^} Shipments figures based on certification alone.
