= Donna Halper =

American historian

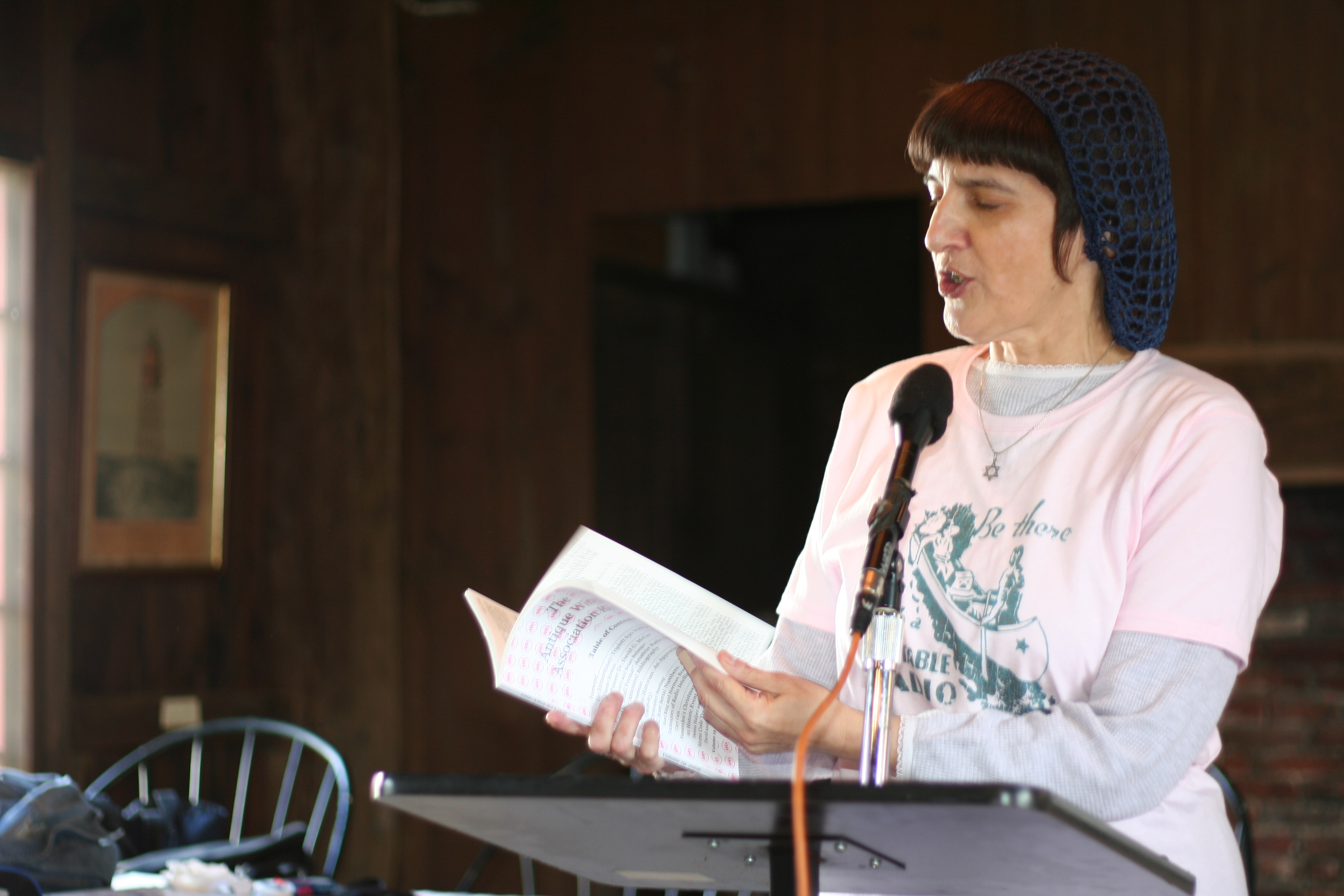
- Donna Halper speaking in Marshfield, Massachusetts, in 2006
- Born: February 14, 1947 (age 79); Dorchester, Massachusetts
- Education: Northeastern University
- Occupations: Radio personality, radio consultant, historian, associate professor

Donna Lee Halper (born February 14, 1947 in Dorchester, Massachusetts) is a Boston-based historian and radio consultant. Beginning in 1968, Halper worked as a radio disc jockey and music director and is credited with discovering the progressive rock band Rush while at WMMS in Cleveland in 1974. She has taught courses in broadcasting, media criticism and media history and is author of several books, including the first book-length study devoted to the history of women in American broadcasting, Invisible Stars: A Social History of Women in American Broadcasting. In March 2023, it was announced that she would be inducted into the Massachusetts Broadcasters Hall of Fame and receive the Pioneer Broadcaster Award.

== Career ==
Halper attended Northeastern University, where she received B.A., M.A., and M.Ed. degrees. In 1968, she became the first female announcer at Northeastern's campus radio station, WNEU (now WRBB). Halper worked for 12 years as a radio broadcaster, music director and music producer in Cleveland; New York City; Washington, D.C.; and Boston.

In 1980, Halper became a radio consultant for college and commercial radio stations in the United States, eastern Canada, and Puerto Rico.

In the late 1980s, Halper began teaching college courses about broadcasting, media criticism and media history. She taught part-time at Emerson College in the journalism department and the Institute of Liberal Arts until the summer of 2008, when she became an assistant professor of communication at Lesley University in Cambridge, Massachusetts. In 2012, she was promoted to associate professor.

In 1987–88, Halper taught courses at Franklin Pierce University in Rindge, New Hampshire, on radio programming. She has also taught at the University of Massachusetts Amherst and the University of Massachusetts Boston. In May 2011, she earned a Ph.D. in communication from UMass Amherst.

A media and social historian, Halper has written essays for encyclopedias and magazines. In 2008, she contributed a chapter in Michael C. Keith's Radio Cultures: The Sound Medium in American Life, and in 2010, her essay about the impact of McCarthyism on broadcasting appeared in the academic reference work Perspectives in American Social History: Cold War and McCarthy Era. She has written books, including Icons of Talk: The Media Mouths that Changed America, a history of talk shows.

Halper has researched and written about baseball history for the Society for American Baseball Research Baseball Research Journal, documenting radio broadcasting's impact on the game and highlighting obscure, overlooked, or neglected aspects of the sport. She has written articles about Negro leagues players and sportswriters, including Frank "Fay" Young" and Russell J. "Russ" Cowans.

Halper has appeared seen on C-SPAN, where she gave a talk in 2020 about women in early broadcasting. As a guest speaker, she specializes in the history of radio and television, often bringing with her a collection of rare memorabilia. She has been a guest expert on media history on NPR, PBS, the History Channel and on local television stations WCVB-TV and NECN. Her work has focused on women and minorities in media history, talk radio and people whose contributions to broadcasting have been overlooked or forgotten, such as broadcast pioneers like John Shepard III, Eunice Randall and Big Brother Bob Emery.

== Rush ==
Halper is credited with discovering the rock band Rush while working as the music director at radio station WMMS in Cleveland in 1974. After a Canadian record producer gave her the then-unknown band's album, she played the song “Working Man” on the air. Listeners started requesting more Rush tracks. Soon, other radio stations began including Rush songs in their playlists, and by late summer of 1974, the band got a U.S. recording contract. As an acknowledgement of her role in their success, the band dedicated their first two albums to Halper. Halper appeared in the 2010 documentary about Rush, Beyond the Lighted Stage. On June 25, 2010, she was a speaker when Rush received a star on Hollywood's Walk of Fame. A depiction of Halper, along with depictions of other DJs who were instrumental in Rush's success, is included in the animated video of "The Spirit of Radio", released for the 40th anniversary of Permanent Waves, the album the song originally appeared on.

== Published works ==
- Donna L. Halper (April 1991). Full-service radio: programming for the community. Focal Press. ISBN 978-0-240-80083-7.
- Donna L. Halper (1991). Radio Music Directing. Focal Press. ISBN 978-0-240-80081-3.
- Donna L. Halper (February 11, 2015). Invisible Stars: A Social History of Women in American Broadcasting. Routledge, Taylor & Francis. ISBN 978-1-317-52017-7.
- Donna L. Halper (2009). Icons of Talk: The Media Mouths that Changed America. Greenwood Press. ISBN 978-0-313-34381-0.
- Donna L. Halper (2011). Boston Radio: 1920-2010. Arcadia Publishing. ISBN 978-0-7385-7410-3.
- Donna L. Halper (May 2015). "A Lady Sporting Editor: How Ina Eloise Young Covered Baseball and Made History". ResearchGate. doi:10.13140/RG.2.1.2205.8640.
