= Fly by Night (Rush song) =

- Dutch single picture sleeve

Single by Rush

from the album Fly by Night
- B-side: "Anthem"
- Released: April 23, 1975
- Recorded: December 1974
- Studio: Toronto Sound (Toronto)
- Genre: Hard rock; power pop
- Length: 3:20
- Label: Mercury
- Songwriters: Geddy Lee; Neil Peart
- Producers: Rush; Terry Brown

Rush singles chronology
"In the Mood" (1974)	"Fly by Night" (1975)	"Return of the Prince" (1975)

Music video
- "Fly by Night" on YouTube

"Fly by Night" is a song by Canadian rock band Rush. It was released in 1975 and is the title track of their second studio album. The music was written by bassist Geddy Lee and the lyrics were penned by drummer Neil Peart. Peart wrote the song about his first trip away from home. In 1971, at 18 years old, he left behind his small-town Canadian life and flew to England. Lee sings the lead vocals and on the song's middle eight, his voice is fed through a Leslie speaker.

It was released as a single in April 1975. It marked the first time a single by the band was also released in markets other than the United States or Canada, as it was released in The Netherlands and Australia during the summer of 1975.

Cash Box described it as "a hard-rocking, well-produced cut" that is "very Zeppelinish, with lead guitar and rhythm tracks that could have you evicted." Record World said that a live medley with "In the Mood" "puts the emphasis on fuzz toned guitar and histrionic vocals."

Peart wrote a prologue that is not in the song: "airport scurry / flurry faces / parade of passers-by / people going many places / with a smile or just a sigh / waiting, waiting, pass the time / another cigarette / get in line, gate thirty-nine / the time is not here yet."

In December 1976, the song was released as a single a second time, in a live medley with "In the Mood" from the band's live album All the World's a Stage. This version became the band's first single to reach the US Billboard Hot 100, charting at No. 88.

In his 2023 memoir, My Effin' Life, Lee writes that despite the song's continuing popularity he has a low opinion of it: "It sounds kinda dinky to me!" He has felt this way since first hearing it on the radio after the album's release. "To my taste there was something too sugary, too corny about the chorus", he observes. Lee assumes he must have been satisfied with it for some reason after the band recorded it, "but it's never wrapped its arms around me."

== Personnel ==
- Geddy Lee – bass, vocals
- Alex Lifeson – guitar
- Neil Peart – drums

== Use in media ==
- It was used in the Canadian TV series Degrassi High, in the season two episode "Home, Sweet Home".
- The song was used in TV series Supernatural, in the season one episode "Wendigo".
- In 2012, it was used in an American TV commercial for the Volkswagen Passat.
- It was one of three Rush songs made available to download for play in Rock Band 3 on December 13, 2011, along with a live version of "The Spirit Of Radio" and the single edit of "Caravan".
- In the video game Dota 2, the playable character known as "Dragon Knight" has a voice line referencing the song.

== See also ==
- Rush discography
- List of Rush songs
