= John Rutsey =

Canadian drummer (1952–2008)

- Rutsey (center) as part of the original Rush line-up

Background information
- Born: John Howard Rutsey; July 23, 1952
- Died: May 11, 2008 (aged 55) Toronto, Ontario, Canada
- Genres: Hard rock; heavy metal
- Occupation: Drummer
- Years active: 1963–1978
- Formerly of: Rush

John Howard Rutsey (July 23, 1952 – May 11, 2008) was a Canadian musician best known as a founding member and original drummer of Rush. He performed on the band's 1974 debut album, but left shortly after its release when health problems limited his ability to tour with the band. He was replaced by Neil Peart, who remained Rush's drummer until 2015.

== Biography ==
=== Personal life ===
Rutsey was the son of Toronto Telegram crime reporter Howard Rutsey. He had an older brother named Bill, and a younger brother named Mike who became a baseball writer. After their father died of a heart attack, the brothers were raised by their mother, Eva.

Rutsey was a student at St. Patrick's School, where he met Gary Weinrib and Alex Zivojinovich (who would later change their names to Geddy Lee and Alex Lifeson, respectively).

=== Formation of Rush ===
Rutsey and Lifeson became close friends at school, and the pair would play street hockey together in their neighborhood. Both were interested in rock music, and talked often about forming a band. They initially were members of the bands The Projection with Bill Fitzgerald and "Doc" Cooper. Eventually, they were joined by their mutual school friend, Geddy Lee, to form the earliest version of Rush. Lee and Lifeson were listening to progressive rock bands such as Yes, Pink Floyd and Genesis at that time, but Rutsey drew more inspiration from harder styles of music.

Rutsey's commitment has been credited with providing the band's early direction, as it was he who took the band most seriously and insisted on regular practice sessions. According to Ian Grandy, a member of the band's early road crew, "I've said it before and I'll say it again: There would have been no 'Rush' without John." At Rutsey's suggestion, Rush was initially a glam rock band. "John led the guys as far as being 'glam rockers', with really flashy jackets and pants, and eight-inch high boots", according to Grandy. "One time, he was speaking to me at the Gasworks and I said, 'Didn't we used to be the same height (5'8")?' He laughed and said 'Well, maybe a long time ago!'"

Rutsey's brother, Bill, came up with the name Rush for the band during a rehearsal in the Rutsey family basement in mid–1968.

=== Career ===
The band formed with Rutsey on drums, Lifeson on guitars, and, on vocals and bass, Jeff Jones, who left after their first concert and was replaced by Lee. During these early years, Rutsey played on the "Not Fade Away"/"You Can't Fight It" single as well as the debut album Rush.

Lee and Lifeson have acknowledged that during the writing and recording sessions for the band's debut album, Rutsey was the band's lyricist. When recording started, however, he did not deliver any lyrics. In interviews, Lee and Lifeson have said that Rutsey was dissatisfied with what he had written and had torn up the lyric sheets. Lee hastily wrote the lyrics to all the songs before recording the vocal tracks. When Rush performed live, Rutsey would introduce the band members to the audience, and announce the songs before performing them.

Soon after Rush released its debut album, Rutsey left the band, due to musical differences, health concerns related to diabetes, and his general distaste for touring. Rutsey's final performance with the group was on July 25, 1974, at Centennial Hall in London, Ontario. He was replaced by Neil Peart. In one of his rare interviews, Rutsey stated that he had no regrets about leaving Rush and insisted that he left because he did not like the band's music anymore.

=== Later life ===
In 1978, The City magazine reported that Rutsey was doing "some screenwriting" and had been rehearsing with a new band called Stinger, but the band proved to be short-lived and he eventually retired from the music industry. By 1982, Rutsey had been doing "a bit of TV work" and began to pursue a career in bodybuilding.

Rutsey had occasionally kept in touch with Lee and Lifeson in the years following his departure from Rush. Lifeson stated in a 1989 interview that he still often had seen Rutsey, and after leaving the band Rutsey went into bodybuilding. Lifeson remarked, "He competed on an amateur level for a while, doing that for a few years, and has sort of been in and out of that, but he still works out, and I work out with him a few times a week at a local gym – at a Gold's, here in Toronto." In 2005, Lifeson said that he had not seen Rutsey since around 1990. Lee stated in his 2023 memoir My Effin' Life that Rutsey was one of the guests at his wedding in 1976, and according to Lee, it was the only time Rutsey and Neil Peart had ever met.

== Death ==
On May 11, 2008, Rutsey died in his sleep of an apparent heart attack, related to complications from diabetes. Rutsey's family wished to keep the funeral a private affair, although donations would be sent to the Juvenile Diabetes Research Foundation in Markham, Ontario.

=== Aftermath ===
After Rutsey's death, Lee and Lifeson released this statement: "Our memories of the early years of Rush when John was in the band are very fond to us. Those years spent in our teens dreaming of one day doing what we continue to do decades later are special. Although our paths diverged many years ago, we smile today, thinking back on those exciting times and remembering John's wonderful sense of humour and impeccable timing. He will be deeply missed by all he touched."

Rutsey's part in the band's early history is acknowledged in the 2010 documentary Rush: Beyond the Lighted Stage. Tape-recorded comments from him are heard during the film, and the DVD release includes two performances with him on drums in its bonus features. A third performance is included as a bonus feature on the Time Machine 2011: Live in Cleveland home video release.

== Discography ==
Single:

- 1973: "Not Fade Away" / "You Can't Fight It" (with Rush)

Studio album:

- 1974: Rush (with Rush)
