= Moon Records (Canada) =

Canadian record label

Moon Records is a Canadian record publishing company established in 1973 after Rush and their SRO management company run by Ray Danniels were unable to find a record label interested in signing them. Moon Records served as an outlet for the band's first single, "Not Fade Away", and self-titled debut album Rush in 1974. Moon was distributed by London Records of Canada.

After the success of Rush, the band was offered a two-record deal with the PolyGram Group and signed with Polygram's Mercury Records in 1974. Moon Records folded as a label and transformed in 1974 from an independent record label to a music production company. Anthem Records would become Rush's label in Canada.

Neil Peart of Rush, who joined the band after its Moon Records period, said about the experience of releasing the debut of the band:

"When we were starting, no record company in Canada would touch us, and the only way we could get a record released was by putting it out ourselves on an independent label, which is pretty pathetic when you think about us being the biggest band Canada has produced. It makes you a little bit cynical about the whole thing."

With Moon Records acting as a production company for Rush, Ray Danniels, Rush's manager also launched Taurus Records (1973 – 1977).
