= Rush (band) =

Canadian rock band

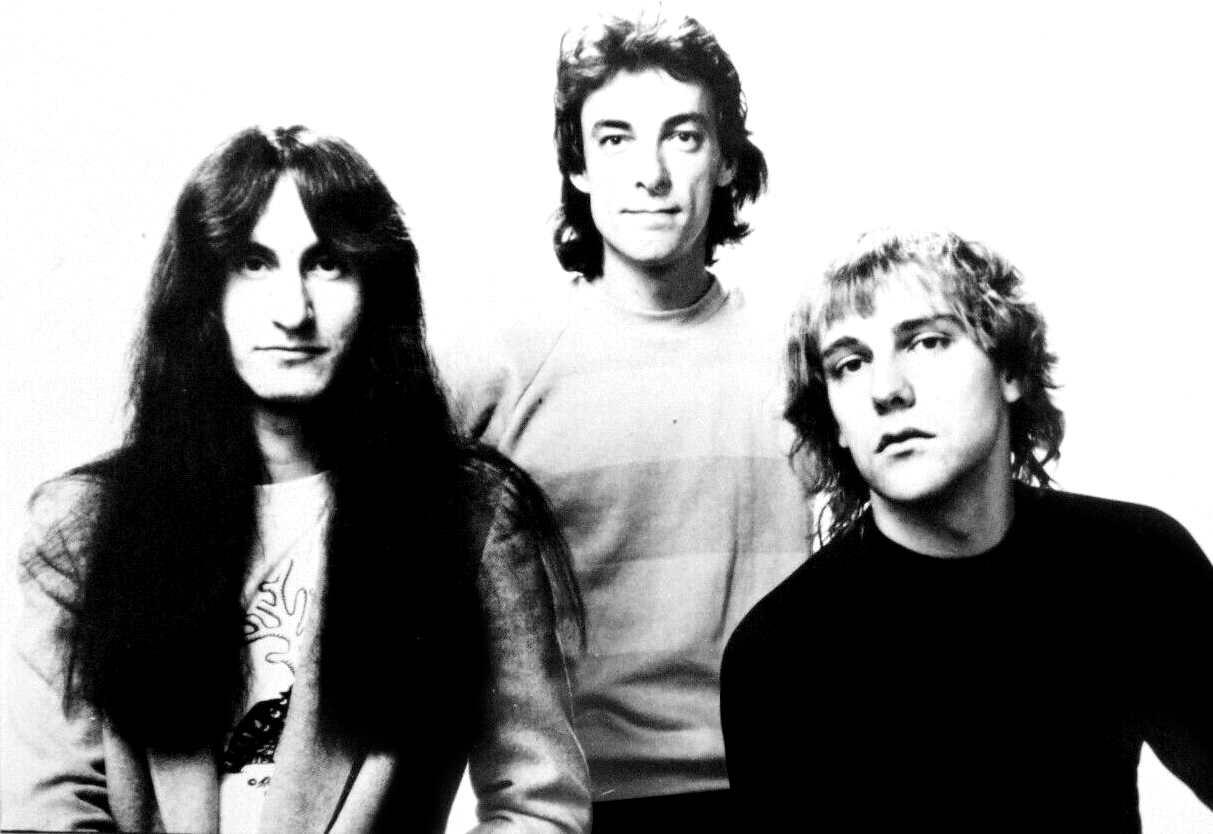
- Classic lineup of Rush in 1981. Left to right: Geddy Lee, Neil Peart and Alex Lifeson

Background information
- Also known as: Hadrian (1969)
- Origin: Toronto, Ontario, Canada
- Genres: Progressive rock; hard rock; heavy metal
- Works: Discography; songs; instrumentals
- Years active: 1968–2015 (Note: Although Rush did not officially disband, they were on hiatus from 1997 to 2001, largely due to personal tragedies in Peart's life. While Lifeson did not confirm their dissolution until 2018, Rush's last activity during their initial run was the R40 Live Tour in 2015.); 2025–present
- Labels: Moon; Mercury; Anthem; Vertigo; Atlantic; Roadrunner
- Members: Alex Lifeson; Geddy Lee
- Past members: John Rutsey; Jeff Jones; Neil Peart; (See Band members section for all members)
- Website: rush.com

Rush is a Canadian rock band, formed in Toronto in 1968. The band's original line-up included guitarist Alex Lifeson, drummer John Rutsey, and bassist and vocalist Jeff Jones, whom Geddy Lee replaced shortly after its formation. Rush went through a few lineup changes before settling on its classic power trio line-up with the addition of Neil Peart in July 1974, replacing Rutsey four months after the release of their self-titled debut album. The lineup of Lifeson, Lee, and Peart remained stable for the remainder of the band's initial run until 2015, when Peart retired from music. Lifeson and Lee occasionally worked together after Peart's death in 2020, and announced a 2026–2027 reunion tour as Rush in October 2025, with Anika Nilles filling in for Peart, and Loren Gold as the band's keyboardist.

Rush is known for their virtuosic musicianship, complex compositions and eclectic lyrical motifs, which drew primarily on science fiction, fantasy, and philosophy. The band's style changed over the years, from blues-inspired hard rock, to progressive rock, through a period in the 1980s marked by heavy use of synthesizers, and finally back to guitar-driven rock. The members of Rush have been acknowledged as some of the most proficient players on their respective instruments, with each winning numerous awards in magazine readers' polls in various years.

As of 2026, Rush is the 90th best-selling artist in the US with sales of 27 million albums and industry sources estimate their total worldwide album sales at over 43 million. They have been awarded 14 platinum and 3 multi-platinum albums in the US and 17 platinum albums in Canada. Rush was nominated for seven Grammy Awards, won ten Juno Awards, and won an International Achievement Award at the 2009 SOCAN Awards. The band was inducted into the Canadian Music Hall of Fame in 1994 and the Rock and Roll Hall of Fame in 2013. Music critics consider Rush to be one of the greatest rock bands of all time.

== History ==
=== 1968–1974: Early years and debut album ===
Rush formed in August 1968 in the Willowdale neighbourhood of Toronto, Ontario by guitarist Alex Lifeson, drummer John Rutsey, and bassist/vocalist Jeff Jones. Lifeson and Rutsey had collaborated in two short-lived groups, The Lost Cause and The Projection. The trio performed their debut concert in September at the Coff-Inn, a youth centre in the basement of St. Theodore of Canterbury Anglican Church, and were paid CA$25. The group had no name at the time of the booking; "Rush" was suggested by Rutsey's brother, Bill, as nicely concise. During this formative period, the band's repertoire consisted primarily of blues-rock covers by artists such as Cream, Jimi Hendrix, and John Mayall.

Logistical challenges eventually led to Jones's departure; upon his recommendation, Lifeson's schoolmate Geddy Lee (born Gary Weinrib) assumed the role of bassist and lead vocalist in time for their second gig at the Coff-In. The lineup briefly expanded to a quartet in January 1969 with the addition of multi-instrumentalist Lindy Young, and the band started performing at other drop-in centres and high schools. During this period, they secured professional management with Ray Danniels and agent Vic Wilson. Despite this progress, internal friction resulted in Lee's temporary dismissal. Lee recalled that it was Danniels who deemed him "not suitable, for whatever reasons he had", but Lifeson noted that Rutsey, whose influential personality often steered the group, had pushed for a different bassist and went along with the decision. After Lee's exit, Rutsey recruited bassist Joe Perna and renamed the band Hadrian. However, after a poorly received performance with Perna, Rutsey and Lifeson invited Lee to rejoin in September 1969. Lee said: "I got a call from John and he said, 'Can we get together?' Basically, 'Can you come back? We're sorry.'" Young left the group to study at college. After brief tenures by second guitarist Bob Vopni in 1969 and rhythm guitarist Mitch Bossi in 1971, the lineup stabilised in 1972 as a power trio of Lifeson, Rutsey and Lee.

Line-up of Rush for the self-titled debut, featuring drummer John Rutsey (center).

The group refined their live performances through extensive touring of the Ontario high school circuit. Drawing heavy influence from Led Zeppelin's debut album, Rush developed a blues-based hard rock sound characterised by Lee's increasingly high-register falsetto. During this period, Danniels struggled to secure consistent bookings as the band began prioritising original material over standard covers in their live sets. The band's professional trajectory shifted in 1971 after a legislative change that lowered Ontario’s legal drinking age from 21 to 18. This allowed the group to play bars and clubs, a move Lee described as the catalyst for their evolution from a "casual garage act" into a professional unit performing six nights a week. After failing to secure a major label contract, Danniels founded the independent Moon Records and negotiated a distribution deal with London Records for a single and one full-length album. For their debut release, the band selected a cover of Buddy Holly's "Not Fade Away" as it had become a crowd favourite, with "You Can't Fight It", an original song, on the B-side. Released in September 1973, the single peaked at No. 88 on the national RPM Top Singles chart. The launch coincided with the band's first major high-profile engagement, opening for the New York Dolls in Toronto.

Dissatisfied with the audio quality of their initial album recording sessions, the group re-recorded and remixed the material at Toronto Sound in late 1973 with the more experienced Terry Brown, which marked the beginning of a ten-year creative partnership. To help raise the $9,000 required to complete the album, Danniels sold his interest in his management company. Although Rutsey was originally tasked with writing the lyrics, he tore up his drafts immediately before the vocal sessions; Lee subsequently composed a new set of lyrics based on earlier versions to complete the album's final takes. Rutsey looked back on this incident with regret, and put it down to feeling "very confused about what [he] really wanted to do."

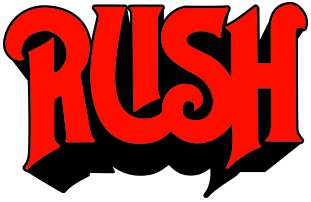
The band's first logo, as seen on their debut album

After a delay attributed to a provincial vinyl shortage, the self-titled debut, Rush, was released in March 1974. An initial pressing of 3,500 copies sold out quickly, and the album eventually reached No. 86 on the RPM Top Albums chart. While several contemporary critics criticised the album as derivative of Led Zeppelin, it gained traction in the United States after Donna Halper, music director and DJ at WMMS in Cleveland, had received a copy and added "Working Man" to the station's rotation. The song's blue-collar themes resonated with the city's industrial workforce, triggering a surge in demand for the Canadian import. To capitalise on this regional interest, Danniels secured a slot for the band opening for ZZ Top at Cleveland's Allen Theatre in June 1974. Later that month, Rush signed with the U.S.-based American Talent International (ATI) booking agency. Executive Ira Blacker subsequently mailed a copy of the album to an enthusiastic Cliff Burnstein of A&R at Mercury Records, who signed the band within 24 hours to a two-album, $200,000 deal with a $50,000 advance plus $25,000 towards future recording costs. Blacker subsequently departed ATI to become the band's American co-manager, booking them as an opening act across the U.S. through the end of the year. In recognition of her role in their American breakthrough, the band included a dedication to Halper on the U.S. release of the album that was rush-released to coincide with the tour.

After a series of club dates, Rutsey played his final gig with the band on July 25. His preference for more straightforward rock was incompatible with Lifeson and Lee's desire to explore the complex arrangements of progressive rock influences like Yes and Pink Floyd. In addition, Rutsey's health presented logistical challenges for large-scale touring. As a Type 1 diabetic, he required frequent hospitalisation for monitoring and insulin regulation. These complications had already disrupted the band's schedule as early as October 1973, leading to his temporary replacement by drummer Gerry Fielding.

=== 1974–1977: Arrival of Neil Peart and foray into progressive rock ===
Line-up as of Caress of Steel (1975), with drummer Neil Peart (center)

After auditioning five drummers, Lifeson and Lee picked Neil Peart, who joined on July 29, 1974, which was two weeks before the group's first US tour. They performed their first concert together on August 14 at the Civic Arena in Pittsburgh, opening for Uriah Heep and Manfred Mann's Earth Band to more than 11,000 people. Peart assumed the role of lyricist; Lifeson and Lee had little interest in the job and recognized Peart's wider vocabulary range from reading regularly. Lifeson and Lee focused primarily on the music, with the new material displaying their influences from progressive rock bands Yes and Pink Floyd. When the U.S. tour concluded in December 1974, Rush had reached its peak of No. 105 on the U.S. Billboard 200 chart.

Fly by Night (1975), Rush's first album with Peart, saw the inclusion of the story song "By-Tor & the Snow Dog", replete with complex arrangements and a multi-section format. Lyrical themes also underwent dramatic changes because of Peart's love for fantasy and science-fiction literature. Despite the new styles, some other songs on the album mirrored the simplistic blues style found on Rush's debut. "Fly by Night" was released as a single that reached No. 45 in Canada. The album reached No. 9 in Canada, where it was certified platinum by the Canadian Recording Industry Association (CAN) for selling 100,000 copies and by the Recording Industry Association of America (RIAA) for selling 1 million copies in the U.S.

Caress of Steel (1975) followed Fly by Night. It is a five-track album featuring two extended multi-chapter songs, "The Necromancer" and "The Fountain of Lamneth". Some critics said Caress of Steel was unfocused and an audacious move for the band because of the placement of two back-to-back protracted songs, as well as a heavier reliance on atmospherics and storytelling, a large deviation from Fly by Night. Intended to be their breakthrough album, Caress of Steel sold below expectations. The tour consisted of smaller venues and declining box office receipts, which led to it being nicknamed the Down the Tubes Tour.

The "starman" logo, created by Hugh Syme, first appeared on the back cover of 2112. The logo became a staple of Rush's early live shows, and was featured on the cover of their double live album All the World's a Stage (1976).

In light of these events, Rush's record label tried to pressure the members into moulding their next album in a more commercially friendly and accessible fashion; the band ignored the requests and developed their next album 2112 (1976) with a 20-minute title track divided into seven sections. Despite that, the album was Rush's first taste of significant commercial success as it reached No. 5 in Canada, becoming their first to reach double platinum certification.

Rush press photo for 2112 (1976)

Rush toured in support of 2112 between February 1976 and June 1977 with concerts in Canada, the US, and for the first time Europe, with dates in the UK, Sweden, Germany, and the Netherlands. The three sold-out shows at Massey Hall in Toronto in June 1976 were recorded for Rush's debut live album, All the World's a Stage. Released in September of that year, the double album reached No. 6 in Canada and became Rush's first to crack the US top 40. Record World wrote: "Building its American reputation slowly but steadily Rush stands poised for breaking through all the way via this two record live set [...] All the highly charged electricity is here in an explosive setting." The liner notes include the statement, "This album to us, signifies the end of the beginning, a milestone to mark the close of chapter one, in the annals of Rush."

=== 1977–1981: Peak progressive era ===
Press photo for A Farewell to Kings (1977)

After the conclusion of the 2112 tour, Rush recorded A Farewell to Kings (1977) and Hemispheres (1978) at Rockfield Studios in Monmouthshire, Wales. The albums had the band members expanding the progressive elements in their music. "As our tastes got more obscure", Lee said in an interview, "we discovered more progressive rock-based bands like Yes, Van der Graaf Generator, and King Crimson, and we were very inspired by those bands. They made us want to make our music more interesting and more complex, and we tried to blend that with our own personalities to see what we could come up with that was indisputably us." Increased synthesizer use, lengthy songs, and highly dynamic playing featuring complex time signature changes became a staple of Rush's compositions. To achieve a broader, more progressive sound, Lifeson began to experiment with classical and twelve-string guitars, and Lee added bass-pedal synthesizers and Minimoog.

Likewise, Peart's percussion became diversified in the form of triangles, glockenspiel, wood blocks, cowbells, timpani, gong, and chimes. Beyond instrument additions, the band kept in stride with progressive rock trends by continuing to compose long, conceptual songs with science fiction and fantasy overtones. As the new decade approached, Rush gradually began to dispose of their older styles of music in favour of shorter and sometimes softer arrangements, due in part to the band's exhaustion from recording Hemispheres. The lyrics up to this point were heavily influenced by classical poetry, fantasy literature, science fiction, and the writings of novelist Ayn Rand, as exhibited most prominently by their 1975 song "Anthem" from Fly by Night and a specifically acknowledged derivation in 2112 (1976). The first single from A Farewell to Kings, "Closer to the Heart", was the band's first successful song in the UK, peaking at No. 36, while reaching No. 76 in the US and No. 45 in Canada. A Farewell to Kings did not sell as well as 2112, but still went platinum in both Canada and the United States. By this time, Rush's record deal allowed them a CA$250,000 advance on each album and a 16% royalty rate.

Permanent Waves (1980) shifted Rush's style of music with the introduction of reggae and new wave elements. Although a hard rock style was still evident, more synthesizers were introduced. Because of the limited airplay Rush's previous extended-length songs received, Permanent Waves contained shorter, more radio-friendly songs, such as "The Spirit of Radio" and "Freewill", which helped the album become Rush's highest-charting album to date. "The Spirit of Radio" became the group's biggest hit single to date, peaking at No. 22 in Canada, No. 51 on the US Billboard Hot 100, and No. 13 on the UK Singles Chart. Peart's lyrics on Permanent Waves shifted toward an expository tone with subject matter that dwelled less on fantastical or allegorical storytelling and more heavily on topics that explored humanistic, social, and emotional elements. Rush toured Permanent Waves for six months through 1980 to more than 650,000 people across 96 shows, becoming their first tour to make a profit. After the tour, Rush joined rock band Max Webster from Toronto and recorded "Battle Scar" for their 1980 album, Universal Juveniles. Max Webster's lyricist, Pye Dubois, offered the band lyrics to a song he had written. The band accepted, and after reworking by Peart the song became "Tom Sawyer".

"Tom Sawyer" (1981)
Sample of "Tom Sawyer" from the album Moving Pictures. It is one of the band's best-known songs.

Rush's popularity reached its pinnacle with the release of Moving Pictures in February 1981. Essentially, Moving Pictures continued where Permanent Waves left off, extending the trend of accessible and commercially friendly progressive rock which helped thrust them into the spotlight. The lead track, "Tom Sawyer", is probably the band's best-known song. When it was released, it reached No. 24 on the Canadian Top 40 Singles Chart, No. 44 on the Billboard Hot 100, and No. 8 on the new US Album Rock Tracks chart. The second single, "Limelight", also received a strong response from listeners and radio stations, going to No. 18 in Canada, No. 54 on the Hot 100, and No. 4 on the US Album Rock Tracks Chart. Moving Pictures was Rush's last album to feature an extended song, the 11-minute "The Camera Eye". The song contained the band's heaviest usage of synthesizers yet, hinting that Rush's music was shifting direction once more. Moving Pictures became the band's first album to reach No. 1 on the Canadian Albums Chart, and also reached No. 3 on the US Billboard 200 and UK album charts; it has been certified quintuple platinum by both the Recording Industry Association of America and Music Canada. After the success of Moving Pictures, Rush released their second live recording, Exit... Stage Left, in 1981.

=== 1981–1989: Synthesizer-oriented era ===
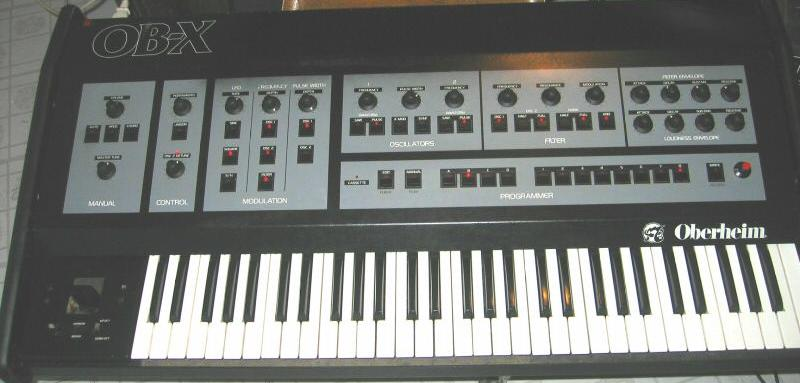
An Oberheim OB-X synthesizer, as used by Geddy Lee on the albums Moving Pictures and Signals

The band had another stylistic change with the recording of Signals in 1982. While Lee's synthesizers had been featured instruments since the late 1970s, keyboards were shifted from the background to the melodic front-lines in songs like "Countdown" and the opening track, "Subdivisions". Both feature prominent lead synthesizer lines with minimalistic guitar chords and solos. Other previously unused instrument additions were seen in the song "Losing It", featuring collaborator Ben Mink on electric violin.

"Subdivisions" (1982)
Sample of "Subdivisions" from the album Signals. This song is notable for demonstrating the band's foray into its synthesizer period.

Signals also represented a drastic stylistic transformation apart from instrumental changes. The album contained Rush's biggest hit single, "New World Man", while other more experimental songs such as "Digital Man", "The Weapon", and "Chemistry" expanded the band's use of ska, reggae, and funk. The second single, "Subdivisions" reached No. 36 in Canada and No. 5 on the US Album Rock Tracks Chart. Both singles reached the Top 50 in the UK. Signals became the group's second No. 1 album in Canada, their third straight No. 3 album in the UK, and peaked at No. 10 in the US, while continuing their moderate success in the Netherlands, Sweden and Norway, making the Top 30 in each country. Although the band members consciously decided to move in this overall direction, creative differences between the band and longtime producer Terry Brown began to emerge. The band felt dissatisfied with Brown's studio treatment of Signals, while Brown was becoming more uncomfortable with the increased use of synthesizers. Ultimately, Rush and Brown parted ways in 1983, and the experimentation with new electronic instruments and varying musical styles would come into further play on their next studio album.

Press photo for Grace Under Pressure (1984)

The style and production of Signals were augmented and taken to new heights on Grace Under Pressure (1984). Peart named the album, as he borrowed the words of Ernest Hemingway ("Courage is grace under pressure") to describe what the band had to go through after making the decision to leave Brown. Producer Steve Lillywhite, who had gained fame with successful productions of Simple Minds and U2, was to produce Grace Under Pressure. He backed out at the last moment, however, much to the ire of Lee, Lifeson and Peart. Lee said, "Steve Lillywhite is really not a man of his word ... after agreeing to do our record, he got an offer from Simple Minds, changed his mind, blew us off ... so it put us in a horrible position." Rush eventually hired Peter Henderson to co-produce and engineer the album instead.

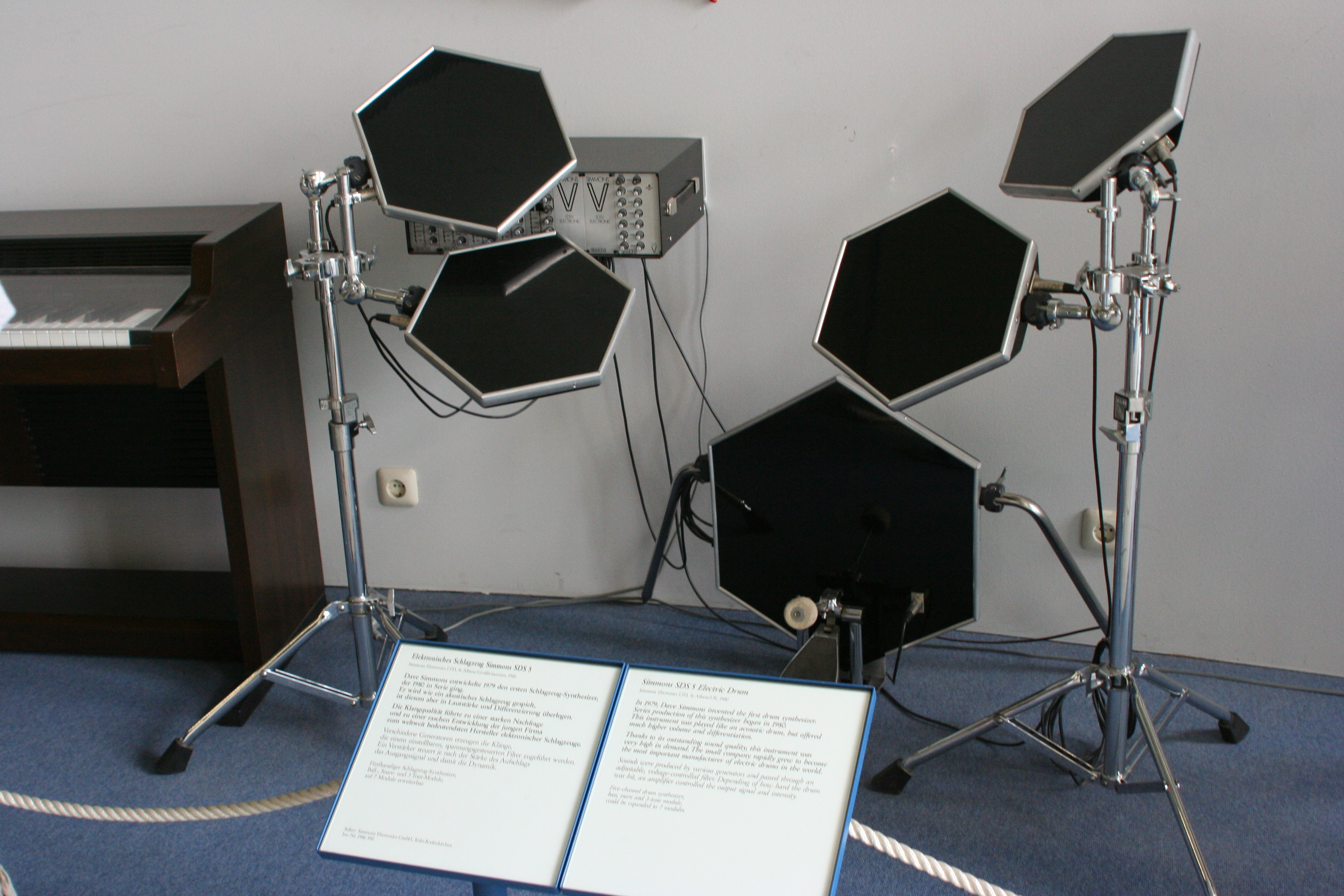
Neil Peart began incorporating Simmons Electronic Drums, beginning with Grace Under Pressure (1984).

Musically, although Lee's use of sequencers and synthesizers remained the band's cornerstone, his focus on new technology was complemented by Peart's adaptation of Simmons electronic drums and percussion. Lifeson's contributions on the album were decidedly enhanced, in response to the minimalist role he played on Signals. Still, many of his trademark guitar textures remained intact in the form of open reggae chords and funk and new-wave rhythms. Grace Under Pressure reached the Top 5 in Canada and the UK and the Top 10 in the US It became the highest charter to that date in Sweden (No. 18), while becoming their first album to chart in Germany (No. 43) and Finland (No. 14). While "Distant Early Warning" was not a success on Top 40 radio, it peaked at No. 5 on the US Album Rock Tracks chart.

Press photo for Hold Your Fire (1987)

With new producer Peter Collins, the band released Power Windows (1985) and Hold Your Fire (1987). The music on the two albums gives far more emphasis and prominence to Lee's multi-layered synthesizer work, and he switched to an English-made Wal MK1 bass. While fans and critics took notice of Lifeson's diminished guitar work, his presence was still palpable. Lifeson, like many guitarists in the mid to late 1980s, experimented with processors that reduced his instrument to echoey chord bursts and thin leads. Power Windows went to No. 2 in Canada while peaking at No. 9 and 10 in the UK and US, respectively. The lead track, "The Big Money" made the Top 50 in Canada, the UK and US, plus No. 4 on the US Mainstream Rock Chart. Hold Your Fire represents both an extension of the guitar style found on Power Windows, and, according to AllMusic critic Eduardo Rivadavia, the culmination of this era of Rush. Hold Your Fire only went gold in the US, whereas the previous five Rush albums had gone platinum, although it managed to peak at No. 13 on the Billboard 200. and made the Top 10 in Canada, the UK and Finland. Two tracks from Hold Your Fire, "Force Ten" and "Time Stand Still", both peaked at No. 3 on the US Mainstream Rock Tracks chart.

A third live album and video, A Show of Hands (1989), was released by Anthem and Mercury following the Power Windows and Hold Your Fire tours, demonstrating the aspects of Rush in the 1980s. A Show of Hands met with strong fan approval, but Rolling Stone critic Michael Azerrad dismissed it as "musical muscle" with 1.5 stars, saying Rush fans viewed their favourite power trio as "the holy trinity". Nevertheless, A Show of Hands reached the gold album mark in the US and the platinum level in Canada. At that point, the group decided to change international record labels from Mercury to Atlantic. After Rush's departure in 1989, Mercury released a double platinum two-volume compilation of their Rush catalogue, Chronicles (1990).

=== 1989–2000: Return to guitar-oriented sound and hiatus ===
"Dreamline" (1991)
Sample of "Dreamline" from the album Roll the Bones. This song is notable for demonstrating the band's return to a more standard three piece instrument style, where synthesizers are used more sparingly and the guitar returning to the forefront of the sound.

Rush started to deviate from its 1980s style with the albums Presto (1989) and Roll the Bones (1991). Produced by record engineer and musician Rupert Hine, these two albums saw Rush shedding much of its keyboard-saturated sound. Beginning with Presto, the band opted for arrangements notably more guitar-centric than the previous two studio albums. Although synthesizers were still used, they were no longer featured as the centre-piece of Rush's compositions. Continuing this trend, Roll the Bones extended the use of the standard three-instrument approach with even less focus on synthesizers than its predecessor. While musically these albums do not deviate significantly from a general pop-rock sound, Rush incorporated other musical styles such as funk and hip-hop in "Roll the Bones" and jazz in the instrumental track "Where's My Thing?". "Show Don't Tell" from Presto was a No. 1 hit on the US Mainstream Rock Tracks Chart, and while the album reached the Top 10 in Canada, it was less successful in the US (No. 16) and the UK (No. 27). From Roll the Bones, "Dreamline" (No. 1) and "Ghost of a Chance" (No. 2) were successful on US Mainstream Rock Radio stations, marking a resurgence of Rush's album sales in the US (No. 3 and platinum), the UK (No. 10) and some other parts of northern Europe.

The transition from synthesizers to more guitar-oriented and organic instrumentation continued with Counterparts (1993) and its follow-up, Test for Echo (1996), both produced in collaboration with Peter Collins. Up to this point, Counterparts and Test for Echo were two of Rush's most guitar-driven albums. The latter album also includes elements of jazz and swing-style drumming by Peart, which he had learned from drum coach Freddie Gruber during the interim between Counterparts and Test for Echo. "Stick It Out" from Counterparts reached the summit of the US Mainstream Rock Tracks Chart, with the album peaking at No. 2 in the US and No. 6 in Canada. Test for Echo reached the Top 5 in both countries, with the title track again topping the US Mainstream Rock Tracks Chart. In October 1996, in support of Test For Echo, the band embarked on a North American tour, the band's first without an opening act and dubbed "An Evening with Rush". The tour was broken into two segments, spanning October through December 1996 and May through July 1997.

After the conclusion of the Test for Echo tour in 1997, the band entered a five-year hiatus primarily due to personal tragedies in Peart's life. Peart's daughter Selena died in a car crash in August 1997, and his wife Jacqueline died of cancer in June 1998. Peart went on hiatus to mourn and reflect. During that time, he travelled extensively throughout North America on his BMW motorcycle, covering 88,000 km (55,000 mi). In his book Ghost Rider: Travels on the Healing Road, Peart writes of how he had told his bandmates at Selena's funeral, "consider me retired." This left the band's future uncertain, and Lee and Lifeson prepared an archival album, Different Stages, for release during the hiatus. Mixed by producer Paul Northfield and engineered by Terry Brown, it is a three-disc live album featuring recorded performances from the band's Counterparts, Test For Echo, and A Farewell to Kings tours, dedicated to the memory of Selena and Jacqueline. After a time of grief and recovery, and while visiting longtime Rush photographer Andrew MacNaughton in Los Angeles, Peart was introduced to his future wife, photographer Carrie Nuttall, and they married on September 9, 2000. In 2001, Peart decided to return to Rush.

=== 2001–2009: Comeback, Vapor Trails and Snakes & Arrows ===
"One Little Victory" (2002)
Sample of "One Little Victory" from the album Vapor Trails. This song's rapid tempo and heavy double bass drumming was done intentionally to herald the comeback of the band after their hiatus.

In January 2001, Lee, Lifeson, and Peart came together to attempt to reassemble the band. According to Peart, "We laid out no parameters, no goals, no limitations, only that we would take a relaxed, civilized approach to the project." With the help of producer Paul Northfield, the band produced seventy-four minutes of music for their new album Vapor Trails, which was written and recorded in Toronto. Vapor Trails marked the first Rush studio recording to not include any keyboards or synthesizers since Caress of Steel. According to the band, the album's developmental process was extremely taxing and took approximately 14 months to finish, the longest they had ever spent writing and recording a studio album. Vapor Trails was released on May 14, 2002; to herald the band's comeback, the single and lead track from the album, "One Little Victory", was designed to grab the attention of listeners with its rapid guitar and drum tempos. The album was supported by the band's first tour in six years, including first-ever concerts in Brazil and Mexico City, where they played to some of the largest crowds of their career. The largest was a capacity crowd of 60,000 in São Paulo. Vapor Trails peaked at No. 3 in Canada and No. 6 in the US, while selling disappointingly in the UK, where it peaked at No. 38.

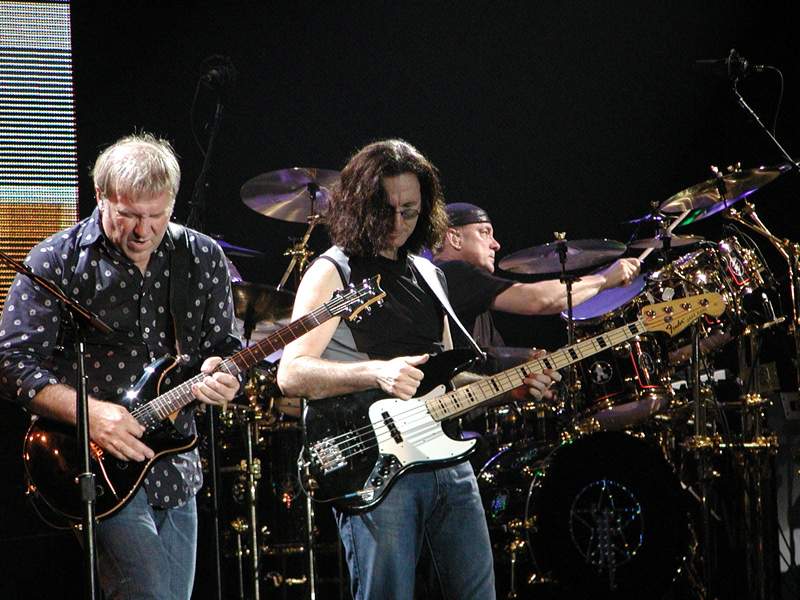
Rush performing in September 2004

A live album and DVD, Rush in Rio, was released in October 2003, featuring the last performance of the band's Vapor Trails tour on November 23, 2002, at Maracanã Stadium in Rio de Janeiro, Brazil. To celebrate the band's 30th anniversary, June 2004 saw the release of Feedback, an extended play work recorded in suburban Toronto featuring eight covers of artists including Cream, The Who and The Yardbirds, bands the members of Rush cite as being their inspiration around the time of their inception. Helping to support Feedback and continue celebrating their 30th anniversary as a band, Rush launched the 30th Anniversary Tour in the summer of 2004, playing dates in the United States, Canada, the United Kingdom, Germany, Italy, Sweden, the Czech Republic, and the Netherlands. On September 24, 2004, the concert at The Festhalle in Frankfurt, Germany was filmed for a DVD titled R30: 30th Anniversary World Tour, which was released on November 22, 2005. The release omitted eight songs also included on Rush in Rio; the complete concert was released on Blu-ray on December 8, 2009.

During promotional interviews for the R30 DVD, the band members revealed their intention to begin writing new material in early 2006. While in Toronto, Lifeson and Lee began writing songs in January 2006. During that time, Peart assumed the role of lyric writing while living in Southern California. In September 2007, Rush hired American producer Nick Raskulinecz to co-produce the album. The band went to Allaire Studios in Shokan, New York in November 2006 to record the bulk of the material. Taking five weeks to record, the sessions ended in December. On February 14, 2007, an announcement was made on the official Rush website that the title of the new album would be Snakes & Arrows. The first single, "Far Cry", was released to North American radio stations on March 12, 2007, and reached No. 2 on the Mediabase Mainstream and Radio and Records Charts.

"Far Cry" (2007)
Sample of "Far Cry", the first single from the album Snakes & Arrows.

The Rush website, newly redesigned on March 12, 2007, to support the new album, also announced that the band would embark on a tour to begin in the summer. Snakes & Arrows was released on May 1, 2007, in North America, where it debuted at No. 3 on the Billboard 200 with approximately 93,000 units sold in its first week. It peaked at No. 3 in Canada and No. 13 in the UK, selling an estimated 611,000 copies worldwide. Coinciding with the beginning of Atlantic Ocean hurricane season, "Spindrift" was released as the official second radio single on June 1, 2007, while "The Larger Bowl (A Pantoum)" came out as a single on June 25, 2007. "The Larger Bowl" peaked within the top 20 of both the Billboard Mainstream Rock and Mediabase Mainstream charts, but "Spindrift" failed to appear on any commercial chart. The planned intercontinental tour in support of Snakes & Arrows began on June 13, 2007, in Atlanta, coming to a close on October 29, 2007, at Hartwall Arena in Helsinki, Finland.

The 2008 portion of the Snakes & Arrows tour began on April 11, 2008, in San Juan, Puerto Rico, at José Miguel Agrelot Coliseum, and concluded on July 24, 2008, in Noblesville, Indiana at the Verizon Wireless Music Center. On April 15, 2008, the band released Snakes & Arrows Live, a double live album documenting the first leg of the tour, recorded at the Ahoy arena in Rotterdam, Netherlands on October 16 and 17, 2007. A DVD and Blu-ray recording of the same concerts was released on November 24, 2008. As Rush neared the conclusion of the Snakes & Arrows tour, they announced their first appearance on American television in over 30 years. They appeared on The Colbert Report on July 16, 2008 and were interviewed by Stephen Colbert; they performed "Tom Sawyer". Riding what film critic Manohla Dargis called a "pop cultural wave", the band appeared as themselves in the 2009 comedy film I Love You, Man.

=== 2009–2013: Time Machine Tour and Clockwork Angels ===
On February 16, 2009, Lifeson remarked that the band might begin working on a new album in the fall of 2009, with Nick Raskulinecz again producing. In November 2009, Lee, Lifeson and Peart were awarded the International Achievement Award at the annual SOCAN Awards in Toronto. On March 19, 2010, the CBC posted a video interview with Lee and Lifeson in which they discussed Rush's induction into the Canadian Songwriters Hall of Fame on March 28, 2010, at the Toronto Centre for the Arts' George Weston Recital Hall. The band was recognized for the songs "Limelight", "Closer to the Heart", "The Spirit of Radio", "Tom Sawyer" and "Subdivisions". In addition to discussing their induction, Lee and Lifeson touched on future material, with Lee saying, "Just about a month and a half ago we had no songs. And now we've been writing, and now we've got about 6 songs that we just love..." On March 26, 2010, in an interview with The Globe and Mail, Lifeson remarked that there was even the potential for two supporting tours. Soon afterwards, Peart confirmed that Raskulinecz had returned as co-producer.

In April 2010, Rush recorded "Caravan" and "BU2B", two new songs to be featured on the band's then-upcoming studio album Clockwork Angels, at Blackbird Studios in Nashville with Raskulinecz. "Caravan" and "BU2B" were released together on June 1, 2010, and made available for digital download. The Time Machine Tour's first leg began on June 29 in Albuquerque, New Mexico and finished on October 17 in Santiago, Chile, at the National Stadium. It featured the album Moving Pictures played in its entirety, as well as "Caravan" and "BU2B". It was suggested that Rush would return to the studio after the completion of the Time Machine Tour with plans to release Clockwork Angels in 2011.

However, Rush announced on November 19, 2010, that they would be extending the Time Machine Tour. The second leg began on March 30, 2011, in Fort Lauderdale, Florida and ended on July 2, 2011, in Seattle, Washington. On November 8, 2011, the band released Time Machine 2011: Live in Cleveland, a concert DVD, Blu-ray and double CD documenting the April 15, 2011, concert at the Quicken Loans Arena in Cleveland, Ohio. After the tour's second leg was finished, Rush entered Revolution Recording studios in Toronto finishing the recording of Clockwork Angels. The second single, "Headlong Flight", was released on April 19, 2012. Peart and author Kevin J. Anderson collaborated on a novelization of Clockwork Angels which was released in September 2012.

Clockwork Angels was released in the U.S. and Canada on June 12, 2012, reaching No. 1 in Canada, No. 2 in the US, No. 21 in the UK and entering the Top 10 in most of Rush's traditional northern European markets. The supporting Clockwork Angels Tour began on September 7, 2012, with performances on November 25 in Phoenix and November 28 in Dallas, recorded to make a live CD/DVD/Blu-ray which was released on November 19, 2013. During Rush's European leg of the Clockwork Angels Tour, the June 8, 2013, show at the Sweden Rock Festival was the group's first festival appearance in 30 years. On August 31, 2011, Rush switched their American distribution from Atlantic Records to the Warner Brothers majority-owned metal label Roadrunner Records. Roadrunner handled American distribution of Time Machine 2011: Live in Cleveland and Clockwork Angels. Anthem/Universal Music would continue to release their music in Canada. On April 18, 2013, Rush were inducted into the Rock and Roll Hall of Fame in Cleveland, Ohio.

=== 2013–2020: R40 Tour, disbandment and Peart's death ===
On November 18, 2013, Lifeson said that the band would take a year off after the completion of the world tour in support of Clockwork Angels. "We've committed to taking about a year off", Lifeson said. "We all agreed when we finished this [Clockwork Angels] tour [in early August], we were going to take this time off and we weren't going to talk about band stuff or make any plans. We committed to a year, so that's going to take us through to the end of next summer, for sure. That's the minimum. We haven't stopped or quit. Right now we're just relaxing. We're taking it easy and just enjoying our current employment."

In September 2014, the Rush R40 box set was announced to commemorate the 40th anniversary of the release of the band's self-titled debut album. It included five previously released live video albums, and various previously unreleased footage from across the band's career. On January 22, 2015, the band announced the Rush R40 Tour, celebrating the 40th anniversary of Peart's membership in the band. The tour started on May 8 in Tulsa, Oklahoma, and wrapped up on August 1 in Los Angeles.

On April 29, 2015, Lifeson said in an interview that R40 might be the final large-scale Rush tour due to his psoriatic arthritis and Peart's chronic tendinitis. He noted that it did not necessarily mean an end to the band, suggesting the possibility of smaller tours and limited performances. He said that he wanted to work on soundtracks with Lee. On December 7, 2015, Peart stated in an interview that he was retiring. The following day, Lee insisted that Peart's remarks had been taken out of context, and suggested he was "simply taking a break". Lifeson confirmed in 2016 that the R40 tour was the band's last large-scale tour. A documentary, Time Stand Still, was announced in November 2016.

On January 16, 2018, Lifeson told The Globe and Mail that it was unlikely that Rush would play any more shows or record new material. He said, "We have no plans to tour or record anymore. We're basically done. After 41 years, we felt it was enough." In October 2018, Rolling Stone published an interview with Lee, who said:

I'd say I can't really tell you much other than that there are zero plans to tour again. As I said earlier, we're very close and talk all the time, but we don't talk about work. We're friends, and we talk about life as friends. I can't really tell you more than that, I'm afraid. I would say there's no chance of seeing Rush on tour again as Alex, Geddy, Neil. But would you see one of us or two of us or three of us? That's possible.

On January 7, 2020, Peart died at the age of 67 after a 3½-year battle with glioblastoma, a type of brain cancer. In 2021, Lee confirmed to Rolling Stone that Rush was "over" and expressed the impossibility of the band continuing without Peart: "That's finished, right? That's over. I still am very proud of what we did. I don't know what I will do again in music... I'm sure Al doesn't, whether its together, apart, or whatever. But the music of Rush is always part of us... I would never hesitate to play one of those songs in the right context. But at the same time, you have to give respect to what the three of us with Neil did together."

=== 2021–2025: Post-Rush activities ===
In a January 2021 interview with Make Weird Music, Lifeson revealed that he and Lee were talking of working together on new music, "We're both eager to get back together and kind of get back into that thing that we've done since we were 14 years old that we love to do... we work really, really well together. So we'll see what happens with that." Lifeson reiterated the status of Rush and the possibility of continuing to work with Lee in a June 2021 interview with Eddie Trunk:

"There's no way Rush will ever exist again because Neil's not here to be a part of it... that's not to say that we can't do other things and we can't do things that benefit our communities and all of that. I have lots of plans for that sort of thing that don't necessarily include Geddy. I get asked this all the time—are we gonna do this, or are we gonna do that? Who knows? All I know is we still love each other and we're still very, very good friends, and we always will be."

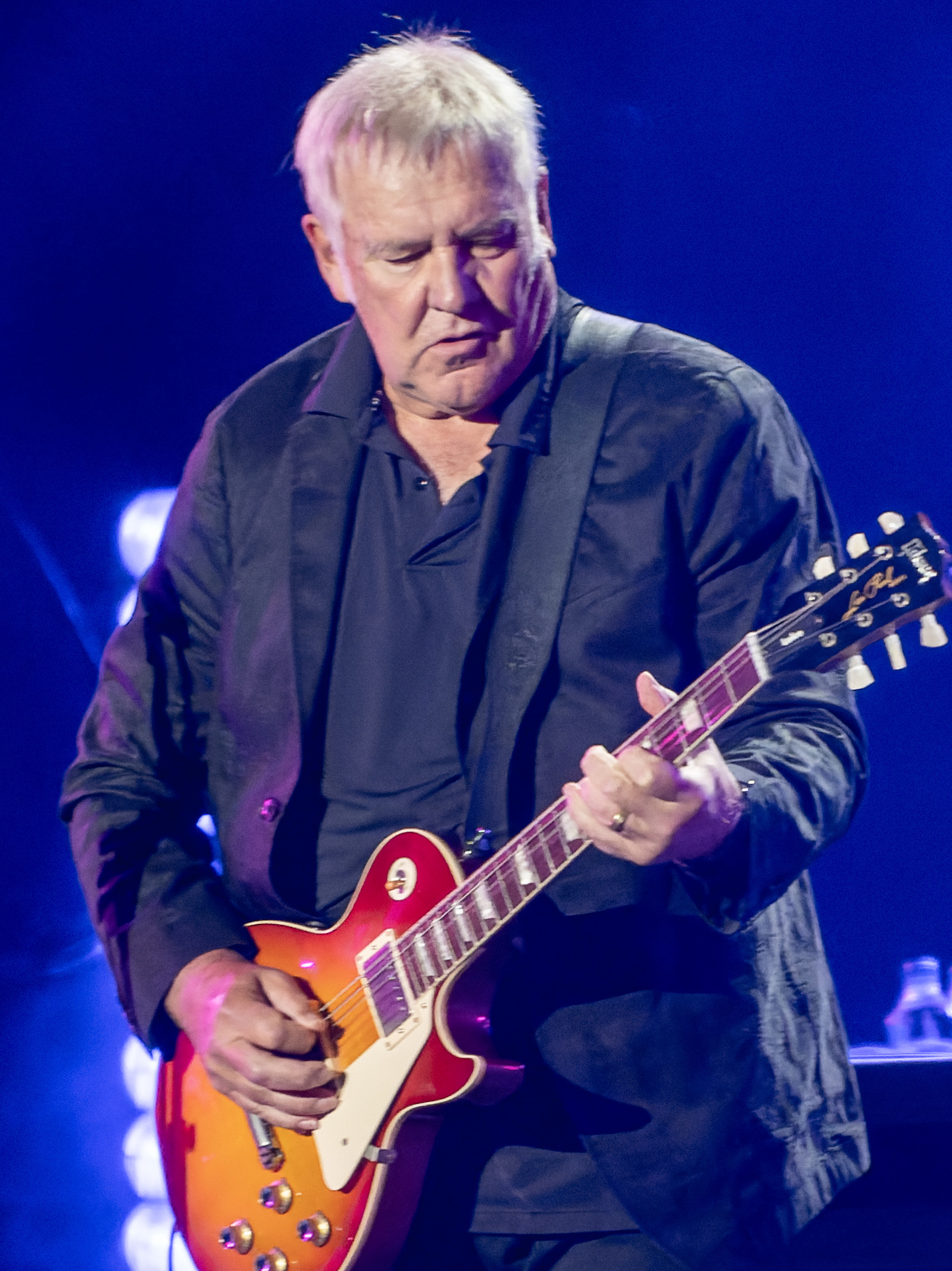
Alex Lifeson, guitarist and co-founder of Rush, pictured in 2022

In August 2022, Lee and Lifeson returned to the stage at the South Park 25th anniversary concert at Red Rocks Amphitheatre, with South Park's co-creator Matt Stone on drums to perform "Closer to the Heart" alongside the members of Primus; this was their first performance since the death of Peart. In September 2022, Lee and Lifeson performed at the London Taylor Hawkins tribute concert with Dave Grohl and Omar Hakim on drums. They performed "2112: Overture", "Working Man", and "YYZ", the latter of which was Hawkins' favourite Rush song. Later in September 2022, Lee and Lifeson played the same set at the second Taylor Hawkins Tribute show in Los Angeles. Grohl was the drummer again on "2112", Chad Smith of the Red Hot Chili Peppers joined them for "Working Man", and Danny Carey from Tool played drums for "YYZ". Those appearances fuelled speculation over a possible Rush reunion, with Paul McCartney (who attended the Hawkins tribute shows) urging Lee and Lifeson to tour again, and Smith commenting, "Those guys are so happy to be playing again... They were part of the show. They loved it and enjoyed the hell out of it. Those guys miss playing. They couldn't play anymore, Neil couldn't do it anymore, but they still want to play."

Lee told The Washington Post in November 2023 that he would not rule out performing with Lifeson again as Rush, saying, "It was nice to know that if we decide to go out, Alex and I, whether we went out as part of a new thing, or whether we just wanted to go out and play Rush as Rush, we could do that now." When asked in December 2023 by CBS News Sunday Morning if he and Lifeson had talked about continuing as Rush with a new drummer, Lee said, "Have we talked about it? Yeah. It's not impossible, but at this point, I can't guarantee it." Lifeson then expressed optimism about the band's future, stating that, "It's just not in our DNA to stop." Lifeson later said in a January 2024 interview that he was no longer interested in touring, citing arthritis and expressing doubt that he could perform as he did years ago. In May 2024, Lifeson said that he and Lee were playing songs together, but continued to rule out the possibility of ever going back on tour. He declared that he was "proud of the fact" that Rush "was over when it was over." Also in May 2024, Lee and Lifeson appeared together onstage at a Gordon Lightfoot tribute concert at Massey Hall in Toronto, where they joined Blue Rodeo performing Lightfoot's "The Way I Feel".

An anthology box set, titled Rush 50, was released on March 21, 2025. In addition to tracks from all of their studio albums, the box set contains live tracks dating back to 1974 through the band's final show in 2015, and also marked the first time that their 1973 debut single "Not Fade Away" and its B-side "You Can't Fight It" were made available on any other format. Upon the release of Rush 50, concerns emerged over the authenticity and artistic value of the artwork, as Rush fans widely speculated art director Hugh Syme may have created the Rush 50 artwork using generative artificial intelligence tools.

=== 2025–present: Reunion with new line-up ===
The reunion line-up of Rush, taken in Seattle in October 2026 during the Fifty Something tour. From left to right are Alex Lifeson, Anika Nilles, Geddy Lee and Loren Gold

On October 6, 2025, Lee and Lifeson announced that they were reforming Rush for a tour called Fifty Something which was scheduled from June to December 2026, with Anika Nilles on drums. Lee suggested that the tour would include up to two more musicians, including a backing keyboardist. Lee and Lifeson also stated that 35 songs would be performed on the tour, with the intention of varying their setlist at each show.

Lee said that he and Lifeson began thinking more seriously about a reunion tour after they travelled to a health spa in Austria. Two years prior, Lifeson had undergone a surgery that left him with gastroparesis. Lee said when they returned home, both felt willing and able to consider a small number of tour dates in limited North American cities. What started as 12 dates quickly grew into 58 shows with more cities added. When asked in an interview with The Globe and Mail if the tour would include dates outside of North America, Lee said, "We're wrestling with extending the tour into 2027. I really don't know. We'll see how that all shakes down." On February 23, 2026, Rush announced that their first tour outside of North America is set to take place from January to April 2027, starting with their first live dates in South America in seventeen years, followed by the band's first tour in Europe in fourteen years. Rush added former Chicago keyboardist Loren Gold as a touring musician in late February 2026; his arrival to the band marked the first time since second guitarist Mitch Bossi's departure from Rush in 1972 that they have performed together as a quartet rather than a trio. After the South American and European tour dates, Rush is to play five shows (advertised as "Elevate from the Norm") at the Sphere in Las Vegas in May 2027.

In January 2026, Lee revealed in an interview with Music Radar that there was a possibility of new music from Rush upon completion of the tour, saying, "Who knows what'll happen, but I suspect some music will eventually come out", and added, "It would be fun to see what [Nilles] can do in a creative situation. Like, that would be fun. But it's all speculation until it isn't." When asked in August if the new line-up of Rush had already thought of recording new music, Lee said, "No. We have enough to do. We're still trying to remember the old songs and play them."

On March 29, 2026, Rush gave a surprise performance at the 2026 Juno Awards, performing "Finding My Way" with their new line-up.

== Musical style and influences ==
Rush's music has been described as progressive rock, hard rock, heavy metal and alternative rock. The band's musical style changed substantially over the years. Its debut album was strongly influenced by British blues-based hard rock and heavy metal: an amalgam of sounds and styles from such rock bands including the Beatles, Black Sabbath, the Who, Cream, and Led Zeppelin. Rush was increasingly influenced by bands of the British progressive rock movement of the mid-1970s, especially Pink Floyd, Genesis, Yes, and Jethro Tull. In the tradition of progressive rock, Rush wrote extended songs with irregular and shifting mood, timbre, and metre, combined with lyrics influenced by Ayn Rand. In the 1980s, Rush merged their sound with trends of this period experimenting with new wave, reggae, and pop rock. The era included the band's most extensive use of instruments such as synthesizers, sequencers, and electronic percussion. In the early 1990s, the band transformed their style once again, returning to a more grounded hard rock style, and simultaneously harmonize with the alternative rock movement. The songs released during this period have been described as "hooky and radio-friendly". The band experimented with fusing heavy metal and progressive rock in "new ways" during its latter years.

== Reputation and legacy ==
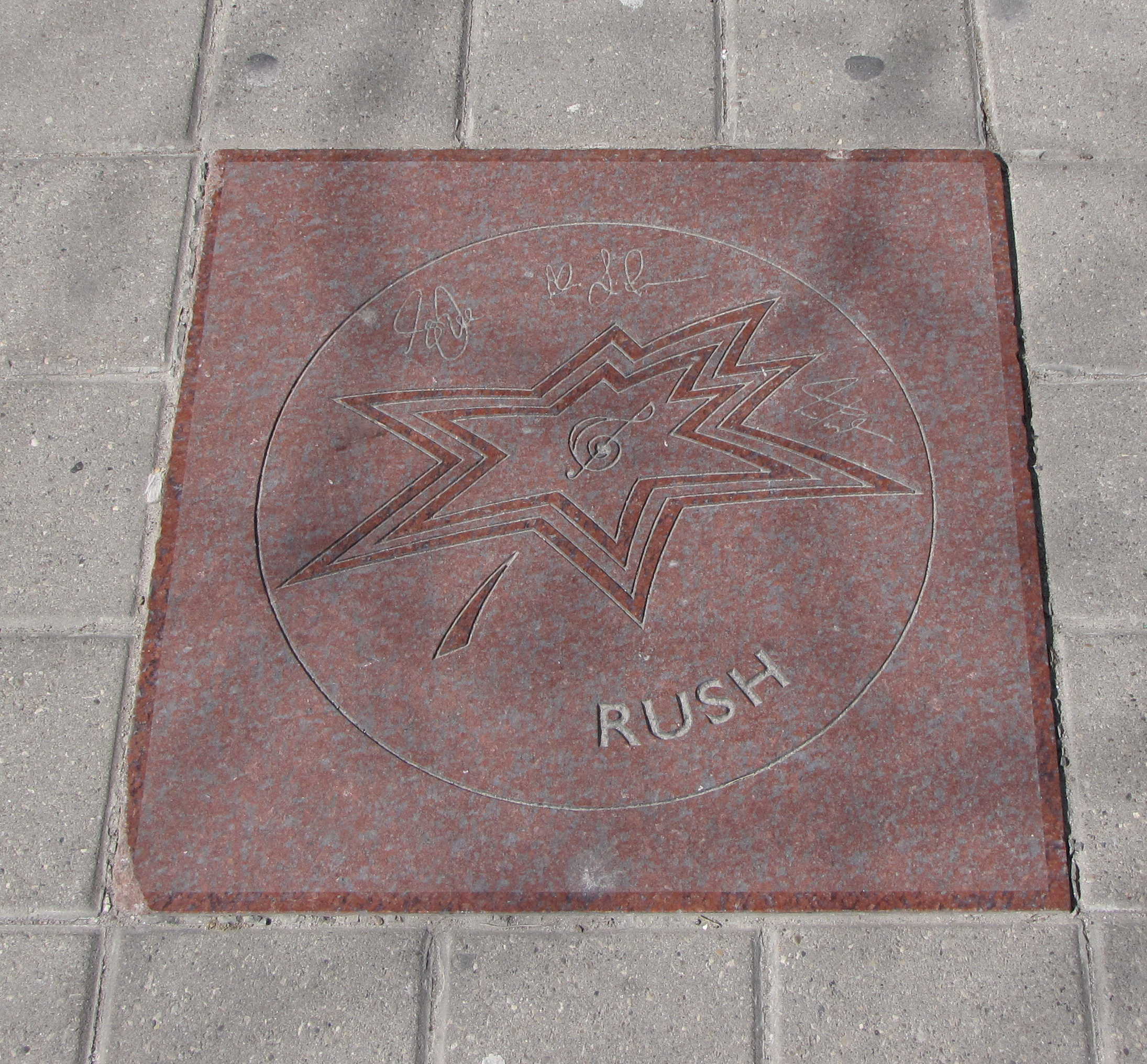
Rush's star on Canada's Walk of Fame, 2009

Rush moved through many musical styles over its 40-plus years of recording. As with many bands known for experimentation, changes sometimes drew criticism from critics and fans. Perhaps most divisive was the band's heavy usage of synthesizers and keyboards during the 1980s, particularly on Grace Under Pressure, Power Windows, and Hold Your Fire.

The members of Rush have noted that people "either love Rush or hate Rush", resulting in strong detractors and an intensely loyal fan base. In 1979, The Rolling Stone Record Guide called them "the power boogie band for the 16 magazine graduating class". A July 2008 Rolling Stone article said, "Rush fans are the Trekkies/trekkers of rock". Rush has been cited as an influence or inspiration by artists including Alice in Chains, Anthrax, Celtic Frost, the Cro-Mags, Dream Theater, Exodus, Exciter, Fates Warning, Fishbone, Foo Fighters, Iron Maiden, Jane's Addiction, King's X, Living Colour, Manic Street Preachers, Mastodon, Megadeth, Meshuggah, Metallica, No Doubt, Pearl Jam, the Pixies, Primus, Queensrÿche, Rage Against the Machine, the Red Hot Chili Peppers, Sepultura, Slayer, the Smashing Pumpkins, Elliott Smith, Soundgarden, Stone Temple Pilots, System of a Down, Testament, Tool, Venom, Voivod, and Steven Wilson. Trent Reznor of Nine Inch Nails said in the 2010 documentary Rush: Beyond the Lighted Stage that Rush is one of his favourite bands, and he has said the band's early-1980s work influenced his incorporation of keyboards and synthesizers into hard rock.

Rush's original logo, on display in Westchester, Los Angeles in 2026

Rush had been eligible for nomination into the Rock and Roll Hall of Fame since 1998. The band was nominated for entry in 2012, and their induction was announced on December 11, 2012. The 14-year gap may have been their genre. USA Today writer Edna Gundersen criticized the Hall of Fame for excluding some genres, including progressive rock. Supporters cited the band's accomplishments, including longevity, proficiency, and influence, as well as commercial sales figures and RIAA certifications. In the years before induction, Lifeson expressed his indifference toward the perceived slight, saying, "I couldn't care less. Look who's up for induction; it's a joke". In his acceptance speech on the occasion of Rush's induction into the Roll Hall of Fame on April 18, 2013, Lifeson spontaneously recited his prepared text in "blah blah blah" speech, annoying his band fellows and confusing the audience.

On April 24, 2010, the documentary Rush: Beyond the Lighted Stage, directed by Scot McFadyen and Sam Dunn, premiered at the Tribeca Film Festival. It received the Tribeca Film Festival Audience Award. The film was nominated for Best Long Form Music Video at the 53rd Grammy Awards, losing to When You're Strange, a documentary about The Doors. A limited theatrical run began on June 10, 2010, and the film was released on DVD and Blu-ray in the U.S. and Canada on June 29, 2010. The film explores the band's influence on popular music and the reasons why that influence has been underrepresented over the years. That is done via interviews with popular musicians, music industry professionals, and the band members themselves.

On June 25, 2010, Rush received a star on the Hollywood Walk of Fame at 6752 Hollywood Boulevard. Critical acclaim continued to mount for Rush in 2010 when, on September 28, Classic Rock announced that Rush would receive 2010's Living Legends award at the Marshall Classic Rock Roll of Honour Awards in the UK. The award was presented on November 10, 2010. On September 29, Billboard.com announced that Rush would also receive the 2010 Legends of Live award for significant and lasting contributions to live music and the art of performing live and reaching fans through the concert experience. The award was presented at the Billboard Live Music Awards on November 4, 2010. In 2013, the Canadian government honoured Rush with a first class "permanent" postage stamp, the equivalent of a "Forever" stamp in the US, featuring the iconic "Starman" Rush logo.

The band members were made Officers of the Order of Canada in 1996. In May 2012, the band received the Governor General's Performing Arts Award for Lifetime Artistic Achievement at a ceremony at Rideau Hall, followed the next by a gala at the National Arts Centre celebrating the award recipients. In 2017, the band members had three new microbe species named in their honour.

=== Geddy Lee ===
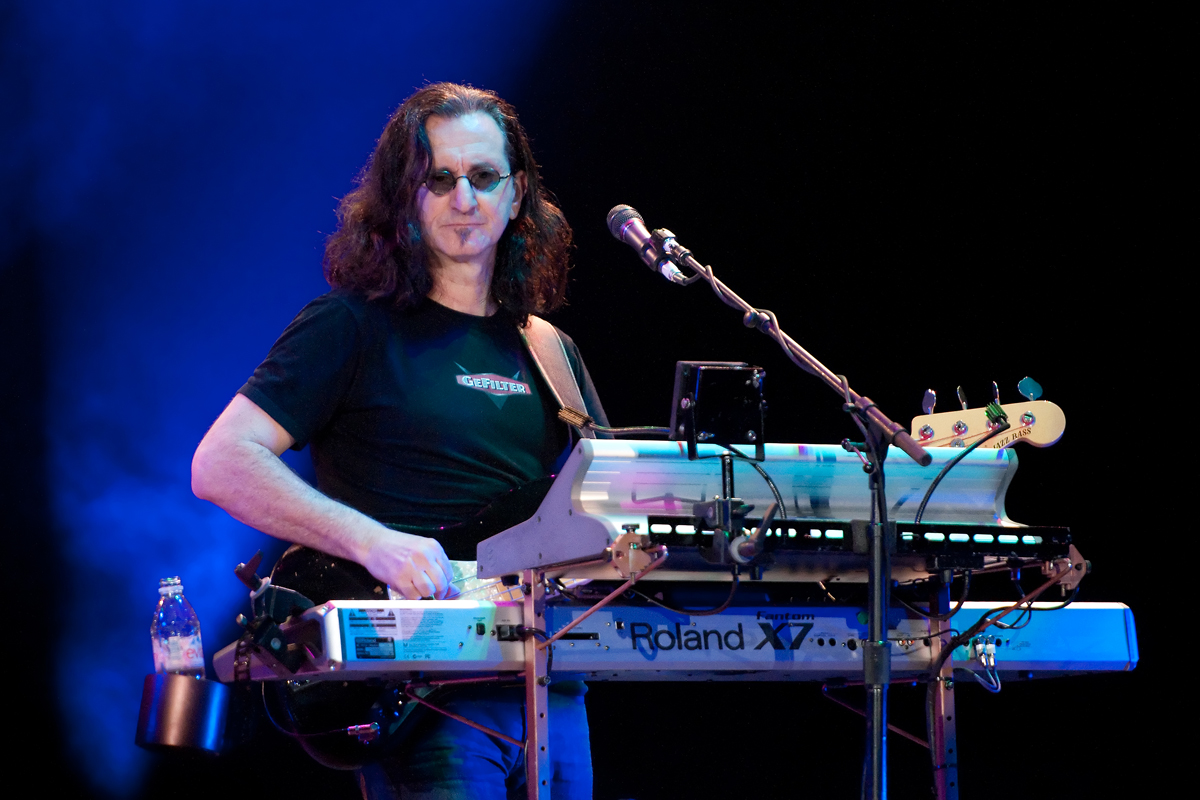
Geddy Lee in concert, 2011

Geddy Lee's high-register vocal style has always been a signature of the band–and sometimes a focal point for criticism, especially during the early years of Rush's career when his vocals were high-pitched, with a strong likeness to other singers like Robert Plant of Led Zeppelin. A review in The New York Times opined that Lee's voice "suggests a munchkin giving a sermon". Although his voice has softened, it is often described as a "wail". His instrumental abilities, on the other hand are rarely criticized. He has cited Jeff Berlin, Jack Casady, John Entwistle, Jack Bruce and Chris Squire as being the bassists who had the biggest impact on his playing style. Lee's style, technique, and ability on the bass guitar have been influential to rock and heavy metal musicians, inspiring players including Steve Harris, John Myung, Les Claypool, and Cliff Burton. Lee is able to operate various pieces of instrumentation simultaneously during concerts, most evidently when he plays bass and keyboards, sings, and triggers foot pedals as in the song "Tom Sawyer".

=== Alex Lifeson ===
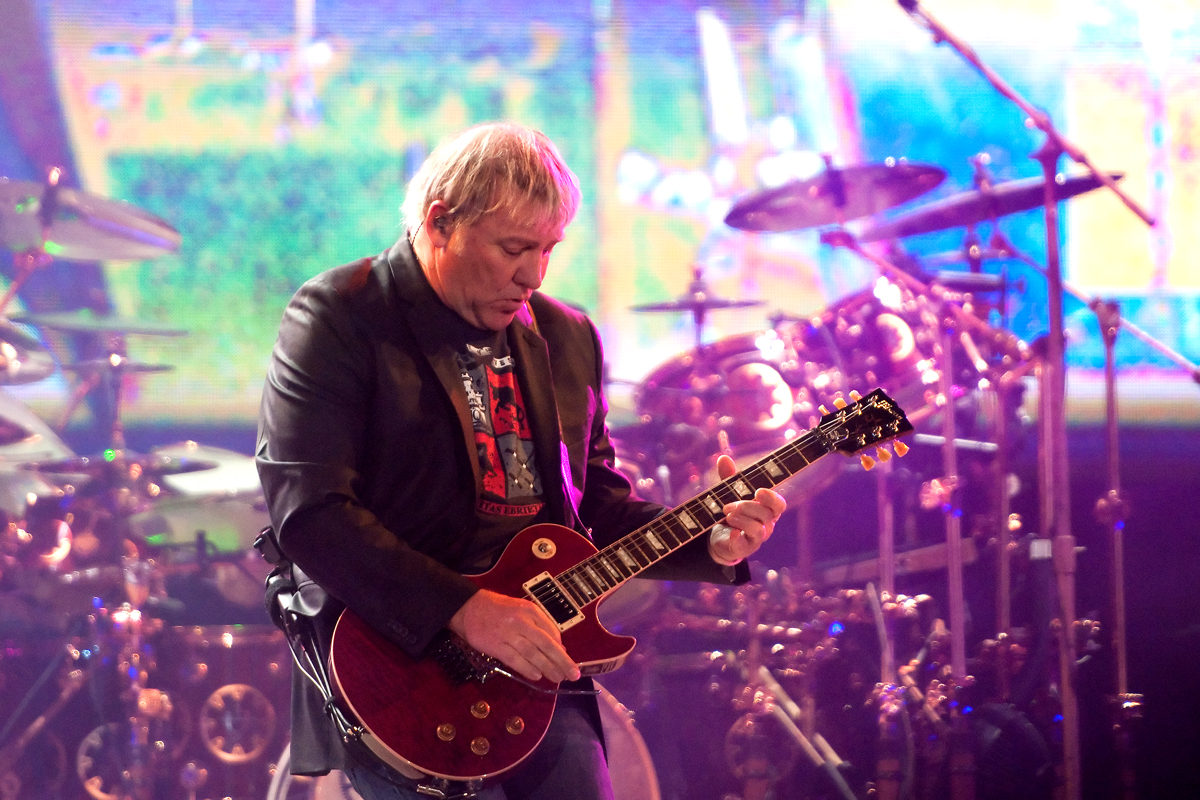
Alex Lifeson in concert, 2011

Lifeson as a guitarist is best known for his signature riffing, electronic effects and processing, unorthodox chord structures, and a copious arsenal of equipment used over the years.

During his adolescent years, he was influenced by Jimi Hendrix, Pete Townshend, Jeff Beck, Eric Clapton and Jimmy Page. Lifeson incorporated touches of Spanish and classical music into Rush's sound during the 1970s, reflecting his interest in progressive rock guitarists like Steve Hackett and Steve Howe. Adapting to Lee's expanding use of synthesizers in the 1980s, Lifeson took inspiration from guitarists like Allan Holdsworth, Andy Summers of The Police and The Edge of U2, who gave him models for rethinking the guitar's role in Rush's music. Lifeson's guitar returned to the forefront in the 1990s, and especially on the keyboard-less Vapor Trails (2002). During live performances, he was responsible for cuing various guitar effects, the use of bass-pedal synthesizers and backing vocals. He occasionally has played keyboard synthesizers live.

=== Neil Peart ===
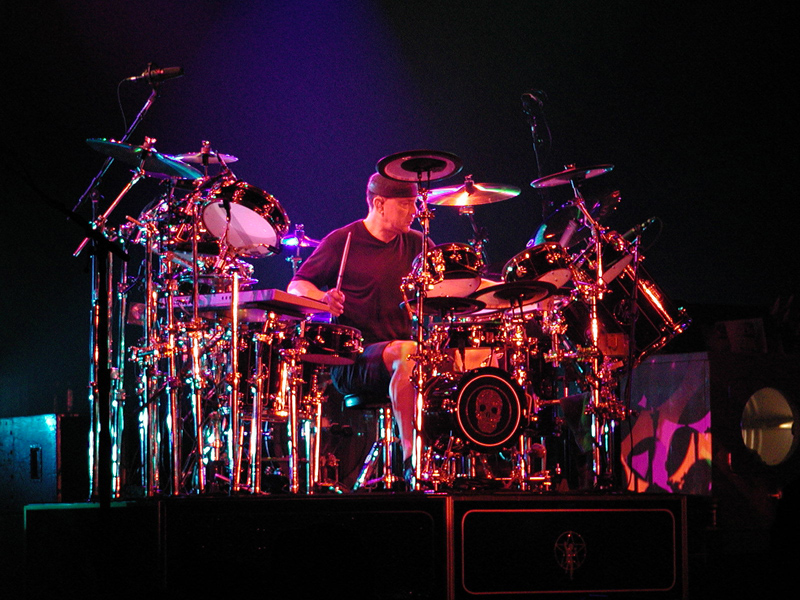
Neil Peart in concert, 2004

Peart has been voted the greatest rock drummer by music fans, critics and fellow musicians, according to Drummerworld. He was also regarded as one of the finest practitioners of the in-concert drum solo. Initially inspired by Keith Moon, Peart absorbed the influence of other rock drummers from the 1960s and 1970s such as Ginger Baker, Carmine Appice, and John Bonham. Incorporation of unusual instruments (for rock drummers of the time) such as the glockenspiel and tubular bells, along with several standard kit elements, helped create a highly varied setup. Continually modified, Peart's drumkit offered an enormous array of percussion instruments for sonic diversity. For two decades, Peart honed his technique; each new Rush album introduced an expanded percussive vocabulary. In the 1990s, he reinvented his style with the help of drum coach Freddie Gruber.

Peart served as Rush's primary lyricist, attracting attention over the years for his eclectic style. During the band's early years, Peart's lyrics were largely fantasy/science fiction-focused, though after 1980 he focused more on social, emotional, and humanitarian issues. In 2007, he was placed second on Blender magazine's list of the "40 Worst Lyricists in Rock". In contrast, AllMusic has called Peart "one of rock's most accomplished lyricists", Gibson.com describes Rush's lyrics as "great", and others have called the lyrics "brilliant".

== Sales ==
Rush has released 24 gold records and 14 platinum records (including three multi-platinum), placing them third behind the Beatles and the Rolling Stones for the most consecutive gold or platinum studio albums by a rock band in the United States. As of 2005, Rush had sold over 26 million copies of their albums in the US (ranked 88th among recording acts) and 40 million worldwide. As of April 2021, Moving Pictures was the band's highest-selling album at over 5 million units, having been certified 5× platinum by the RIAA.

The band dropped out of the public eye for five years after the gold-selling Test for Echo peaked at No. 5 on the Billboard 200 chart and the band being relegated almost solely to classic rock stations in the US, Vapor Trails reached No. 6 on the Billboard 200 in its first week of release in 2002, with 108,000 copies sold. It has sold about 343,000 units to date. The subsequent Vapor Trails tour grossed over $24 million and included the largest audience ever to see a headlining Rush show: 60,000 fans in São Paulo, Brazil.

Rush's triple-CD live album, Rush in Rio (2003), was certified gold, marking the fourth decade in which a Rush album had been released and certified at least gold. In 2004, Feedback cracked the top 20 on the Billboard 200 and received radio airplay. The band's 2007 album, Snakes & Arrows, debuted at No. 3 (just one position shy of Rush's highest-peaking albums, Counterparts (1993) and Clockwork Angels (2012), which both debuted at No. 2) on the Billboard 200, selling about 93,000 in its first week of release. That marks the 13th Rush studio album to appear in the Top 20 and the band's 27th album to appear on the chart. The album also debuted at No. 1 on the Billboard's Top Rock Albums chart, and, when the album was released on the MVI format a month later, peaked at No. 1 on the Top Internet Albums chart.

The tours in support of Snakes & Arrows in 2007 and 2008 accrued $21 million and $18.3 million respectively, earning Rush the No. 6 and 8 spots among the summers' rock concerts.

== Live performances ==
The members of Rush shared a strong work ethic, desiring to accurately recreate songs from their albums when playing live performances. To achieve this goal, beginning in the late 1980s, Rush included a capacious rack of digital samplers in their concert equipment to recreate the sounds of non-traditional instruments, accompaniments, vocal harmonies, and other sound "events" in real time to match the sounds on the studio versions of the songs. In live performances, the band members shared duties throughout most songs. Each member had one or more MIDI controllers, which were loaded with different sounds for each song, and they used available limbs to trigger the sounds while simultaneously playing their primary instrument(s). With this technology the group was able to present their arrangements in a live setting with the level of complexity and fidelity fans had come to expect, and without the need to resort to the use of backing tracks or employing an additional band member during their initial run. The members' coordinated use of pedal keyboards and other electronic triggers to "play" sampled instruments and audio events was subtly visible in their live performances, especially on the R30: 30th Anniversary World Tour, their 2005 concert DVD.

A staple of Rush's concerts was Neil Peart's drum solos, which included a basic framework of routines connected by sections of improvisation, making each performance unique. Each successive tour saw his solos become more advanced, with some routines dropped in favour of newer, more complex ones. Since the mid-1980s, Peart used MIDI trigger pads to elicit sounds sampled from various pieces of acoustic percussion that would otherwise consume far too much stage area, such as a marimba, harp, temple blocks, triangles, glockenspiel, orchestra bells, tubular bells, and vibraslap, as well as other, more esoteric percussion.

One prominent feature of Rush's concerts were props on stage, at one point called "diversions". These props have included washing machines, vintage popcorn poppers, animations, and inflatable rabbits emerging from giant hats behind the band. Starting in the mid-'90s, the props often took Lee's side of the stage (stage left) as a way to balance out the amp stacks on Lifeson's side (stage right) when Lee opted to use a venue's house system instead of amps.

== Philanthropy ==
Rush actively participated in philanthropic causes. The band were one of several hometown favourites to play Molson Canadian Rocks for Toronto, also dubbed SARStock, at Downsview Park in Toronto on July 30, 2003, with an attendance of over half a million people. The concert benefited the Toronto economy after the SARS outbreaks earlier in the year. The band has continued to be interested in promoting human rights. They donated $100,000 to the Canadian Museum for Human Rights after a concert they held in Winnipeg, Manitoba on May 24, 2008.

On July 24, 2013, Rush performed a benefit concert in Red Deer, Alberta at the ENMAX Centrium, with all proceeds going to the Canadian Red Cross to help victims of the 2013 flooding that devastated many regions of southern Alberta. The original venue for the show, the Scotiabank Saddledome in Calgary was heavily damaged from the flooding and was unavailable for the concert date as originally planned. In 2015 Rush was awarded the Juno Allan Waters Humanitarian Award.

Individual members of Rush have also been a part of philanthropic causes. Hughes & Kettner, zenTera, and TriAmp electronics have been endorsed and used by Lifeson for many years. A custom signature amplifier was engineered by Lifeson and released in April 2005 with the stipulation that UNICEF receive a $50 donation for every Alex Lifeson Signature TriAmp sold. Lee, a longtime fan of baseball, donated 200 baseballs signed by famous Negro league players including Willie Mays, Hank Aaron, and Josh Gibson, to the Negro Leagues Baseball Museum in Kansas City, Missouri in June 2008. In late 2009, Lee and Lifeson launched an auction for their initiative "Grapes Under Pressure", in support of "Grapes for Humanity", a charity. The auction consisted of items from the band such as autographed guitars, cymbals and basses. There were autographs by band members from Depeche Mode, Tool, the Fray, Judas Priest, Pearl Jam and other bands in addition to a rare Epiphone guitar with signatures from Ricky, Julian, and Bubbles from Trailer Park Boys. The band is featured on the album Songs for Tibet, appearing with other celebrities as an initiative to support Tibet and Dalai Lama Tenzin Gyatso. The album, made downloadable on August 5, 2008, via iTunes, was released commercially on August 12, 2008.

Rush have also been big supporters of Little Kids Rock, a nonprofit which works to restore and revitalize music education programmes in disadvantaged US public schools. Musician's Friend, Sabian, and Rush teamed to help Little Kids Rock provide percussion to public schools nationwide. They donated $500 of the proceeds from each Neil Peart Paragon Cymbal Pack sold, each of which came with a free splash cymbal personally autographed by Peart. The marketing initiative raised over $50,000 for Little Kids Rock.

== Band members ==
=== Current ===
- Alex Lifeson – electric and acoustic guitars, backing vocals, synthesizers, keyboards (1968–2015, 2025–present)
- Geddy Lee – lead and backing vocals, bass, keyboards, synthesizers, guitar (1968–1969, 1969–2015, 2025–present), lyrics (1973–1974)

=== Touring ===
- Anika Nilles – drums, percussion (2025–present)
- Loren Gold – keyboards, backing vocals (2026–present)

=== Former ===
- Jeff Jones – lead vocals, bass (1968)
- John Rutsey – drums, percussion, backing vocals (1968–1974; died 2008), lyrics (1968–1973)
- Joe Perna – bass, lead and backing vocals (1969)
- Lindy Young – keyboards, backing and lead vocals, guitars, percussion, harmonica (1969)
- Bob Vopni – guitars, backing vocals (1969)
- Mitch Bossi – guitars, backing vocals (1971–1972)
- Neil Peart – drums, percussion, lyrics (1974–2015; died 2020)

== Discography ==
Studio albums

- Rush (1974)
- Fly by Night (1975)
- Caress of Steel (1975)
- 2112 (1976)
- A Farewell to Kings (1977)
- Hemispheres (1978)
- Permanent Waves (1980)
- Moving Pictures (1981)
- Signals (1982)
- Grace Under Pressure (1984)
- Power Windows (1985)
- Hold Your Fire (1987)
- Presto (1989)
- Roll the Bones (1991)
- Counterparts (1993)
- Test for Echo (1996)
- Vapor Trails (2002)
- Snakes & Arrows (2007)
- Clockwork Angels (2012)

== Tours ==
Sources: Rush.com and Rush: Wandering the Face of the Earth

=== Concert tours ===
- Rush Tour (1974–1975)
- Fly by Night Tour (1975)
- Caress of Steel Tour (1975–1976)
- 2112 Tour (1976)
- All the World's a Stage Tour (1976–1977)
- A Farewell to Kings Tour (1977–1978)
- Archives Tour (1978)
- Hemispheres Tour (1978–1979)
- Permanent Waves Tour (1979–1980)
- Moving Pictures Tour (1980–1981)
- Exit... Stage Left Tour (1981)
- Signals Tour (1982–1983)
- Grace Under Pressure Tour (1983–1984)
- Power Windows Tour (1985–1986)
- Hold Your Fire Tour (1987–1988)
- Presto Tour (1990)
- Roll the Bones Tour (1991–1992)
- Counterparts Tour (1994)
- Test for Echo Tour (1996–1997)
- Vapor Trails Tour (2002)
- R30: 30th Anniversary Tour (2004)
- Snakes & Arrows Tour (2007–2008)
- Time Machine Tour (2010–2011)
- Clockwork Angels Tour (2012–2013)
- R40 Live Tour (2015)
- Fifty Something (2026–2027)

=== Residencies ===
- Elevate from the Norm (2027)

== See also ==
- List of songs recorded by Rush
- List of Rush instrumentals

== Notes and references ==
=== References ===
Sources

- Banasiewicz, Bill (1988). Rush: Visions: The Official Biography. Omnibus Press. ISBN 0-7119-1162-2.
- Daly, Skip; Hansen, Eric (2019). Rush: Wandering the Face of the Earth – The Official Touring History. Insight Editions. ISBN 978-1-68383-450-2.
- Popoff, Martin (2004). Contents Under Pressure: 30 Years of Rush at Home and Away. ECW Press. ISBN 978-1-550-22678-2.
- Marsh, Dave (1979). The Rolling Stone Record Guide : reviews and ratings of almost 10,000 currently available rock, pop, soul, country, blues, jazz, and gospel albums (1st ed.). New York: Random House. ISBN 0-394-41096-3.
