= Rush discography =

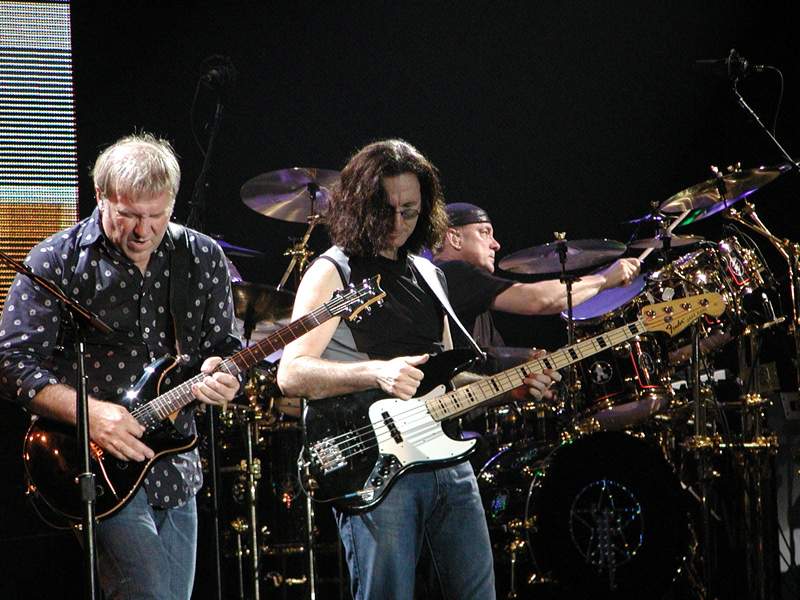
- Alex Lifeson, Geddy Lee, and Neil Peart of Rush; 30th Anniversary tour photo, 2004
- Studio albums: 19
- Extended plays: 2
- Live albums: 11
- Compilation albums: 12
- Singles: 38
- Video albums: 13
- Music videos: 34
- Box sets: 14

Rush is a Canadian rock band originally formed in August 1968 in the Willowdale neighbourhood of Toronto, Ontario. For the overwhelming majority of its existence, the band consisted of bassist, keyboardist and lead vocalist Geddy Lee, guitarist Alex Lifeson and drummer and lyricist Neil Peart. The band achieved this definitive form when Neil Peart replaced original drummer, John Rutsey, in July 1974.

The band released its eponymous debut album in March 1974. Since then, they have achieved 24 gold records and 14 platinum (3 multi-platinum) records. According to the RIAA, Rush's sales statistics also place them third behind the Beatles and the Rolling Stones for the most consecutive gold or platinum albums by a rock band. As of 2022, Rush ranks 84th in US album sales with 26 million units sold.

One of Rush's more recent releases is the Grace Under Pressure: Super Deluxe box set, which was released on March 13, 2026. The most recent box set was preceded by similar anniversary releases of 2112 on December 16, 2016, A Farewell to Kings on December 1, 2017, Hemispheres on November 16, 2018, Permanent Waves on May 29, 2020, Moving Pictures on April 15, 2022, Signals on April 28, 2023, and Rush 50 on March 21, 2025.

== Albums ==
=== Studio albums ===
Title	Album details	Peak chart positions										Certifications (sales thresholds)
Title	Album details	CAN	FIN	GER	IRE	NLD	NOR	POL	SWE	UK	US	Certifications (sales thresholds)
Rush	Released: March 18, 1974; Label: Moon; Format: CD, CS, LP, 8-track	86	—	—	—	—	—	—	—	—	105	MC: Gold; RIAA: Gold; Pro-Música Brasil: Gold
Fly by Night	Released: February 14, 1975; Label: Mercury; Format: CD, CS, LP, 8-track	9	—	—	—	—	—	—	—	—	113	MC: Platinum; RIAA: Platinum
Caress of Steel	Released: September 24, 1975; Label: Mercury; Format: CD, CS, LP, 8-track	60	—	—	—	—	—	—	—	—	148	MC: Gold; RIAA: Gold
2112	Released: March 24, 1976; Label: Mercury; Format: CD, CS, LP, 8-track	5	—	—	—	—	—	—	33	—	61	MC: 2× Platinum; BPI: Gold; RIAA: 4× Platinum
A Farewell to Kings	Released: August 29, 1977; Label: Mercury; Format: CD, CS, LP, 8-track	11	—	—	—	—	—	—	41	22	33	MC: Platinum; BPI: Gold; RIAA: Platinum
Hemispheres	Released: October 24, 1978; Label: Mercury; Format: CD, CS, LP, 8-track	14	—	—	—	—	—	—	—	14	47	MC: Platinum; BPI: Silver; RIAA: Platinum
Permanent Waves	Released: January 14, 1980; Label: Mercury; Format: CD, CS, LP, 8-track	3	—	—	—	38	21	—	26	3	4	MC: Platinum; BPI: Gold; RIAA: Platinum
Moving Pictures	Released: February 12, 1981; Label: Mercury; Format: CD, CS, LP, 8-track	1	—	—	—	19	34	—	32	3	3	MC: 4× Platinum; BPI: Gold; RIAA: 5× Platinum
Signals	Released: September 9, 1982; Label: Mercury; Format: CD, CS, LP, 8-track	1	—	—	—	31	33	—	19	3	10	MC: Platinum; BPI: Silver; RIAA: Platinum
Grace Under Pressure	Released: April 12, 1984; Label: Mercury; Format: CD, CS, LP, 8-track (record club release)	4	14	43	—	27	—	—	18	5	10	MC: Platinum; BPI: Silver; RIAA: Platinum
Power Windows	Released: October 11, 1985; Label: Mercury; Format: CD, CS, LP, 8-track (record club release)	5	17	—	—	44	—	—	26	9	10	MC: Platinum; BPI: Silver; RIAA: Platinum
Hold Your Fire	Released: September 8, 1987; Label: Mercury; Format: CD, CS, LP	9	9	34	—	40	—	—	21	10	13	MC: Platinum; BPI: Silver; RIAA: Gold
Presto	Released: November 17, 1989; Label: Atlantic; Format: CD, CS, LP	7	22	60	—	70	—	—	—	27	16	MC: Platinum; BPI: Silver; RIAA: Gold
Roll the Bones	Released: September 3, 1991; Label: Atlantic; Format: CD, CS, LP	11	9	35	—	38	—	—	31	10	3	MC: Platinum; RIAA: Platinum
Counterparts	Released: October 19, 1993; Label: Atlantic; Format: CD, CS, LP	6	18	88	—	56	—	—	45	14	2	MC: Platinum; RIAA: Gold
Test for Echo	Released: September 10, 1996; Label: Atlantic; Format: CD, CS, LP	3	9	45	—	53	—	—	26	25	5	MC: Gold; RIAA: Gold
Vapor Trails	Released: May 14, 2002; Label: Atlantic; Format: CD, CS, LP	3	11	20	—	47	—	—	18	38	6	MC: Gold
Snakes & Arrows	Released: May 1, 2007; Label: Atlantic; Format: CD, LP	3	4	29	80	16	13	41	6	13	3	MC: Gold
Clockwork Angels	Released: June 8, 2012; Label: Roadrunner; Format: CD, LP	1	4	11	71	11	4	9	8	21	2	MC: Gold
"—" denotes releases that did not chart.

=== Live albums ===
Title	Album details	Peak chart positions										Certifications (sales thresholds)
Title	Album details	CAN	FIN	GER	IRE	NLD	NOR	SWE	UK		US	Certifications (sales thresholds)
Title	Album details	CAN	FIN	GER	IRE	NLD	NOR	SWE	Main	R&M	US	Certifications (sales thresholds)
All the World's a Stage	Released: September 29, 1976; Label: Anthem; Format: CD, CS, LP, 8-track	6	—	—	—	—	—	—	—	—	40	MC: Platinum; BPI: Silver; RIAA: Platinum
Exit...Stage Left	Released: October 29, 1981; Label: Anthem; Format: CD, CS, LP, 8-track	7	—	—	—	19	28	—	6	—	10	MC: Platinum; BPI: Silver; RIAA: Platinum
A Show of Hands	Released: January 9, 1989; Label: Anthem; Format: CD, CS, LP	33	9	35	—	38	—	28	12	—	21	MC: Platinum; RIAA: Gold
Different Stages	Released: November 10, 1998; Label: Anthem; Format: CD, CS	12	—	—	—	—	—	—	121	—	35	MC: Platinum; RIAA: Gold
Rush in Rio	Released: October 21, 2003; Label: Anthem; Format: CD, LP	—	—	—	—	—	—	—	139	—	33	MC: Gold; RIAA: Gold
R30: 30th Anniversary World Tour	Released: November 22, 2005; Label: Anthem; Format: CD	—	—	—	—	—	—	—	—	—	—	
Snakes & Arrows Live	Released: April 15, 2008; Label: Anthem; Format: CD	8	—	63	—	36	—	42	70	—	18	
Grace Under Pressure Tour	Released: August 11, 2009; Label: Anthem; Format: CD	—	—	—	—	—	—	—	—	—	—	
Time Machine 2011: Live in Cleveland	Released: November 8, 2011; Label: Roadrunner; Format: CD, LP	59	—	58	—	—	—	—	70	—	54	
ABC 1974	Released: December 17, 2011; Label: Back On Black; Format: CD	—	—	—	—	—	—	—	— (Note: Although never cracking any all-genre chart from the Official Charts Company, ABC 1974 made the UK Independent Albums chart for a week at number 23.)	—	—	
Clockwork Angels Tour	Released: November 19, 2013; Label: Roadrunner; Format: CD, LP	75	—	82	—	87	—	—	65	—	33	
Spirit of the Airwaves	Released: March 10, 2014; Label: Black on Black; Format: CD, Vinyl	—	—	—	—	—	—	—	— (Note: Spirit of the Airwaves landed at number 47 on the Independent Albums chart.)	19	—	
The Lady Gone Electric: New York City 1974	Released: October 16, 2015; Label: Black on Black; Format: Vinyl	—	—	—	—	—	—	—	—	36	—	
R40 Live	Released: November 20, 2015; Label: Anthem; Format: CD	30	—	49	—	54	—	—	47	—	24	
2112 in Concert	Released: February 2020; Label: Coda Records; Format: Vinyl	—	—	—	—	—	—	—	— (Note: 2112 in Concert landed at number 32 on the Official Vinyl Albums Chart.)	—	—	
An Evening with 1997	Released: April 3, 2020; Label: Leftfield Media; Format: 2×CD	—	—	—	—	—	—	—	— (Note: An Evening with 1997 landed at number 46 on the Independent Albums chart.)	—	—	
"—" denotes releases that did not chart.

=== Compilation albums ===
Title	Album details	Peak chart positions				Certifications (sales thresholds)
Title	Album details	CAN	GER	UK	US	Certifications (sales thresholds)
Rush Through Time	Released: May 1979; Label: Mercury; Format: LP	—	—	—	—	
Chronicles	Released: September 4, 1990; Label: Anthem; Format: CD, CS, LP	38	—	42	51	MC: 2× Platinum; RIAA: 2× Platinum
Retrospective I	Released: May 6, 1997; Label: Anthem; Format: CD, CS	—	—	—	—	
Retrospective II	Released: June 3, 1997; Label: Anthem; Format: CD, CS	—	—	—	—	
The Spirit of Radio: Greatest Hits 1974–1987	Released: February 11, 2003; Label: Anthem; Format: CD	17	—	167	45 (Note: The peak position for The Spirit of Radio: Greatest Hits 1974–1987 was on the week of January 25, 2020, shortly after Peart's death. Before then, its peak position was number 63.)	BPI: Gold; RIAA: Gold
Gold	Released: April 25, 2006; Label: Anthem; Format: CD	127	—	—	—	
Retrospective III: 1989–2008	Released: March 3, 2009; Label: Anthem; Format: CD	—	—	160	47	
Working Men	Released: November 17, 2009; Label: Anthem; Format: CD	—	—	—	—	
Time Stand Still: The Collection	Released: March 30, 2010; Label: Universal; Format: CD	—	—	—	—	
Icon	Released: August 31, 2010; Label: Universal; Format: CD, LP	—	—	—	—	
Icon 2	Released: July 29, 2011; Label: Island; Format: CD	—	—	—	—	
Rush 50	Released: March 21, 2025; Label: Mercury; Format: 4×CD	—	14	—	160	
"—" denotes releases that did not chart.

== Videos ==
=== Video albums ===
Year	Title	Chart positions						Certifications
Year	Title	US	SWE	FIN	SWI	NLD	UK	Certifications
1982	Exit...Stage Left: Released: February 13, 1982; Label: Anthem; Format: Betamax, CED, DVD, LD, VHS	—	—	—	—	—	—	RIAA: Gold
1985	Through the Camera Eye: Released: July 17, 1985; Label: Anthem; Format: Betamax, LD, VHS	16	—	—	—	—	—	
1986	Grace Under Pressure Tour: Released: March 28, 1986; Label: Anthem; Format: Betamax, DVD, LD, VHS	9	—	—	—	—	—	
1989	A Show of Hands: Released: February 21, 1989; Label: Anthem; Format: DVD, LD, VHS	2	—	—	—	—	—	MC: Platinum; RIAA: Platinum
1990	Chronicles: Released: October 23, 1990; Label: Anthem; Format: DVD, LD, VHS	13	—	2	—	—	23	MC: Gold; RIAA: Platinum
2003	Rush in Rio: Released: October 21, 2003; Label: Anthem; Format: DVD	1	8	5	—	19	3	MC: Diamond; BPI: Platinum; RIAA: 7× Platinum
2005	R30: 30th Anniversary World Tour: Released: November 22, 2005; Label: Anthem; Format: BD, DVD	2	3	3	—	24	2	MC: 8× Platinum; BPI: Gold; RIAA: 5× Platinum
2006	Rush Replay X3: Released: June 13, 2006; Label: Anthem; Format: DVD	1	8	3	—	10	2	MC: 5× Platinum
2008	Snakes & Arrows Live: Released: April 14, 2008; Label: Anthem; Format: BD, DVD	1	5	3	—	3	5	MC: 5× Platinum; RIAA: 2× Platinum
2011	Time Machine 2011: Live in Cleveland: Released: November 8, 2011; Label: Anthem; Format: BD, DVD	1	1	3	—	10	2	RIAA: 2× Platinum
2013	Clockwork Angels Tour: Released: November 19, 2013; Label: Anthem; Format: BD, DVD	1	3	2	8	8	2	MC: 3× Platinum; RIAA: Platinum
2014	R40 (6 Blu-Ray / 10 DVD Box Set): Released: November 11, 2014; Label: Anthem; Format: BD, DVD	2	—	—	—	—	—	
2015	R40 Live: Released: November 20, 2015; Label: Anthem; Format: BD, DVD	2	5	2	—	4	—	
"—" denotes releases that did not chart.

=== Music videos ===
Year	Title	Album
1975	"Fly by Night"	Fly by Night
1975	"Anthem"	Fly by Night
1977	"Closer to the Heart"	A Farewell to Kings
1977	"A Farewell to Kings"	A Farewell to Kings
1977	"Xanadu"	A Farewell to Kings
1978	"Circumstances"	Hemispheres
1978	"The Trees"	Hemispheres
1978	"La Villa Strangiato"	Hemispheres
1981	"Limelight"	Moving Pictures
1981	"Tom Sawyer"	Moving Pictures
1981	"Vital Signs"	Moving Pictures
1982	"Subdivisions"	Signals
1983	"Countdown"	Signals
1984	"Distant Early Warning"	Grace Under Pressure
1984	"Afterimage"	Grace Under Pressure
1984	"The Body Electric"	Grace Under Pressure
1984	"The Enemy Within"	Grace Under Pressure
1985	"The Big Money"	Power Windows
1986	"Mystic Rhythms"	Power Windows
1987	"Time Stand Still" (with Aimee Mann)	Hold Your Fire
1988	"Lock and Key"	Hold Your Fire
1989	"Show Don't Tell"	Presto
1990	"The Pass"	Presto
1990	"Superconductor"	Presto
1992	"Roll the Bones"	Roll the Bones
1993	"Stick It Out"	Counterparts
1994	"Nobody's Hero"	Counterparts
1996	"Half the World"	Test for Echo
1997	"Driven"	Test for Echo
2007	"Far Cry"	Snakes & Arrows
2007	"Malignant Narcissism"	Snakes & Arrows
2012	"Headlong Flight" (Lyric Video)	Clockwork Angels
2012	"The Wreckers" (Lyric Video)	Clockwork Angels
2020	"The Spirit of Radio"	Permanent Waves
2022	"YYZ"	Moving Pictures

== Extended plays and singles ==
=== EP ===
Title	EP details	Peak chart positions		
Title	EP details	CAN	UK	US
Feedback	Released: June 29, 2004; Label: Atlantic; Format: CD, LP	5	68	19
Cygnus X-1 (limited-edition EP)	Released: April 22, 2017; Label: Universal Music Enterprises; Format: LP	—	— (Note: Given that each side consisted of one track, the Official Charts Company considered the Cygnus X-1 Record Store Day release a single, as it peaked at number 25 on the Physical Singles Chart and Vinyl Singles Chart.)	— (Note: The Cygnus X-1 EP landed at number 84 on the Top Current Album Sales chart, which is only for albums newer than 18 months.)
"—" denotes releases that did not chart.

=== Singles ===
Year	Song	Chart positions				Album
Year	Song	CAN	US	US Main	UK	Album
1973	"Not Fade Away" b/w "You Can't Fight It"	88				Non-album single
1974	"Finding My Way" b/w "Need Some Love"	—	—			Rush
1974	"In the Mood" b/w "What You're Doing"	31	—			Rush
1975	"Fly by Night" b/w "Anthem" (Note: b/w Best I Can (NL))	45	—			Fly by Night
1975	"Return of the Prince" b/w "I Think I'm Going Bald"	—				Caress of Steel
1975	"Lakeside Park" b/w "Bastille Day"	—	—			Caress of Steel
1976	"The Twilight Zone" b/w "Lessons"	—	—			2112
1976	"Fly by Night / In the Mood" (live medley) b/w "Something for Nothing" (live)	—	88			All the World's a Stage
1977	"Making Memories": "The Temples of Syrinx" (Note: A and B sides reversed in the US)	—	—			Fly by Night
1977	"Closer to the Heart" b/w "Madrigal" (Note: b/w Bastille Day/Temples of Syrinx (UK))	44	76		36	A Farewell to Kings
1978	"Cinderella Man" b/w "A Farewell to Kings"	—				A Farewell to Kings
1979	"Circumstances": "The Trees" (Note: A and B sides reversed in the US and NL)	—	—			Hemispheres
1980	"The Spirit of Radio" b/w "Circumstances" (Note: b/w The Trees (UK) Different Strings (JPN))	22	51		13	Permanent Waves
1980	"Entre Nous" b/w "Different Strings"	94	110			Permanent Waves
1981	"Limelight" b/w "YYZ"	18	55	4		Moving Pictures
1981	"Vital Signs" b/w "A Passage to Bangkok" (Note: b/w Limelight (ESP))			—	41	Moving Pictures
1981	"Tom Sawyer" b/w "Witch Hunt"	24	44	8		Moving Pictures
1981	"Tom Sawyer" (live) b/w "A Passage to Bangkok" (live)			42	25	Exit...Stage Left
1981	"Closer to the Heart" (live) b/w "Freewill" (live) (Note: b/w The Trees (live) (UK))	—	69	21	76	Exit...Stage Left
1982	"New World Man" b/w "Vital Signs" (live)	1	21	1	42	Signals
1982	"Subdivisions" b/w "Countdown" (Note: b/w Red Barchetta (live) (UK))	36	105	5	53	Signals
1983	"Countdown": "New World Man" (Note: UK double A-side)			—	36	Signals
1984	"Distant Early Warning" b/w "Between the Wheels"	—		3		Grace Under Pressure
1984	"The Body Electric" b/w "Between the Wheels" (Note: b/w The Analog Kid (UK))	86 —	105 —	23; 39	56 —	Grace Under Pressure
1984	"Red Sector A" b/w "Red Lenses"	—		21		Grace Under Pressure
1984	"Afterimage" (Note: released in Japan) b/w "The Body Electric"			—		Grace Under Pressure
1985	"The Big Money" b/w "Red Sector A" (live) (Note: b/w Territories (UK))	52	45	4	46	Power Windows
1986	"Mystic Rhythms" b/w "Emotion Detector"	—	—	21		Power Windows
1987	"Time Stand Still" b/w "High Water" (Note: b/w Force Ten (UK))	52	—	3	42	Hold Your Fire
1988	"Prime Mover" b/w "Tai Shan"			—	43	Hold Your Fire
1989	"Closer to the Heart" (live) b/w "Witch Hunt" (live)	—		—		A Show of Hands
1989	"Show Don't Tell" b/w "Red Tide"	—		1		Presto
1990	"The Pass" b/w "Presto"	—		15		Presto
1992	"Roll the Bones" b/w "Show Don't Tell"	25		9	49	Roll the Bones
1992	"Ghost of a Chance" b/w "Dreamline"		—	2	—	Roll the Bones
1994	"Nobody's Hero" b/w "Stick It Out"		—	9		Counterparts
2010	"Caravan" b/w "BU2B"	44; 50	102; 119	38 —	184 —	Clockwork Angels
2013	"The Garden" b/w "The Garden" (live) (Note: Limited Edition for Record Store Day 2013)		—	—	— (Note: The limited-edition release of a live version of "The Garden" reached number ten on the UK Physical Singles Chart.)	Clockwork Angels
2017	"Closer to the Heart" (Note: Limited edition re-release for 40th Anniversary edition)	—	—	—	— (Note: The 2017 single re-release of "Closer to the Heart" reached number 15 on the Physical Singles Chart and number ten on the Vinyl Singles Chart.)	
"—" denotes singles that did not chart; "blank" denotes singles that were not released in that country.

Sources: Discogs

=== Promotional singles and other charted songs ===
Year	Song	Chart positions	Album
Year	Song	US Main	Album
1981	"A Passage to Bangkok" (live) b/w "Freewill" (live)		Exit...Stage Left
1982	"The Analog Kid" (airplay)	19	Signals
1983	"The Weapon" b/w "Digital Man"		Signals
1985	"Territories" (airplay)	30	Power Windows
1985	"Manhattan Project" (airplay)	10	Power Windows
1986	"Marathon"		Power Windows
1987	"Force Ten"	3	Hold Your Fire
1987	"Lock and Key"	16	Hold Your Fire
1988	"Marathon" (live)	6	A Show of Hands
1989	"Mission" (live)	33	A Show of Hands
1990	"Presto" [airplay]	14	Presto
1990	"Superconductor"	37	Presto
1991	"Dreamline"	1	Roll the Bones
1991	"Where's My Thing?"		Roll the Bones
1992	"Bravado"	13	Roll the Bones
1993	"Stick It Out"	1	Counterparts
1993	"Cold Fire" [airplay]	2	Counterparts
1993	"Double Agent"		Counterparts
1994	"Animate" [airplay]	35	Counterparts
1996	"Test for Echo"	1	Test for Echo
1996	"Half the World"	6	Test for Echo
1997	"Driven"	3	Test for Echo
1997	"Virtuality"		Test for Echo
1998	"The Spirit of Radio" (live) b/w "2112" (live)	27	Different Stages
1998	"Closer to the Heart" (live)		Different Stages
2002	"One Little Victory" b/w "Earthshine"	10	Vapor Trails
2002	"Secret Touch"	25	Vapor Trails
2002	"Sweet Miracle"		Vapor Trails
2003	"Resist" (live)		Rush In Rio
2004	"Summertime Blues"	30	Feedback
2007	"Far Cry"	22	Snakes & Arrows
2007	"Spindrift"		Snakes & Arrows
2007	"Workin' Them Angels"		Snakes & Arrows
2007	"The Larger Bowl (A Pantoum)"		Snakes & Arrows
2012	"Headlong Flight"	23	Clockwork Angels
2012	"The Wreckers"	38	Clockwork Angels
2012	"The Anarchist"		Clockwork Angels
2015	"Roll the Bones" (live)		R40 Live

== Box sets and reissues ==
Title	Album details	Peak chart positions									Certifications (sales thresholds)
Title	Album details	CAN	BEL (Vl.)	FIN	GER	NLD	SWI	UK	USA		Certifications (sales thresholds)
Title	Album details	CAN	BEL (Vl.)	FIN	GER	NLD	SWI	UK	200	Rock	Certifications (sales thresholds)
Archives	Released: March 16, 1978; Label: Anthem; Format: CS, LP, 8-track	—	—	—	—	—	—	—	121	—	RIAA: Platinum
Sector 1	Released: November 21, 2011; Label: Anthem; Format: CD, DVD	—	—	—	—	—	—	—	—	—	
Sector 2	Released: November 21, 2011; Label: Anthem; Format: CD, DVD	—	—	—	—	—	—	—	—	—	
Sector 3	Released: November 21, 2011; Label: Anthem; Format: CD, DVD	—	—	—	—	—	—	—	—	—	
The Studio Albums 1989–2007	Released: September 30, 2013; Label: Anthem; Format: CD	—	—	—	—	—	—	—	—	—	
Rush: ReDISCovered	Released: April 29, 2014; Label: Anthem; Format: LP	—	—	—	—	—	—	—	— (Note: Rush: reDISCovered reached number 127 on the Top Album Sales chart, which excludes streaming factored into the main Billboard 200.)	—	
2112: 40th Anniversary	Released: December 16, 2016; Label: Anthem; Format: CD, DVD, LP	89	—	—	—	—	—	—	—	—	
A Farewell to Kings: 40th Anniversary	Released: December 1, 2017; Label: Anthem; Format: CD, BD, LP	—	—	—	—	150	—	—	— (Note: The 40th Anniversary release of Hemispheres reached number 64 on the Top Album Sales chart, which excludes streaming factored into the main Billboard 200.)	30	
Hemispheres: 40th Anniversary	Released: November 16, 2018; Label: Anthem; Format: CD, BD, LP	—	—	—	—	178	—	—	— (Note: The 40th Anniversary release of Hemispheres reached number 66 on the Top Album Sales chart, which excludes streaming factored into the main Billboard 200.)	— (Note: The 40th Anniversary release of Hemispheres never entered the main Top Rock Albums chart, but reached number 19 on the Top Hard Rock Albums chart.)	
Permanent Waves: 40th Anniversary	Released: May 29, 2020; Label: Anthem; Format: CD, LP	—	—	—	47	91	—	22	— (Note: The 40th Anniversary release of Permanent Waves reached number seven on the Top Album Sales chart, which excludes streaming factored into the main Billboard 200.)	12	
Moving Pictures: 40th Anniversary	Released: April 15, 2022; Label: Anthem; Format: CD, BD, LP	19	67	— (Note: Despite not making the main album chart, the 40th Anniversary reissue of Moving Pictures landed at number seven on the Finnish Physical Albums chart.)	22	46	72	—	— (Note: The 40th Anniversary release of Moving Pictures landed at number two on the Top Album Sales chart, which excludes streaming factored into the main Billboard 200.)	1	
Signals: 40th Anniversary	Released: April 28, 2023; Label: Anthem; Format: CD, BD, LP	—	—	—	88	—	—	—	— (Note: The 40th Anniversary release of Signals landed at number 19 on the Top Album Sales chart, which excludes streaming factored into the main Billboard 200.)	—	
The Albums: 1989-1996	Released: November 1, 2024; Label: Anthem; Format: LP	—	—	—	—	—	—	—	—	—	
Rush 50	Released: March 21, 2025; Label: Anthem; Format: CD, LP	—	—	—	—	—	—	—	—	—	
Grace Under Pressure: Super Deluxe Edition	Released: March 13, 2026; Label: Anthem; Format: CD, BD, LP	—	—	—	—	—	—	—	—	—	
"—" denotes releases that did not chart.

== See also ==
- List of Rush songs
