= Hold Your Fire Tour =

1987–1988 concert tour by Rush

- Tour by Rush
- Poster with the UK tour dates
- Location: Europe; North America
- Associated album: Hold Your Fire
- Start date: October 29, 1987
- End date: May 5, 1988
- Legs: 2
- No. of shows: 78

Rush concert chronology
- Power Windows Tour (1985–1986); Hold Your Fire Tour (1987–1988); Presto Tour (1990)

The Hold Your Fire Tour was a concert tour by Canadian rock band Rush, in support of the band's twelfth studio album Hold Your Fire.

== Background ==
The band continued the trend of their usage of synthesizers, sequencers and onstage automation which continued from their Power Windows Tour, also featuring a laser system with red and green beams as well as a video screen that had animated segments of the three red orbs from the cover of Hold Your Fire. Opening bands on the North American leg included Chalk Circle, the McAuley Schenker Group, and Tommy Shaw. Wishbone Ash was the support act for the band's performances in Europe. The first three European performances at the National Exhibition Centre in Birmingham, England were recorded for the band's live album and video, A Show of Hands.

== Reception ==
Reviewing the Lakeland concert on February 15, 1988, Philip Booth of the Lakeland Ledger who had given the concert a 'poor' review, criticized the band's performance, stating that the band "defined itself by self absorption to the max", referring to their music as "hollow" despite the state-of-the-art equipment they had, as well as calling their music "numbingly loud" and "repetitive". He closed his review, stating that the visuals and music couldn't compensate for Rush's musical substance, concluding that they were "overcooked". Jane E. Stephenson, a reader who had attended the performance, later sent a response to Booth to criticize him, defending the band's performance with a rebuttal that there were "ten thousand screaming fans" who were moved from the concert.

== Set list ==
This is an example set list adapted from Rush: Wandering the Face of the Earth – The Official Touring History of what was performed during the tour, but may not represent the majority of the shows.

1. "The Big Money"
2. "Subdivisions"
3. "Limelight"
4. "Marathon"
5. "Turn the Page"
6. "Prime Mover"
7. "Manhattan Project"
8. "Closer to the Heart"
9. "Red Sector A"
10. "Force Ten"
11. "Time Stand Still"
12. "Distant Early Warning"
13. "Lock and Key"
14. "Mission"
15. "Territories"
16. "YYZ"
17. "The Rhythm Method" (drum solo)
18. "Red Lenses" (abridged)
19. "The Spirit of Radio"
20. "Tom Sawyer"
  Encore
21. "2112 Parts I & II: Overture/The Temples of Syrinx"
22. "La Villa Strangiato"
23. "In the Mood"

== Tour dates ==
List of 1987 concerts
Date	City	Country	Venue	Attendance	Gross
October 29, 1987	St. John's	Canada	Memorial Stadium	8,607 / 11,000	-
October 30, 1987	St. John's	Canada	Memorial Stadium	8,607 / 11,000	-
November 1, 1987	Sydney	Canada	Centre 200	-	-
November 2, 1987	Halifax	Canada	Halifax Metro Centre	-	-
November 4, 1987	Moncton	Canada	Moncton Coliseum	-	-
November 6, 1987	Providence	United States	Providence Civic Center	15,082 / 20,200	-
November 7, 1987	Providence	United States	Providence Civic Center	15,082 / 20,200	-
November 9, 1987	Springfield	United States	Springfield Civic Center	-	-
November 10, 1987	Utica	United States	Utica Memorial Auditorium	3,698 / 6,000	-
November 12, 1987	Troy	United States	RPI Fieldhouse	8,420 / 8,420	-
November 13, 1987	Binghamton	United States	Broome County War Memorial Arena	-	-
November 14, 1987	Buffalo	United States	Buffalo Memorial Auditorium	-	-
~~November 24, 1987~~	Johnson City	United States	Freedom Hall Civic Center	-	-
November 25, 1987	Atlanta	United States	The Omni	10,353 / 13,700	$169,208
November 27, 1987	Charlotte	United States	Charlotte Coliseum	9,186 / 11,009	$143,121
November 30, 1987	Landover	United States	Capital Centre	-	
December 2, 1987	Worcester	United States	The Centrum	17,173 / 20,286	$288,672
December 3, 1987	Worcester	United States	The Centrum	17,173 / 20,286	$288,672
December 5, 1987	New Haven	United States	New Haven Coliseum	-	
December 7, 1987	East Rutherford	United States	Meadowlands Arena	14,483 / 17,963	$272,503
December 9, 1987	Uniondale	United States	Nassau Coliseum	11,754 / 16,375	$198,079
December 11, 1987	New York City	United States	Madison Square Garden	-	
December 13, 1987	Philadelphia	United States	The Spectrum	22,029 / 28,412	$331,413
December 14, 1987	Philadelphia	United States	The Spectrum	22,029 / 28,412	$331,413
December 16, 1987	Pittsburgh	United States	Civic Arena	6,945 / 13,539	-
December 17, 1987	Richfield	United States	Richfield Coliseum	-	-

List of 1988 concerts
Date	City	Country	Venue	Attendance	Gross
January 14, 1988	Hampton	United States	Hampton Coliseum	-	-
January 15, 1988	Raleigh	United States	Reynolds Coliseum	-	-
January 17, 1988	Birmingham	United States	Birmingham-Jefferson Civic Center Coliseum	5,892 / 12,500	-
January 18, 1988	Jackson	United States	Mississippi Coliseum	-	-
January 20, 1988	Dallas	United States	Reunion Arena	-	-
January 21, 1988	San Antonio	United States	Convention Center Arena	-	-
January 23, 1988	Oklahoma City	United States	Myriad Arena	-	-
January 24, 1988	Shreveport	United States	Hirsch Memorial Coliseum	5,289 / 10,000	-
January 26, 1988	Little Rock	United States	Barton Coliseum	-	-
January 27, 1988	New Orleans	United States	UNO Lakefront Arena	-	-
January 29, 1988	Houston	United States	The Summit	12,765 / 17,064	$206,907
January 30, 1988	Austin	United States	Frank Erwin Center	10,567 / 12,494	$160,848
February 1, 1988	Phoenix	United States	Arizona Veterans Memorial Coliseum	12,346 / 12,660	$203,709
February 3, 1988	San Diego	United States	San Diego Sports Arena	11,182 / 11,182	$187,793
February 4, 1988	Inglewood	United States	The Forum	27,586 / 27,586	$483,257
February 5, 1988	Inglewood	United States	The Forum	27,586 / 27,586	$483,257
February 15, 1988	Lakeland	United States	Lakeland Civic Center	10,000 / 10,000	$172,725
February 16, 1988	Pembroke Pines	United States	Hollywood Sportatorium	12,532 / 12,532	$201,333
February 18, 1988	Jacksonville	United States	Veterans Memorial Coliseum	5,809 / 7,400	$90,833
February 19, 1988	Pensacola	United States	Pensacola Civic Center	7,020 / 7,500	$99,405
February 21, 1988	Memphis	United States	Mid-South Coliseum	5,691 / 12,065	$91,056
February 22, 1988	Nashville	United States	Nashville Municipal Auditorium	-	
February 23, 1988	Cincinnati	United States	Riverfront Coliseum	-	
February 25, 1988	Rosemont	United States	Rosemont Horizon	22,984 / 25,962	$391,772
February 26, 1988	Rosemont	United States	Rosemont Horizon	22,984 / 25,962	$391,772
February 28, 1988	Peoria	United States	Peoria Civic Center	-	
March 1, 1988	St. Louis	United States	St. Louis Arena	10,971 / 11,500	$175,032
March 2, 1988	Indianapolis	United States	Market Square Arena	7,456 / 13,500	$115,568
March 4, 1988	Detroit	United States	Joe Louis Arena	31,808 / 31,808	-
March 5, 1988	Detroit	United States	Joe Louis Arena	31,808 / 31,808	-
March 7, 1988	Toronto	Canada	Maple Leaf Gardens	20,490 / 32,000	$458,181
March 8, 1988	Toronto	Canada	Maple Leaf Gardens	20,490 / 32,000	$458,181
March 10, 1988	Montreal	Canada	Montreal Forum	11,379 / 12,500	$221,891
March 11, 1988	Quebec City	Canada	Colisee de Quebec	9,580 / 11,800	$186,810
March 12, 1988	Ottawa	Canada	Ottawa Civic Centre	-	-
April 2, 1988	Omaha	United States	Omaha Civic Auditorium	7,609 / 12,000	-
April 4, 1988	Bloomington	United States	Met Center	8,664 / 10,500	$151,620
April 5, 1988	Milwaukee	United States	MECCA Arena	9,605 / 9,605	$164,133
April 7, 1988	Kansas City	United States	Kemper Arena	9,524 / 11,200	$152,609
April 9, 1988	Louisville	United States	Louisville Gardens	3,965 / 5,000	$62,668
April 10, 1988	Dayton	United States	Hara Arena	5,430 / 7,500	$85,069
April 21, 1988	Birmingham	England	National Exhibition Centre Arena	-	
April 23, 1988	Birmingham	England	National Exhibition Centre Arena	-	
April 24, 1988	Birmingham	England	National Exhibition Centre Arena	-	
April 26, 1988	Glasgow	Scotland	Scottish Exhibition and Conference Centre	-	
April 28, 1988	London	England	Wembley Arena	-	
April 29, 1988	London	England	Wembley Arena	-	
April 30, 1988	London	England	Wembley Arena	-	
May 2, 1988	Rotterdam	Netherlands	Ahoy Sportpaleis	11,540 / 11,540	
May 4, 1988	Frankfurt	West Germany	Festhalle	-	
May 5, 1988	Stuttgart	West Germany	Schleyer-Halle	-	

=== Box office score data ===
List of box office score data with date, city, venue, attendance, gross, references
Date	City	Venue	Attendance	Gross	Ref(s)
December 7, 1987	East Rutherford, United States	Meadowlands Arena	14,483 / 17,963	$272,503	

== Personnel ==
- Geddy Lee – vocals, bass, keyboards
- Alex Lifeson – guitar, backing vocals
- Neil Peart – drums
