= Chronicles (Rush album) =

Compilation album by Rush
- Released: September 4, 1990
- Recorded: 1973–1989
- Genres: Progressive rock, hard rock, heavy metal
- Length: 2:23:42
- Labels: Anthem (Canada); Mercury
- Producers: Rush, Terry Brown, Peter Henderson, Peter Collins, Rupert Hine

Rush chronology
Presto (1989)	Chronicles (1990)	Roll the Bones (1991)

Professional ratings
Review scores
Source	Rating
Allmusic	4.5/5 stars
The Encyclopedia of Popular Music	4/5 stars
Entertainment Weekly	C−
The Essential Rock Discography	7/10
The Rolling Stone Album Guide	3/5 stars
The Virgin Encyclopedia of 80s Music	4/5 stars

Chronicles is a double compilation album by Canadian rock band Rush, released in 1990. The collection was the band's first album to be released in the 1990s, though it was assembled without the participation of the band. A companion edition of Rush music videos from 1981 to 1987, titled Chronicles: The Video Collection, was also released on VHS and laserdisc on October 23, 1990. The video edition was re-released on a single DVD in 2001, titled Rush Chronicles – The DVD Collection, with two additional video tracks that are hidden Easter eggs.

== Track listing ==
Disc one
No.	Title	Original album	Length
1.	"Finding My Way"	Rush (1974)	5:07
2.	"Working Man"	Rush	7:11
3.	"Fly by Night"	Fly by Night (1975)	3:21
4.	"Anthem"	Fly by Night	4:24
5.	"Bastille Day"	Caress of Steel (1975)	4:39
6.	"Lakeside Park"	Caress of Steel	4:10
7.	"2112": "Overture" (4:31)/"The Temples of Syrinx" (2:16)	2112 (1976)	6:47
8.	"What You're Doing" (live)	All the World's a Stage (1976)	5:41
9.	"A Farewell to Kings"	A Farewell to Kings (1977)	5:52
10.	"Closer to the Heart"	A Farewell to Kings	2:54
11.	"The Trees"	Hemispheres (1978)	4:40
12.	"La Villa Strangiato”"	Hemispheres	9:36
13.	"Freewill"	Permanent Waves (1980)	5:25
14.	"The Spirit of Radio"	Permanent Waves	4:57
Total length:			74:46

Disc two
No.	Title	Original album	Length
1.	"Tom Sawyer"	Moving Pictures (1981)	4:37
2.	"Red Barchetta"	Moving Pictures	6:09
3.	"Limelight"	Moving Pictures	4:22
4.	"A Passage to Bangkok" (live)	Exit... Stage Left (1981)	3:47
5.	"Subdivisions"	Signals (1982)	5:34
6.	"New World Man"	Signals	3:42
7.	"Distant Early Warning"	Grace Under Pressure (1984)	4:58
8.	"Red Sector A"	Grace Under Pressure	5:12
9.	"The Big Money"	Power Windows (1985)	5:35
10.	"Manhattan Project"	Power Windows	5:06
11.	"Force Ten"	Hold Your Fire (1987)	4:33
12.	"Time Stand Still"	Hold Your Fire	5:10
13.	"Mystic Rhythms" (live)	A Show of Hands (1989)	5:42
14.	"Show Don't Tell"	Presto (1989)	5:00
Total length:			68:56

== Personnel ==
- Geddy Lee – bass, synthesizer, vocals
- Alex Lifeson – acoustic and electric guitars
- Neil Peart – drums, percussion (all tracks except "Finding My Way" and "Working Man")
- John Rutsey – drums ("Finding My Way" and "Working Man" only)
- Aimee Mann - backing vocals on "Time Stand Still"

== Charts ==
Chart (1990)	Peak position
Canada Top Albums/CDs (RPM)	38
UK Albums (Official Charts)	42
US Billboard 200	51

== Video Track listing ==
1. Closer to the Heart
2. The Trees (Note: Live version on soundstage)
3. Limelight
4. Tom Sawyer
5. Red Barchetta (Note: Live version from Exit...Stage Left)
6. Subdivisions
7. Distant Early Warning
8. Red Sector A (Note: Live version from Grace Under Pressure Tour)
9. The Big Money
10. Mystic Rhythms
11. Time Stand Still
12. Lock and Key
13. The Enemy Within (Note: DVD Bonus Track)
14. Afterimage (Note: DVD Bonus Track)

== Certifications ==
Album

Region	Certification	Certified units/sales
Canada (Music Canada)	2× Platinum	200,000^{^}
United States (RIAA)	2× Platinum	2,000,000^{^}
^{^} Shipments figures based on certification alone.

DVD

Region	Certification	Certified units/sales
Canada (Music Canada)	Gold	5,000^{^}
United States (RIAA)	Platinum	100,000^{^}
^{^} Shipments figures based on certification alone.
