= Rush Replay X 3 =

Box set by Rush
- Released: June 13, 2006
- Recorded: 1981,1984, 1988
- Genre: Progressive rock
- Labels: Anthem Records (Canada); Mercury Records
- Producers: Rush, Terry Brown, Jon Erickson, Geddy Lee, Alex Lifeson

Rush chronology
R30: 30th Anniversary World Tour (2005)	Rush Replay X 3 (2006)	Snakes & Arrows Live (2008)

Rush Replay X 3 is a DVD box set of three separate filmed concert presentations by the Canadian band Rush, released on June 13, 2006. The three shows presented are Exit... Stage Left, Grace Under Pressure Tour, and A Show of Hands, which were originally released individually in 1982, 1985, and 1988 respectively on VHS and Laserdisc. For Replay X 3, each filmed concert has been remixed in 5.1 surround sound by Rush guitarist and co-producer Alex Lifeson. The box set also includes a previously unreleased CD audio version of the Grace Under Pressure Tour video, and a set of reprinted tour books for each concert.

== Track listing ==
=== Disc one: Exit... Stage Left ===
1. Intro ("The Camera Eye") - 2:15
2. "Limelight" - 4:38
3. "Tom Sawyer" - 5:00
4. "The Trees" - 4:47
5. "Xanadu" - 12:32
6. "Red Barchetta" - 6:37
7. "Freewill" - 5:50
8. "Closer to the Heart" - 3:30
9. "YYZ" - 1:25
10. "By-Tor and the Snow Dog" - 4:13
11. "In the End" - 1:42
12. "In the Mood" - 1:35
13. "2112: Finale" - 2:42

=== Disc two: Grace Under Pressure Tour ===
1. Intro
2. "The Spirit of Radio"
3. "The Enemy Within"
4. "The Weapon"
5. "Witch Hunt"
6. "New World Man"
7. "Distant Early Warning"
8. "Red Sector A"
9. "Closer to the Heart"
10. "YYZ"
11. "2112: Temples Of Syrinx"
12. "Tom Sawyer"
13. "Vital Signs"
14. "Finding My Way"
15. "In the Mood"

Rush Replay X 3 also includes an audio CD of the above show.

Box sets purchased from Best Buy contain the following exclusive audio CD tracks: "Limelight" and "Closer to the Heart" from Exit...Stage Left and "The Spirit of Radio" and "Tom Sawyer" from the A Show of Hands video soundtracks. However, the track listing on the Best Buy version of X 3 does not list any of the additional four tracks.

=== Disc three: A Show of Hands ===
1. Intro
2. "The Big Money"
3. "Marathon"
4. "Turn the Page"
5. "Prime Mover"
6. "Manhattan Project"
7. "Closer to the Heart"
8. "Red Sector A"
9. "Force Ten"
10. "Mission"
11. "Territories"
12. "YYZ" †
13. "The Rhythm Method" (drum solo)
14. "The Spirit of Radio"
15. "Tom Sawyer"
16. "2112 Overture"
17. "The Temples of Syrinx"
18. "La Villa Strangiato"
19. "In the Mood"

† The DVD does not list "YYZ" in the track listing and groups it together with the song "Territories".

Note: The DVD version of A Show of Hands contains the full program of the VHS version; "Lock and Key" appeared on the laserdisc version after "Force Ten" on A Show of Hands, but does not appear on the DVD or VHS.

== Certifications ==
Region	Certification	Certified units/sales
Canada (Music Canada)	5× Platinum	50,000^{^}
^{^} Shipments figures based on certification alone.
