= A Show of Hands (video) =

Video by Rush
- Released: February 21, 1989 (VHS, Laserdisc); May 1, 2007 (DVD)
- Recorded: April 21–24, 1988
- Venues: The National Exhibition Centre, Birmingham, England (VHS, LD and DVD)
- Genres: Progressive rock, hard rock
- Length: 90 min. (VHS and DVD) 95 min (LaserDisc)
- Label: Anthem / PolyGram
- Director: Larry Jordan
- Producers: Len Epand, John Diaz

Rush chronology
Grace Under Pressure Tour (1985)	A Show of Hands (1989)	Rush in Rio (2003)

Professional ratings
Review scores
Source	Rating
Allmusic	4/5 stars

A Show of Hands is a concert film released on VHS, Laserdisc and DVD by the Canadian rock band Rush. It documents a live concert performance by the band on their 1987-88 Hold Your Fire Tour. In 1989, the band released an audio album of the same name on vinyl LP, audiocassette, and compact disc. The video comprises an entirely different recording, and features a different track list.

== Dates of release & formats ==
The VHS and Laserdisc versions were the original formats of release, both in 1989. They are both currently out-of-print.

In 2006, a DVD version of the original production, with its audio re-mastered in 5.1-channel Dolby Surround by Rush guitarist and co-producer Alex Lifeson, was released as part of the DVD box set, titled Rush Replay X 3. In 2007, the DVD version of A Show of Hands, as it was included in Replay X 3, was released as a single, stand-alone DVD.

== Track listing ==
1. Intro
2. "The Big Money"
3. "Marathon"
4. "Turn the Page"
5. "Prime Mover"
6. "Manhattan Project"
7. "Closer to the Heart"
8. "Red Sector A"
9. "Force Ten"
10. "Lock and Key" (laserdisc only)
11. "Mission"
12. "Territories"/"YYZ"
13. "The Rhythm Method" (drum solo)
14. "The Spirit of Radio"
15. "Tom Sawyer"
16. "2112 Overture"/"The Temples of Syrinx"/"La Villa Strangiato"/"In the Mood"
17. (Credits)

"YYZ" is not listed on the DVD track list.

The DVD version of A Show of Hands contains the full program of the VHS version; "Lock and Key" appeared on the laserdisc version of A Show of Hands, but does not appear on the DVD or VHS versions. It was later included on a bonus disc in the R40 Box Set.

== Personnel ==
- Geddy Lee – bass guitar, synthesizers, vocals
- Alex Lifeson – guitars, synthesizers, backing vocals
- Neil Peart – acoustic and electronic percussion

== Certifications ==
Region	Certification	Certified units/sales
Canada (Music Canada)	Platinum	10,000^{^}
United States (RIAA)	Platinum	100,000^{^}
^{^} Shipments figures based on certification alone.
