= Hugh Syme =

Canadian graphic designer

- Born: Hugh Syme; 1953 (age 72–73); Canada
- Known for: Graphic artist, keyboardist
- Notable work: Rush art direction; Iron Maiden - The X Factor; Dream Theater - Octavarium; Megadeth - Countdown to Extinction
- Website: www.hughsyme.com

Hugh Syme is a Canadian graphic artist and member of the Premier Artists Collection (PAC), best known for his artwork and cover concepts for rock and metal bands. His work has won five Juno awards. He is also a musician and has contributed as a keyboard player on several Rush albums.

== Career ==
Syme has been responsible for all of Rush's album cover art since 1975's Caress of Steel and is the creator of Rush's famous Starman logo. In 1983, he told Jeffrey Morgan that he never imagined the band would use it as their main logo. Other bands for which Syme has created artwork include Megadeth, Saga, Styx, Altered State, Fates Warning, Whitesnake, Queensrÿche, Aerosmith, and Dream Theater.

== Album cover art ==
Chronological list of Hugh Syme's album cover art (including studio, live, compilation and extended play LPs).

Year	Artist	Album	Role
1975	Rush	Caress of Steel	Graphics
1975	Ian Thomas Band	Delights	Graphics with John Fraser
1976	Ian Thomas Band	Calabash	Graphics
1976	Rush	2112	Graphics and Starman Logo
1976	Rush	All the World's a Stage	Graphics
1977	Rush	A Farewell to Kings	Art direction and graphics
1977	Max Webster	High Class in Borrowed Shoes	Art direction and graphics
1978	Rush	Hemispheres	Art direction with Bob King and graphics
1978	Rush	Archives	Design with Bob King and graphics
1978	Klaatu	Sir Army Suit	Cover art
1978	Max Webster	Mutiny Up My Sleeve	Art direction and design
1979	Ian Thomas Band	Glider	Graphics and design with Bob King
1979	Max Webster	Live Magnetic Air	Art direction and graphics
1980	Rush	Permanent Waves	Art direction and graphics. Cover concept created with Neil Peart.
1980	Toronto	Lookin' for Trouble	Graphics and design with Michael Gray.
1981	Rush	Moving Pictures	Art direction and graphics. Cover concept created with Deborah Samuel.
1981	Rush	Exit...Stage Left	Art direction, graphics and cover concept
1982	Rush	Signals	Art direction, graphics and cover concept
1982	Saga	In Transit	Art direction and design
1982	Gowan	Gowan	Art direction, graphics and cover concept
1982	Harlequin	One False Move	Cover design
1983	Red Rider	Neruda	Art direction and cover design
1984	Rush	Grace Under Pressure	Art direction and cover painting
1984	Ian Thomas Band	Riders on Dark Horses	Art direction and design
1984	The Parachute Club	At the Feet of the Moon	Art direction and graphics with Deborah Samuel
1985	Lee Aaron	Call of the Wild	Cover design
1985	Rush	Power Windows	Art direction, graphics and cover painting
1985	Virgin Steele	Noble Savage	Art direction and design
1985	Kick Axe	Welcome to the Club	Art direction and cover art
1985	Robotman and Friends	Straight from the Heart	Cover painting
1986	Eyes	Eyes	Art direction and design
1986	Honeymoon Suite	The Big Prize	Cover design with Dimo Safari
1986	Quiet Riot	QR III	Art direction, design, cover art
1986	Kim Mitchell	Shakin' Like a Human Being	Art direction and design
1986	Outlaws	Soldiers of Fortune	Art direction, design, cover painting
1987	Whitesnake	Whitesnake	Cover art and Whitesnake emblem
1987	Billy Thorpe	Children of the Sun... Revisited	Art direction and design
1987	Y & T	Contagious	Art direction
1987	McAuley Schenker Group	Perfect Timing	Art direction and design
1987	Rush	Hold Your Fire	Art direction
1988	Colortone	Colortone	Art direction and design
1988	Rhythm Corps	Common Ground	Art direction and design
1988	Kingdom Come	Kingdom Come	Art direction and design
1988	Lillian Axe	Lillian Axe	Art direction and design
1988	Night Ranger	Man in Motion	Art direction
1988	Brighton Rock	Take a Deep Breath	Art direction and design
1988	Dream Patrol	Phoning the Czar	Art direction and design
1988	Quiet Riot	QR	Art direction and design
1988	Survivor	Too Hot to Sleep	Art direction and design
1988	Black 'n Blue	In Heat	Art direction and design
1988	Bon Jovi	New Jersey	Art direction with Jon Bon Jovi and design
1988	Ian Thomas Band	Levity	Art direction and design
1988	Prophet	Cycle of the Moon	Art direction and design
1989	Rush	Presto	Art direction
1989	Rush	A Show of Hands	Art direction and design
1989	Kingdom Come	In Your Face	Design
1989	Bad English	Bad English	Art direction and design
1989	Fates Warning	Perfect Symmetry	Cover concept, art direction and design
1989	Whitesnake	Slip of the Tongue	Cover art
1989	Kim Mitchell	Rockland	Art direction and design
1989	World Trade	World Trade	Cover art and design
1989	Bonfire	Point Blank	Art direction and design
1989	Babylon A.D.	Babylon A.D.	Art direction and design
1990	Magnum	Goodnight L.A.	Cover art
1990	Rush	Chronicles	Art direction
1990	Slaughter	Stick It to Ya	Cover design with Glen Wexler
1990	Styx	Edge of the Century	Art direction and design
1990	Warrant	Cherry Pie	Art direction and design
1990	Hurricane	Slave to the Thrill	Art direction and design
1990	Celine Dion	Unison	Art direction and design
1990	The Northern Pikes	Snow in June	Art direction and design
1990	Mae Moore	Oceanview Motel	Art direction and design
1991	Dan Hill	Dance of Love	Art direction and design
1991	Steve Plunkett	My Attitude	Art direction and design
1991	Rush	Roll the Bones	Art direction and design
1991	Great White	Hooked	Art direction and design
1991	The Boomers YYZ	What We Do	Art direction and design
1991	Kik Tracee	No Rules	Art direction and design
1991	Fates Warning	Parallels	Art direction and design
1991	Kix	Hot Wire	Art direction and design
1991	Bad English	Backlash	Art direction and design
1991	Contraband	Contraband	Art direction with Frenchy Gauthier and design
1991	The Storm	The Storm	Art direction and design
1992	McAuley Schenker Group	M.S.G.	Art direction and design
1992	House of Lords	Demons Down	Design with Glen Wexler
1992	54•40	Dear Dear	Art direction and design
1992	Kiss	Revenge	Art direction
1992	Skew Siskin	Skew Siskin	Art direction and design
1992	The Jeff Healey Band	Feel This	Art direction and design with Tom Stephen
1992	Me Phi Me	One	Art direction
1992	Steelheart	Tangled in Reins	Art direction and design
1992	21 Guns	Salute	Art direction and design
1992	Megadeth	Countdown to Extinction	Art direction and design
1992	Unruly Child	Unruly Child	Art direction and design
1992	Sister Whiskey	Sister Whiskey (Liquor & Poker)	Cover art
1992	Impellitteri	Grin and Bear It	Prop design
1993	Aerosmith	Get a Grip	Cover design
1993	Altered State	Dos	Art direction, design
1993	Def Leppard	Retro Active	Art direction, design and digital illustration with Nels Israelson
1993	Coverdale/Page	Coverdale/Page	Art direction and design
1993	Helix	It's a Business Doing Pleasure	Cover art and design
1993	Damn the Machine	Damn the Machine	Art direction and design
1993	Every Mother's Nightmare	Wake Up Screaming	Art direction and design
1993	Rush	Counterparts	Art direction, illustrations and design
1993	BulletBoys	Za-Za	Lettering, letter design
1993	The Boomers	The Art of Living	Art direction, illustrations and design
1993	The Band	Jericho	Cover art, art direction and design
1994	Stray Cats	Choo Choo Hot Fish	Art direction and design
1994	Roger Clinton	Nothing Good Comes Easy	Artwork and design
1994	Dave Edmunds	Plugged In	Art direction and design
1994	Whitesnake	Greatest Hits	Art direction and design
1994	Megadeth	Youthanasia	Design and digital illustration. Art direction with Tommy Steele.
1994	Queensrÿche	Promised Land	Art direction, design and digital illustration
1994	Tesla	Bust a Nut	Artwork, art direction, design
1994	Fates Warning	Inside Out	Artwork and design
1994	Various artists	Burning for Buddy: A Tribute to the Music of Buddy Rich	Art direction and design
1995	Iron Maiden	The X Factor	Art direction, design, illustrations, digital illustrations
1996	Celine Dion	Live à Paris	Art direction, graphic concept
1996	Rush	Test for Echo	Art direction, design and digital illustration
1996	The Band	High on the Hog	Art direction and design
1996	The Boomers	25 Thousand Days	Art direction, illustrations and design
1996	Earth, Wind & Fire	Greatest Hits Live	Art direction and design
1996	Pod/Soma	Headed for the Zeros	Art direction, illustrations and design
1997	Alice Cooper	A Fistful of Alice	Cover design
1997	Queensrÿche	Hear in the Now Frontier	Art direction, artwork and design with Dimo Safari
1997	Supertramp	Some Things Never Change	Art direction and design
1997	Megadeth	Cryptic Writings	Art Direction, design and illustrations
1997	Rush	Retrospective I	Art direction and design
1997	Rush	Retrospective II	Art direction, design and cover painting
1997	Whitesnake	Restless Heart	Art direction, emblem design and cover concept with Dimo Safari and David Coverdale
1997	Earth, Wind and Fire	In the Name of Love	Art direction, design and digital illustration
1997	Various artists	Burning for Buddy: A Tribute to the Music of Buddy Rich, Vol. 2	Art direction and design
1998	Arena	The Visitor	Art direction and design
1998	Rush	Different Stages	Art direction, illustration and design
1998	Uriah Heep	Classic Heep: An Anthology	Art direction and design
1999	The Kings	The Kings Are Here..and More	Design
1999	Tiles	Presents of Mind	Cover concept, artwork and design
1999	Henry Lee Summer	Smoke and Mirrors	Art direction and design
1999	Charlotte Church	Charlotte Church	Art direction, design and photography
2000	Arena	Immortal?	Art direction and design
2000	Queensrÿche	Greatest Hits	Art direction and design
2000	Carrie Newcomer	Age of Possibility	Art direction and design
2001	Jennie Devoe	Does She Walk on Water	Art direction and design
2001	Megadeth	The World Needs a Hero	Art direction, design and illustrations
2001	Deep Blue Something	Deep Blue Something	Art direction and design
2001	The Bacon Brothers	Can't Complain	Art direction, design and illustrations
2001	Deana Carter	Father Christmas	Design
2002	Rush	Vapor Trails	Art direction, paintings and portraits
2002	Heather Myles	Sweet Talk and Good Lies	Art direction and design
2002	Styx	At the River's Edge: Live in St. Louis	Logo design
2002	Carrie Newcomer	The Gathering of Spirits	Art direction and design
2002	The Boomers	Midway	Art direction, illustrations and design
2003	The Allman Brothers Band	Hittin' the Note	Art direction, illustrations
2003	Extol	Synergy	Cover art
2003	Rush	Rush in Rio	Art direction, illustrations and design
2003	Rush	The Spirit of Radio: Greatest Hits 1974–1987	Art direction and design
2003	The Wayfaring Strangers	This Train	Art direction
2003	Quill•Tolhurst	So Rudely Interrupted	Cover art and graphics
2004	Travis Larson	Burn Season	Art direction
2004	Billy Jonas	Get Real	Art direction, illustrations and design
2004	Carrie Newcomer	Betty's Diner: The Best of Carrie Newcomer	Art direction and design
2004	Tiles	Window Dressing	Artwork, photography and design
2004	Rush	Feedback (EP)	Art direction, illustrations and design
2005	Various artists	Subdivisions: A Tribute to Rush	Art direction and design
2005	Dream Theater	Octavarium	Art direction, illustrations and design
2005	Nevermore	This Godless Endeavor	Cover art
2005	Bad Moon Rising	Full Moon Collection	Design
2005	Carrie Newcomer	Regulars and Refugees	Art direction and design
2005	Rush	R30: 30th Anniversary World Tour	Art direction, illustrations and design
2006	Oneside	Oneside	Art direction, illustrations and design
2006	Rush	Gold	Art direction and design
2006	Rush	Rush Replay X 3	Art direction and design
2006	Stone Sour	Come What(ever) May	Art direction, illustrations and design
2007	Dream Theater	Systematic Chaos	Art direction, illustrations and design
2007	Rush	Snakes & Arrows	Art direction, illustrations and design
2007	Queensrÿche	Sign of the Times: The Best of Queensrÿche	Art direction, illustrations and design
2007	Byron Nemeth Group	The Force Within	Art direction, illustrations and design
2007	Krista Detor	Cover Their Eyes	Art direction and design
2007	Charlotte Church	The Charlotte Church Show	Art direction, photography and design
2008	Oneside	First, to Last	Art direction and design
2008	Tiles	Fly Paper	Artwork, design, photography, and illustrations
2008	Dream Theater	Greatest Hit (...And 21 Other Pretty Cool Songs)	Art direction, design, photography, and illustrations
2008	Dream Theater	Chaos in Motion 2007–2008	Artwork and design
2008	Cynic (UK)	Suburban Crisis	Art Direction, Photography, and Design
2008	Rush	Snakes & Arrows Live	Art direction, illustrations and design
2008	Bob Mover	It Amazes Me	Art direction, photography and design
2009	Queensrÿche	American Soldier	Art direction, illustrations and design
2009	Rush	Retrospective 3	Art direction and design
2009	Rush	Grace Under Pressure Tour	Art direction and design
2009	Dream Theater	Black Clouds & Silver Linings	Art direction, illustrations and design
2009	Flying Machines	Flying Machines	Art direction, illustrations and design
2010	Carrie Newcomer	Before & After	Art direction and design
2010	Krista Detor	Chocolate Paper Suites	Art direction, illustrations and design
2010	Rush	Icon	Cover art
2011	Rush	Icon 2	Cover art
2011	3 Doors Down	Time of My Life	Cover concept, art direction, illustrations and design
2011	Dream Theater	A Dramatic Turn of Events	Art direction and design
2011	Rush	Time Machine 2011: Live in Cleveland	Art direction and design
2012	Betrayer	Betrayer	Art direction, artwork and design
2012	Rush	Clockwork Angels	Cover art
2012	Rush	2112 5.1	Art direction and design
2012	Tiles	Off the Floor 01	Cover art
2013	Dream Theater	Dream Theater	Cover and album design
2014	Carrie Newcomer	A Permeable Life	
2014	Tiles	Off the Floor 02	Cover art
2014	Flying Colors	Second Nature	art direction, design, illustrations
2014	Dream Theater	Breaking the Fourth Wall	Cover art
2017	Rush	A Farewell To Kings-40th Anniversary Deluxe Edition	Art Direction and design
2018	Rush	Hemispheres-40th Anniversary Deluxe Edition	Art Direction and design
2018	Alien Country	Like My Life Depends on It	Art Director, artwork and design
2019	Dream Theater	Distance Over Time	Cover art
2020	Rush	Permanent Waves-40th Anniversary Deluxe Edition	Art Direction and design
2020	Gustavo Carmo (feat. Brian Tichy, Rudy Sarzo & Derek Sherinian)	On and Off	Cover art
2020	Wandering X	Carved in Stone	Cover art
2020	Dream Theater	Distant Memories - Live in London	Cover art
2021	Rivers & Rust	"What a Waste"	Cover art
2021	Wandering X	Life Expectancy	Cover art
2021	Joe Bonamassa	Time Clocks	Cover art
2021	Carrie Newcomer	Until Now	Cover art
2021	Fairy Tale	That Is The Question	Cover art
2021	Dream Theater	A View from the Top of the World	Cover art
2021	Benjamin Croft	Far & Distant Things	Cover art
2022	Talas	1985	Cover art
2022	Rush	Moving Pictures (40th Anniversary)	Art Direction and design
2022	TRIBUTES	Songs for Neil Vol. 3	Cover art
2022	Brother Dynamite	If We Dare	Cover art
2022	Dane Clark	Memory Mile	Cover art
2022	A-Z	A-Z	Cover art
2022	SOMA	Headed for the Zeros	Cover art
2022	Hilario Durán and David Virelles	Front Street Duets	Cover art
2023	Arch Echo	Final Pitch	Artwork, Illustration, Design
2023	Rush	Signals (40th Anniversary)	Artwork, Illustration, Design
2024	Orion	The Lightbringers	Art direction, Design
2024	Robert Jon & the Wreck	Red Moon Rising	Art direction, Design
2024	Black Country Communion	V	Art direction, Illustration, Design
2025	Dane Clark	Guru's, Hitmen & Heaven	Art direction, Illustration, Design
2025	Dream Theater	Parasomnia	Cover art, album design
2025	A-Z	A-Z²	Cover art

== Discography ==
Syme has contributed as a musician with Ian Thomas Band, Rush and Tiles.

with Ian Thomas Band

- Delights - piano, Fender Rhodes, Mellotron and background vocals
- Calabash - keyboards, background vocals and creative companionship and album cover artwork
- Still Here - keyboards and background vocals (co-arrangement on "I Really Love You" and "Tinkerbell")
- Glider - keyboards and all songs arranged with Ian Thomas
- The Runner - keyboards and background vocals

with Rush

- 2112 - ARP synthesizer intro to "2112: Overture" and Mellotron and ARP Odyssey on "Tears"
- Permanent Waves - piano on "Different Strings"
- Moving Pictures - synthesizers on "Witch Hunt"

with Tiles

- Window Dressing - keyboards on "Slippers in the Snow"
- Fly Paper - keyboards on "Crowded Emptiness" and solo piano on "Passing Notes"

with Alice in Chains

- 2112 - 40th Anniversary Deluxe Reissue - Mellotron, string arrangement, woodwinds, and boy's choir on Geddy Lee's re-released song "Tears"

with Jim McCarty

- Walking in the Wild Land - Piano, nylon and steel string acoustic guitar, synths, string arrangements, boy's choir, Mellotron on "Changing Times", "Dancing Leaves" and "So Many Questions". James Stanley McCarty (born 25 July 1943) is an English musician, best known as the drummer for the Yardbirds and Renaissance.

== Awards ==
Juno Awards: 5 wins and 18 nominations.

- 1999: Best Album Design nomination - Different Stages by Rush, with Geddy Lee and Andrew MacNaughtan
- 1993: Best Album Design nomination - Dear Dear by 54-40
- 1992: Best Album Design nomination - Big House by Big House
- 1992: Best Album Design win - Roll the Bones by Rush
- 1991: Best Album Design nomination - Oceanview Motel by Mae Moore
- 1991: Best Album Design nomination - Snow in June by The Northern Pikes
- 1990: Best Album Design win - Presto by Rush
- 1990: Best Album Design nomination - Rockland by Kim Mitchell
- 1989: Best Album Graphics win - Levity by Ian Thomas
- 1986: Best Album Graphics nomination - Robot Man and Friends by Peter Shelly, with Heather Brown and Peter Shelly
- 1986: Best Album Graphics win - Power Windows by Rush, with Dimo Safari
- 1985: Best Album Graphics nomination - At the Feet of the Moon by Parachute Club, with Deborah Samuel
- 1983: Best Album Graphics nomination - Signals by Rush
- 1983: Best Album Graphics nomination - One False Move by Harlequin
- 1982: Best Album Graphics nomination - Exit...Stage Left by Rush, with Deborah Samuel
- 1982: Best Album Graphics win - Moving Pictures by Rush, with Deborah Samuel
- 1981: Best Album Graphics nomination - Lookin' for Trouble by Toronto, with Michael Gray
- 1978: Best Album Graphics nomination - A Farewell to Kings by Rush
