= The Spirit of Radio: Greatest Hits 1974–1987 =

Greatest hits album by Rush
- Released: February 11, 2003
- Recorded: 1973–1987
- Genres: Hard rock; progressive rock; heavy metal
- Length: 79:47
- Label: Anthem
- Producers: Rush; Terry Brown; Peter Henderson; Peter Collins

Rush chronology
Vapor Trails (2002)	The Spirit of Radio: Greatest Hits 1974–1987 (2003)	Rush in Rio (2003)

The Spirit of Radio: Greatest Hits 1974–1987 is a compilation album by Canadian rock band Rush, released on February 11, 2003. It includes many of the band's most popular songs from their Mercury Records era, but does not feature any material from their third album Caress of Steel. A special edition of the album included a DVD containing music videos for several songs, including "Mystic Rhythms" (which does not appear on the album itself).

It was released on a 2LP vinyl package on October 2, 2026 which was its first appearance on vinyl.

== Reception ==
Professional ratings
Review scores
Source	Rating
Allmusic	4.5/5 stars
The Encyclopedia of Popular Music	4/5 stars
The Essential Rock Discography	8/10
Q	4/5 stars
The Rolling Stone Album Guide	3/5 stars
Uncut	4/5 stars

"This 16-track Best Of skips over the early years…" noted Paul Elliott in Q. "The '80s brought shorter songs, better tunes and even a Top 20 UK hit with 'The Spirit of Radio', one of the great rock singles and perhaps the only song ever to feature a Simon & Garfunkel reference, a reggae breakdown and the word 'unobtrusive'." Following Neil Peart's death in January 2020, the album re-entered the Billboard 200 at number 45.

== Track listing ==
All tracks are written by Geddy Lee, Alex Lifeson and Neil Peart, except where noted.

No.	Title	Writer(s)	Original release	Length
1.	"Working Man"	Lee, Lifeson	Rush (1974)	7:11
2.	"Fly by Night"		Fly by Night (1975)	3:22
3.	"2112 Overture" (4:31) / "The Temples of Syrinx" (2:14)		2112 (1976)	6:45
4.	"Closer to the Heart"	Lee, Lifeson, Peart, Peter Talbot	A Farewell to Kings (1977)	2:53
5.	"The Trees"		Hemispheres (1978)	4:42
6.	"The Spirit of Radio"		Permanent Waves (1980)	4:57
7.	"Freewill"		Permanent Waves	5:23
8.	"Limelight"		Moving Pictures (1981)	4:20
9.	"Tom Sawyer"	Lee, Lifeson, Peart, Pye Dubois	Moving Pictures	4:33
10.	"Red Barchetta"		Moving Pictures	6:10
11.	"New World Man"		Signals (1982)	3:43
12.	"Subdivisions"		Signals	5:34
13.	"Distant Early Warning"		Grace Under Pressure (1984)	4:58
14.	"The Big Money"		Power Windows (1985)	5:35
15.	"Force Ten"	Lee, Lifeson, Peart, Dubois	Hold Your Fire (1987)	4:32
16.	"Time Stand Still" (featuring Aimee Mann)		Hold Your Fire	5:09
Total length:				79:57

== DVD titles ==
No.	Title	Length
1.	"Closer to the Heart"	2:52
2.	"Tom Sawyer"	4:34
3.	"Subdivisions"	5:33
4.	"The Big Money"	4:57
5.	"Mystic Rhythms"	5:20

== Personnel ==
Rush

- Geddy Lee – bass guitar, synthesizers, vocals
- Alex Lifeson – electric and acoustic guitars, synthesizers, vocals
- Neil Peart – drums, percussion, lyricist

* John Rutsey – drums and percussion on "Working Man"

Additional personnel

- Terry Brown – production (tracks 1–12)
- Peter Collins – production (tracks 14–16)
- Peter Henderson – production (track 13)
- Aimee Mann – additional vocals on "Time Stand Still" and "Force Ten"

== Charts ==
Chart (2003)	Peak position
Canadian Albums (Billboard)	17
US Billboard 200	45

== Certifications ==
Region	Certification	Certified units/sales
United Kingdom (BPI)	Gold	100,000^{‡}
United States (RIAA)	Gold	500,000^{^}
^{^} Shipments figures based on certification alone.^{‡} Sales+streaming figures based on certification alone.
