= Second Nature (Rush song) =

Song by Rush

from the album Hold Your Fire
- Released: September 8, 1987
- Recorded: Circa January–April 1987
- Studio: The Manor (Oxford); Ridge Farm (Surrey); AIR Montserrat; McClear Place (Toronto)
- Genre: Soft rock; new age; world music; pop rock
- Length: 4:35
- Label: Anthem
- Composers: Geddy Lee; Alex Lifeson
- Lyricist: Neil Peart
- Producer: Peter Collins

"Second Nature" is the fourth track of Canadian rock band Rush's twelfth studio album Hold Your Fire (1987), released by Anthem Records. The song was penned by drummer Neil Peart, and composed by bassist/lead vocalist Geddy Lee and guitarist Alex Lifeson. It was produced by Peter Collins, who took on the same task for the band's previous album Power Windows (1985).

"Second Nature" is a soft rock power ballad, featuring a new age world music sound and guitar-driven pop rock chorus. A spiritual successor of songs from A Farewell to Kings (1977), such as "Closer to the Heart", it focuses on the need of habituation in man's moral virtue. It is primarily an open letter to the powerful to take action against environmental destruction as second nature, instead of viewing it as an afterthought. The song was left out of the set list for Hold Your Fire's promotional tour, and retrospective critics called it middling, bland, and unexceptional.

== Background ==
"Second Nature" was one of nine songs that came about in Hold Your Fire's first writing sessions at Elora Sound from September 27 to mid-December 1986. With drummer Neil Peart as lyricist per usual, he wanted to do another album on power, similar to Power Windows (1985), but specifically in relation to time; however, writing "Second Nature" and "High Water" influenced him to change the focus to the subconscious drive. The music was composed by guitarist Alex Lifeson, and bassist and lead vocalist Geddy Lee on a keyboard.

Under production of Peter Collins, who had the same job for Power Windows, Hold Your Fire was recorded in January to April 1987 at various English studios. These included Oxford's The Manor Studio, Surrey's Ridge Farm Studio, and AIR Montserrat. Toronto's McClear Place was another recording location. As with "Mission" and "High Water", "Second Nature" features a backing orchestra recorded in March–April 1987 and arranged by Steve Margoshes from New York City. Hold Your Fire was mixed at William Tell Studio in Paris starting May 1, and mastered in mid-July by Lee and Bob Ludwig at Masterdisk. Anthem Records released Hold Your Fire on September 8, 1987, with "Second Nature" as the fourth track. The song was one of four not present on the set list of the album's promotional tour.

== Music ==
"Second Nature"
The song's first verse, sung softly over a soft rock new age world music instrumental, before the pop rock chorus kicks in.

"Second Nature" (4:35) is a soft rock song. It features a new age world music style akin to Mike Oldfield and Tangerine Dream's 1980s work. A piano ballad section opens an arrangement of strings, "evocative piano tones and wispy sonic orchestration" throughout. The chorus consists of the guitar-driven pop rock prominent on Presto (1989) and Roll the Bones (1991). Langdon Hickman compared the overall sound to demos of Casio keyboards in the 1980s and 1990s. Cultural musicologist Durrell Bowman interpreted both "Second Nature" and "Prime Mover" to be meta on Hold Your Fire's dependence on electronic music production techniques, emphasized by the absence of a guitar solo. As Alex Body analyzed, the production is fragile from its tonal contrasts. The track shifts from Lee softly singing in baritone over a piano to heavy drums and distorted guitars, all which accompany a "rapidly moving melody".

== Lyrics ==
Aristotle's perspective on goodness is the basis of "Second Nature".

"Second Nature" is another one of Peart's detached viewpoints on a topic related to a chaotic and problematic world. The lyrics are framed as an "open letter" to industry and political leaders to view destruction of the environment as something to be solved like second nature rather than an afterthought. Following the general album's theme of instinctual drive, "Second Nature" is also about man's requirement to habituate their moral virtue, a concept from Greek philosopher Aristotle's perspectives on the subject. Claims that "too many captains keep on steering us wrong" and we "fight the fire while we're feeding the flame" reflect concerns of the sociopolitical state of the world present throughout Hold Your Fire. While Greg Pratt perceived a critique of modern capitalism, Robert Freedman thought Peart did not discourage the profit motive while requesting leaders to take in the big picture.

According to Peart, the line "I know perfect's not for real / I thought we might get closer/ But I'm ready to make a deal" communicates two messages: "if we can't get perfect, then let's get better" and "even if I could not accept compromise, I would have to accept limitations". Anand Agneshwar noticed the theme of Peart's reluctant downfall from "rock's bastion of human perfection" presented in the line in his review for the Press & Sun-Bulletin.

"Second Nature" was a spiritual successor to songs from A Farewell to Kings (1977), such as "Closer to the Heart" and the title track, in the headcanon of academics. A difference is that it is based on Ancient Greek philosophy and Henry David Thoreau instead of American classical liberalism expressed by the likes of Thomas Jefferson and Benjamin Franklin. For Carol Selby and Robert Price, it was a more sober version of the 1977 album's title song after maturation from Grace Under Pressure's (1984) "Distant Early Warning". As they explain, the men in high places are not living up to the declarations in "Closer to the Heart", forcing the powerless to make a compromise.

Contemporaneous reviewers such as Greg Quill interpreted a variety of messages and themes related to the human condition, such as an expression of impatience with the rate of social progress, and a "legal" and "plaintive" plea for the Golden Rule, connection, commonality, cooperation, and communication of human beings in the "electronic age".

== Reception ==
Upon release, the staff of Circus recommended "Second Nature" along with "Force Ten" and "High Water" for songs on Hold Your Fire that sound like their "vintage" work. As Scouting's Bob Darden gloated, "Long-time Rush fans are probably still in shock over this one." In later decades, music writers have considered "Second Nature" a middling, bland, and boring power ballad. Even sympathizers towards Hold Your Fire, were underwhelmed, including Ryan Reed who called it "one of the band's weakest ballads", and Adrian Begrand who called it "a little too slick" with a "keyboard-drenched arrangement slipping into motivational anthem schlock". Thrillist ranked "Second Nature" the 156th best Rush song out of 187, where Jordan Hoffman compared it to Pete Townshend's 1980s solo albums. Ultimate Classic Rock placed it at 146 in a list of 167 Rush songs.

Daniel Bukszpan called "Second Nature" an unremarkable and "half-formed" experience on an already average tracklist, only "briefly redeemed by the instrumental middle section". Hickman loved its chorus and hated the "mind-bogglingly cheesy" "garbage" surrounding it. Jeff Wagner called "Second Nature" and "Open Secrets" the album's "clutch" and dismissed lyrics such as "Folks have got to make choices / and choices got to have voices" as "dippy". Reed also cringed at the line. Episcopal Church prelate Mark Hollingsworth quoted the chorus and second verse of "Second Nature" in his book Embracing the Gray: A Wing, a Prayer, and a Doubter's Resolve (2023).

Opinions on the sound and instrumentation were divided. Body was impressed with the "musical use of light and shade" that "successfully brings power" to the song. Reed, on the other hand, thought it was brought down by "gooey" synth textures and an arrangement lacking innovation. Pratt sarcastically called the plinky keyboards "totally great", which "serve as a convenient wakeup call to Lifeson who... nope, he doesn't wake up". Hickman was turned off by its "on-the-nose" utilization of a sound and genre most associated with 1980s sitcoms and shopping malls.

== Personnel ==
Rush

- Geddy Lee – bass guitar, synthesizer, vocals
- Alex Lifeson – electric and acoustic guitar
- Neil Peart – drums, percussion

Additional musicians

- Andy Richards – additional keyboard, synthesizer programming
- Steven Margoshes – strings arranger and conductor

Production

- Peter Collins – producer, arrangements
- James "Jimbo" Barton – engineer
- Bob Ludwig – mastering
