= Rush Through Time =

Compilation album by Rush
- Released: May 1979 (Germany); July 3, 1981 (UK)
- Recorded: 1974–1977
- Genres: Hard rock, progressive rock, heavy metal
- Length: 46:27
- Label: Mercury
- Producers: Rush, Terry Brown

Rush chronology
Hemispheres (1978)	Rush Through Time (1979)	Permanent Waves (1980)

Professional ratings
Review scores
Source	Rating
Collector's Guide to Heavy Metal	6/9
The Encyclopedia of Popular Music	2/5 stars
The Virgin Encyclopedia of 80s Music	2/5 stars

Rush Through Time is a compilation album by Rush, released in Europe as a picture disc only in 1979.

In essence, it is a European issue of the Mercury US DJ-Promo disc Everything Your Listeners Ever Wanted To Hear By Rush But You Were Afraid To Play from 1976, but replacing two songs from Caress of Steel with two songs from A Farewell to Kings.

The album was subsequently repackaged as a standard vinyl album with a colour sleeve and updated graphics on the back cover in 1981. According to Rush drummer Neil Peart, the album was issued by the German branch of Polygram Records without the band's input.

== Track listing ==
1. "Fly by Night" (Lee, Peart) – 3:21
2. "Making Memories" (Lee, Lifeson, Peart) – 2:58
3. "Bastille Day" (Lee, Lifeson, Peart) – 4:37
4. "Something for Nothing" (Lee, Peart) – 3:59
5. "Cinderella Man" (Lee, Lifeson) – 4:21
6. "Anthem" (Lee, Lifeson, Peart) – 4:36
7. "Overture/Temples of Syrinx" (Lee, Lifeson, Peart, Hugh Syme) – 6:35
8. "The Twilight Zone" (Lee, Lifeson, Peart) – 3:17
9. "Best I Can" (Lee) – 3:24
10. "Closer to the Heart" (Lee, Lifeson, Peart, Peter Talbot) – 2:53
11. "In the End" (Lee, Lifeson) – 6:48

== Personnel ==
- Geddy Lee – bass guitar, vocals
- Alex Lifeson – acoustic and electric guitars
- Neil Peart – drums and percussion
- Hugh Syme – synthesizer on "Overture”

== Track Origins ==
Tracks 1–2, 6, 9, & 11 from Fly by Night (1975)
Track 3 from Caress of Steel (1975)
Tracks 4 & 7–8 from 2112 (1976)
Tracks 5 & 10 from A Farewell to Kings (1977)
