= Moving Pictures (Rush album) =

Studio album by Rush
- Released: February 12, 1981
- Recorded: October–November 1980
- Studios: Le Studio, Morin-Heights, Quebec, Canada
- Genres: Progressive rock; hard rock
- Length: 40:03
- Label: Anthem
- Producers: Rush; Terry Brown

Rush chronology
Permanent Waves (1980)	Moving Pictures (1981)	Exit... Stage Left (1981)

Singles from Moving Pictures
- 1. "Limelight" Released: February 1981; 2. "Vital Signs" Released: March 1981; 3. "Tom Sawyer" Released: May 1981

Alternative cover
- 40th anniversary reissue

Moving Pictures is the eighth studio album by Canadian rock band Rush, released on February 12, 1981, by Anthem Records. After touring to support their previous album, Permanent Waves (1980), the band started to write and record new material in August 1980 with longtime co-producer Terry Brown. They continued to write songs with a more radio-friendly sound, featuring tighter and shorter song structures compared to their earlier albums.

"Limelight", "Tom Sawyer" and "Vital Signs" were released as singles across 1981, and the instrumental "YYZ" was nominated for a Grammy Award for Best Rock Instrumental Performance. Rush supported the album on tour from February to July 1981. In 2020, Rolling Stone ranked the album number 379 on its list of the "500 Greatest Albums of All Time".

Moving Pictures received a positive reception from contemporary and retrospective music critics and became an instant commercial success. The album reached number one in Canada and number three in both the United States and the United Kingdom. Moving Pictures is the fastest-selling album in the band's catalogue. It was certified Platinum by the RIAA on April 27, 1981 for one million copies sold, just two months after the album's release. It has since been certified Platinum five times over, for five million copies sold in the United States.

== Background and recording ==
In June 1980, the band ended their 10-month tour of the United States, Canada and the United Kingdom in support of their previous album, Permanent Waves (1980). The tour was a commercial success for the group, becoming the first of their career to earn them a profit. During their stop in New York City a month prior, the band decided to scrap plans for a second live album in favor of making a new one in the studio. Cliff Burnstein of Mercury Records suggested the idea to the band, and Neil Peart was particularly enthusiastic about the new ideas that were being developed at sound checks and was keen to put them to tape. Geddy Lee and Alex Lifeson caught on to his enthusiasm. The trio pitched the idea to their manager and producer, who had already mapped out a two-year plan for them, but agreed to the change and cancelled the schedule. Lifeson looked back on this change of plan as the most important one in the band's history since the decision to record 2112 (1976), which became their breakthrough hit. Prior to starting on the album, Rush joined fellow Canadian rock band Max Webster to play on "Battle Scar", a track for their album Universal Juveniles (1980). During the sessions their lyricist Pye Dubois suggested a song that he thought was suitable for Rush; this was developed into "Tom Sawyer", the opening track on Moving Pictures.

The band retreated to Stony Lake, Ontario to write and develop new material. The sessions were productive. "The Camera Eye" was the first song to be worked on, followed by "Tom Sawyer", "Red Barchetta", the instrumental "YYZ", and "Limelight". Lee noticed a change in Peart's lyrics during this time, which had started with Permanent Waves, towards more concise and direct words. Following these sessions, Rush returned to Phase One Studios in late August 1980 with their longtime co-producer Terry Brown and prepared demos of these songs. The tracks were refined further during subsequent rehearsals for a series of warm-up shows across the US in September and October 1980, during which "Tom Sawyer" and "Limelight" were performed live for the first time.

Moving Pictures was recorded at Le Studio in Morin-Heights, Quebec in October and November 1980. Rush and Brown worked with 48-track recording for the first time. They'd record the basic tracks—‌drums and bass—‌to one 24-track tape reel, and transfer a stereo mix of these to a second 24-track reel for overdubs. This allowed them to preserve the quality of their recordings as much as possible as they were able to place the original backing track reel in storage until the mixing stage, thereby reducing potential damage to the tape from frequent playback. They experimented with a pressure zone microphone, a type of boundary microphone that picks up direct sound and no reverberated signals, that was taped onto Peart's chest as he played the drums. The audio captured from it was used to pick up the ambience in the studio room and was inserted into the final mix. Peart is seen wearing the microphone in the music video for "Vital Signs". The album was mixed down onto a Sony digital mastering machine, being an early example of digital recording. However, the completion of the album was delayed by two weeks due to technical issues in the studio, including with the Sony unit, but, as Brown elaborated, "it’s to be expected when you’re pushing the latest gear to its limits".

== Songs ==
=== Side one ===
"Tom Sawyer" features a backbeat in a 4/4 time signature, along with instrumental and closing sections in 7/8. It was the first Rush recording for which Lee used his 1972 Fender Jazz Bass, which provided a punchier lower end than he had been able to obtain with his usual Rickenbacker 4001. The bass became Lee's primary studio instrument from the recording of Counterparts (1993) onward. Lee said the group had more trouble with "Tom Sawyer" than any other song on Moving Pictures, and at times had doubts as to whether it would work. The band had technical difficulties with the computer that mixed the tracks, so they decided to operate the mixing desk manually with each member handling their own set of faders. Peart described it as "an enjoyable work", which took around a day and a half to record, "collapsing afterwards with raw, red, aching hands and feet". Its instrumental section grew from what Lee would play on his synthesizer during sound checks on tour, which initially was forgotten about until the band traded ideas on what the section should be. It became one of the group's best-known songs and a mainstay of subsequent live shows.

Peart's lyrics for "Red Barchetta" were inspired by the short story "A Nice Morning Drive" by Richard S. Foster, originally published in the November 1973 edition of the American car magazine Road & Track. Lee described the tale as "Orwellian in nature", which deals with an individual taking their Barchetta on a fast ride despite the banning of high speeds and is chased after by hovering patrol cars for breaking the law. Instead of an MGB roadster as featured in the original story, Peart reported the Ferrari 166 MM Barchetta was the car that inspired the song's title. In 2007, Foster and Peart met for the first time and shared their mutual interest of BMW motorcycles, which was documented in an article titled "The Drummer, The Private Eye, and Me".

"YYZ" is an instrumental titled after the IATA airport code for Toronto Pearson International Airport; its rhythm is that of the letters "YYZ" in Morse code ( ▄▄▄ ▄ ▄▄▄ ▄▄▄ ▄▄▄ ▄ ▄▄▄ ▄▄▄ ▄▄▄ ▄▄▄ ▄ ▄). It stemmed from the band's enjoyment of recording "La Villa Strangiato", a nine-minute instrumental on Hemispheres (1978); it was something they wanted to do again for Moving Pictures, only shorter. The music originated while Lee and Peart were jamming as a warm-up, during which Lee came up with the main riff and Peart suggested to have a more mellow section with Lee playing keyboards. "And then, almost out of nowhere, we had this song."

The lyrics for "Limelight" are autobiographical and based on Peart's own dissatisfaction with fame and its intrusion into one's personal life. The song contains two self-references: the first, the line "living in a fish-eye lens, caught in the camera eye" references the album's following track, "The Camera Eye", while the line "all the world's indeed a stage, and we are merely players", references the title of the band's first live album All the World's a Stage (1976), itself taken from William Shakespeare's comedy play As You Like It.

=== Side two ===
"The Camera Eye" is a two-part track with sections unofficially titled "New York City" and "London". Peart wrote the lyrics after taking walks in both cities, recalling observations and the rhythms he felt during them. It was the final song the band included on a studio album with a length of over ten minutes, something which was a frequent occurrence on their earlier albums. Its title refers to short pieces of the same name in the U.S.A. trilogy of novels written by American writer John Dos Passos, which Peart admired. The opening of the track features an audio clip of a busy Metropolis city from Richard Donner's Superman (1978).

"Witch Hunt" opens with faint voices, which were recorded on the driveway of Le Studio in sub-zero temperatures, with the band and studio staff shouting in a humorous way while drinking Scotch whisky. Lifeson said one of his lines, "Fucking football", can be heard if the listener tries hard enough. The tracks were overdubbed multiple times until it sounded like what Lee described as a "vigilante mob". The main riff was written by cover designer Hugh Syme on a synthesizer and double-tracked drums in one verse. "Witch Hunt" would become a part of the Fear series of songs, which includes "The Weapon" from Signals (1982), "The Enemy Within" from Grace Under Pressure (1984), and "Freeze" from Vapor Trails (2002), and appeared in reverse chronological album order, except for "Freeze" which is the fourth part and did indeed appear fourth.

"Vital Signs" was the last song the band wrote for the album and was pieced together at Le Studio. Lee has said it was written and recorded in a mostly improvised fashion after it became clear the album was about four minutes short of a standard record's runtime. The track features a sequencer part produced by an Oberheim OB-X synthesizer and shows a distinct reggae flavour. Reggae influences in Rush's music were first heard on Permanent Waves, and would later be heard more extensively on their next two albums.

== Artwork ==
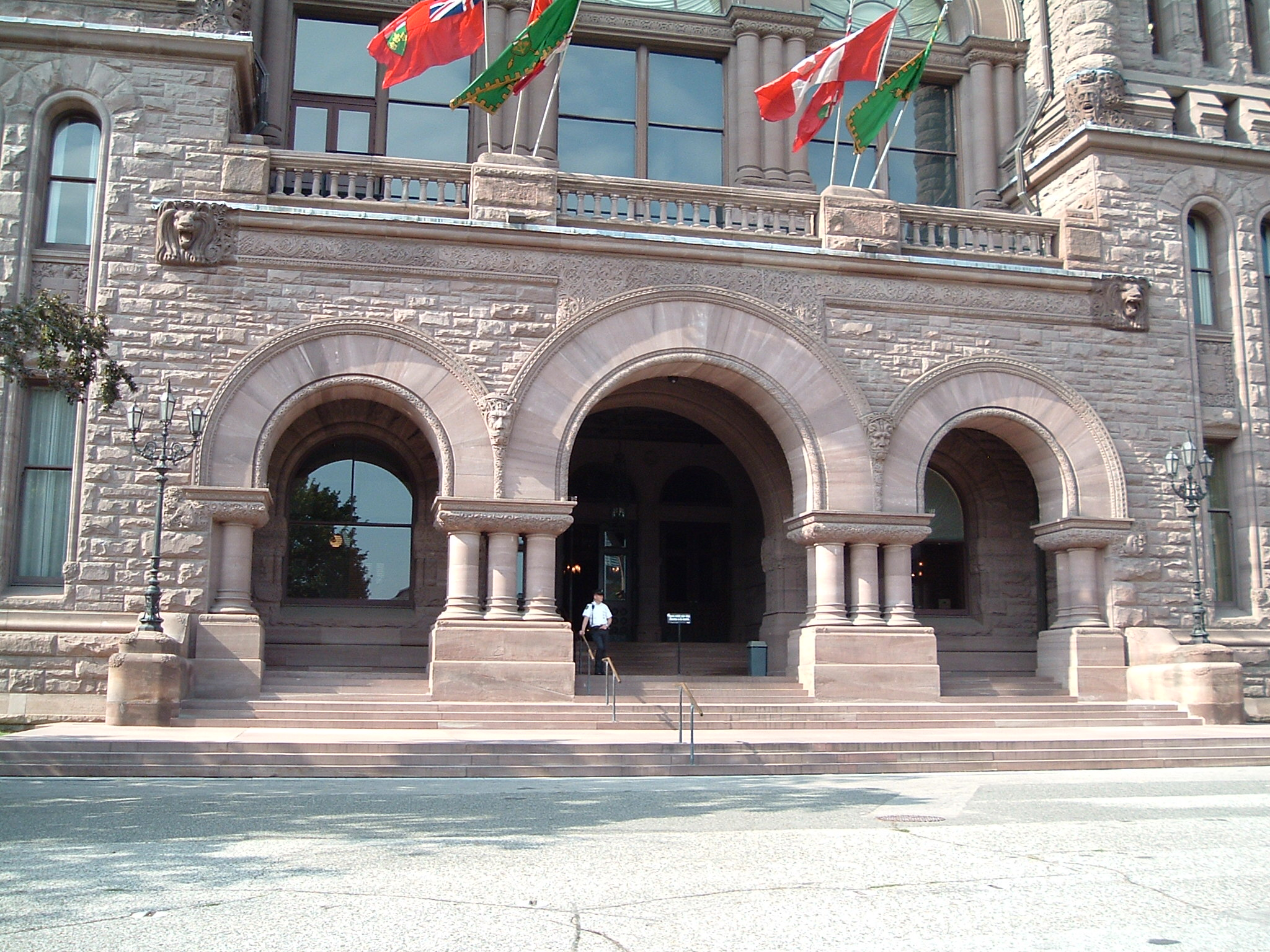
The Ontario Legislature in Queen's Park, Toronto, pictured on the album's front cover

The cover was designed by Hugh Syme who estimated the artwork cost $9,500 to produce. Anthem Records refused to cover the entire bill, leaving the band to pay for the rest. It is a triple entendre; the front depicts movers who are carrying pictures. On the side, people are shown crying because the pictures passing by are emotionally "moving". Finally, the back cover has a film crew making a motion (moving) picture of the whole scene. It was photographed outside the Ontario Legislative Building at Queen's Park, Toronto. The pictures that are being moved are the band's Starman logo featured on the reverse cover of 2112 (1976), one of the Dogs Playing Poker paintings entitled A Friend in Need, and a painting that shows Joan of Arc being burned at the stake. The film crew on the back cover actually shot the scene, from which a single frame was used for the cover. This was revealed to Rush concertgoers several years later when the still image was shown on the stage projector, which suddenly came to life as a film sequence.

Mike Dixon, one of the movers on the cover of Moving Pictures and the band's next album, Exit...Stage Left (1981), discussed the various people on the Moving Pictures cover. The first, Bobby King, seen furthest to the left, was a member of Syme's design team and is credited for assisting Syme on A Farewell to Kings, Hemispheres, and Archives. Dixon explained that King is not only one of the movers, but also the Starman logo and the man in the hat on the Hemispheres cover. The mover holding the Starman painting is Kelly Jay, singer of the Toronto band Crowbar who performed a show with Rush in 1973. Photographer Deborah Samuel is the Joan of Arc character, and her relatives are the family on the right. However, this conflicts with information provided in the Rush biography Chemistry, which states: "Hugh borrowed friends, neighbours and even his hairdresser's parents".

== Release ==
Moving Pictures was played in its entirety during Lee's visit to Rick Ringer's radio show on CHUM-FM in Toronto, on February 11, 1981. The album was released on the following day.

== Reception and legacy ==
Professional ratings
Review scores
Source	Rating
AllMusic	5/5 stars
Classic Rock	(2022)
The Encyclopedia of Popular Music	4/5 stars
The Essential Rock Discography	7/10
MusicHound Rock	4/5 stars
Pitchfork	9.2/10 (2022)
The Rolling Stone Album Guide	4/5 stars
vinyl reviews.	4/5 (2015)
The Virgin Encyclopedia of 80s Music	4/5 stars

Kerrang! magazine listed the album at No. 43 among the "100 Greatest Heavy Metal Albums of All Time". Rolling Stone has listed Moving Pictures at No. 10 on the 2012 readers poll 'Your Favorite Prog Rock Albums of All Time', at No. 3 on the 2015 list '50 Greatest Prog Rock Albums of All Time' (behind Pink Floyd's The Dark Side of the Moon at number one and King Crimson's In the Court of the Crimson King at number two), and at No. 379 on the 2020 edition of its 500 Greatest Albums of All Time. In 2014, readers of the Rhythm voted Moving Pictures the greatest drumming album in the history of progressive rock. Moving Pictures and 2112 (1976) are the two Rush albums listed in 1001 Albums You Must Hear Before You Die. In 2024, Loudwire staff elected it as the best hard rock album of 1981.

Moving Pictures was played live in its entirety for the first time to open the second set during each show of Rush's 2010–11 Time Machine Tour.

In a knockout-style Facebook poll conducted in 2021, the album was voted the best album of the 1980s, narrowly beating out Depeche Mode's 1986 album Black Celebration to take the win with 52% of the vote. More than 22,100 votes were cast in the final round alone.

In 2023, Sean Murphy of PopMatters wrote, "Moving Pictures is, without any question, not only Rush’s masterpiece but one of those rare albums that epitomizes an era. It represents both a culmination and a progression: the peak of the band’s development as well as the blueprint for Rush’s subsequent work." He also credited the album for serving as "a template of sorts" for how rock albums would be produced in the early 1980s. He explained, "Along with King Crimson’s Discipline, Moving Pictures illustrates that the first great era of progressive rock had been taken as far as it could, or should, go."

== Reissues ==
The album was released on compact disc in 1984 by Mercury Records. Initial pressings were missing the first beat of "Tom Sawyer" by mistake but were corrected in subsequent releases. In 1997, Mercury Records released a digitally remastered version. The disc tray has a logo of three fingerprints with "The Rush Remasters" printed, a feature of all remastered albums from Moving Pictures through A Show of Hands, originally found on the cover of Retrospective II. The remaster restores all of the original artwork and lyrics found on the vinyl release (including the picture of Peart that had been left off of the original CD issue).

Moving Pictures was remastered twice in 2011. The first, by Andy VanDette, was for the "Sector" box sets which re-released all of Rush's Mercury-era albums. It is included in the Sector 2 box set. The second reissue was in April 2011, as a two-disc 30th-anniversary set. The first disc contains the standard stereo mix and the second, available as a DVD-Audio or Blu-ray disc, contains the album in a stereo and 5.1 surround sound mix with music videos of the three singles as bonus features.

In 2015, Moving Pictures was remastered for vinyl as part of the "12 Months of Rush" promotion. The mastering was also made available in a 24-bit/48 kHz digital format on various high-resolution online music stores. These remasters have less dynamic range compression than the 1997 and 2011 versions. Sean Magee remastered the album from an analogue copy of the original digital master tape using a 192 kHz sample rate. However, as Moving Pictures was originally mixed on digital equipment at 16-bit/44.1 kHz, no audio above 22 kHz exists in the original master or any of the remasters, which explains why many digital music stores only sell the album with 48 kHz as the maximum available rate.

The band released a 40th anniversary edition of Moving Pictures on April 15, 2022. The five record set includes the 2015 remaster and a previously unreleased live recording of their show at Maple Leaf Gardens in Toronto on March 25, 1981.

== Track listing ==
All lyrics are written by Neil Peart except "Tom Sawyer", by Peart and Pye Dubois; all music is composed by Alex Lifeson and Geddy Lee, except "YYZ", by Lee and Peart.

Side one
No.	Title	Length
1.	"Tom Sawyer"	4:34
2.	"Red Barchetta"	6:10
3.	"YYZ"	4:26
4.	"Limelight"	4:20

Side two
No.	Title	Length
5.	"The Camera Eye" "I" (6:00) ( (Note: Unofficially known as "New York" as it was inspired by that city.)) "II" (5:00) ( (Note: Unofficially known as "London" as it was inspired by that city.))	11:00
6.	"Witch Hunt" (Part III of "Fear" (Note: "Witch Hunt", subtitled "Part III of 'Fear'" is a part of a tetralogy of songs exploring the concept of fear. All songs were written together, but were released in reverse order (except Part IV). "Witch Hunt" is Part III of the tetralogy, 1984's "The Enemy Within" is Part I, 1982's "The Weapon" is Part II, and 2002's "Freeze" is Part IV.))	4:46
7.	"Vital Signs"	4:44
Total length:		40:03

=== 40th Anniversary Edition (2022) ===
The 40th Anniversary Edition's Discs 2 and 3 were recorded live at Maple Leaf Gardens, Toronto, by Guy Charbonneau using Le Mobile Remote Recording – March 24 & 25 1981; Mixed by Terry Brown at Blue Sound & Music, Toronto, ON – December 2020 – February 2021; Technical Assistance: Russ Mackay; Mastered by Peter Moore – 2021.

Compact Disc two: Live in YYZ 1981 (Maple Leaf Gardens (March 24 & 25 1981)
No.	Title	Music	Length
1.	"2112" – "Overture"		4:26
2.	"2112" – "The Temples of Syrinx"		2:17
3.	"Freewill"		5:51
4.	"Limelight"		4:47
5.	"Cygnus X-1 Book II: Hemispheres" – "Prelude"		4:23
6.	"Beneath, Between & Behind"		2:51
7.	"The Camera Eye" "I" (5:49) "II" (5:13)		11:02
8.	"YYZ"	Lee, Lifeson, Peart	7:55
9.	"Broon's Bane"	Lifeson	0:50
10.	"The Trees"		4:20
11.	"Xanadu"		12:48
Total length:			101:33

Disc three: Live in YYZ 1981 [cont'd]
No.	Title	Lyrics	Music	Length
1.	"The Spirit of Radio"			5:24
2.	"Red Barchetta"			6:55
3.	"Closer to the Heart"	Peart, Peter Talbot		3:42
4.	"Tom Sawyer"	Peart, Dubois		4:59
5.	"Vital Signs"			5:23
6.	"Natural Science" I. "Tide Pools" (2:11) II. "Hyperspace" (2:45) III. "Permanent Waves" (3:33)			8:29
7.	"Working Man" / "Cygnus X-1 Book II: Hemispheres" – "Armageddon: The Battle of Heart and Mind" / "By-Tor & The Snow Dog" / "In The End" / "In The Mood" / "2112" – "Grand Finale" (medley)			12:32
8.	"La Villa Strangiato"		Lee, Lifeson, Peart	10:03
Total length:				159:00

== Personnel ==
Credits are adapted from the album's 1981 liner notes.

Rush

- Geddy Lee – bass guitars, oberheim polyphonic OB-X, mini-moog, bass pedals, vocals
- Alex Lifeson – 6 and 12 string electric and acoustic guitars, bass pedals
- Neil Peart – drums, timbales, gong, orchestra bells, glockenspiel, wind chimes, bell tree, crotales, cowbell, plywood

Additional musician

- Hugh Syme – synthesizer (on "Witch Hunt")

Production

- Rush – production, arrangements
- Terry Brown – production, arrangements
- Paul Northfield – engineer
- Robbie Whelan – assistant engineer
- Albert, Huey, Dewey and Louie – computerized companions
- Peter Jensen – digital mastering, editing
- Bob Ludwig at Masterdisk – original mastering
- Deborah Samuel – photography
- Hugh Syme – art direction, graphics, cover concept
- Ray Danniels and Vic Wilson, SRO Productions – management
- Moon Records – executive production

== Charts ==
=== Weekly charts ===
Chart (1981)	Peak position
Canada Top Albums/CDs (RPM)	1
Dutch Albums (Album Top 100)	19
Norwegian Albums (VG-lista)	34
Swedish Albums (Sverigetopplistan)	32
UK Albums (Official Charts)	3
US Billboard 200	3

Chart (2022)	Peak position
Belgian Albums (Ultratop Flanders)	67
Canadian Albums (Billboard)	19
Dutch Albums (Album Top 100)	46
German Albums (Offizielle Top 100)	22
Japanese Albums (Oricon)	41
Swiss Albums (Schweizer Hitparade)	72
US Top Rock Albums (Billboard)	1

Chart (2026)	Peak position
Greek Albums (IFPI)	46

=== Year-end charts ===
Chart (1981)	Position
Canada Top Albums/CDs (RPM)	7
UK Albums (BRMB)	59
US Billboard 200	18
US Top Pop Albums (Cash Box)	11

== Certifications ==
Region	Certification	Certified units/sales
Canada (Music Canada)	4× Platinum	400,000^{^}
United Kingdom (BPI)	Gold	100,000^{‡}
United States (RIAA)	5× Platinum	5,000,000^{‡}
^{^} Shipments figures based on certification alone.^{‡} Sales+streaming figures based on certification alone.
