= The Boomers (band) =

Canadian rock band

- Origin: Canada
- Genres: Rock
- Years active: 1991–2002
- Members: Ian Thomas, Peter Cardinali, Rick Gratton, Bill Dillon
- Past members: Neil Chapman, Tim Tickner

The Boomers are a Canadian rock band from Ontario. Also known as The Boomers YYZ. Although their first album What We Do was not initially a commercial success in Canada, it became a cult hit in Germany, leading to a tour in 1991. This success prompted the band to record The Art of Living; the single "You Gotta Know" was a hit in Canada.

== Discography ==
=== Albums ===
Year	Title
1991	What We Do
1993	Art of Living
1996	25,000 Days
2002	Midway

=== Singles ===
Year	Title	Chart positions			Album
Year	Title	Canada RPM 100	Canada A/C	US Hot 100	Album
1991	"Love You Too Much"	41	32	-	What We Do
1991	"One Little Word"	49	29	-	What We Do
1991	"Wishes"	68	28	-	What We Do
1993	"You've Got to Know"	20	26	-	Art of Living
1993	"Art of Living"	41	-	-	Art of Living
1994	"Good Again"	68	-	-	Art of Living
1996	"I Feel a Change Coming"	17	15	-	25 Thousand Days
1997	"Saving Face"	18	24	-	25 Thousand Days
2002	"I Want to Believe in Something"	-	-	-	Midway
