= A Show of Hands =

Live album by Rush
- Released: January 9, 1989
- Recorded: 1986, 1988
- Genres: Progressive rock, new wave, synth rock
- Length: 74:22
- Label: Anthem
- Producer: Rush

Rush chronology
Hold Your Fire (1987)	A Show of Hands (1989)	Presto (1989)

Professional ratings
Review scores
Source	Rating
AllMusic	3.5/5 stars
The Encyclopedia of Popular Music	3/5 stars
The Essential Rock Discography	5/10
Kerrang!	4/5 stars
MusicHound Rock	2.5/5 stars
Rolling Stone	1.5/5 stars
The Rolling Stone Album Guide	2/5 stars
The Virgin Encyclopedia of 80s Music	3/5 stars

A Show of Hands is a live album by the Canadian rock band Rush, released in 1989. The band released a video of the same name, originally on VHS and LaserDisc, the same year. A DVD version was released as part of a box set in 2006, and as an individual DVD in 2007. In 2015, it was reissued after being remastered by Sean Magee at Abbey Road Studios following a direct approach by Rush to remaster their entire back catalogue.

== Recording ==
The majority of the performances on this album were from the 1988 Hold Your Fire tour, recorded in the American cities of New Orleans, Phoenix, and San Diego, and the British city of Birmingham. "Mystic Rhythms" and "Witch Hunt" were recorded in East Rutherford, New Jersey, during the 1986 Power Windows tour. The opening track "Intro" features The Three Stooges theme playing in the background; the band used this music to open many of their concerts during the 1980s.

With the exception of "Closer to the Heart", the tracklist focuses almost entirely on the band's material from the 1980s, and is Rush's only live record to feature no performances of songs released before 1977. Unlike All the World's a Stage and Exit... Stage Left, this album does not have any songs that had to be omitted for single CD release. The first two were released prior to the introduction of compact discs and were double album sets. A Show of Hands was initially released on CD; as such, time restrictions were already taken into account.

== Video release ==
The video was filmed at the first of two Birmingham (UK) shows which took place on April 23–24, 1988 at the city's NEC Arena - one of the sources of the live album. The song order and selection of the video are different from the live album. The laserdisc release also includes the song "Lock and Key".

== Singles ==
- "Closer to the Heart" / "Witch Hunt" (7")
- "Mission" (12" promo)
- "Marathon" (12"/CD promo)

== Track listing ==
All songs written by Alex Lifeson, Geddy Lee and Neil Peart, except where noted.

Side one
No.	Title	Location	Length
1.	"Introduction"		0:53
2.	"The Big Money"	Birmingham, UK	5:59
3.	"Subdivisions"	Birmingham, UK	5:22
4.	"Marathon"	Birmingham, UK	6:39

Side two
No.	Title	Location	Length
1.	"Turn the Page"	New Orleans, LA	4:41
2.	"Manhattan Project"	Phoenix, AZ	5:18
3.	"Mission"	San Diego, CA	5:46

Side three
No.	Title	Writer(s)	Location	Length
1.	"Distant Early Warning"		Birmingham, UK	5:15
2.	"Mystic Rhythms"		Meadowlands, NJ	5:32
3.	"Witch Hunt" (Part III of "Fear")		Meadowlands, NJ	4:00
4.	"The Rhythm Method"	Peart	Birmingham, UK	4:37

- Track 4 features a drum solo.

Side four
No.	Title	Writer(s)	Location	Length
1.	"Force Ten"	Lifeson, Lee, Peart, Pye Dubois	Phoenix, AZ	4:55
2.	"Time Stand Still"		Birmingham, UK	5:13
3.	"Red Sector A"		Birmingham, UK	5:18
4.	"Closer to the Heart"	Lifeson, Lee, Peart, Peter Talbot	Birmingham, UK	4:54

== Personnel ==
=== Rush ===
- Geddy Lee – bass guitar, synthesizers, vocals
- Alex Lifeson – guitars, synthesizers, backing vocals
- Neil Peart – acoustic and electronic percussion

=== Production ===
- Paul Northfield – engineering, mixing
- Guy Charbonneau – engineering
- Dave Roberts – assistant engineer (Le Mobile)
- Gary Stewart and Peter Craigie – assistant engineers (Advision Mobile)
- Rick Andersen – assistant mix engineer (McClear Place)
- Bob Ludwig at Masterdisk – original mastering
- Fin Costello and Dimo Safari – photography
- Hugh Syme – art direction and design
- Ray Danniels, SRO Productions – management
- Val Azzoli – executive production

== Charts ==
Chart (1989)	Peak position
Dutch Albums (Album Top 100)	38
Finnish Albums (Suomen virallinen lista)	7
German Albums (Offizielle Top 100)	35
Swedish Albums (Sverigetopplistan)	28
UK Albums (Official Charts)	12
US Billboard 200	21

== Certifications ==
Region	Certification	Certified units/sales
Canada (Music Canada)	Platinum	100,000^{^}
United States (RIAA)	Gold	500,000^{^}
^{^} Shipments figures based on certification alone.

== Remaster details ==
A Show of Hands was remastered in 2011 by Andy VanDette for the "Sector" box sets, which re-released all of Rush's Mercury-era albums. A Show Of Hands is included in the Sector 3 set.
