= YYZ (song) =

1981 rock instrumental by Rush

Instrumental by Rush

from the album Moving Pictures
- Released: February 12, 1981
- Recorded: 1980
- Genre: Instrumental rock; progressive rock; jazz fusion
- Length: 4:25
- Label: Mercury
- Songwriters: Geddy Lee; Neil Peart
- Producers: Rush; Terry Brown

Rush instrumental chronology
"La Villa Strangiato" (1978)	"YYZ" (1981)	"Where's My Thing" (1991)

Audio sample
- file; help

Music video
- "YYZ" on YouTube

"YYZ" (natively pronounced /waɪ waɪ zɛd/ WY-WY-ZED) is an instrumental rock composition by the Canadian rock band Rush from their 1981 album Moving Pictures. The live album Exit... Stage Left (1981) and the concert video recording A Show of Hands (1989) both include versions in which Neil Peart incorporates a drum solo – as an interlude on the former, and as a segue out of the piece on the latter.

== Title and composition ==
YYZ is the IATA airport identification code of Toronto Pearson International Airport, near Rush's hometown. A VHF omnidirectional range system at the airport broadcasts the YYZ identifier code in Morse code. Neil Peart and Geddy Lee were introduced to the rhythm as Alex Lifeson flew them into the airport. Peart recalled:

The rhythm stuck in my head and I said, ‘Guys, let's—’ you know? So then, thematically we said, ‘Well, let’s use that airport — so much a part of our lives in those days and after — let’s use that as a metaphor in a sense. And again, in a playful way, there was no sense of ‘Okay, this part is this part’ and all that. But there is the sense of bustling and coming and going and the grand emotion of that middle section of what airports can be. [...] In our lives, airports were rich with symbolism. Departures and comings and goings; departures and arrivals. Separations and meetings, you know? That was kind of woven into the song in a playful way. [...] When you strip away the modern-day tedium, [airports are] pretty romantic places.

The piece's introduction, played in a time signature of 10/8, repeatedly renders "Y-Y-Z" in Morse code using various musical arrangements.

"YYZ" rendered in Morse code
Y	Y	Z
. - -	. - -	- . .

== Recording ==
The recording of YYZ took place at Le Studio in Morin-Heights, Quebec, in the summer of 1980.

Peart used the crotales for the Morse code-inspired rhythm. The crashing noise heard the breaks in the between the guitar solo are the sound of wind chimes tied to a 2x4 plywood sheet smacked against a wood table.

== Personnel ==
Sources:

- Geddy Lee – bass guitars, keyboards
- Alex Lifeson – guitars
- Neil Peart – drums, crotales, wind chimes, plywood

== Music video ==
An official animated music video was released on YouTube on March 11, 2022 to coincide with the release of the 40th anniversary edition of Moving Pictures. The video contains many elements from the parent album cover, and depicts a heist in Toronto. It also contains various easter eggs referencing Rush's other work, such as a fast food chain named Fried by Night, based on their album Fly by Night.

== Awards and nominations ==
"YYZ" was nominated for a Grammy in the Best Rock Instrumental category in 1982. It lost to "Behind My Camel" by The Police, from their album Zenyatta Mondatta.

== See also ==
- List of songs recorded by Rush
- List of Rush instrumentals
