= Hold Your Fire =

Studio album by Rush
- Released: September 8, 1987
- Recorded: January 5 – April 24, 1987
- Studios: The Manor (Oxfordshire); Ridge Farm (Surrey); AIR (Montserrat); McClear Place (Toronto); Mirage (Oldham); Guillaume Tell (Paris)
- Genres: New wave; pop; synth-rock; stadium rock; progressive rock
- Length: 50:21
- Label: Anthem
- Producers: Rush; Peter Collins

Rush chronology
Power Windows (1985)	Hold Your Fire (1987)	A Show of Hands (1989)

Singles from Hold Your Fire
- 1. "Time Stand Still" Released: October 19, 1987; 2. "Prime Mover" Released: April 11, 1988

Hold Your Fire is the twelfth studio album by Canadian progressive rock band Rush, released on September 8, 1987. It was recorded at The Manor Studio in Oxfordshire, Ridge Farm Studio in Surrey, AIR Studios in Montserrat and McClear Place in Toronto. Hold Your Fire was the last Rush studio album released outside Canada by PolyGram/Mercury. 'Til Tuesday bassist and vocalist Aimee Mann contributed vocals to "Time Stand Still", and appeared in the Zbigniew Rybczyński-directed video.

The album was not as commercially successful as most of the band's releases of the 1980s, peaking at number 13 on the Billboard charts, the lowest chart peak for a Rush album since 1978's Hemispheres. However, it was eventually certified Gold by the RIAA.

== Writing ==
After Rush's 1986 Power Windows tour ended, the band members took the summer off to spend more time with their families. A few months passed, and the group decided to start getting back into writing material. Neil Peart began writing lyrics in a cottage in early September. Meanwhile, Geddy Lee started to compose on his keyboard setup controlled on a Macintosh computer using software called Digital Performer, which would be useful for both the writing and production stages, and Alex Lifeson was doing experimental tapes at home. Peart also used the Mac to write some lyrics for the album. Peart wanted to do something in the same vein as Power Windows, this time working around the theme of time. However, after writing lyrics for the first song he wrote, "Time Stand Still", Peart started to create more material that would turn the theme into "Instinct," which was the reason for titling the album Hold Your Fire. In an afternoon later that month, Peart and Lee together showed what they had been working on, and also discussed a few lyrical ideas they weren't able to write on paper, which would be included in "Mission," "Open Secrets" and "Turn the Page."

The group started writing sessions in Elora Sound Studio, Ontario on September 27, 1986. Lifeson showed his experimental tapes, while Lee brought soundcheck jams he had done that year. According to Peart, Lifeson's tapes "would yield some good parts for several songs" and Lee's soundcheck jams were "sorted and labeled as potential verses, bridges, choruses or instrumental bits, and thus they served as a reference library of spontaneous ideas that could be drawn upon at will." Lifeson used a drum machine to write drum parts, which Lee tracked on a Lerxst Sound recorder. By early November, eight songs had been written, which the group felt wasn't enough for the album to have a good amount of musical variety. Peart said, "We decided we'd go a bit further this time. We were aware of the fact that only a small percentage of people actually buy records anymore, the vast majority choosing cassettes or CDs. Thus, we figured, why should we worry about the time limitations of the old vinyl disc? We thought we'd like to have 10 songs, and go for 50 minutes or so of music. So we did." Producer Peter Collins came in to Elora Sound in early December to give the band suggestions to improve the songs. Among many small changes, a couple of major suggestions were new verses to "Mission" and chorus revisions to "Open Secrets." With nine songs already written, Collins also suggested the band make a 10th track for the album, and the song "Force Ten" would be written on the last day of pre-production, December 14.

== Production ==
Recording of Hold Your Fire began January 5, 1987, at The Manor Studio in England. This was where the drums, bass, basic keyboards, lead guitars and lead vocals were recorded. The keyboards, guitars and vocals were recorded digitally, while the drums and bass, as preferred by Peart, were taped using an analog tape recorder, later converted into a digital tape. On February 7, the band went to Ridge Farm Studio for Andy Richards to perform additional dynamic keyboards and exciting "events," as well as put all recorded instrument tracks into a digital machine. Lifeson was also able to write guitar overdubs while recording at Ridge Farm.

The band headed off to AIR Montserrat on March 1 to start producing guitar overdubs, and later to McClear Place Studios in Toronto three weeks later to finish the overdubs, record orchestral arrangements by Steve Margoshes for "High Water," "Mission" and "Second Nature," and track additional voice parts, such as Aimee Mann's vocals for "Time Stand Still", and gospel choir. Recording was finished by April 24, and mixing took place starting May 7 at William Tell Studio in Paris. Lee mastered the album with Bob Ludwig at Masterdisk in New York City by mid-July.

Lee played a Wal bass guitar for Hold Your Fire, as well as being vocalist and keyboardist. The synths and other electronic instruments and devices used, all programmed with the assistance of Andy Richards and Jim Burgess, were several Akai S900 samplers, two Prophet synths, a PPG 2.3, a Roland Super Jupiter and a D-550, two Yamaha KX-76 MIDI controllers, two QX-I sequencers and a DX-7, two MIDI Mappers, Korg MIDI pedals, and Moog Taurus Pedals. Peart played on a combination of Ludwig-Musser drum set, a plated-hardware of Pearl Drums, Premier drums and Tama drums, Avedis Zildjian cymbals, and a Simmons pad through one of the Akai samplers, which made sounds of temple blocks, a timbale, crotales, a Tama, a gong bass drum, cowbells, wind chimes, and marimbas.

The song "Tai Shan" was an experiment in composition. It was influenced by classical Chinese music, and its title was a reference to Mount Tai in China's Shandong province, which Peart first became aware of during a bicycle trip in China. A backward sample of Aimee Mann's vocals from another track is used at the end of the song. In a 2009 interview with Blender, Lee expressed regret in including "Tai Shan" on the album, calling it an "error" and saying "we should have known better." Lifeson called the song "a little corny" in a 2012 interview with Total Guitar. Lifeson, in 2016, considered "Tai Shan" and "Panacea" the worst songs Rush ever recorded.

== Music ==
Hold Your Fire has been described as the apex of Rush's 1980s synth-rock era and has been categorized as new wave, pop, heavy metal/hard rock, stadium progressive rock, and "thin and reedy" progressive Britpop. The songs are driven by bass guitar that is a mixture of punchy and melodic. Although there are moments of distorted, extreme leads, Lifeson's electric guitar work on the album is mainly textural, with Steel-string acoustic guitar serving a rhythmic role, causing a glossy overall sound.

== Lyrics ==
Hold Your Fire comments on the socio-political state of the modern world, with the existential angst of The Joshua Tree (1987) by U2.

== Reception ==
=== Contemporaneous ===
Contemporaneous reviews
Review scores
Source	Rating
The Evening Sun	1.5/4
Kerrang!	5/5
Metal Hammer	6/6
NME	3/10
Omaha World-Herald	2.5/5
Sounds	5/5

Music publications such as Metal Hammer, Kerrang! and Sounds awarded Hold Your Fire perfect scores. Kerrang!'s Stefan Chirazi claimed it was one of the best albums of 1987, another Rush LP with "class, quality and consistency" and a rare record to contain ten perfect tracks. Sounds' Paul Elliot praised the band for not losing their "warmth", "heart" and "humanity" despite the studio polish twelve albums in.

Rush's progression with Hold Your Fire was a prominent topic, with a variety of responses. On the positive side, some critics perceived the band continually expanding their musical and sonic territory while maintaining their perfectionism and compositional intricacies. Some appreciated the album for being more accessible to mainstream listeners and having tighter compositions than prior records.

Less favorably, Guitar for the Practicing Musician and the Omaha World-Herald categorized the record as Rush's most-stale tropes prominent in all of their albums, but combined with a sterile, predictable, technically-sophisticated, and synthesizer-heavy sound characteristic of the group in the 1980s. NME, a publication that historically panned Rush's music and their socio-political beliefs, joked, "Locked in a timewarp along with the music, [Peart] is still bent on devising an LP based on a concept." At worst, Nester Aparicio of The Evening Sun labeled the overall product "wimpy" and "fluffy", with none of the "glory" of albums like 2112 and Moving Pictures. Elliot and the Press & Sun-Bulletin's Anand Agneshwar described the lyrics as human and personal, with vulnerability and introspection. Conversely, "they are too cumbersome and distanced to be embraceable" for Guitar for the Practicing Musician.

Hold Your Fire peaked number 13 in the Billboard 200 album chart, the first time a Rush studio album outside the Top 10 since 1978's Hemispheres. Although Hold Your Fire was certified gold in the United States shortly after its release, it failed to reach platinum status according to the RIAA, becoming the first Rush studio album to not do so since 1975's Caress of Steel.

=== Retrospective ===
Music guides and retrospective reviews
Review scores
Source	Rating
AllMusic	3/5 stars
The Encyclopedia of Popular Music	3/5 stars
The Essential Rock Discography	5/10
Metal Storm	7.7/10
MusicHound Rock	2.5/5 stars
The Rolling Stone Album Guide	2/5 stars
Sputnikmusic	4/5
The Virgin Encyclopedia of 80s Music	2/5 stars

For Adrien Begrand, Hold Your Fire was the best Rush album of the era starting with Signals, containing a much smoother balance between the U2/Big Country-style rock and cutting-edge electronic sounds than Power Windows. Conversely, Loudwire's Jordan Blum considered it the worst of the band's keyboard era, an "uninteresting and awkward slog that can't help but feel dated and misguided".

2010s and 2020s rankings of Rush studio albums generally placed Hold Your Fire near or at the bottom. Very few put them in the middle. However, opinions towards the album, even for rankings that placed the album last, were mixed rather than outright negative. They noted their technical proficiency and self-reflective lyrics but also a lack of "dynamic punch", energy and "quirkiness" of their better albums. They most prominently discussed the album's smooth production, which was the considered the slickest in the band's discography and alienating to fans. They also were the harshest of tracks outside of "Time Stand Still", "Force Ten" and "Mission", calling them "bland" and "forgettable" "filler", where the "songwriting quality-control dips as the record progresses".

== Reissues ==
A remaster was issued in 1997.

- The tray has a picture of three fingerprints, light blue, pink, and lime green (left to right) with "The Rush Remasters" printed in all capital letters just to the left, mirroring the cover art of Retrospective II. All remasters from Moving Pictures through A Show of Hands are like this.
- Includes all the artwork that came with the original album, except for the lyrics to "Prime Mover".

Hold Your Fire was remastered again in 2011 by Andy VanDette for the "Sector" box sets, which re-released all of Rush's Mercury-era albums. It is included in the Sector 3 set. For the 2011 remaster, master tapes containing different mixes of Hold Your Fire were inadvertently used, with the result that the mix is noticeably different from previous releases in several places; particularly during "Mission", where string parts that were not present on the original release can be heard, and in the introduction to "Tai Shan", where wind chimes have been added. There is also a panning stereo effect on the vocals during the first pre-chorus of "Turn the Page" which is absent from the original mix.

In 2015 it was reissued after being remastered by Sean Magee at Abbey Road Studios following a direct approach by Rush to remaster their entire back catalogue.

== Track listing ==
All lyrics are written by Neil Peart except "Force Ten" by Peart and Pye Dubois; all music is composed by Geddy Lee and Alex Lifeson.

Side one
No.	Title	Length
1.	"Force Ten"	4:31
2.	"Time Stand Still"	5:09
3.	"Open Secrets"	5:38
4.	"Second Nature"	4:36
5.	"Prime Mover"	5:19

Side two
No.	Title	Length
1.	"Lock and Key"	5:09
2.	"Mission"	5:16
3.	"Turn the Page"	4:55
4.	"Tai Shan"	4:17
5.	"High Water"	5:33

== Personnel ==
Rush

- Geddy Lee – bass guitar, synthesizers, bass pedals, vocals
- Alex Lifeson – electric and acoustic guitars
- Neil Peart – drums, percussion, electronic percussion

Additional musicians

- Aimee Mann – additional vocals
- Andy Richards – additional keyboards, synthesizer programming
- Jim Burgess – synthesizer programming
- Steven Margoshes – string arrangements, conductor
- The William Fairey Engineering Brass Band arranged and conducted by Andrew Jackman

Production

- Rush – producer, arrangements
- Peter Collins – producer, arrangements
- James "Jimbo" Barton – engineer, mixing
- Michael Ade – assistant engineer (The Manor)
- Reynold Swan – assistant engineer (Ridge Farm)
- Ken Blair – assistant engineer (AIR)
- Martin Lee – assistant engineer (McClear Place)
- Philip Cusset – assistant engineer (Guillaume Tell)
- Bob Ludwig at Masterdisk – original mastering
- Glen Wexler – photography
- Hugh Syme – art direction
- Ray Danniels, SRO Productions – management
- Moon Records (Val Azzoli and Liam Birt) – executive production

== Charts ==
=== Weekly charts ===
Weekly chart performance for Hold Your Fire
Chart (1987)	Peak position
Canadian Albums (RPM100)	9
Dutch Albums (Album Top 100)	40
Finnish Albums (Suomen virallinen lista)	9
German Albums (Offizielle Top 100)	34
Swedish Albums (Sverigetopplistan)	21
Japanese Albums (Oricon)	67
UK Albums (Official Charts)	10
US Billboard 200	13

=== Year-end charts ===
1987 year-end chart performance for Hold Your Fire
Chart (1987)	Position
Canada Top Albums/CDs (RPM)	56

== Singles and chart positions ==
Information
"Time Stand Still"
- Released: October 19, 1987
- Written by: Geddy Lee, Alex Lifeson and Neil Peart
- Produced by: Peter Collins and Rush
- Chart positions: No. 3 US Mainstream Rock; number 41 UK
"Force Ten"
- Written by: Geddy Lee, Alex Lifeson, Neil Peart and Pye Dubois
- Produced by: Peter Collins and Rush
- Chart positions: number 3 US Mainstream Rock
"Lock and Key"
- Written by: Geddy Lee, Alex Lifeson and Neil Peart
- Produced by: Peter Collins and Rush
- Chart positions: number 16 US Mainstream Rock
"Prime Mover"
- Released: April 11, 1988
- Written by: Geddy Lee, Alex Lifeson and Neil Peart
- Produced by: Peter Collins and Rush
- Chart positions: number 43 UK

== Certifications ==
Certifications for Hold Your Fire
Region	Certification	Certified units/sales
Canada (Music Canada)	Platinum	100,000^{^}
United Kingdom (BPI)	Silver	60,000^{^}
United States (RIAA)	Gold	500,000^{^}
^{^} Shipments figures based on certification alone.
