= Mission (song) =

Promotional single by Rush

from the album A Show of Hands
- Released: 1989 (live version)
- Recorded: 1988
- Genre: Rock
- Length: 5:16
- Label: Anthem, Mercury
- Songwriters: Geddy Lee, Alex Lifeson, Neil Peart
- Producers: Peter Collins and Rush

Rush singles chronology
"Time Stand Still" (1987)	"Mission" (1989)	"Show Don't Tell" (1989)

"Mission" is a song by Canadian rock band Rush from the 1987 album Hold Your Fire.

== Writing and structure ==
"Mission" was inspired from a conversation Neil Peart and Geddy Lee had about people who were not satisfied with the lives of people in their age group. Peart said that the lyrics are related to a tendency that people have for idealizing the lifestyle of others. People tend to imagine that those who are rich and famous are to be viewed as people who have fewer personal issues than ordinary people. However, he argues that every life has its own level of "toughness." As an example of this idea, he recounts that people used to refer to him as someone who has the best job in the world. He claims that he is very proud of being a musician, which was a job that he dreamed of in his youth. However, he claims people tend not to realize that being away from family for several months while on tour is not as easy as others make it sound. A key verse to express that concept says "We each pay a fabulous price for our visions of paradise," referring to personal sacrifices he had to make to achieve his dream.

A Sputnikmusic review gave a description of "Mission" as a "rocky ballad." It plays in a D major key, though key changes into Bmajor occur in certain parts of the song. Most of the song is played at a moderate tempo in a time signature of common time. However, the musical interlude between the second chorus and final verse is played in 5/4 time. The song features prominent keyboard parts played by Geddy Lee. When working on the song in Britain, producer Peter Collins added brass and choir instrumentation. The brass was performed by the William Faery brass band, and was recorded in Oldham, England. Collins also suggested that new verses be added to the song. A marimba solo is played in the song, in unison with the snare drum and bass. The marimba was a KAT mini-marimba sampled in the AKAI S-900 sampler.

== Critical reception ==
Music critics gave "Mission" good reviews. Metal Storm considered the song, along with "Lock and Key", a classic moment from Hold Your Fire, highlighting its "grandiose chorus". The song was called by Allmusic a "sheer beauty". SaiseiTunes opined it was filled with "some stellar moments" even though it "tends to drag a bit here and there".

== Live performances ==
"Mission" was performed live during the Hold Your Fire tour (1988), the Presto tour (1990), and the Snakes & Arrows tour (2007–2008).

== Charts ==
The live version from "A Show of Hands" was issued as a promo disc and charted on the Mainstream Rock Chart in March 1989.

Chart	Peak position
US Hot Mainstream Rock Tracks (Billboard)	33

== See also ==
- List of Rush songs
