= Time Stand Still (song) =

1987 single by Rush

Single by Rush featuring Aimee Mann

from the album Hold Your Fire
- B-side: "High Water" (US); "Force Ten" (UK)
- Released: October 19, 1987
- Genre: Pop
- Length: 5:09
- Label: Anthem (Canada); Mercury (US)
- Songwriters: Neil Peart; Geddy Lee; Alex Lifeson
- Producers: Rush; Peter Collins

Rush singles chronology
"Mystic Rhythms" (1986)	"Time Stand Still" (1987)	"Prime Mover" (1988)

Music video
- "Time Stand Still" on YouTube

"Time Stand Still" is a song by Canadian progressive rock band Rush, released in 1987 as the lead single from their twelfth studio album Hold Your Fire. The song features American singer-songwriter Aimee Mann. It peaked at No. 3 on the U.S. Mainstream Rock chart on November 6, 1987, and was a minor hit single in the United Kingdom, peaking at No. 42 on the UK Singles Chart. A music video for the song was directed by Zbigniew Rybczyński. On June 7, 2026, Aimee Mann joined Rush on stage to play the song live for the first time without the use of a backing track.

== Development and composition ==
"Time Stand Still" was the first track Neil Peart wrote for Hold Your Fire. According to Peart, he wrote the lyrics for "Time Stand Still" based on his time with Rush:

"All through the '70s our lives were flying by; we spent so much time on the road that it became like a dark tunnel. You start to think about the people you're neglecting, friends and family. So the song is about stopping to enjoy that; with a warning against too much looking back. Instead of getting nostalgic about the past, it's more a plea for the present."

"Time Stand Still" is in the key of E major. The tempo is moderately fast. The song starts in 7/4 before going to common time by the first verse. 'Til Tuesday frontwoman Aimee Mann briefly sings in each chorus of the song, marking Rush's first collaboration with another vocalist; Rush guitarist Alex Lifeson adding that the band thought a female singer "would suit the song". Initially, the band had hoped to recruit Cyndi Lauper to sing the part, then later approached the Pretenders' Chrissie Hynde because, according to Lifeson, "we thought she'd be perfect. But Chrissie was unavailable at the time." Rush later recruited Mann and paid her $2,000 to sing on the track, with Lifeson saying that "her voice blends with Geddy [Lee]'s perfectly and I think it creates the right atmosphere for the song. It's just something new for Rush."

== Critical reception ==
Chris Welch of Kerrang! praised it as "glowing brilliance which deserves serious chart attention for its haunting guitar, frantic drums and intense vocals." In 2013, PopMatters writer Adrian Begrand listed "Time Stand Still" at #8 on his "10 Songs That Will Make You Love Rush", calling it "Rush's best pop moment."

== Music video ==
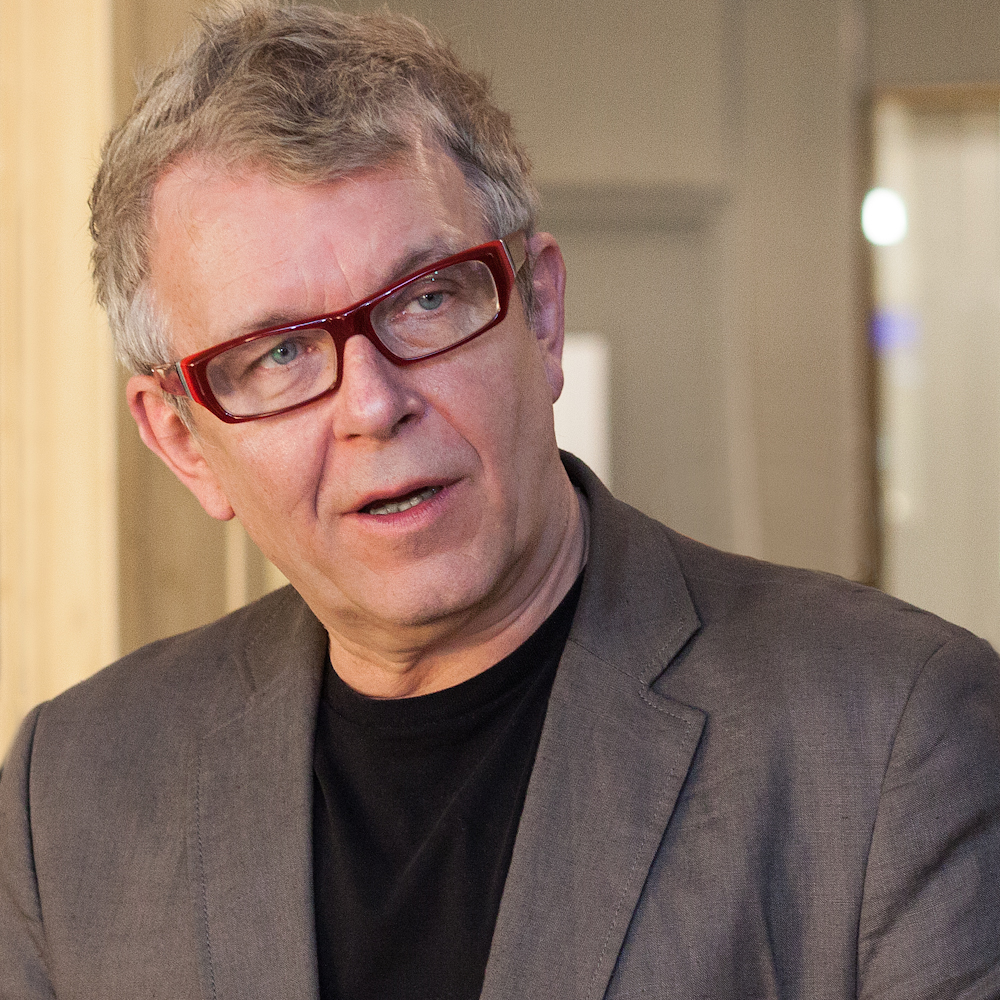
Zbigniew Rybczyński directed the video.

The song's music video was directed by Polish filmmaker Zbigniew Rybczyński. According to the editor of the video, Glenn Lazzaro:

Zbig had shot footage of country landscapes for Rush. The idea was to shoot short pieces of Rush performing the song against green screen, then composite them together. When we started working, Zbig decided he loved the stage and wanted to composite Rush over that instead. I suggested that we shoot them live in the stage, but Zbig wanted everyone to "float" around it. He also insisted that everything had to happen "live." Each new layer would be placed on top of the preceding layer without making protection copies or “laying off” a copy, as we used to say. The green screen footage was shot with the same giant studio camera Aimee Mann is using in the video. Zbig would give some vague direction to Rush; I would set up the effects, play the audio track and press record, causing multiple one-inch tape machines to roll up on the third floor.

Aimee Mann appears with the band in the video, which was filmed over the course of an entire day.

== Personnel ==
Rush

- Geddy Lee - vocals, bass guitar, synthesizers
- Alex Lifeson - guitar
- Neil Peart - Drums

Additional Musicians

- Aimee Mann - vocals

== Charts ==
Chart (1987)	Peak position
UK Singles (Official Charts)	42
US Hot Mainstream Rock Tracks (Billboard)	3
Canada Top Singles Chart (RPM)	52

== See also ==
- Rush: Time Stand Still, a documentary film about the band's 2015 R40 Live Tour
- List of songs recorded by Rush
