= Lock and Key (Rush song) =

Promotional single by Rush

from the album Hold Your Fire
- Released: December 1987
- Recorded: 1987
- Genre: Rock
- Length: 5:10
- Label: Anthem Records
- Songwriters: Geddy Lee, Alex Lifeson, Neil Peart
- Producer: Peter Collins

Music video
- "Lock and Key" on YouTube

"Lock and Key" is a song written and performed by Canadian rock band Rush. It is a promotional single from their twelfth studio album, Hold Your Fire. The song deals with the theme of every human being’s primal, violent instincts underneath their civil appearance - their “killer instinct”. Critics gave the song liking reviews, with some saying it had quality of a hit single, and would make it on the Billboard Hot Mainstream Rock Tracks chart; it went on to reach number 16 on the chart. The song's music video was originally released in 1987, and was produced by Bob Jason and directed by T. Vanden Ende. The song was only played live by the band on the Hold Your Fire Tour.

== Composition and background ==
"Lock and Key"
The song's chorus and second verse.

=== Music ===
"Lock and Key" is composed in a G♯ minor key, and played at a moderate tempo and in common time. The intro follows the chord progression G♯m—F♯/A♯—B6—C♯7—G♯m—F♯/A♯—E—G♯m—F♯ (no. 2)/A♯—B (no. 2), the versus following G♯m—F♯/A♯—B, the pre-chorus following D#5—E♯5—F♯5—G♯5—A♯5—F♯5, the chorus following G♯m—F♯/A♯—B6—C♯—C#sus—G♯m—F♯/A♯—E5, and the bridge following G♯5—A♯5—B5.

Geddy Lee said the song to have been a mix of sounds and ideas. Lee played both keyboards and bass in the song, which he found to be a "battle". He also said in 1988 that, unlike most songs from Hold Your Fire, he played a 5-string bass for the song (the only song in their discography where he did so): "I find that low string really means more today, because we're living in the world of synthesizers that go lower than basses ever went before." Drummer Neil Peart said that in the song, he performed "a solo while Geddy and Alex keep time behind me. That's fantastic, a beautiful exchange of roles: a drum solo in the terms of a guitar solo, where the rest of the band supports, Geddy and Alex playing the actual rhythmic pulse. It allows us to try out a new suit, to take on a new interrelationship between us."

=== Lyrics ===
"I don't want to face the killer instinct
Face it in you or me
So we keep it under lock and key
Lock and key"

— The song's chorus, describing how a "killer instinct" is kept under control.

"Lock and Key" alludes to the Carson McCullers novel The Heart is a Lonely Hunter. The subject of the song is about violence, making mentions of threats about a "killer instinct" inherent in humanity. Alex Lifeson said that the phrase meant "the ability to kill for no reason at all," so, according to the book Mystic Rhythms: The Philosophical Vision of Rush, "we suppress and repress the living, vibrant, animal courage, and substitute the tepid, torpid, vapid, but secure robotic, mechanistic, automatic-pilot self. Risk is the price of being free, and we’d rather not pay it."

== Release ==
"Lock and Key" was only released as a promotional single by Anthem Records in Canada in 1987. It is the sixth track of the album Hold Your Fire. Rush performed the song live on their Hold Your Fire tour, and a live performance of the song appears on the laserdisc version of the concert film A Show of Hands. The song was also listed as a track on the official flyer for the live box set Rush Replay X 3, but Anthem claimed it was an error and said it would not appear on the box set.

== Reception ==
The song has been given positive reviews from music critics. Allmusic called the song "quintessential Rush". Scouting magazine said the song had "genuine hit-single potential." Metal Storm said that the song was a standout track of Hold Your Fire, stating that it "has a clear-cut power edge over the rest of the album." The Manila Standard also named it one of the best cuts from the album. In contrast, The Cavalier Daily found the song to be forgettable. The song peaked at number 16 on the Billboard Hot Mainstream Rock Tracks chart.

== Music video ==
Geddy Lee and Alex Lifeson as seen in the video

The song's music video was originally released in 1987. It was produced by Bob Jason and directed by T. Vanden Ende. The video was later released on iTunes on December 7, 2005. The video includes a reel of old and unusual footage in the background, such as clips from the 1932 film The Last Mile. Lee said that the goal of making the video was to make the footage match with the lyrics, which was very difficult to do, because "we [the band] were all trying to do those effects on camera."

== In other media ==
"Lock and Key" was played on the episode "The Whole Truth" from the Canadian television show Degrassi Junior High.

"Intro", from Joe Budden's self-titled debut album, is credited on the album's liner notes as sampling "Lock and Key".

== Chart positions ==
Chart	Peak position
US Mainstream Rock Tracks (Billboard)	16
