= Tom Sawyer (song) =

1981 song by Rush

Single by Rush

from the album Moving Pictures
- B-side: "Witch Hunt"
- Released: May 1981
- Recorded: October–November 1980
- Studio: Le Studio, Morin-Heights, Quebec
- Genre: Progressive rock; hard rock
- Length: 4:36
- Label: Mercury
- Songwriters: Rush; Pye Dubois
- Producers: Rush; Terry Brown

Rush singles chronology
"Limelight" (1981)	"Tom Sawyer" (1981)	"Closer to the Heart (Live)" (1981)
"Vital Signs" (1981)	"Tom Sawyer (Live)" (1981)	"Closer to the Heart (Live)" (1981)

Audio sample
- "Tom Sawyer" from Moving Pictures.: file; help

Music video
- "Tom Sawyer" on YouTube

"Tom Sawyer" is a song by Canadian rock band Rush, originally released on their 1981 album Moving Pictures as its opener. The band's lead singer, bassist, and keyboardist, Geddy Lee, has referred to the track as the band's "defining piece ... from the early '80s".

Drumeo has stated Tom Sawyer may be "the world's greatest air-drumming song of all-time". Rolling Stone listed the song at number 1 on their list "The 10 Best Rush Songs"., as did Ultimate Classic Rock on its ranking of "All 167 Rush Songs Ranked Worst to Best".

== Background and recording ==
The song was written by Geddy Lee, drummer Neil Peart, and guitarist Alex Lifeson in collaboration with lyricist Pye Dubois of the band Max Webster, who also co-wrote the Rush songs "Force Ten", "Between Sun and Moon", and "Test for Echo". According to the US radio show In the Studio with Redbeard (which devoted an episode to the making of Moving Pictures), "Tom Sawyer" came about during a summer rehearsal vacation that Rush spent at Ronnie Hawkins' farm outside Toronto. Peart was presented with a poem by Dubois named "Louis the Warrior" (pictured in Geddy Lee’s Autobiography, "My Effin’ Life") that he modified and expanded. Lee and Lifeson then helped set the poem to music. For "Tom Sawyer", Lee switched from his Rickenbacker 4001 to a Fender Jazz Bass he purchased from a pawn shop.

In the December 1985 Rush Backstage Club newsletter, drummer and lyricist Neil Peart said:

Tom Sawyer was a collaboration between myself and Pye Dubois, an excellent lyricist who wrote the lyrics for Max Webster. His original lyrics were kind of a portrait of a modern day rebel, a free-spirited individualist striding through the world wide-eyed and purposeful. I added the themes of reconciling the boy and man in myself, and the difference between what people are and what others perceive them to be—namely me, I guess.

Alex Lifeson describes his guitar solo in "Tom Sawyer" in a 2007 interview:

I winged it. Honest! I came in, did five takes, then went off and had a cigarette. I'm at my best for the first two takes; after that, I overthink everything and I lose the spark. Actually, the solo you hear is composed together from various takes.

Record World described the song as a "Zeppelinesque power ballad" which "breaks into a dynamic, demonic jam."

== Personnel ==
- Geddy Lee – vocals, bass, keyboards
- Alex Lifeson – guitar
- Neil Peart – drums

== Single release ==
The song peaked at number 24 in Canada, number 44 on the US Billboard Hot 100, and number eight on the Billboard Top Tracks chart. The studio version of "Tom Sawyer", despite its popularity, did not see a single-release in other territories. In the UK, "Vital Signs" was chosen as the single from Moving Pictures. "Tom Sawyer" is one of the most played songs on classic rock radio in the United States, is the most played Canadian song from before 1988 by Canadian rock radio stations during the Neilson BDS Era (which started in 1995), and is the fifth most downloaded Canadian digital song from the 1980s. In 2009, it placed 19th on VH1's list of 100 Greatest Songs of Hard Rock. "Tom Sawyer" was one of five Rush songs inducted into the Canadian Songwriters Hall of Fame on March 28, 2010.

The live version of "Tom Sawyer" from Exit...Stage Left peaked at number 25 on the UK Singles Chart in November 1981.

== Charts ==
=== Weekly charts ===
Chart (1981)	Peak position
Canada Top Singles (RPM)	24
UK Singles (Official Charts)	25
US Billboard Hot 100	44
US Mainstream Rock Airplay (Billboard)	8

== Certifications ==
Region	Certification	Certified units/sales
United Kingdom (BPI)	Silver	200,000^{‡}
^{‡} Sales+streaming figures based on certification alone.

== See also ==
- List of songs recorded by Rush
- The Adventures of Tom Sawyer, the book that is referenced in the song
