= Force Ten (song) =

1987 single by Rush

Promotional single by Rush

from the album Hold Your Fire
- Released: September 1987
- Recorded: 1987
- Genre: Rock; new wave
- Length: 4:33
- Label: Mercury
- Songwriters: Geddy Lee; Alex Lifeson; Neil Peart; Pye Dubois
- Producers: Peter Collins; Rush

"Force Ten" is a song written, produced and performed by Canadian rock band Rush, released as a promotional single from their album Hold Your Fire. It was the last song written for the album. The song has been both critically and positively received, and peaked at number 3 on the Billboard Mainstream Rock Tracks chart.

== Writing and composition ==
According to Peart, the song describes the "storms of life," using storm level in the Beaufort wind scale as an analogy. Peart, a self-described "weather fanatic", makes references to "the eye of the storm" and circling hurricanes in the lyrics. He also "express[es] appreciation" for the disproportionally small number of female fans at Rush shows "singing along, or air-drumming, or even dancing" in the lyric "cool and remote like dancing girls".

"Force Ten" was written in three hours on December 14, 1986, the last day of pre-production for Hold Your Fire. With nine songs already written, producer Peter Collins felt it was important to have one more song for the album. Pye Dubois, who previously worked with Rush on their song "Tom Sawyer", had sent Neil Peart some lyrics for the song, and Peart would add more verses to it.

Musically, "Force Ten" is composed in A minor, with changes into A major scale occurring in the song. The song is set in common time at a fast rock tempo. Peart has said that Geddy Lee and Alex Lifeson were "trying to explore some musical areas that we hadn't covered yet," when writing the music for the song. Lee performed bass chords in the song, inspired to do so by his friend Jeff Berlin. The song was described by The Cavalier Daily as "intense".

== Release and reception ==
"Force Ten" was released in the United States by Mercury Records as a 12" vinyl one-track promotional single in 1987. It is the opening track of Rush's studio album Hold Your Fire, and the song later appear on compilation albums such as Chronicles, Retrospective II, The Spirit of Radio: Greatest Hits 1974-1987, Gold, Icon, and Sector 3. The song received a favorable critical reception, with Allmusic calling it "the band's [Rush] most immediate number in years," rating the song an AMG pick track. The song would make it on the Billboard Hot Mainstream Rock Tracks, peaking #3.

== Live performance ==
Force Ten was a staple of Rush’s live performances, and was played from the Hold Your Fire Tour until the Counterparts Tour, as well as the R30 and Clockwork Angels tours

== Charts ==
| Chart | Peak position |
|---|---|
| US Mainstream Rock Tracks (Billboard) | 3 |
