= Closer to the Heart =

Single by Rush

from the album A Farewell to Kings
- B-side: "Madrigal"
- Released: October 1977 (US); January 27, 1978 (UK)
- Recorded: June 23, 1977
- Studio: Rockfield Studios, South Wales, UK
- Genre: Progressive rock
- Length: 2:53
- Label: Mercury
- Composers: Alex Lifeson; Geddy Lee
- Lyricists: Neil Peart; Peter Talbot
- Producers: Rush; Terry Brown

Rush singles chronology
"Making Memories" (1977)	"Closer to the Heart" (1977)	"Cinderella Man" (1977)

Music video
- "Closer to the Heart" on YouTube

"Closer to the Heart" is a song by Canadian rock band Rush. It was released in October 1977 as the lead single from their fifth studio album A Farewell to Kings. It was the first Rush song to feature a non-member as a songwriter in Peter Talbot, a friend of drummer and lyricist Neil Peart. It was Rush's first hit single in the United Kingdom, reaching number 36 in the UK Singles Chart in February 1978. It also peaked at number 45 in Canada and number 76 on the US Billboard Hot 100. It was inducted into the Canadian Songwriters Hall of Fame on March 28, 2010.

Cash Box called it a "strong song" and said that it is "very like a Led Zeppelin number in terms of structure, timbres, and the role of the lead vocalist." Record World called it a "stately rocker with a strong vocal."

A live version of the song was released as a single in 1981 as the lead single from their live album, Exit...Stage Left; this version peaked at number 69 on the US Billboard Hot 100.

== Background ==
The band's frontman, Geddy Lee, said of the song:

I remember when we had to bring it back into the set for the Rio shows, as there was such a demand to hear it and we'd stopped playing it for a while. It's always resonated with people for some reason, and it was a hit as far as we've ever had a hit. It got us on the radio, the kinds of radio that would never normally associate with us, so it was as close as we ever came to a pop song, especially at that point. Over here in the UK it had that effect, and in the US too.

== Performances ==
The song was played live by the band on every tour since its release, up until the Presto Tour, when it was dropped. It was then put back in the setlist for the next three tours (as well as some dates during the Vapor Trails Tour), and then dropped for the next two tours. It was then put back in for the Time Machine Tour, and dropped from the following Clockwork Angels Tour. It was then brought back for the R40 Tour.

The live albums A Show of Hands, Different Stages, and Grace Under Pressure Tour feature extended instrumental sections after the last verse. On the 1981 live album Exit...Stage Left, the song segues into "Beneath, Between and Behind"; further, on Time Machine 2011: Live in Cleveland, it shifts into a triplet feel for the last verse. On the DVD release of the latter album, a polka rendition of the song is played during the end credits.

Although the original recording and most live performances feature acoustic drums, Peart used an electronic drum kit to play the song in concerts from 1984 to 1994.

In 2005, Rush performed the song with Mike Smith (in character as Bubbles from Trailer Park Boys) and Ed Robertson of Barenaked Ladies as part of a CBC telethon for the Canadian Tsunami Disaster Fund. This performance is included on the R30: 30th Anniversary World Tour DVD. In 2022, Lee and Lifeson joined members of Primus and South Park co-creator Matt Stone to perform "Closer to the Heart" for the South Park 25th Anniversary Concert at Red Rocks Amphitheatre.

== Track listing UK version ==
=== A Side ===
1. "Closer to the Heart" – 2:53 (Lee/Lifeson/Peart/Talbot)

=== B side ===
1. "Bastille Day" – 4:37 (Lee/Lifeson/Peart)
2. "Anthem" – 4:10 (Lee/Lifeson/Peart) [only on 12"]
3. "The Temples of Syrinx" – 2:13 (Lee/Lifeson/Peart)

== Charts ==
Weekly chart performance for "Closer to the Heart"
Chart (1977–78, 1981–82, 2017–18)	Peak position
Canada Top Singles (RPM)	44
Canada (CHUM)	13
UK Singles (OCC)	36
UK Physical Singles (OCC) 2017 re-release	15
UK Vinyl Singles (OCC) 2017 re-release	10
US Billboard Hot 100	76
US Billboard Hot 100 Live version	69
US Mainstream Rock Airplay (Billboard) Live version	21

== See also ==
- List of Rush songs
