= Power Windows Tour =

1985–1986 concert tour by Rush

- Tour by Rush
- Poster to the concert in Atlanta, USA
- Location: North America
- Associated album: Power Windows
- Start date: December 4, 1985
- End date: May 26, 1986
- Legs: 2
- No. of shows: 70

Rush concert chronology
- Grace Under Pressure Tour (1984); Power Windows Tour (1985–1986); Hold Your Fire Tour (1987–1988)

The Power Windows Tour was a concert tour by Canadian rock band Rush, in support of the band's eleventh studio album Power Windows.

== Background ==
Prior to the tour's start, the band embarked on a short warm-up tour of four shows in Florida which the band called the "Spring Training" tour. The tour officially started on December 4, 1985, at the Cumberland County Civic Center in Portland, Maine, and concluded on May 26, 1986, at the Pacific Amphitheatre in Costa Mesa, California. Select songs at the two East Rutherford, New Jersey, shows were recorded for the 1989 live album A Show of Hands. Opening bands on the tour included Steve Morse, Marillion, FM, Blue Öyster Cult, The Fabulous Thunderbirds and Kick Axe.

== Reception ==
Ethlie Ann Vare from Billboard opened their review of the band's performance in Inglewood, noting the band as an anomaly in arena rock, stating that the band drew the same crowd as Van Halen or Mötley Crüe and delivered a jazz-based, laid-back sophisticated performance, yet continued to excite the sold out audience of fans attending the show. The only criticisms that were given was Geddy Lee's vocals which were considered "cruel and unusual punishment to some", as well as stating the band can be boring. However Ann Vare stated that it was refreshing to see a band in the heavy rock genre that satisfies its fans without pandering to them.

Greg Barr from the Ottawa Citizen gave the Ottawa performance he attended a positive review. He opened his review, stating that the band had reached a pinnacle of technical and musical prowess, being compared to familiar acts like Van Halen and Bruce Springsteen. He praised the visuals and music, noting on the show as well-paced and choreographed, noting on the inclusion of lasers, a laser-holograph generator, a 35mm rear screen movie projector and a group of masked native dancers on the film screen behind the band. Regarding the effects and visuals, Barr stated that it would have the audience talking about it for some time. He praised Peart's drum solo which has praised as "spell-binding", noting on him using two different drum sets that swiveled around like gun-turrets on the deck of a battleship.

== Set list ==
These are example set lists adapted from Rush: Wandering the Face of the Earth – The Official Touring History of what were performed during the tour, but may not represent the majority of the shows.

Warm Up leg

1. "The Spirit of Radio"
2. "Subdivisions"
3. "The Body Electric"
4. "The Enemy Within"
5. "The Weapon"
6. "Witch Hunt"
7. "The Big Money"
8. "New World Man"
9. "Between the Wheels"
10. "Red Barchetta"
11. "Distant Early Warning"
12. "Red Sector A"
13. "Closer to the Heart"
14. "Middletown Dreams"
15. "YYZ"
16. "2112 Part II: The Temples of Syrinx"
17. "Tom Sawyer"
  Encore
18. "Red Lenses" (with drum solo)
19. "Vital Signs"
20. "Finding My Way"
21. "In the Mood"

North American leg

1. "The Spirit of Radio"
2. "Limelight"
3. "The Big Money"
4. "New World Man"
5. "Subdivisions"
6. "Manhattan Project"
7. "Middletown Dreams"
8. "Witch Hunt"
9. "Red Sector A"
10. "Closer to the Heart"
11. "Marathon"
12. "The Trees"
13. "Mystic Rhythms"
14. "Distant Early Warning"
15. "Territories"
16. "YYZ" (with drum solo)
17. "Red Lenses"
18. "Tom Sawyer"
  Encore
19. "2112 Parts I & II: Overture/The Temples of Syrinx"
20. "Grand Designs"
21. "In the Mood"

== Tour dates ==
List of 1985 concerts
Date	City	Country	Venue	Attendance	Gross
March 11, 1985	Lakeland	United States	Lakeland Civic Center	16,875 / 20,000	$232,890
March 12, 1985	Lakeland	United States	Lakeland Civic Center	16,875 / 20,000	$232,890
March 14, 1985	Fort Myers	United States	Lee County Civic Center	4,375 / 4,500	$56,875
March 15, 1985	Pembroke Pines	United States	Hollywood Sportatorium	11,211 / 11,500	$144,885
December 4, 1985	Portland	United States	Cumberland County Civic Center	6,114 / 9,500	—N/a
December 5, 1985	Providence	United States	Providence Civic Center	10,792 / 10,792	$155,020
December 7, 1985	New Haven	United States	New Haven Coliseum	7,099 / 11,000	—N/a
December 8, 1985	Hartford	United States	Hartford Civic Center	10,595 / 16,500	—N/a
December 10, 1985	Rochester	United States	Rochester Community War Memorial	10,048 / 10,048	$135,176
December 12, 1985	Worcester	United States	Centrum in Worcester	21,050 / 21,050	$300,816
December 13, 1985	Worcester	United States	Centrum in Worcester	21,050 / 21,050	$300,816
December 15, 1985	Richmond	United States	Richmond Coliseum	7,829 / 11,000	—N/a
December 16, 1985	Landover	United States	Capital Centre	16,040 / 16,500	$232,580
December 18, 1985	Pittsburgh	United States	Pittsburgh Civic Arena	10,782 / 17,500	$148,353
December 19, 1985	Richfield	United States	Richfield Coliseum	14,880 / 18,000	—N/a

List of 1986 concerts
Date	City	Country	Venue	Attendance	Gross
January 9, 1986	Pensacola	United States	Pensacola Civic Center	5,426 / 7,000	$78,677
January 10, 1986	Lafayette	United States	Cajundome	8,151 / 12,000	—N/a
January 12, 1986	Dallas	United States	Reunion Arena	24,697 / 26,450	$371,182
January 13, 1986	Dallas	United States	Reunion Arena	24,697 / 26,450	$371,182
January 15, 1986	Houston	United States	The Summit	18,175 / 21,836	$284,382
January 16, 1986	Houston	United States	The Summit	18,175 / 21,836	$284,382
January 18, 1986	Austin	United States	Frank Erwin Center	13,671 / 13,671	$199,154
January 19, 1986	San Antonio	United States	Hemisfair Arena	9,397 / 10,500	$135,486
January 30, 1986	Daly City	United States	Cow Palace	11,034 / 11,034	$165,510
January 31, 1986	Oakland	United States	Oakland-Alameda County Coliseum Arena	13,711 / 13,711	$219,376
February 2, 1986	Las Vegas	United States	Thomas & Mack Center	4,340 / 6,650	$65,100
February 3, 1986	San Diego	United States	San Diego Sports Arena	10,817 / 10,817	$154,344
February 6, 1986	Inglewood	United States	The Forum	30,006 / 30,006	$425,309
February 7, 1986	Inglewood	United States	The Forum	30,006 / 30,006	$425,309
February 8, 1986	Phoenix	United States	Arizona Veterans Memorial Coliseum	13,755 / 13,755	$191,325
February 10, 1986	Tucson	United States	Tucson Community Center	5,002 / 8,600	—N/a
February 12, 1986	Albuquerque	United States	Tingley Coliseum	3,345 / 11,500	—N/a
February 14, 1986	Denver	United States	McNichols Sports Arena	11,474 / 18,590	$173,562
February 27, 1986	Buffalo	United States	Buffalo Memorial Auditorium	11,258 / 14,605	—N/a
February 28, 1986	Hamilton	Canada	Copps Coliseum	6,797 / 19,000	—N/a
March 1, 1986	Ottawa	Canada	Ottawa Civic Centre	7,421 / 8,000	$129,868
March 3, 1986	Quebec City	Canada	Colisee de Quebec	13,059 / 13,059	$228,532
March 4, 1986	Montreal	Canada	Montreal Forum	14,618 / 14,618	$283,481
March 6, 1986	Toronto	Canada	Maple Leaf Gardens	22,145 / 24,000	$431,827
March 7, 1986	Toronto	Canada	Maple Leaf Gardens	22,145 / 24,000	$431,827
March 20, 1986	Indianapolis	United States	Market Square Arena	10,100 / 11,500	$146,450
March 21, 1986	Rosemont	United States	Rosemont Horizon	26,447 / 26,982	—N/a
March 22, 1986	Rosemont	United States	Rosemont Horizon	26,447 / 26,982	—N/a
March 24, 1986	Milwaukee	United States	MECCA Arena	8,883 / 11,000	$127,615
March 25, 1986	St. Paul	United States	St. Paul Civic Center	8,917 / 15,406	$133,755
March 28, 1986	Detroit	United States	Joe Louis Arena	15,036 / 15,036	$232,230
March 29, 1986	Cincinnati	United States	Riverfront Coliseum	11,378 / 17,500	—N/a
March 31, 1986	East Rutherford	United States	Brendan Byrne Arena	30,949 / 42,000	$438,016
April 1, 1986	East Rutherford	United States	Brendan Byrne Arena	30,949 / 42,000	$438,016
April 3, 1986	Springfield	United States	Springfield Civic Center	8,460 / 9,000	—N/a
April 4, 1986	Uniondale	United States	Nassau Veterans Memorial Coliseum	15,531 / 15,531	$254,211
April 13, 1986	Binghamton	United States	Broome County Veterans Memorial Arena	7,061 / 8,000	$102,754
April 14, 1986	Philadelphia	United States	The Spectrum	30,386 / 30,386	$452,382
April 16, 1986	Philadelphia	United States	The Spectrum	30,386 / 30,386	$452,382
April 17, 1986	Baltimore	United States	Baltimore Civic Center	10,036 / 13,641	$145,522
April 19, 1986	Hampton	United States	Hampton Coliseum	11,466 / 11,500	—N/a
April 20, 1986	Charlotte	United States	Charlotte Coliseum	6,998 / 9,500	—N/a
April 22, 1986	Greensboro	United States	Greensboro Coliseum	6,918 / 10,000	—N/a
April 23, 1986	Augusta	United States	Augusta-Richmond County Civic Center	3,364 / 9,000	—N/a
April 25, 1986	Atlanta	United States	The Omni Coliseum	12,806 / 12,806	$192,090
April 26, 1986	Birmingham	United States	BJCC Coliseum	5,454 / 10,000	—N/a
April 28, 1986	St. Louis	United States	St. Louis Arena	11,369 / 11,369	$170,535
April 29, 1986	Kansas City	United States	Kemper Arena	11,236 / 12,000	$162,922
May 1, 1986	Oklahoma City	United States	Myriad Convention Center	7,719 / 11,000	—N/a
May 2, 1986	Valley Center	United States	Britt Brown Arena	6,537 / 10,000	—N/a
May 12, 1986	Salt Lake City	United States	Salt Palace	7,495 / 13,000	—N/a
May 15, 1986	Calgary	Canada	Olympic Saddledome	7,770 / 10,000	$134,914
May 17, 1986	Vancouver	Canada	Pacific Coliseum	8,354 / 9,000	$151,617
May 19, 1986	Portland	United States	Portland Memorial Coliseum	6,882 / 12,888	—N/a
May 21, 1986	Seattle	United States	Seattle Center Coliseum	10,640 / 17,500	—N/a
May 24, 1986	Sacramento	United States	Cal Expo Amphitheatre	12,200 / 12,200	$201,300
May 25, 1986	Costa Mesa	United States	Pacific Amphitheatre	21,533 / 32,000	—N/a
May 26, 1986	Costa Mesa	United States	Pacific Amphitheatre	21,533 / 32,000	—N/a

== Personnel ==
- Geddy Lee – vocals, bass, keyboards
- Alex Lifeson – guitar, backing vocals
- Neil Peart – drums
