= Fifty Something tour =

2026–2027 concert tour by Rush

Fifty Something
- Tour by Rush
- Promotional poster for the 2027 concerts
- Location: Europe; North America; South America
- Start date: June 7, 2026
- End date: April 10, 2027
- Legs: 3
- No. of shows: 91

Rush concert chronology
- R40 Live Tour (2015); Fifty Something (2026–2027); Elevate from the Norm (2027)

The Fifty Something tour is a concert tour by the Canadian rock band Rush. The tour began on June 7, 2026 at the Kia Forum in Inglewood, United States, and is currently set to conclude at the Veikkaus Arena in Helsinki, Finland, on April 10, 2027. It is Rush's first tour in 11 years, and their first live outing without drummer Neil Peart in 52 years, following his death in 2020, with Anika Nilles filling in for him. On February 23, 2026, Rush announced that Loren Gold would be the keyboardist for the tour, making it the first time the band has toured with more than three main musicians.

== Background ==
On October 6, 2025, Geddy Lee and Alex Lifeson announced that they were reforming Rush for a tour called Fifty Something which was scheduled from June to December 2026, with Anika Nilles on drums. Lee suggested that the tour would include up to two more musicians, including a backing keyboardist. Lee and Lifeson also stated that 35 songs would be performed on the tour, with the intention of varying their setlist at each show.

Lee said that he and Lifeson began thinking more seriously about a reunion tour after they travelled to a health spa in Austria. Two years prior, Lifeson had undergone a surgery that left him with gastroparesis. Lee said when they returned home, both felt willing and able to consider a small number of tour dates in limited North American cities. What started as 12 dates quickly grew into 58 shows with more cities added. When asked in an interview with The Globe and Mail if the tour would include dates outside of North America, Lee said, "We're wrestling with extending the tour into 2027. I really don't know. We'll see how that all shakes down." On February 23, 2026, Rush announced that the portion of the tour outside of North America would take place from January to April 2027, starting with their first live show in South America in seventeen years, followed by the band's first tour in Europe in fourteen years. Rush added former Chicago keyboardist Loren Gold as a touring musician in late February 2026; his arrival to the band marked the first time since second guitarist Mitch Bossi's departure from Rush in 1972 that they have performed together as a quartet rather than a trio.

Following the South American and European tour dates, Rush will play five shows (advertised as Elevate from the Norm) at the Sphere in Las Vegas in May 2027.

== Set lists ==
The set lists are developed from a collection of 38 songs, counting the two versions of 2112 as one song.

=== 2026 ===
Inglewood (June 7, 2026)

Set One

1. "Xanadu"
2. "Limelight"
3. "Far Cry"
4. "Subdivisions"
5. "Freewill"
6. "Bravado"
7. "Caravan"
8. "La Villa Strangiato"
9. "Vital Signs"
10. "The Spirit of Radio"

Set Two

1. "2112: Overture / The Temples of Syrinx / Grand Finale"
2. "Distant Early Warning"
3. "Red Barchetta"
4. "Dreamline"
5. "Natural Science"
6. "Time Stand Still"
7. "Red Sector A"
8. "YYZ"
9. "The Garden"
10. "Tom Sawyer"

Encore

1. "By-Tor and the Snow Dog"
2. "Working Man"
Inglewood (June 9, 2026)

Set One

1. "Xanadu"
2. "The Spirit of Radio"
3. "The Analog Kid"
4. "Freewill"
5. "Subdivisions"
6. "Bravado"
7. "Leave That Thing Alone"
8. "The Trees"
9. "Headlong Flight"
10. "Limelight"

Set Two

1. "2112: Overture / The Temples of Syrinx / Discovery / Presentation / Oracle: The Dream / Soliloquy / Grand Finale"
2. "Animate"
3. "Closer to the Heart"
4. "A Passage to Bangkok"
5. "Time Stand Still"
6. "YYZ"
7. "Anthem"
8. "Red Barchetta"
9. "Witch Hunt"
10. "Tom Sawyer"

Encore

1. "Finding My Way"
2. "Working Man"
Inglewood (June 11, 2026)

Set One

1. "Xanadu"
2. "Dreamline"
3. "Subdivisions"
4. "Headlong Flight"
5. "Bravado"
6. "Red Sector A"
7. "La Villa Strangiato"
8. "Anthem"
9. "New World Man"
10. "The Spirit of Radio"

Set Two

1. "Tom Sawyer"
2. "Red Barchetta"
3. "YYZ"
4. "Limelight"
5. "The Camera Eye"
6. "Witch Hunt"
7. "Vital Signs"
8. "Time Stand Still"
9. "Closer to the Heart"
10. "2112: Overture / The Temples of Syrinx / Grand Finale"

Encore

1. "By-Tor and the Snow Dog"
2. "Working Man"
Inglewood (June 13, 2026)

Set One

1. "Xanadu"
2. "Limelight"
3. "Subdivisions"
4. "The Pass"
5. "Freewill"
6. "Bravado"
7. "The Camera Eye"
8. "The Trees"
9. "The Anarchist"
10. "The Spirit of Radio"

Set Two

1. "2112: Overture / The Temples of Syrinx / Discovery / Presentation / Oracle: The Dream / Soliloquy / Grand Finale"
2. "Far Cry"
3. "Distant Early Warning"
4. "New World Man"
5. "Vital Signs"
6. "Time Stand Still"
7. "YYZ"
8. "A Farewell to Kings"
9. "The Garden"
10. "Tom Sawyer"

Encore

1. "Finding My Way"
2. "Working Man"
Mexico City (June 18, 2026)

Set One

1. "Xanadu"
2. "Dreamline"
3. "Subdivisions"
4. "Headlong Flight"
5. "Bravado"
6. "Red Sector A"
7. "La Villa Strangiato"
8. "Anthem"
9. "New World Man"
10. "The Spirit of Radio"

Set Two

1. "Tom Sawyer"
2. "Red Barchetta"
3. "YYZ"
4. "Limelight"
5. "The Camera Eye"
6. "Witch Hunt"
7. "Vital Signs"
8. "Time Stand Still"
9. "Closer to the Heart"
10. "2112: Overture / The Temples of Syrinx / Grand Finale"

Encore

1. "Finding My Way"
2. "Working Man"
Mexico City (June 20, 2026)

Set One

1. "Xanadu"
2. "The Spirit of Radio"
3. "The Analog Kid"
4. "Freewill"
5. "Subdivisions"
6. "Bravado"
7. "Leave That Thing Alone"
8. "The Trees"
9. "The Anarchist"
10. "Limelight"

Set Two

1. "2112: Overture / The Temples of Syrinx / Discovery / Presentation / Oracle: The Dream / Soliloquy / Grand Finale"
2. "Animate"
3. "Closer to the Heart"
4. "A Passage to Bangkok"
5. "Time Stand Still"
6. "YYZ"
7. "Distant Early Warning"
8. "Red Barchetta"
9. "Witch Hunt"
10. "Tom Sawyer"

Encore

1. "Finding My Way"
2. "Working Man"
Fort Worth (June 26, 2026)

Set One

1. "Xanadu"
2. "Limelight"
3. "Far Cry"
4. "Subdivisions"
5. "Freewill"
6. "Bravado"
7. "Caravan"
8. "La Villa Strangiato"
9. "Vital Signs"
10. "The Spirit of Radio"

Set Two

1. "2112: Overture / The Temples of Syrinx / Grand Finale"
2. "Distant Early Warning"
3. "Red Barchetta"
4. "Dreamline"
5. "Natural Science"
6. "Time Stand Still"
7. "Red Sector A"
8. "YYZ"
9. "The Garden"
10. "Tom Sawyer"

Encore

1. "By-Tor and the Snow Dog"
2. "Working Man"
Fort Worth (June 28, 2026)

Set One

1. "Xanadu"
2. "The Spirit of Radio"
3. "The Analog Kid"
4. "Freewill"
5. "Subdivisions"
6. "Bravado"
7. "Leave That Thing Alone"
8. "The Trees"
9. "Headlong Flight"
10. "Limelight"

Set Two

1. "2112: Overture / The Temples of Syrinx / Discovery / Presentation / Oracle: The Dream / Soliloquy / Grand Finale"
2. "Animate"
3. "Closer to the Heart"
4. "A Passage to Bangkok"
5. "Time Stand Still"
6. "YYZ"
7. "Anthem"
8. "Red Barchetta"
9. "Witch Hunt"
10. "Tom Sawyer"

Encore

1. "Finding My Way"
2. "Working Man"
Fort Worth (July 11, 2026)

Set One

1. "Xanadu"
2. "Dreamline"
3. "Subdivisions"
4. "Headlong Flight"
5. "Bravado"
6. "Red Sector A"
7. "La Villa Strangiato"
8. "Anthem"
9. "New World Man"
10. "The Spirit of Radio"

Set Two

1. "Tom Sawyer"
2. "Red Barchetta"
3. "YYZ"
4. "Limelight"
5. "The Camera Eye"
6. "Witch Hunt"
7. "Vital Signs"
8. "Time Stand Still"
9. "Closer to the Heart"
10. "2112: Overture / The Temples of Syrinx / Grand Finale"

Encore

1. "By-Tor and the Snow Dog"
2. "Working Man"
Fort Worth (July 13, 2026)

Set One

1. "Xanadu"
2. "Far Cry"
3. "Subdivisions"
4. "The Pass"
5. "Freewill"
6. "Bravado"
7. "La Villa Strangiato"
8. "The Trees"
9. "The Anarchist"
10. "The Spirit of Radio"

Set Two

1. "2112: Overture / The Temples of Syrinx / Discovery / Presentation / Oracle: The Dream / Soliloquy / Grand Finale"
2. "Time Stand Still"
3. "YYZ"
4. "Red Barchetta"
5. "Limelight"
6. "The Camera Eye"
7. "Witch Hunt"
8. "Vital Signs"
9. "Tom Sawyer"

Encore

1. "Finding My Way"
2. "Working Man"
Chicago (July 16, 2026)

Set One

1. "Xanadu"
2. "Limelight"
3. "Far Cry"
4. "Subdivisions"
5. "Freewill"
6. "Bravado"
7. "Caravan"
8. "La Villa Strangiato"
9. "Vital Signs"
10. "The Spirit of Radio"

Set Two

1. "2112: Overture / The Temples of Syrinx / Grand Finale"
2. "Distant Early Warning"
3. "Red Barchetta"
4. "Dreamline"
5. "Natural Science"
6. "Time Stand Still"
7. "Red Sector A"
8. "YYZ"
9. "The Garden"
10. "Tom Sawyer"

Encore

1. "By-Tor and the Snow Dog"
2. "Working Man"
Chicago (July 18, 2026)

Set One

1. "Xanadu"
2. "The Spirit of Radio"
3. "The Analog Kid"
4. "Freewill"
5. "Subdivisions"
6. "Bravado"
7. "Leave That Thing Alone"
8. "The Trees"
9. "Headlong Flight"
10. "Limelight"

Set Two

1. "2112: Overture / The Temples of Syrinx / Discovery / Presentation / Oracle: The Dream / Soliloquy / Grand Finale"
2. "Animate"
3. "Closer to the Heart"
4. "A Passage to Bangkok"
5. "Time Stand Still"
6. "YYZ"
7. "Anthem"
8. "Red Barchetta"
9. "Witch Hunt"
10. "Tom Sawyer"

Encore

1. "Finding My Way"
2. "Working Man"
Chicago (July 20, 2026)

Set One

1. "Xanadu"
2. "Dreamline"
3. "Subdivisions"
4. "Headlong Flight"
5. "Bravado"
6. "Red Sector A"
7. "La Villa Strangiato"
8. "Anthem"
9. "New World Man"
10. "The Spirit of Radio"

Set Two

1. "Tom Sawyer"
2. "Red Barchetta"
3. "YYZ"
4. "Limelight"
5. "The Camera Eye"
6. "Witch Hunt"
7. "Vital Signs"
8. "Time Stand Still"
9. "Closer to the Heart"
10. "2112: Overture / The Temples of Syrinx / Grand Finale"

Encore

1. "By-Tor and the Snow Dog"
2. "Working Man"
Chicago (July 22, 2026)

Set One

1. "Xanadu"
2. "Limelight"
3. "Subdivisions"
4. "The Pass"
5. "Freewill"
6. "Bravado"
7. "The Camera Eye"
8. "The Trees"
9. "The Anarchist"
10. "The Spirit of Radio"

Set Two

1. "2112: Overture / The Temples of Syrinx / Discovery / Presentation / Oracle: The Dream / Soliloquy / Grand Finale"
2. "Far Cry"
3. "Distant Early Warning"
4. "New World Man"
5. "Vital Signs"
6. "Time Stand Still"
7. "YYZ"
8. "A Farewell to Kings"
9. "The Garden"
10. "Tom Sawyer"

Encore

1. "Finding My Way"
2. "Working Man"
New York City (July 28, 2026)

Set One

1. "Xanadu"
2. "Limelight"
3. "Far Cry"
4. "Subdivisions"
5. "Freewill"
6. "Bravado"
7. "Headlong Flight"
8. "La Villa Strangiato"
9. "Vital Signs"
10. "The Spirit of Radio"

Set Two

1. "2112: Overture / The Temples of Syrinx / Grand Finale"
2. "Distant Early Warning"
3. "Red Barchetta"
4. "Dreamline"
5. "Natural Science"
6. "Time Stand Still"
7. "Red Sector A"
8. "YYZ"
9. "The Garden"
10. "Tom Sawyer"

Encore

1. "By-Tor and the Snow Dog"
2. "Working Man"
New York City (July 30, 2026)

Set One

1. "Xanadu"
2. "The Spirit of Radio"
3. "The Analog Kid"
4. "Freewill"
5. "Subdivisions"
6. "Bravado"
7. "Leave That Thing Alone"
8. "The Trees"
9. "Caravan"
10. "Limelight"

Set Two

1. "2112: Overture / The Temples of Syrinx / Discovery / Presentation / Oracle: The Dream / Soliloquy / Grand Finale"
2. "Animate"
3. "Closer to the Heart"
4. "A Passage to Bangkok"
5. "Time Stand Still"
6. "YYZ"
7. "Anthem"
8. "Red Barchetta"
9. "Witch Hunt"
10. "Tom Sawyer"

Encore

1. "Finding My Way"
2. "Working Man"
New York City (August 1, 2026)

Set One

1. "Xanadu"
2. "Dreamline"
3. "Subdivisions"
4. "Headlong Flight"
5. "Bravado"
6. "Red Sector A"
7. "La Villa Strangiato"
8. "Anthem"
9. "New World Man"
10. "The Spirit of Radio"

Set Two

1. "Tom Sawyer"
2. "Red Barchetta"
3. "YYZ"
4. "Limelight"
5. "The Camera Eye"
6. "Witch Hunt"
7. "Vital Signs"
8. "Time Stand Still"
9. "Closer to the Heart"
10. "2112: Overture / The Temples of Syrinx / Grand Finale"

Encore

1. "By-Tor and the Snow Dog"
2. "Working Man"
New York City (August 3, 2026)

Set One

1. "Xanadu"
2. "Limelight"
3. "Subdivisions"
4. "The Pass"
5. "Freewill"
6. "Bravado"
7. "The Camera Eye"
8. "The Trees"
9. "The Anarchist"
10. "The Spirit of Radio"

Set Two

1. "2112: Overture / The Temples of Syrinx / Discovery / Presentation / Oracle: The Dream / Soliloquy / Grand Finale"
2. "Far Cry"
3. "New World Man"
4. "A Farewell to Kings"
5. "Time Stand Still"
6. "Vital Signs"
7. "YYZ"
8. "The Garden"
9. "Tom Sawyer"

Encore

1. "Finding My Way"
2. "Working Man"
Toronto (August 7, 2026)

Set One

1. "Xanadu"
2. "Limelight"
3. "Far Cry"
4. "Subdivisions"
5. "Freewill"
6. "Bravado"
7. "Headlong Flight"
8. "La Villa Strangiato"
9. "Vital Signs"
10. "The Spirit of Radio"

Set Two

1. "2112: Overture / The Temples of Syrinx / Grand Finale"
2. "Distant Early Warning"
3. "Red Barchetta"
4. "Dreamline"
5. "Natural Science"
6. "Time Stand Still"
7. "Red Sector A"
8. "YYZ"
9. "The Garden"
10. "Tom Sawyer"

Encore

1. "By-Tor and the Snow Dog"
2. "Working Man"
Toronto (August 9, 2026)

Set One

1. "Xanadu"
2. "The Spirit of Radio"
3. "The Analog Kid"
4. "Freewill"
5. "Subdivisions"
6. "Bravado"
7. "Leave That Thing Alone"
8. "The Trees"
9. "Caravan"
10. "Limelight"

Set Two

1. "2112: Overture / The Temples of Syrinx / Discovery / Presentation / Oracle: The Dream / Soliloquy / Grand Finale"
2. "Animate"
3. "Closer to the Heart"
4. "A Passage to Bangkok"
5. "Time Stand Still"
6. "YYZ"
7. "Anthem"
8. "Red Barchetta"
9. "Witch Hunt"
10. "Tom Sawyer"

Encore

1. "Finding My Way"
2. "Working Man"
Toronto (August 11, 2026)

Set One

1. "Xanadu"
2. "Dreamline"
3. "Subdivisions"
4. "Headlong Flight"
5. "Bravado"
6. "Red Sector A"
7. "La Villa Strangiato"
8. "Anthem"
9. "New World Man"
10. "The Spirit of Radio"

Set Two

1. "Tom Sawyer"
2. "Red Barchetta"
3. "YYZ"
4. "Limelight"
5. "The Camera Eye"
6. "Witch Hunt"
7. "Vital Signs"
8. "Time Stand Still"
9. "Closer to the Heart"
10. "2112: Overture / The Temples of Syrinx / Grand Finale"

Encore

1. "By-Tor and the Snow Dog"
2. "Working Man"
Toronto (August 13, 2026)

Set One

1. "Xanadu"
2. "Limelight"
3. "Subdivisions"
4. "The Pass"
5. "Freewill"
6. "Bravado"
7. "The Camera Eye"
8. "The Trees"
9. "The Anarchist"
10. "The Spirit of Radio"

Set Two

1. "2112: Overture / The Temples of Syrinx / Discovery / Presentation / Oracle: The Dream / Soliloquy / Grand Finale"
2. "Far Cry"
3. "New World Man"
4. "A Farewell to Kings"
5. "Time Stand Still"
6. "Vital Signs"
7. "YYZ"
8. "The Garden"
9. "Tom Sawyer"

Encore

1. "By-Tor and the Snow Dog"
2. "Working Man"
Philadelphia (August 21, 2026)

Set One

1. "Xanadu"
2. "The Spirit of Radio"
3. "The Analog Kid"
4. "Freewill"
5. "Subdivisions"
6. "Bravado"
7. "Caravan"
8. "La Villa Strangiato"
9. "The Trees"
10. "Limelight"

Set Two

1. "2112: Overture / The Temples of Syrinx / Discovery / Presentation / Oracle: The Dream / Soliloquy / Grand Finale"
2. "Animate"
3. "Closer to the Heart"
4. "A Passage to Bangkok"
5. "Time Stand Still"
6. "YYZ"
7. "Anthem"
8. "Red Barchetta"
9. "The Garden"
10. "Tom Sawyer"

Encore

1. "Finding My Way"
2. "Working Man"
Philadelphia (August 23, 2026)

Set One

1. "Xanadu"
2. "Dreamline"
3. "Subdivisions"
4. "Headlong Flight"
5. "Bravado"
6. "Red Sector A"
7. "La Villa Strangiato"
8. "A Farewell to Kings"
9. "New World Man"
10. "The Spirit of Radio"

Set Two

1. "Tom Sawyer"
2. "Red Barchetta"
3. "YYZ"
4. "Limelight"
5. "The Camera Eye"
6. "Witch Hunt"
7. "Vital Signs"
8. "Time Stand Still"
9. "Closer to the Heart"
10. "2112: Overture / The Temples of Syrinx / Grand Finale"

Encore

1. "By-Tor and the Snow Dog"
2. "Working Man"
Detroit (August 26, 2026)

Set One

1. "Xanadu"
2. "The Spirit of Radio"
3. "The Analog Kid"
4. "Freewill"
5. "Subdivisions"
6. "Bravado"
7. "Caravan"
8. "La Villa Strangiato"
9. "Natural Science"
10. "Limelight"

Set Two

1. "2112: Overture / The Temples of Syrinx / Discovery / Presentation / Oracle: The Dream / Soliloquy / Grand Finale"
2. "Animate"
3. "Closer to the Heart"
4. "A Passage to Bangkok"
5. "Time Stand Still"
6. "YYZ"
7. "Anthem"
8. "Red Barchetta"
9. "The Garden"
10. "Tom Sawyer"

Encore

1. "Finding My Way"
2. "Working Man"
Detroit (August 28, 2026)

Set One

1. "Xanadu"
2. "Dreamline"
3. "Subdivisions"
4. "Headlong Flight"
5. "Bravado"
6. "Red Sector A"
7. "La Villa Strangiato"
8. "A Farewell to Kings"
9. "New World Man"
10. "The Spirit of Radio"

Set Two

1. "Tom Sawyer"
2. "Red Barchetta"
3. "YYZ"
4. "Limelight"
5. "The Camera Eye"
6. "Witch Hunt"
7. "Vital Signs"
8. "Time Stand Still"
9. "Closer to the Heart"
10. "2112: Overture / The Temples of Syrinx / Grand Finale"

Encore

1. "By-Tor and the Snow Dog"
2. "Working Man"
Montreal (September 2, 2026)

Set One

1. "Xanadu"
2. "The Spirit of Radio"
3. "Distant Early Warning"
4. "Freewill"
5. "Subdivisions"
6. "Bravado"
7. "La Villa Strangiato"
8. "Natural Science"
9. "Limelight"

Set Two

1. "2112: Overture / The Temples of Syrinx / Discovery / Presentation / Oracle: The Dream / Soliloquy / Grand Finale"
2. "Animate"
3. "Closer to the Heart"
4. "A Passage to Bangkok"
5. "Time Stand Still"
6. "YYZ"
7. "Anthem"
8. "Red Barchetta"
9. "The Garden"
10. "Tom Sawyer"

Encore

1. "By-Tor and the Snow Dog"
2. "Working Man"
Montreal (September 4, 2026)

Set One

1. "Xanadu"
2. "Dreamline"
3. "Subdivisions"
4. "Headlong Flight"
5. "Bravado"
6. "Red Sector A"
7. "La Villa Strangiato"
8. "A Farewell to Kings"
9. "New World Man"
10. "The Spirit of Radio"

Set Two

1. "Tom Sawyer"
2. "Red Barchetta"
3. "YYZ"
4. "Limelight"
5. "The Camera Eye"
6. "Witch Hunt"
7. "Vital Signs"
8. "Time Stand Still"
9. "Closer to the Heart"
10. "2112: Overture / The Temples of Syrinx / Grand Finale"

Encore

1. "By-Tor and the Snow Dog"
2. "Working Man"
Boston (September 12, 2026)

Set One

1. "Xanadu"
2. "The Spirit of Radio"
3. "The Analog Kid"
4. "Freewill"
5. "Subdivisions"
6. "Bravado"
7. "La Villa Strangiato"
8. "Far Cry"
9. "The Trees"
10. "Limelight"

Set Two

1. "2112: Overture / The Temples of Syrinx / Discovery / Presentation / Oracle: The Dream / Soliloquy / Grand Finale"
2. "Animate"
3. "Closer to the Heart"
4. "A Passage to Bangkok"
5. "Time Stand Still"
6. "YYZ"
7. "Anthem"
8. "Red Barchetta"
9. "The Garden"
10. "Tom Sawyer"

Encore

1. "Finding My Way"
2. "Working Man"
Boston (September 14, 2026)

Set One

1. "Xanadu"
2. "Dreamline"
3. "Subdivisions"
4. "Headlong Flight"
5. "Bravado"
6. "Red Sector A"
7. "La Villa Strangiato"
8. "A Farewell to Kings"
9. "New World Man"
10. "The Spirit of Radio"

Set Two

1. "Tom Sawyer"
2. "Red Barchetta"
3. "YYZ"
4. "Limelight"
5. "The Camera Eye"
6. "Witch Hunt"
7. "Vital Signs"
8. "Time Stand Still"
9. "Closer to the Heart"
10. "2112: Overture / The Temples of Syrinx / Grand Finale"

Encore

1. "By-Tor and the Snow Dog"
2. "Working Man"
Cleveland (September 17, 2026)

Set One

1. "Xanadu"
2. "Limelight"
3. "Subdivisions"
4. "The Pass"
5. "Freewill"
6. "Bravado"
7. "The Trees"
8. "La Villa Strangiato"
9. "The Anarchist"
10. "The Spirit of Radio"

Set Two

1. "2112: Overture / The Temples of Syrinx / Discovery / Presentation / Oracle: The Dream / Soliloquy / Grand Finale"
2. "Animate"
3. "Closer to the Heart"
4. "A Passage to Bangkok"
5. "Time Stand Still"
6. "YYZ"
7. "Anthem"
8. "Red Barchetta"
9. "The Garden"
10. "Tom Sawyer"

Encore

1. "Finding My Way"
2. "Working Man"
Cleveland (September 19, 2026)

Set One

1. "Xanadu"
2. "Dreamline"
3. "Subdivisions"
4. "Headlong Flight"
5. "Bravado"
6. "Red Sector A"
7. "La Villa Strangiato"
8. "A Farewell to Kings"
9. "New World Man"
10. "The Spirit of Radio"

Set Two

1. "Tom Sawyer"
2. "Red Barchetta"
3. "YYZ"
4. "Limelight"
5. "The Camera Eye"
6. "Witch Hunt"
7. "Vital Signs"
8. "Time Stand Still"
9. "Closer to the Heart"
10. "2112: Overture / The Temples of Syrinx / Grand Finale"

Encore

1. "By-Tor and the Snow Dog"
2. "Working Man"
San Antonio (September 23, 2026)

Set One

1. "Xanadu"
2. "The Spirit of Radio"
3. "The Analog Kid"
4. "Freewill"
5. "Subdivisions"
6. "Bravado"
7. "La Villa Strangiato"
8. "The Trees"
9. "Distant Early Warning"
10. "Limelight"

Set Two

1. "2112: Overture / The Temples of Syrinx / Discovery / Presentation / Oracle: The Dream / Soliloquy / Grand Finale"
2. "Animate"
3. "Closer to the Heart"
4. "A Passage to Bangkok"
5. "Time Stand Still"
6. "YYZ"
7. "Anthem"
8. "Red Barchetta"
9. "Witch Hunt"
10. "Tom Sawyer"

Encore

1. "Finding My Way"
2. "Working Man"
San Antonio (September 25, 2026)

Set One

1. "Xanadu"
2. "Dreamline"
3. "Subdivisions"
4. "Headlong Flight"
5. "Bravado"
6. "Red Sector A"
7. "La Villa Strangiato"
8. "A Farewell To Kings"
9. "The Spirit of Radio"

Set Two

1. "Tom Sawyer"
2. "Red Barchetta"
3. "YYZ"
4. "Limelight"
5. "The Camera Eye"
6. "Witch Hunt"
7. "Vital Signs"
8. "Time Stand Still"
9. "Closer to The Heart"
10. "2112 ("Overture, "Temples of Syrinx" "Grand Finale")"

Encore

1. "By-Tor and the Snowdog"
2. "Working Man"
San Jose (October 15, 2026)

Set One

1. "Xanadu"
2. "Limelight"
3. "Subdivisions"
4. "The Pass"
5. "Freewill"
6. "Bravado"
7. "La Villa Strangiato"
8. "Natural Science"
9. "The Spirit of Radio"

Set Two

1. "2112 ("Overture", "The Temples of Syrinx", "Discovery", "Presentation", "Oracle: The Dream", "Soliloquy", "Grand Finale")"
2. "Animate"
3. "Closer to The Heart"
4. "Passage To Bangkok"
5. "Time Stand Still"
6. "YYZ"
7. "Anthem"
8. "Red Barchetta"
9. "The Garden"
10. "Tom Sawyer"

Encore

1. "Finding My Way"
2. "Working Man"

== Tour dates ==
List of 2026 concerts
Date	City	Country	Venue
June 7	Inglewood (Note: Labeled as Los Angeles in promotional material.)	United States	Kia Forum
June 9	Inglewood	United States	Kia Forum
June 11	Inglewood	United States	Kia Forum
June 13	Inglewood	United States	Kia Forum
June 18	Mexico City	Mexico	Palacio de los Deportes
June 20	Mexico City	Mexico	Palacio de los Deportes
June 26	Fort Worth	United States	Dickies Arena
June 28	Fort Worth	United States	Dickies Arena
July 11 (Note: Rescheduled from June 30 because of illness.)	Fort Worth	United States	Dickies Arena
July 13 (Note: Rescheduled from June 24 because of border delays and then from July 2 to because of illness.)	Fort Worth	United States	Dickies Arena
July 16	Chicago	United States	United Center
July 18	Chicago	United States	United Center
July 20	Chicago	United States	United Center
July 22	Chicago	United States	United Center
July 28	New York City	United States	Madison Square Garden
July 30	New York City	United States	Madison Square Garden
August 1	New York City	United States	Madison Square Garden
August 3	New York City	United States	Madison Square Garden
August 7	Toronto	Canada	Scotiabank Arena
August 9	Toronto	Canada	Scotiabank Arena
August 11	Toronto	Canada	Scotiabank Arena
August 13	Toronto	Canada	Scotiabank Arena
August 21	Philadelphia	United States	Xfinity Mobile Arena
August 23	Philadelphia	United States	Xfinity Mobile Arena
August 26	Detroit	United States	Little Caesars Arena
August 28	Detroit	United States	Little Caesars Arena
September 2	Montreal	Canada	Bell Centre
September 4	Montreal	Canada	Bell Centre
September 12	Boston	United States	TD Garden
September 14	Boston	United States	TD Garden
September 17	Cleveland	United States	Rocket Arena
September 19	Cleveland	United States	Rocket Arena
September 23	San Antonio	United States	Frost Bank Center
September 25	San Antonio	United States	Frost Bank Center
October 1	Houston	United States	Toyota Center
October 5	Denver	United States	Ball Arena
October 7	Denver	United States	Ball Arena
October 10	Seattle	United States	Climate Pledge Arena
October 12	Seattle	United States	Climate Pledge Arena
October 15	San Jose	United States	SAP Center
October 21	St. Louis	United States	Enterprise Center
October 23	Cincinnati	United States	Heritage Bank Center
October 25	Washington, D.C.	United States	Capital One Arena
October 27	Washington, D.C.	United States	Capital One Arena
October 30	Uncasville	United States	Mohegan Sun Arena
November 1	Uncasville	United States	Mohegan Sun Arena
November 5	Hollywood, Florida	United States	Hard Rock Live
November 7	Hollywood, Florida	United States	Hard Rock Live
November 9	Tampa	United States	Benchmark International Arena
November 11	Tampa	United States	Benchmark International Arena
November 15	Pittsburgh	United States	PPG Paints Arena
November 20	Charlotte	United States	Spectrum Center
November 22	Charlotte	United States	Spectrum Center
November 25	Atlanta	United States	State Farm Arena
November 27	Atlanta	United States	State Farm Arena
December 1	Glendale	United States	Desert Diamond Arena
December 3	Glendale	United States	Desert Diamond Arena
December 6 (Note: Rescheduled from October 17 due to illness.)	San Jose	United States	SAP Center
December 10	Edmonton	Canada	Rogers Place
December 12	Edmonton	Canada	Rogers Place
December 15	Vancouver	Canada	Rogers Arena
December 17	Vancouver	Canada	Rogers Arena

List of 2027 concerts
Date	City	Country	Venue
January 15	Buenos Aires	Argentina	Movistar Arena
January 17	Santiago	Chile	Estadio Bicentenario de La Florida
January 22	Curitiba	Brazil	Arena da Baixada
January 24	São Paulo	Brazil	Nubank Parque
January 26	São Paulo	Brazil	Nubank Parque
January 30	Rio de Janeiro	Brazil	Estádio Olímpico Nilton Santos
February 1	Belo Horizonte	Brazil	Mineirão
February 4	Brasília	Brazil	Arena BRB Mané Garrincha
February 19	Nanterre (Note: Labeled as Paris in promotional material.)	France	La Défense Arena
February 21	Berlin	Germany	Uber Arena
February 23	Amsterdam	Netherlands	Ziggo Dome
February 25	Munich	Germany	Olympiahalle
February 28	Cologne	Germany	Lanxess Arena
March 2	Hamburg	Germany	Barclays Arena
March 4	Stuttgart	Germany	Hanns-Martin-Schleyer-Halle
March 8	Glasgow	Scotland	OVO Hydro
March 10	Glasgow	Scotland	OVO Hydro
March 12	Manchester	England	Co-op Live
March 14	Manchester	England	Co-op Live
March 16	London	England	The O2 Arena
March 18	London	England	The O2 Arena
March 21	London	England	The O2 Arena
March 27	Kraków	Poland	Tauron Arena Kraków
March 30	Milan	Italy	Unipol Dome
April 1	Basel	Switzerland	St. Jakobshalle Basel
April 4	Copenhagen	Denmark	Royal Arena
April 6	Fornebu (Note: Labeled as Oslo in promotional material.)	Norway	Unity Arena
April 8	Stockholm	Sweden	Avicii Arena
April 10	Helsinki	Finland	Veikkaus Arena

=== Cancelled dates ===
List of cancelled concerts
Date	City	Country	Venue	Reason
January 19, 2027	Santiago	Chile	Estadio Bicentenario de La Florida	Low ticket sales

== Personnel ==
=== Rush ===
- Geddy Lee – lead vocals, bass guitar, keyboards, synthesizer, guitar
- Alex Lifeson – guitar, backing vocals

=== Additional musicians ===
- Anika Nilles – drums, percussion
- Loren Gold – keyboards, piano, synthesizer, backing vocals

=== Guest musicians ===
- Aimee Mann – vocals on "Time Stand Still" (June 7–13, August 7)
