= Through the Camera Eye =

Video by Rush
- Released: July 17, 1985 (Betamax, VHS, Laserdisc)
- Recorded: 1981–1984
- Genre: Progressive rock
- Length: 42:34

Rush chronology
Through the Camera Eye (1985)	Chronicles (1990)

Professional ratings
Review scores
Source	Rating
AllMusic	4/5 stars

Through the Camera Eye is a videocassette/laserdisc release by the Canadian band Rush. It was released in 1985 by PolyGram Records. It contains promotional videos issued for the band's albums Moving Pictures (1981), Signals (1982) and Grace Under Pressure (1984). Absent from the collection were the videos for "Limelight" and the album version of "Tom Sawyer", both filmed at Le Studio (the same locale as the "Vital Signs" video). The live version of "Tom Sawyer" comes from the concert video Exit... Stage Left (1982). No DVD re-issue was released.

The concept of "The Camera Eye" is a literary device used by the author John Dos Passos in his U.S.A. trilogy.

== Track listing ==
1. "Distant Early Warning" - 5:31
2. "Vital Signs" - 4:42
3. "The Body Electric" - 5:08
4. "Afterimage" - 5:11
5. "Subdivisions" - 5:37
6. "Tom Sawyer" - 4:43 (Note: Live version from the Exit...Stage Left video)
7. "The Enemy Within" - 4:22
8. "Countdown" - 5:56
9. "YYZ (Credits) - 1:24

== Personnel ==
- Geddy Lee - Rickenbacker, Fender Jazz, Steinberger Bass, Minimoog Synthesizer and Moog Taurus Bass Pedals Oberheim OB-X, Oberheim OB-Xa, Oberheim DSX, Roland JP-8.
- Neil Peart - Electric and Acoustic Drums and Percussion
- Alex Lifeson - Fender Stratocaster, Gibson Les Paul, Gibson ES-355 Electric Guitars and Moog Taurus Bass Pedals
