= Grace Under Pressure Tour (album) =

Live album by Rush
- Released: August 11, 2009
- Recorded: September 21, 1984
- Venue: Maple Leaf Gardens, Toronto, Ontario, Canada
- Genre: Progressive rock, hard rock
- Length: 63:05
- Label: Anthem/Mercury Records
- Producer: Rush, Terry Brown, Jon Erickson, Geddy Lee, Alex Lifeson

Rush chronology
Retrospective III: 1989–2008 (2009)	Grace Under Pressure Tour (2009)	Working Men (2009)

Professional ratings
Review scores
Source	Rating
AllMusic	4/5 stars
The Rolling Stone Album Guide	2.5/5 stars

Grace Under Pressure Tour is a live album by Canadian progressive rock band Rush, first released as the bonus CD of Rush Replay X 3.

Originally, Grace Under Pressure Tour was released in video format on Betamax and VHS in 1986. The LaserDisc was released in 1988. The video was then remastered in stereo for the 2006 Rush Replay X 3 DVD box set, which includes a bonus CD containing the entire audio portion. The Best Buy limited edition was offered in surround-sound (5.1) .

The 2006 initial release of Rush Replay X 3 was followed by a limited-edition item sold by Best Buy. The CD included with this version contains four bonus tracks not found on previous or subsequent releases of the box set: "Limelight" and "Closer to the Heart" from the Exit...Stage Left video, and "The Spirit of Radio" and "Tom Sawyer" from the A Show of Hands video.

The Grace Under Pressure Tour CD-ROM received a standalone release on August 11, 2009. It features the same cover art as the 1984 studio album Grace Under Pressure, but with "1984 Tour" written in the bottom left hand corner. Like the DVD version, the CD includes a reproduction of the original tour book.

== Track listing ==
1. "Intro"
2. "The Spirit of Radio"
3. "The Enemy Within"
4. "The Weapon" − includes introduction by Joe Flaherty, in character as Count Floyd
5. "Witch Hunt"
6. "New World Man"
7. "Distant Early Warning"
8. "Red Sector A"
9. "Closer to the Heart"
10. "YYZ/2112: The Temples of Syrinx/Tom Sawyer"
11. "Vital Signs"
12. "Finding My Way/In the Mood"
13. "Limelight" (bonus track)
14. "Closer to the Heart" (bonus track)
15. "The Spirit of Radio" (bonus track)
16. "Tom Sawyer" (bonus track)

Tracks 13–16 appear only on the CD copies sold by Best Buy in 2006, during the initial release of Rush Replay X3. They are not included on the 2009 release.

== See also ==
- Grace Under Pressure (Rush album)
- Grace Under Pressure Tour (video)
