= Common Grounds =

Six-issue comic book limited series

- Issue #1 Cover A by J. Scott Campbell and Matt Milla

Publication information
- Publisher: Top Cow Productions
- Schedule: Monthly
- Format: Limited series
- Genre: Superhero
- Publication date: 2004
- No. of issues: 6
- Main character: See "Characters"

Creative team
- Created by: Troy Hickman
- Written by: Troy Hickman
- Artist(s): Issue #1 Cover A:: J. Scott Campbell; Matt Milla; Issue #1 Cover B, #2-6: Rodolfo Migliari; Common Grounds Pinup: James Raiz; Roland Paris; Sonia Oback; Liberty Balance Pinup: George Pérez; Mike Perkins; Tom Smith
- Penciller(s): Dan Jurgens; Michael Avon Oeming; Ethan Van Sciver; Chris Bachalo; Carlos Pacheco; George Pérez; Angel Medina; Sam Kieth
- Inker(s): Al Vey; Michael Avon Oeming; Jon Holdredge; Roland Paris; Norm Rapmund; Aaron Sowd; Tom Bar-Or; Jesus Merino; Mike Perkins; Sam Kieth
- Letterer(s): Robin Spehar; Dreamer Design
- Colorist(s): Guy Major; Peter Pantazis; Brian Buccellatto; Sonia Oback; Tom Smith; John Starr; Beth Sotelo

Collected editions
- Common Grounds: ISBN 978-1-58240-841-5

Common Grounds is a six-issue comic book limited series created by writer Troy Hickman and published by Top Cow Productions in 2004. The series examined the life of superheroes and villains in relation to a chain of coffee shops called Common Grounds.

Common Grounds was nominated for two Eisner Awards in 2005, for "Best Short Story" and "Best Anthology."

== Overview ==
The series began in 1994 as the black-and-white mini-comic, Holey Crullers, written by Hickman and drawn by Jerry Smith. It was circulated through mail order and direct sales at comic book conventions with small print runs. In 1997, Wizard magazine covered it in a four-page article.

In 2003, Wizard editor Jim McLauchlin became editor-in-chief of Top Cow Productions. He contacted Hickman about getting the rights to the Holey Crullers scripts. In early 2004, Common Grounds was launched as a six-issue limited series featuring Hickman's stories and new artwork by Dan Jurgens, George Pérez, Mike Oeming, Chris Bachalo, Sam Kieth, Angel Medina, Carlos Pacheco, and Ethan Van Sciver. Jurgens was the regular artist, providing art for one short story every issue, while one of the guest artists provided the art for additional stories.

The series received critical acclaim. In November 2007, a trade paperback was published collecting all six issues. In 2005, it was nominated for Eisner Awards in the categories "Best Anthology" and "Best Short Story" for Where Monsters Dine.

== Title ==
The original 1990s comic series, Holey Crullers, centered on a chain of doughnut shops named "Holey Crullers". The name was a word-play on a type of doughnut, a cruller with a hole in the center, that paid homage to the regular outbursts of Robin in the 1960s era Batman.

The decision to update the doughnut shops to coffee shops and change the name to Common Grounds was an attempt to be more relevant to the coffee culture in the US in the late 1990s and early 2000s. As with the previous title, the name "Common Grounds" includes some word play by referencing a safe, neutral haven for opposing viewpoints and an important aspect of coffee.

The series includes an in-story reference to the name change in issue six. The company founder explains that he wanted to call his chain "Holey Crullers", but received a letter from the lawyers of the "old 60s superhero tv show" in which the sidekick always says "Holy This" and "Holy That".

== Characters ==
- Ed Franklin
- Gerald Smith, a.k.a. Speeding Bullet
- Gabriel "Gabe" Alexander, a.k.a. Mental Midget
- Robert Louis Dupree, a.k.a. Man-Witch
- Jenny Saunders
- "John" the serial rapist
- Tim Lesley, a.k.a. Analog Kid
- Chris Lesley, a.k.a. Digital Man
- Patricia Van Buren, a.k.a. Deb-U-Ton
- Moshe Chomsky, a.k.a. The Acidic Jew
- Sam Henderson, a.k.a. Strangeness
- Clarise Henderson, a.k.a. Charm
- "Thorny" Thorndyke
- Benjamin Bellott, a.k.a. Commander Power
- James McLain, a.k.a. Blackwatch
- The Superheavyweights
  - Susan LaBelle, a.k.a. Knockout
  - Red Fox II
  - Miniaturian
  - Coldspell
  - Hi-Tec
- The Liberty Balance
  - Earl Lumley, a.k.a. Lift-Off
  - Gail Milgrim, a.k.a. Belle-Air
  - The Flaming Follicle
  - Mach Master
  - Magna-Woman
  - Captain Gallant
- The Eternal Flame
- Lea Anne Lyster, a.k.a. Kittycat
- Jeff Bailey, a.k.a. Big Money II
- Larry the delivery guy
- Grondar
- Crittorr
- Kkrapp
- Wang Dang Doodle
- Claire Grant, a.k.a. American Pi
- Zhang
- Stevie Parsons
- Michael O'Brien, a.k.a. Big Money

== Stories ==
Issue	Titles	Major Character(s)	Cover Artist(s)	Penciller(s)	Inker(s)	Colorist(s)	Release date
1	A: "Beyond the Speed of Life"; B: "Head Games"	A: Ed Franklin, Speeding Bullet; B: Mental Midget, Man-Witch	J. Scott Campbell, Matt Milla; Rodolfo Migliari^{1}	A: Dan Jurgens; B: Michael Avon Oeming	A: Al Vey; B: Michael Avon Oeming	A: Guy Major; B: Peter Pantazis	February 2004
2	A: "Roles"; B: "Elsewhere"	A: Jenny Saunders, "John"; B: Analog Kid, Digital Man	Rodolfo Migliari	A: Ethan Van Sciver; B: Dan Jurgens	A: Jon Holdredge, Roland Paris, Norm Rapmund; B: Al Vey	A: Brian Buccellato; B: Guy Major	March 2004
3	A: "Sanctuary"; B: "Heir of Truth"	A: Deb-U-Ton, The Acidic Jew; B: Strangeness, Charm	Rodolfo Migliari	A: Chris Bachalo; B: Dan Jurgens	A: Aaron Sowd, Tom Bar-Or; B: Al Vey	A: Brian Buccellato, Sonia Oback; B: Guy Major	April 2004
4	A: "Time of Their Lives"; B: "Fat Chance"; C: "Glory Days"	A: Commander Power, Blackwatch; B: Knockout, Red Fox II, Miniaturian, Coldspell, Hi-Tec; C: Lift-Off, Belle-Air, the Flaming Follicle, Mach Master, Magna-Woman, Captain Gallant	Rodolfo Migliari^{2}	A: Carlos Pacheco; B: Dan Jurgens; C: George Pérez	A: Jesus Merino; B: Al Vey; C: Mike Perkins	A & B: Guy Major; C: Tom Smith	May 2004
5	A: "Where Monsters Dine"; B: "Lovelife"	A: Larry, Grondar, Crittorr, Kkrapp, Wang Dang Doodle; B: The Eternal Flame	Rodolfo Migliari	A: Angel Medina; B: Dan Jurgens	A: Jon Holdredge; B: Al Vey	A: John Starr, Beth Sotelo; B: Guy Major	June 2004
6	A: "This'll Be the Day"; B: "Loose Ends"	A: American Pi, Zhang; B: Stevie Parsons, Michael O'Brien	Rodolfo Migliari	A: Sam Kieth; B: Dan Jurgens	A: Sam Kieth; B: Al Vey	A & B: Guy Major	July 2004

^{1} Rodolfo Migliari made the alternate cover for Issue #1.
^{2} Issue #4's cover art was inspired by Edward Hopper's "Nighthawks" painting.

== Collected Editions ==
The series has been collected in a trade paperback that includes:

- Cover and Pinup Gallery^{1}
- Common Grounds Timeline
- Holey Crullers Bonus Material
- Liberty Balance Pinup by George Pérez, Mike Perkins and Tom Smith

== Notes ==
^{1} Includes Issue #1's alternate cover by Rodolfo Migliari and a pinup by James Raiz, Roland Paris and Sonia Oback depicting various superheroes battling Crittorr and Wang Dang Doodle.
