= Grace Under Pressure Tour =

Grace Under Pressure Tour may refer to:

- Grace Under Pressure Tour (album), a 2006 album by Rush
- Grace Under Pressure Tour (video), a concert video by Rush

== See also ==
- Grace Under Pressure (Rush album)
