= Grace Under Pressure Tour (video) =

Video by Rush
- Released: March 28, 1986 (Betamax, VHS); 1988 (Laserdisc); May 1, 2007 (DVD)
- Recorded: September 21, 1984
- Venue: Maple Leaf Gardens (Toronto, Ontario, Canada)
- Genre: Rock
- Label: Anthem/Mercury

Rush chronology
Exit...Stage Left (1982)	Grace Under Pressure Tour (1986)	A Show of Hands (1989)

Grace Under Pressure Tour is a concert released on Betamax, VHS, Laserdisc, and DVD by the Canadian band Rush. It documents a live concert performance by the band on their 1984 tour in support of the studio album Grace Under Pressure.

== Release dates and formats ==
The Betamax and VHS videocassettes were the original formats of release, in 1986, under the title Grace Under Pressure Tour. The Laserdisc was released in 1988. In addition to the "Grace Under Pressure" concert, the original releases also included a full-length music video for "The Big Money," a truncated version of which was released to outlets like MTV and on the short-lived CD Video format. This version of Grace Under Pressure Tour is currently out-of-print in all three formats.

In 2006, a DVD version of the original production, retitled Grace Under Pressure 1984, with its audio re-mastered in 5.1-channel Dolby Surround by Rush guitarist and co-producer Alex Lifeson, was released as part of the DVD box set, titled Rush Replay X 3. In 2007, the DVD version of Grace Under Pressure 1984, as it was included in Replay X 3, was released as a single, stand-alone DVD. As a unique feature, Rush Replay x 3 includes an audio CD of Grace Under Pressure Tour that was unavailable elsewhere until a stand-alone CD release on August 11, 2009. The DVD release does not include the music video for "The Big Money."

== Filming location ==
The concert footage documented in Grace Under Pressure Tour was filmed on September 21, 1984 at Maple Leaf Gardens, in Toronto, Ontario, Canada.

== Track listing ==
1. Three Stooges Intro ("Three Blind Mice")
2. "The Spirit of Radio"
3. "The Enemy Within"
4. "The Weapon"
5. "Witch Hunt"
6. "New World Man"
7. "Distant Early Warning"
8. "Red Sector A"
9. "Closer to the Heart"
10. Medley: "YYZ"/"2112: The Temples of Syrinx"/"Tom Sawyer"
11. "Vital Signs"
12. Medley: "Finding My Way"/"In the Mood"

== Personnel ==
- Geddy Lee: Bass and rhythm guitar, vocals, synthesizers, bass pedal synthesizer
- Alex Lifeson: Electric and acoustic guitars, bass pedal synthesizer
- Neil Peart: Drums and percussion
- Joe Flaherty: Count Floyd (filmed introduction for "The Weapon")

== See also ==
Grace Under Pressure (Rush album) (studio album)

Grace Under Pressure Tour (album) (audio only versions)
