= Mad Vantage =

Australian progressive metal/jazz fusion band

- Mad Vantage performing in Melbourne, 2025

Background information
- Origin: Melbourne, Victoria, Australia
- Genres: progressive metal; jazz fusion; nu jazz; jazz; progressive rock; math rock
- Years active: 2021–present
- Label: Art As Catharsis
- Members: Selene Messinis; Tim Cox; Kumar Shome; Ben Finnis
- Past members: Matthew Hayes
- Website: www.selenemessinis.com

Mad Vantage is an Australian progressive metal/jazz band based in Melbourne, founded by keyboardist and composer Selene Messinis.

The group released their debut album MINUTIAE. in 2025, with it being described as "a towering collision of progressive metal, nu-jazz, and cinematic tension."

In October 2025, Selene was selected as the recipient of the Melbourne International Jazz Festival's Take Note initiative, leading to the composition and performance of Mad Vantage's upcoming second album.

The band supported Rush drummer Anika Nilles on her Australian tour in December 2025.

== Discography ==
=== Studio Albums ===
Title	Details	Peak chart positions	
Title	Details	AUS Jazz	AIR Independent Albums
MINUTIAE.	Released: 7 November 2025; Label: Art As Catharsis	4	14

== Awards and nominations ==
=== APRA AMCOS Art Music Awards ===
The annual Art Music Awards are presented by APRA AMCOS in conjunction with the Australian Music Centre (AMC) to recognise achievement in the composition, performance, education, and presentation of Australian music.

Year	Nominee / work	Award	Result	Ref.
2026	Press	Performance of the Year: Jazz & Improvised Music	Nominated	
