= Rodolfo Migliari =

Argentine comic artist (born 1976)

- Born: May 21, 1976 (age 50)
- Area: Art
- Notable works: City of Heroes; Green Lantern; Rogue

Rodolfo Migliari (born May 21, 1976) is an Argentine comic book cover artist and painter. He is best known for creating the painted portrait of the Justice Society of America that appears in the Smallville episode Absolute Justice. And for illustrating the covers of Rogue, Green Lantern Corps and Blackest Night.

== Bibliography ==
Migliari's comics cover art (except where indicates) includes:

=== DC ===
- Blackest Night, miniseries, #4-7, hardcover edition (2009–10)
- Blackest Night: Tales of the Corps, miniseries, #2 (2009)
- DCU Holiday Special 2008 (interior art)
- Final Crisis: Resist (2008)
- Final Crisis: Submit (2008)
- Green Arrow, vol. 4, #9-11 (2011)
- Green Lantern Corps, vol. 2, #22, 27-28, 34-37, 47-48 (2008-10)
- Green Lantern, vol. 4, #43 (2009)
- Green Lantern: Emerald Warriors, miniseries, #1-7 (2010-11)
- Superman #682 (2009)

==== Compilations ====
  - Blackest Night: Green Lantern Corps, Hardcover edition
  - Blackest Night: Green Lantern, Hardcover edition
  - Blackest Night Hardcover
  - Blackest Night: Black Lantern Corps HC
  - Blackest Night: Black Lantern Corps #2 HC

=== Image ===
- City of Heroes #1-14 (2005-06)
- Common Grounds #1-6 (2004)
- Covenant
- Four Eyes #1 (2008)
- Freshmen #1-6
- Freshmen Yearbook
- Freshmen II #1-6
- Hunter Killer Dossier
- Noble Causes #2 (2004)
- Wanted #1 (2003)
- Witchblade #92, 104 (interior art, among other artists) (2005-07)

=== Marvel ===
- Captain America Annual 2001
- Elektra #26 (2003)
- Last Defenders, miniseries, #5 (2008)
- Rogue #1-6 (2004-05)
- X-Men: X-Treme X-Pose, miniseries, #1-2 (2003)
- Villains for Hire, miniseries, #1-4 (2011-12)

=== Wizard Entertainment ===
- Wizard #175 (interior art)
- Wizard #186 (cover)
- Wizard Mega movie Issue spring 2005 (interior art)
- Wizard Mega movie Issue summer 2006 (interior art)
- How to Draw Advanced Techniques (cover with Terry Dodson)

=== Other publishers ===
- Buddy Scalera’s Men and Boys photo reference (Impact)
- KISS 4K #1-6 (Platinum Studios)
- Star Wars: Infinities - Return of the Jedi, miniseries, #1-4 (Dark Horse, 2003)
- Vampirella #3 (Dynamite Entertainment)

== Interviews ==
- NCI: Noticias TV Interview
- rtve.es Radio Interview
