= Red Barchetta =

"Red Barchetta (live)"

Single by Rush

from the album Exit...Stage Left
- A-side: "Subdivisions"
- Released: October 22, 1982 (UK)
- Recorded: March 27, 1981
- Venue: Montreal Forum
- Genre: Progressive rock; hard rock
- Length: 6:46
- Label: Mercury
- Songwriters: Neil Peart; Geddy Lee; Alex Lifeson
- Producers: Rush; Terry Brown

Rush UK singles chronology
"Closer to the Heart" / "Freewill" (1981)	"Subdivisions" / "Red Barchetta" (live) (1982)	"Countdown" / "New World Man" (1982)

Music video
- "Red Barchetta" on YouTube

"Red Barchetta" is a song by the Canadian rock band Rush, from their 1981 studio album Moving Pictures.

== Background ==
The song was inspired by the futuristic short story "A Nice Morning Drive ", written by Richard Foster and published in the November 1973 issue of Road & Track magazine. The story describes a similar future in which increasingly stringent safety regulations have forced cars to evolve into massive Modern Safety Vehicles (MSVs), capable of withstanding a 50-mile-per-hour (80 km/h) impact without injury to the driver. Consequently, drivers of MSVs have become less safety-conscious and more aggressive, and "bouncing" (intentionally ramming) the older, smaller cars is a common sport among some.

Rush drummer and lyricist Neil Peart made several attempts to contact Foster during the recording of Moving Pictures but Road & Track did not have an up-to-date address and Rush were forced to settle for a brief "inspired by" note in the lyric sheet mentioning the story. In July 2007, Foster and Peart finally made contact with each other. Foster later posted on his website an account of their journey by motorcycle through the backwoods of West Virginia between stops on Rush's 2007 Snakes & Arrows Tour.

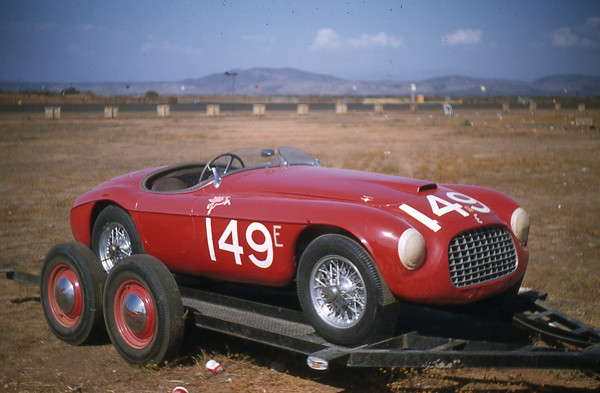
"A brilliant red Barchetta from a better, vanished time ..."

Barchetta, literally "small boat" in Italian, is the diminutive form of barca ("boat" or "craft"). In the automotive industry, the term is used for a two-seat car without any kind of roof. The proper Italian pronunciation is [barˈketta], with a /k/ rather than the /tʃ/ sung by Geddy Lee. Neil Peart's favorite car was the 1948 Ferrari 166MM ″Barchetta″.

== Lyrics ==
The song's lyrics tell a story set in a future in which many classes of vehicles have been banned by a "Motor Law." The narrator's uncle has kept one of these now-illegal vehicles (the titular red Barchetta sports car) in pristine condition for roughly 50 years and is hiding it at his secret country home, which had been a farm before the Motor Law was enacted. Every Sunday, the narrator commits a "weekly crime" of sneaking out to this location and going for a drive in the countryside. During one such drive, he encounters a "gleaming alloy air car" wide enough to take up the entire two-lane road. Both it and a second such vehicle chase the narrator until he drives across a one-lane bridge that is too narrow to accommodate them. As the song ends, the narrator returns safely to his uncle's home.

== Composition ==
In the book Rush and Philosophy: Heart and Mind United, Jim Berti & Durrell Bowman wrote of the song:

"Red Barchetta" itself repeatedly "fixes" its temporal complications at the ends of many sections. In the exciting passage that most closely approximates the feeling of speeding, unhindered, down an empty road (when the protagonist "commits his weekly crime", 2:28-2:58), the music is filled with syncopated accents that keep thrusting us forward. In addition, each phrase takes away two beats from normative four-measure groups in 4/4; we're moving faster than can be contained within standard phrases. But the last group, punctuated with Lee's "adrenaline surge", brings back those two beats—we're entering a new zone, where time can now flow freely. And indeed, in the next section (2:58-3:18), while changing harmonies takes us on a bit of a journey, the phrases lock comfortably into relaxed four-bar groups in 4/4. The following guitar solo (3:18-3:41) introduces further metric complications, alternating 4/4 and 3/4 bars for eight units of seven beats each. But again the last unit brings back the "missing" beat, making for a satisfying conclusion of eight beats before we head back into the main song. And for the final, peaceful phrases built around Lifeson's guitar harmonics (from 5:10), while the initial groups imply 4/4 phrases lasting a somewhat unexpected two, six and again six bars, from 5:32 to the song's fade normative eight-bar groups sound the rest of the way.

== Reception ==
Rolling Stone listed the song at number 5 on their list "The 10 Best Rush Songs".

Ultimate Classic Rock ranked the song number 3 on their list of "All 167 Rush Songs Ranked Worst to Best".

== See also ==
- List of songs recorded by Rush
