= Power Windows (album) =

Studio album by Rush
- Released: October 11, 1985
- Recorded: April–August 1985
- Studios: The Manor (Oxfordshire); AIR (Montserrat); Sarm East (London); Abbey Road (London); Angel (London)
- Genres: Art pop; new wave; progressive rock; synth-rock; hard rock
- Length: 44:44
- Label: Anthem
- Producers: Peter Collins; Rush

Rush chronology
Grace Under Pressure (1984)	Power Windows (1985)	Hold Your Fire (1987)

Singles from Power Windows
- 1. "The Big Money" Released: October 4, 1985; 2. "Mystic Rhythms" Released: January 27, 1986

Power Windows is the eleventh studio album by Canadian rock band Rush, released on October 11, 1985 in Canada by Anthem Records and on October 21, 1985 in the United States on Mercury Records. After touring in support of their previous album, Grace Under Pressure (1984), the band took a break and reconvened in early 1985 to begin work on a follow-up. The material continued to display the band's exploration of synthesizer-oriented music, this time with the addition of sampling, electronic drums, a string section, and choir, with power being a running lyrical theme. Power Windows was recorded in Montserrat and England with Peter Collins as co-producer and Andy Richards on additional keyboards.

The album reached No. 5 in Canada, No. 9 in the United Kingdom, and No. 10 in the United States. In January 1986, the album reached platinum certification by the Recording Industry Association of America (RIAA) for one million copies sold in the United States. Rush released two singles from the album, "The Big Money" and "Mystic Rhythms". The band supported the album with their 1985–1986 tour.

== Background and writing ==
In November 1984, the band ended their concert tour in support of their previous album, Grace Under Pressure (1984). After a short respite, the group started work for a follow-up album in early 1985. Guitarist Alex Lifeson looked back at this period, and noted their conscious effort in taking the strongest elements of their previous two records, Signals (1982) and Grace Under Pressure and capitalizing on them for Power Windows. To Lifeson, this resulted in a more cohesive and satisfying album.

In February 1985, Rush had relocated to Elora Sound Studios in Elora, Ontario to write and rehearse new songs. Drummer Neil Peart would write a set of lyrics from the studio's farmhouse while Lifeson and frontman Geddy Lee worked on music to fit Peart's words in the adjacent barn which housed a 24-track recording studio. Peart worked on a small desk in his room, "about the right size for a five-year-old". During this time, Peart researched the Manhattan Project to write lyrics for the same-titled song. He also had a head start, having written outline lyrics for "The Big Money", "Mystic Rhythms", and "Marathon" before these sessions had begun. Lee and Lifeson sorted through jams recorded at soundchecks on tour and Lifeson's own tapes of ideas to assemble music for the three tracks, with each song taking up to a week. They then began on "Middletown Dreams", "Marathon" once again, and then "Grand Designs". Having worked out some material, Rush underwent a five-day warm-up tour in Florida in March 1985 to sharpen their performance and to test the new songs on stage prior to recording. Peart continued to work on lyrics in his hotel room in Miami.

Following their warm-up gigs, the band returned to Elora and continued working on their new songs, their break away being a positive impact on their work upon returning. Peart had initially struggled to finish "Territories" and "Manhattan Project", "but now they just fell together". On their first day back at Elora, Peart began work on lyrics for "Emotion Detector" as the group had discussed the possibility of recording a ballad for their new album. Upon presenting his words to Lee and Lifeson, his lyrics fit to the piece of music that his bandmates were working on at the time. This was followed by Rush arranging the music for "Emotion Detector" and "Territories", after which they had assembled a demo tape of seven new songs ready to present to Collins for recording.

Later in 1985, Peart told an interviewer that Rush's sound "is changing from having been progressive to not being progressive". He noted that though the album might "seem simpler", it was just as difficult to compose and perform. Lifeson expressed some resistance to the emphasis on keyboards during this period of their history. He noted the trend began on Signals which pushed his guitar parts too far into the background as a result. However, he thought Rush achieved a much greater balance of the two instruments on Power Windows, which he thought Moving Pictures (1981) successfully had done.

== Production ==
Rush recorded Power Windows from April to August 1985 in five different recording studios. The group recorded Power Windows with a new producer, Peter Collins. During their warm-up gigs in Florida, the band first met Australian engineer James "Jimbo" Barton, whom Collins had recommended. They accepted, and Peart later praised Barton's contributions and suggestions to the band, considering his small recommendations to improve a song, which he referred to as "events", was "just what we were looking for". Lifeson compared the experience of recording Power Windows as more pleasant and fun than Grace Under Pressure, which presented various problems for the band. He added that the album contained elements that Rush had not incorporated before and broke several boundaries that had existed with previous albums. Lee supported this view and said the group decided "not to hold anything back" and make the album first and focus later on the music's onstage presentation.

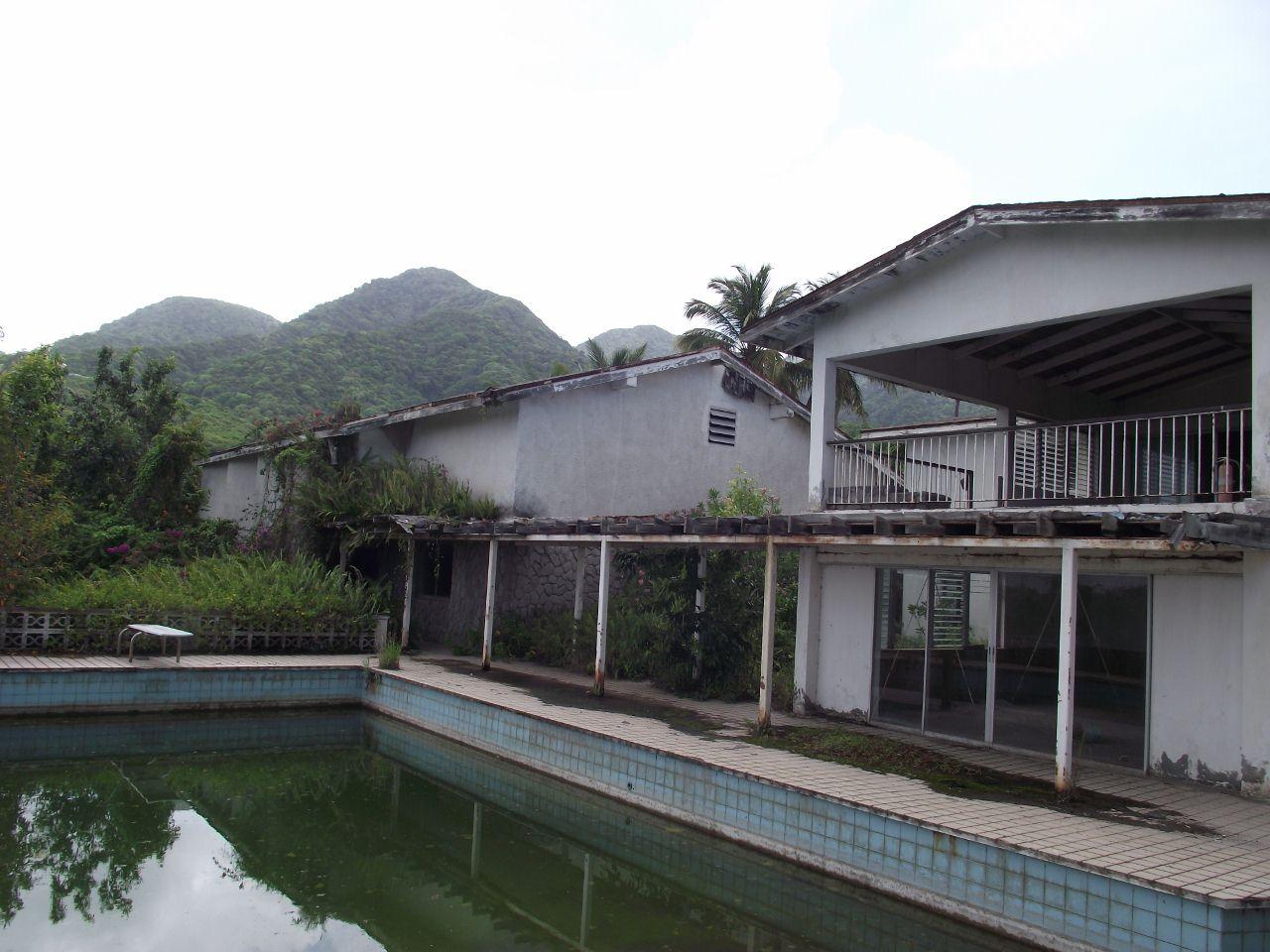
Rush relocated to AIR Studios in Montserrat, the ruins of which are pictured here in 2013, to record guitar overdubs.

Recording began at The Manor Studios in Oxfordshire, England, where the basic rhythm tracks and keyboards were recorded more quickly than usual, in the span of five weeks, to capture more spontaneous performances ready for overdubs. They followed a different recording method to prior albums: a rough song structure was recorded to tape first - guide vocals, keyboards and guitars to a click track - then they would play live as a band to this song structure, keeping the drum parts and overdubbing/replacing everything else. This way, they could focus more on getting the track down on one piece of tape and punch in when needed, no longer needing to record multiple song passes to edit the best parts from.

At the Manor, the music was recorded using two Studer A800 24-track tape machines with an SSL console. It was during sessions at The Manor where Rush brought in musician Andy Richards to play additional synthesizers and assist in their programming. His rig consisted of a PPG Wave 2.3 synthesizer connected to a Roland Super Jupiter module through a MIDI system, a Yamaha QX-1 digital sequencer, and a Roland Jupiter-8 and Yamaha DX7 synthesizer. In one instance, Peart's drum technician Larry Allen drove with him to London to collect a set of African and Indian drums to use on "Mystic Rhythms", and bongos for "Territories".

In May 1985, the band had relocated to AIR Studios in the island of Montserrat in the Caribbean. They had discussed recording at the studio for several years and booked the facility for three weeks for Lifeson to record guitar overdubs. The tracks were put down using two Studer tape recorders with a Neve console. Collins recalled this period of recording as painstaking work due to the various combination of microphone and amplifier set-ups that were experimented. This was followed by a return to England in June to record in London, firstly at Sarm East Studios. The band chose to live together in a single apartment rather than separate hotel rooms. At Sarm East, the guitar solos and Lee's vocals were put down.

Mixing began in July after the band took a one-week break from the material, which coincided with decisions on the final running order, artwork, credits, and photos. In August, the string section was recorded which featured a 30-piece orchestra in studio 1 at Abbey Road Studios. Rush wanted musician and arranger Anne Dudley to complete the string arrangements, which she agreed to do, and the group was conducted by Andrew Pryce Jackman. A 25-piece choir was recorded at Angel Recording Studios for the ending of "Marathon". The album completed, Lee oversaw the mastering in New York City in September, and proofs were approved for the album cover.

== Content ==
Power Windows lyrics are focused primarily on various manifestations of power. For example, "Territories" comments on nationalism around the world. Like "Subdivisions" from Signals, "Middletown Dreams" explores suburban monotony and the average person's attempts to temporarily escape it. "Grand Designs" was partly written to criticise mainstream music which the group believed was too superficial. The song also echoes individualistic themes such as non-conformism.

== Songs ==
"The Big Money" features the sampling of Peart's voice mimicking a drum beat using an AMS sampler and triggered through his Simmons drum kit. It's a quadruple fill at about the 16 second mark.

"Manhattan Project" explores the development and explosion of the first nuclear weapon at the Manhattan Project. The track was difficult for the band to put together, partly due to Peart's difficulty in writing lyrics from an objective point of view, rather than as an observer of the event. Lifeson recalled that Peart had "thoroughly" researched the topic beforehand.

"Marathon" was anticipated by Lifeson to be difficult to arrange and record, but it turned out to be one of the easiest songs on the album to complete. It contains various samples, the fewest recorded overdubs, and incorporates the string section and choir recorded in London. Collins had the idea of using a choir and the band, upon witnessing the recording, saw the humour in having "pregnant women and old men sing our song". Lifeson considered the song to be close to Peart as he had taken up cycling during days off on the Grace Under Pressure tour, riding 100 miles each time.

"Territories" was another difficult track for Rush to complete. After Peart had written some lyrical ideas he went through them with Lee, who noticed it was telling a story and found them difficult to sing once he and Lifeson had developed music for them. Peart then rewrote them in a more direct way which suited Lee better. It features the lyric "Better beer", which is an inside joke. Peart played his drum kit without a snare drum, and the middle section features a sample of Lee's voice saying the phrase "Round and round".

"Middletown Dreams" involved several rewrites before the band reached a working arrangement. After the album was completed, Lifeson expressed some dissatisfaction with the guitar parts, but it grew to become a "very satisfying" track for him.

"Emotion Detector" was initially anticipated to be easy to complete, but was more difficult than expected. It is the only track on the album that Rush has never performed live.

"Mystic Rhythms", as described by Lee, is "the most synthetic track on the record" with each instrument being fed through "a synthesized something". It features Lifeson playing an acoustic Ovation guitar which generated a synthesizer-like sound once fed through amplification.

== Sleeve design ==
The pictures on the front and back covers were painted by Hugh Syme, from reference photos taken by photographer Dimo Safari. Toronto native Neill Cunningham was the model for the album artwork.

== Critical reception ==
Professional ratings
Review scores
Source	Rating
AllMusic	3/5 stars
The Encyclopedia of Popular Music	2/5 stars
The Essential Rock Discography	5/10
Kerrang!	4/5 stars
MusicHound Rock	3/5 stars
Pitchfork	8.3/10
Rock Hard	9/10
Rolling Stone	(favourable)
The Rolling Stone Album Guide	2.5/5 stars
The Virgin Encyclopedia of 80s Music	2/5 stars

Power Windows has been met with mixed reviews from music critics. AllMusic's Eduardo Rivadavia retrospectively described the album as Rush's coldest album, citing the sparse, horn-like guitar playing of Lifeson, the prominent synthesizer of Lee and Peart's crisp, clinical percussion and stark lyrical themes. However, he also described the album as one that rewards patience and repeated listens. Rolling Stone magazine, in a positive review of the album, highlighted a number of bands that seemingly influenced Power Windows, such as The Police, U2, Genesis, and Siouxsie and the Banshees. The review concludes that Power Windows may be the missing link between Yes and the Sex Pistols. In 2005, the album was ranked number 382 in Rock Hard magazine's book The 500 Greatest Rock & Metal Albums of All Time. It was also in the top ten of a 2014 Rolling Stone website reader poll of best Rush albums.

Power Windows introduced more synthesizers into the band's sound. During the period when the album was produced, the band were expanding into new directions from their progressive rock base, having "tightened up their sidelong suites and rhythmic abstractions into balled-up song fists, art-pop blasts of angular, slashing guitar, spatial keyboards and hyperpercussion, all resolved with forthright melodic sense".

== Reissues ==
Although the original recording had a SPARS code of DDD and was considered to be of good quality, a remastered edition was issued in 1997. The remastered edition follows the industry's more recent trend of the loudness war, as it is considerably louder.

- The tray has a picture of three fingerprints, light blue, pink, and lime green (left to right) with "The Rush Remasters" printed in all capital letters just to the left. All remasters from Moving Pictures to A Show of Hands feature this logo, originally found on the cover art of Retrospective II.
- Includes the original grey border around the back cover image, along with lyrics and credits.

Power Windows was remastered again in 2011 by Andy VanDette for the "Sector" box sets, which re-released all of Rush's Mercury-era albums. Power Windows is included in the Sector 3 set.

Power Windows was remastered for vinyl by Sean Magee in 2015 at Abbey Road Studios as a part of the official "12 Months of Rush" promotion.

== Track listing ==
All lyrics are written by Neil Peart; all music is composed by Geddy Lee and Alex Lifeson.

Side one
No.	Title	Length
1.	"The Big Money"	5:36
2.	"Grand Designs"	5:07
3.	"Manhattan Project"	5:09
4.	"Marathon"	6:11

Side two
No.	Title	Length
1.	"Territories"	6:20
2.	"Middletown Dreams"	5:19
3.	"Emotion Detector"	5:11
4.	"Mystic Rhythms"	5:54
Total length:		44:44

== Personnel ==
Rush

- Geddy Lee – bass guitar, synthesizers, bass pedals, vocals
- Alex Lifeson – electric and acoustic guitars
- Neil Peart – drums, percussion, electric percussion

Additional personnel

- Andy Richards – additional keyboards, synthesizer programming
- Jim Burgess – synthesizer programming
- Anne Dudley – string arrangements, conductor
- Andrew Jackman – conductor, choir arrangements
- The Choir – additional vocals

Production

- Rush – production, arrangements
- Peter Collins – production, arrangements
- James "Jimbo" Barton – engineer, mixing
- Stephen Chase – assistant engineer (The Manor)
- Matt Butler – assistant engineer (AIR)
- Dave Meegan, Heff Moraes, Paul Wright – assistant engineers (Sarm East)
- Bob Ludwig at Masterdisk – original mastering
- Dimo Safari – photography
- Hugh Syme – art direction, graphics, cover design and painting

== Charts ==
=== Weekly charts ===
Chart (1985)	Peak position
Canada Top Albums/CDs (RPM)	5
Dutch Albums (Album Top 100)	44
European Albums (European Top 100 Albums)	57
Finnish Albums (Suomen virallinen lista)	16
Swedish Albums (Sverigetopplistan)	26
UK Albums (Official Charts)	9
US Billboard 200	10
US AOR Albums (Radio & Records)	3

Chart (2026)	Peak position
Greek Albums (IFPI)	29

=== Year-end charts ===
Chart (1985)	Position
Canada Top Albums/CDs (RPM)	34
US AOR (Radio & Records)	67

Chart (1986)	Position
US (Billboard 200)	77

== Certifications ==
Region	Certification	Certified units/sales
Canada (Music Canada)	Platinum	100,000^{^}
United Kingdom (BPI)	Silver	60,000^{^}
United States (RIAA)	Platinum	1,000,000^{^}
^{^} Shipments figures based on certification alone.
