= Troy Hickman =

American comic book writer

- Area: Writer
- Notable works: Common Grounds

Troy Hickman is an American comic book writer. He received two Eisner Award nominations for Common Grounds and in 2008 was one of the winners of the Top Cow Pilot Season competition for his comic, Twilight Guardian.

== Biography ==
Hickman spent a decade in independent comics before getting his break with Top Cow where he wrote Common Grounds, a series that looked at superheroes gathered in a coffee shop.

He wrote issues 4–6 of the Top Cow run of the City of Heroes comic book. The story for these issues would prove popular enough to later become playable content in the City of Heroes MMORPG in Issue 11, and he scripted this as well. Hickman was also an active member of the City of Heroes forums until the game and its forums were closed on November 30, 2012.

Hickman entered the second Top Cow Pilot Season competition with "Twilight Guardian," a story which was one of the two winners and was turned into a four issue series which received great critical acclaim. This series has also been optioned for a film.

Hickman lives in Lafayette, Indiana.

== Bibliography ==
Comics work includes:

- Narcoleptic Man (with co-author Shane Simmons and art by Tony Furtado, Magnetic Ink, 2000)
- Turok: Adon's Curse (art by Ryan Benjamin, Acclaim Comics, 1998)
- Common Grounds (with pencils by Dan Jurgens, George Pérez, Michael Oeming. Chris Bachalo, Ethan Van Sciver, Angel Medina, Sam Kieth, and Carlos Pacheco, covers by Rodolpho Migliari, and inks by Al Vey, 6-issue limited series, 2004, Top Cow, tpb, ISBN 1-58240-436-4)
- Witchblade #76–77 (with art by Michael Choi, Top Cow, 2004)
- City of Heroes #4–6 (with pencils by Wilson Tortosa and inks by Sonia Oback, Top Cow, 2006)
- ACTOR Comics Presents (Incredible Hulk story, with William Messner-Loebs and Armando Gil, Marvel Comics, 2006)
- Pilot Season: "Twilight Guardian" (with art by Reza, Top Cow, 2008)
- Twilight Guardian: Heroes and Villains #1-4 (with art by Sid Kotian and colors by Bill Farmer, 2011)
- A Little Night Music (City of Heroes MMORPG guest author arc, 2010)

== Awards ==
2005: Nominated for Eisner Awards, Common Grounds (Best Short Story and Best Anthology)
