= 1986 (American TV program) =

American news magazine

- Genre: News magazine
- Directed by: George Paul
- Presented by: Roger Mudd; Connie Chung
- Country of origin: United States
- Original language: English
- No. of seasons: 1

Production
- Camera setup: Multi-camera
- Running time: 48 mins.

Original release
- Network: NBC
- Release: June 10 – December 30, 1986

1986 is an American news magazine television series that aired on NBC from June 10 to December 30, 1986. The lead anchors were Roger Mudd and Connie Chung. Maria Shriver also contributed to the program.

The show was NBC's 14th attempt in 17 years to launch a prime time news program in a similar fashion that both CBS (60 Minutes) and ABC (20/20) had successfully done. Roger Mudd was particularly agitated over the quick cancellation of the program and left the network shortly thereafter. It was not until 1992 that NBC finally found a successful program in that mold with Dateline NBC, which still airs new episodes as of July 2026.

The program used the song Mystic Rhythms, by the Canadian rock band Rush, as its opening theme.
