= Marathon (Rush song) =

Promotional single by Rush

from the album Power Windows and A Show of Hands
- Released: 1986, 1988
- Genre: Art pop; new wave; progressive rock
- Length: 6:09
- Label: Mercury
- Songwriters: Neil Peart, Alex Lifeson and Geddy Lee
- Producers: Peter Collins and Rush

Rush singles chronology
"Manhattan Project" (1986)	"Marathon" (1986)	"Time Stand Still" (1987)

Music video
- "Marathon" on YouTube

"Marathon" is the fourth track on Canadian rock band Rush's 1985 album Power Windows.

It is written by Rush guitarist Alex Lifeson and bassist/vocalist/keyboardist Geddy Lee, and its lyrics are written by drummer and lyricist Neil Peart. The lyrics depict how one would feel while running in an actual marathon, but the meaning of the song is meant to use a marathon (an extreme challenge) as a metaphor for life, and say that life is full of obstacles and is all about one taking small steps to achieve their personal goals.

In a 1986 interview, Peart said "(Marathon) is about the triumph of time and a kind of message to myself (because I think life is too short for all the things that I want to do), there's a self-admonition saying that life is long enough. You can do a lot -- just don't burn yourself out too fast trying to do everything at once. "Marathon" is a song about individual goals and trying to achieve them. And it's also about the old Chinese proverb: 'The journey of a thousand miles begins with one step."

The live version released on the "A Show of Hands" single reached number 6 on the US Mainstream Rock chart in 1989.

== Composition ==
During the mid-1980s, Rush's style was beginning to lean towards a more synthesizer based style of rock music, as opposed to their earlier, heavier guitar based hard rock and progressive rock. During the mid-1980s, Neil Peart was also beginning to experiment with an electronic drum kit. Power Windows is perhaps Rush's most heavily synthesizer influenced album. All of these elements are evident throughout the album, including on "Marathon". It contains different sections with both Geddy Lee's synthesizer as the lead instrument, as well as Alex Lifeson's guitar as the lead instrument. During the chorus, Lee's synthesizer is most prominent, while during the verses and solo passages there is a mix between synthesizer and guitar.

== See also ==
- List of Rush songs
