= The Analog Kid =

Song by Rush

from the album Signals
- Released: September 9, 1982
- Recorded: 1982
- Genre: Progressive rock
- Length: 4:47
- Label: Anthem
- Songwriters: Geddy Lee; Alex Lifeson; Neil Peart
- Producers: Rush, Terry Brown

Rush singles chronology
"Subdivisions" (1982)	"The Analog Kid" (1982)	"The Weapon" (1982)

"The Analog Kid" is a song by the Canadian progressive rock band Rush from their 1982 album Signals. It reached number 19 on the Mainstream Rock chart.

"The Analog Kid" is a moderately fast song and was originally written in the key of A major. It’s played in common time.

== Recording ==
The song originates from when the band stayed at Virgin Gorda in the British Virgin Islands in January 1982, travelling on a yacht that was named Orianda.

Drummer and lyricist Neil Peart wrote the lyrics for the song at first as a companion piece to "Digital Man", a song that Rush had started working on in late 1981, and presented it to bassist Geddy Lee. Peart and Lee talked about what could be done with the lyrics in a musical sense. They eventually decided on the opposite on what the words may suggest, with Peart describing the track as "a very up-tempo rocker, with some kind of a dynamic contrast for the choruses".

Peart said the song was his first attempt at non-fiction: "For the longest time I stepped into characters until I had my own confidence and technique to be able to step outside them as a writer."

== In popular culture ==
"The Analog Kid", along with "Digital Man" (another song from the album) served as the inspiration for the writer Troy Hickman to create the comic book heroes of the same names in the 2004 comic Common Grounds.

== Reception ==
Greg Prato of AllMusic, in a review for the album, said that the song was an example that Rush did not forget to "rock out" after adding synthesizers to their sound.

In 2016, Prog wrote that it was the 7th best Rush song from the 1980s.

Classic Rock readers voted "The Analog Kid" the band's 24th best song.
