= Sonia Oback =

American comic book colorist

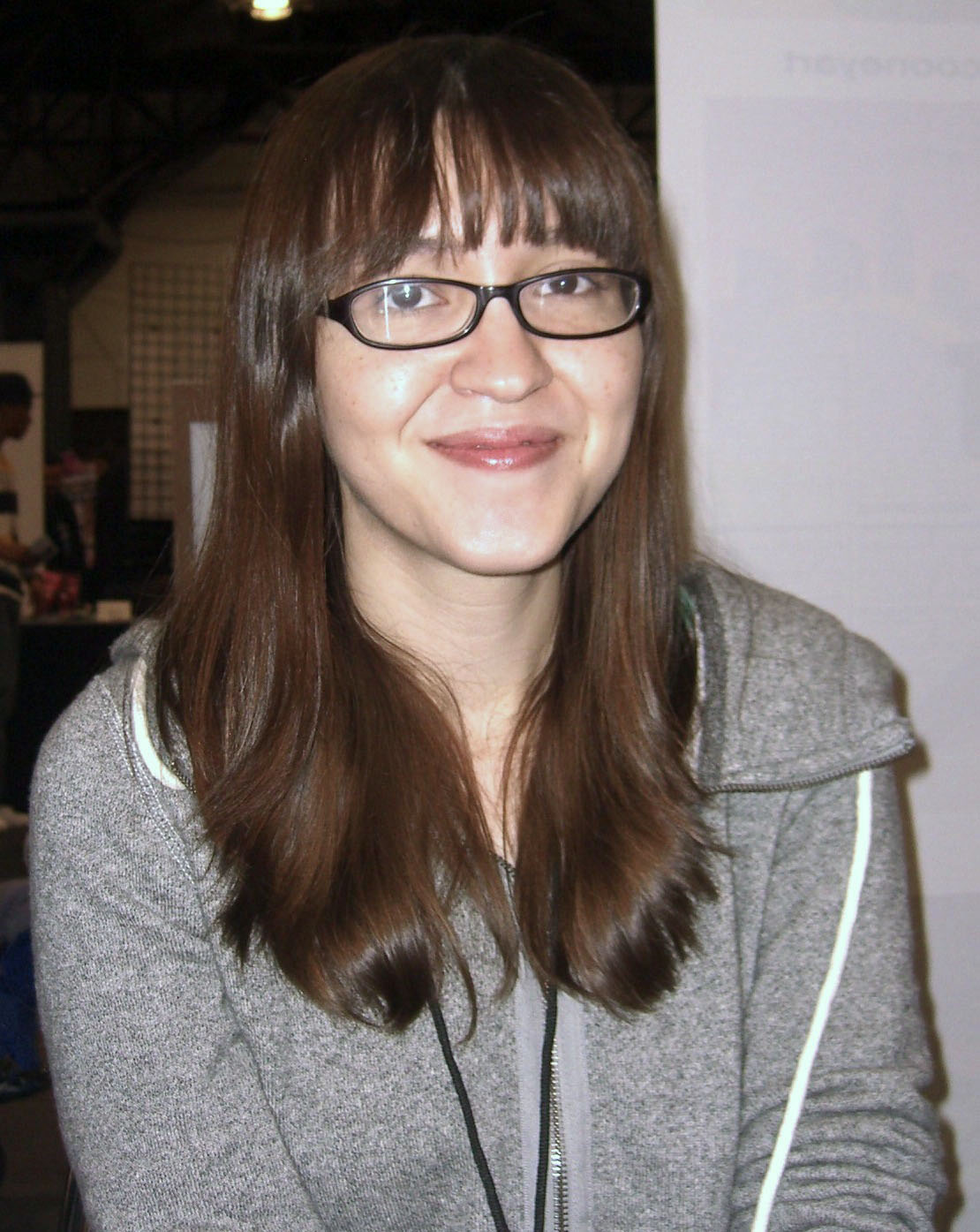
- Area: Colourist
- Notable works: Witchblade

Sonia Oback is an American comic book colorist who is best known for her work on the Top Cow Productions series Witchblade. She is also known for her work on the Uncanny Spider-Man Series.

== Career ==
Oback started on Witchblade with issue #75, in a back-up story assisting Brian Buccellato. In 2006, she worked on X23: Target X.

In 2010, Oback worked on a pictorial featuring comedic actress Olivia Munn in the April/May 2010 issue of Complex magazine, and on its cover. The pictorial featured Munn interacting with illustrated animals in a forest setting, drawn by Mike Choi and colored by Oback.

She served as a comic artist for Justice League of America #4 in the 2013 series.

== Bibliography ==
=== Interior art ===
- City of Heroes #1-11
- The Darkness VOL 2 #19-24
- The Gift #11-14
- KM3 Studios 2006 Sketchbook
- Witchblade #75-76, 92-101
- X23: Target X #1-6

=== Cover art ===
- Battle of the Planets: Princess #2-4
- Helios #3
- KM3 Studios 2006 Sketchbook
- Vampirella Jay Company Wizard World Exclusive Cover
- Witchblade #97, 100-101
- Witchblade #80 Holiday eBay Exclusive
- Witchblade #83 WWLA Exclusive,
- X23: Target X #1-6
- X23: Target X #1 Top Cow Exclusive Cover
