= Anika Nilles =

German drummer and composer (born 1983)

- Nilles in 2026

Background information
- Born: 29 May 1983 (age 43); Aschaffenburg, West Germany
- Genres: Progressive rock; jazz fusion; pop
- Occupations: Musician; songwriter; drummer; educator; composer
- Instrument: Drums
- Label: Sakurai
- Website: anikanilles.com

YouTube information
- Channel: anykmusic
- Years active: 2012–present
- Subscribers: 285 thousand
- Views: 34.1 million
- Last updated: 24 October 2026

Anika Nilles (/nɪləs/; born 29 May 1983) is a German drummer, composer, and musical educator. She launched her career on YouTube during the early 2010s, and has released three full-length albums to date, all with the backing band Nevell: Pikalar (2017), For a Colorful Soul (2020) and False Truth (2025). On 6 October 2025, Nilles was announced as the touring drummer for Rush. She is with Rush for its Fifty Something Tour, which goes from June 2026 to May 2027.

== Early life ==
Nilles was born into a family with many drummers and started drumming at age six. When interviewed by South African Drummer, she mentioned having two uncles, one cousin and a father who are drummers. Her father "taught me the first grooves as he realised I was interested in drumming."

After school, Nilles had a career in social education, which she left to pursue drumming full-time. She earned a degree in popular music from the Popakademie Baden-Württemberg in Mannheim.

== Career ==
Nilles posted her first original compositions "Wild Boy" in 2013, followed by "Alter Ego" in 2014. These and other music videos usually contain a visual recording of her drumming alongside previously recorded music. In such videos, she has historically cooperated with producer and guitarist Joachim Schneiss. Afterward, Nilles began acquiring work and viral attention outside of her native Germany, including tours of Europe, the United States, and China in 2015.

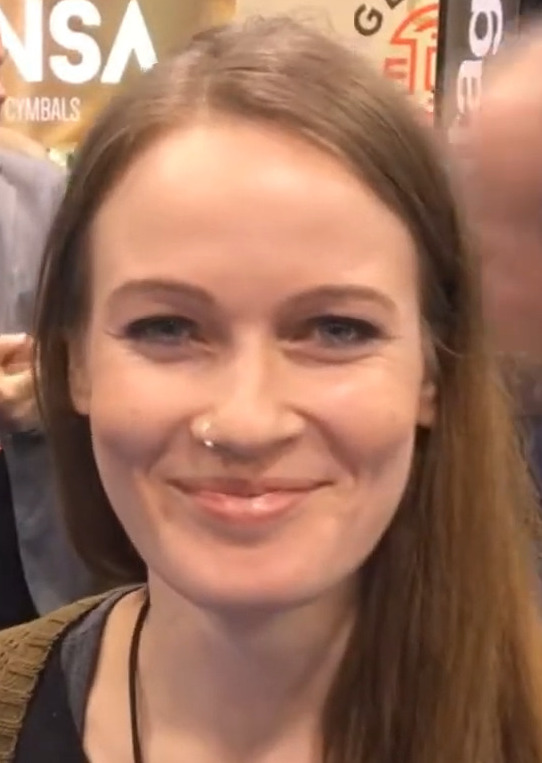
Nilles in 2017

In 2017, Nilles' debut album Pikalar was released; it consists of ten instrumental tracks. As promotion for the album, Nilles was the cover artist and interviewee for the June 2017 edition of Modern Drummer Magazine. In the interview, Nilles stated that she coined the word "pikalar", which is intended "to stand for things that happen in life that you can't describe".

Nilles embarked on a six-date US clinic tour in October 2018. She performed at venues such as the Chicago Music Exchange, Sweetwater Sound in Fort Wayne, Indiana, and Salt City Drums in Salt Lake City. her second full-length album For A Colorful Soul, featuring her band Nevell, was released in 2020. It reached number three on the US-iTunes-Top40-Jazz chart as well as number three in Germany.

Nilles teaches at Nexus ICA (UK), at Drumeo (Canada) and at Popakademie Baden-Württemberg (GER). Since 2021, she has also been head of the drums department at Popakademie Baden-Württemberg.

Nilles joined Jeff Beck's live band for his US and European tour in 2022. In October 2025, Nilles was announced as the drummer for Rush's 2026 Fifty Something Tour. Nilles was featured on the cover of Modern Drummer Magazine's September 2026 issue, her second cover with the magazine. She discussed her preparation and approach to performing Neil Peart's drum compositions.

=== Influences ===
Jeff Porcaro of Toto is a primary influence for Nilles. Her other influences include Carter Beauford, Jojo Mayer, Sheryl Crow, Joe Satriani, Dave Matthews Band, Joss Stone, Stanton Moore, and Prince.

== Equipment ==
Nilles has endorsed Meinl Cymbals, Tama Drums, and Evans Drumheads. Meinl released a custom 18" Artist Concept Model Deep Hats cymbals that was conceptualized by Nilles. She also uses Promark sticks, and formerly Mapex Drums.

== Technique ==
Nilles tends to incorporate alternate note groupings, such as with quintuplets and sextuplets, over a ^{4}_{4} backbeat.

== Awards ==
Year	Contest	Award
2015	Drummie Awards	Rising Star
2016	Drummie Awards	Rising Star
2016	Modern Drummer Readers Poll	Up And Coming Artist
2017	DRUM!	#2 Best Fusion Drummer
2017	UK Drummie Awards	#3 Best Educator
2018	MusicRadar Awards	#1 Best Clinician
2019	MusicRadar Awards	#3 Best Clinician

== Personal life ==
Nilles resides in Mannheim, Germany.

== Discography ==
- "Chary Life" (Sakurai Records, single, 2014)
- "Synergy" (Sakurai Records, single, 2015)
- Pikalar (Sakurai Records, full-length, 2017)
- For a Colorful Soul (Sakurai Records, full-length, 2020)
- "Florida" (Sakurai Records, single, 2021)
- Opuntia (Sakurai Records, EP, 29 April 2022)
- False Truth (Sakurai Records, full length, 2025)
