= The Big Money =

Single by Rush

from the album Power Windows
- B-side: "Red Sector A" (live) (US) "Middletown Dreams" (UK) "Territories" (UK)
- Released: October 4, 1985
- Genre: Hard rock; electronic rock; synth-pop
- Length: 5:35
- Label: Mercury
- Songwriters: Neil Peart; Alex Lifeson; Geddy Lee
- Producers: Peter Collins; Rush

Rush singles chronology
"Afterimage" (1984)	"The Big Money" (1985)	"Mystic Rhythms" (1986)

Music video
- "The Big Money" on YouTube

"The Big Money" is a song by Canadian rock band Rush, originally released on their 1985 album Power Windows. It peaked at #45 on the Billboard Hot 100 and #4 on the Mainstream Rock chart, and has been included on several compilation albums, such as Retrospective II and The Spirit of Radio: Greatest Hits 1974-1987.

The lyrics, written by drummer Neil Peart, reflect on the power of "big money" and the sheer magnitude of trade in the modern global economy, particularly during the 1980s. When asked about the idea that the song's lyrics were inspired by a John Dos Passos book of the same name, Peart replied, "I am a big fan of Dos Passos' stylistic ability, his poetic approach to prose, but the ideas presented in the songs are quite different from those which he exemplified." Peart also stated that "the only connection is in the titles".

== Reception ==
Cash Box said that "The Big Money" had "a huge production sound, a dynamic arrangement and a techno-rock feel" with a "throbbing beat and an array of musical chops." Billboard labeled it as one of the strongest tracks on Power Windows. Reviewing a March 15, 1985 concert by Rush at the Hollywood Sportatorium for The Palm Beach Post, Jim Presnell reported a performance "The Big Money" that "sound incredibly strong".

== Music video ==
The video for the track was directed by Rob Quartly, produced by Allan Weinrib (Geddy Lee's brother), and created by Green Light Productions, using, for the time, state-of-the-art computer graphics similar to those seen in the video for the song "Money for Nothing" by Dire Straits. The video also features the band performing the song on an oversized Monopoly-style game board with the words "Big Money" in the middle. A full-length version of the video was included on the VHS and laserdisc releases of Rush's Grace Under Pressure tour concert film, while an edited version was released to MTV and other outlets, as well as on the short-lived CD Video format, directed by Weinrib.

The car featured in the animated intro has a license plate that reads "Mr. Big", a reference to producer Peter Collins, who produced Power Windows. Neill Cunningham, the album cover model for Power Windows, also appears in the video.

== Charts ==
Weekly chart performance for "The Big Money"
Chart (1985–86)	Peak position
Canada (CHUM)	20
UK Singles (OCC)	46
US Billboard Hot 100	45
US Mainstream Rock Airplay (Billboard)	4

== See also ==
- List of Rush songs
