= Manhattan Project (song) =

Song by Rush

from the album Power Windows
- Released: October 11, 1985
- Recorded: 1985
- Genre: Art pop; progressive pop
- Length: 5:05
- Label: Mercury
- Songwriters: Neil Peart, Alex Lifeson and Geddy Lee
- Producers: Peter Collins and Rush

Rush singles chronology
"Territories" (1985)	"Manhattan Project" (1985)	"Mystic Rhythms" (1986)

"Manhattan Project" is a 1985 song by Canadian progressive rock band Rush, named after the WWII project that created the first atomic bomb. The song appeared on Rush's eleventh studio album Power Windows in 1985. "Manhattan Project" is the third track on the album and has a run-time of 5:07.

== Background ==
Lyricist Neil Peart read "a pile of books" about the Manhattan Project before writing the lyrics so that he had a better understanding of the topic. Anne Dudley was responsible for the string arrangements during the instrumental interlude. Some of the fretless bass sounds were played by Andy Richards on a synthesizer; during live renditions of the song, Lee covered these parts using a sampler.

"Manhattan Project" received 51 adds to album oriented rock radio station playlists in the United States during the week ending October 25, 1985, becoming the fifth most added song in that format according to Radio & Records. One month later, 63% of album oriented radio stations had included the song in their playlists. The song reached No. 10 on the US Mainstream Rock Chart in January 1986.

== Chart performance ==
Chart (1986)	Peak position
US Mainstream Rock (Billboard)	10

== See also ==
- List of songs recorded by Rush
- List of anti-war songs
