= Signals (Rush album) =

Studio album by Rush
- Released: September 9, 1982
- Recorded: April – July 15, 1982
- Studios: Le Studio, Morin-Heights, Quebec, Canada
- Genres: Progressive rock; new wave; synth rock
- Length: 43:12
- Label: Anthem
- Producers: Rush; Terry Brown

Rush chronology
Exit... Stage Left (1981)	Signals (1982)	Grace Under Pressure (1984)

Singles from Signals
- 1. "New World Man" Released: August 27, 1982; 2. "Subdivisions" Released: October 22, 1982; 3. "Countdown" Released: April 29, 1983 (UK)

Alternative cover
- 40th anniversary reissue

Signals is the ninth studio album by Canadian rock band Rush, released on September 9, 1982, by Anthem Records. After the release of their previous album, Moving Pictures, the band started to prepare material for a follow-up during soundchecks on their 1981 concert tour and during the mixing of their subsequent live album Exit...Stage Left. Signals demonstrates the group's continuing use of synthesizers, sequencers and other electronic instrumentation. It is the final album produced by their longtime associate Terry Brown, who had worked with them since 1974.

The album peaked at No. 1 in Canada, No. 3 in the United Kingdom and No. 10 in the United States. In November 1982, the record was certified platinum by the Recording Industry Association of America for selling one million copies in the United States. Rush released three singles from the album: "New World Man", which became the band's highest charting single in the United States and a number-one hit in Canada, as well as "Subdivisions" and "Countdown". The group supported Signals with a concert tour from April 1982 to May 1983. Signals has been reissued several times, including a remaster with a new stereo and 5.1 surround sound mix in 2011.

== Background and recording ==
In July 1981, Rush ended their tour in support of their previous album Moving Pictures. The album became their most commercially successful of their history, granting them their first No. 1 album in Canada and selling over one million copies in the United States at the tour's conclusion. Rush then took a three-month break, during which they oversaw the production and mixing of their second live release, Exit...Stage Left, at Le Studio in Morin-Heights, Quebec. In one of drummer and lyricist Neil Peart's diary entries written during this time, he had been cleaning a Hayman drum kit that was housed in the studio and, in September 1981, began working out a song with two members of the band's road crew, the unreleased "Tough Break". Peart was also working on lyrics, in particular a set which included "Subdivisions", a track the group would later record for Signals.

Having arranged some material for their next studio album, Rush toured North America and Europe from October to December 1981 with a setlist that contained "Subdivisions". The new compositions drew from influences including reggae musician Bob Marley and English new wave bands such as Orchestral Manoeuvres in the Dark, Ultravox and The Police. Rush had their sound man capture their soundchecks on tape which provided a method of developing new songs, which was particularly the case for "Chemistry". The majority of Signals was written and rehearsed in early 1982. Geddy Lee has said that the group were aware of how easy it would have been to "play it safe" and produce another Moving Pictures, a mindset the band was entirely against. The album displays the band continuing to incorporate the synthesizer into their songs with less emphasis on guitar-oriented riffs which had been the focus of their sound in the 1970s. Lee considered Signals as the beginning of a new era for the band. In hindsight, he said it was considerably difficult to make because it took longer than usual for the band to achieve the right feel for each song.

Some ideas that Alex Lifeson and Lee had initially saved for potential solo albums were used on Signals. Writer and journalist Greg Quill noticed a "cyclical framework" in Signals, specifically the album opening in suburbia followed by contemplating escape in "The Analog Kid". Then, "universal human imponderables" are explored through humanity, sex, religion, and aging, which ends in an actual escape in "Countdown". Quill spoke to Peart about this theory, to which the drummer replied: "You noticed that. We were hoping no one would. It's so unfashionable these days to construct grand concepts. We're being closed mouthed about it".

Recording began at Le Studio in April 1982, and ended on July 15. It is Rush's last album co-produced by their longtime associate Terry Brown, who had worked with them since 1974. He was joined by engineer Paul Northfield with assistance from Robbie Whelan. With Signals, Rush took a different production approach to the album: they did less guitar overdubbing than previously, becoming less guitar-heavy and allowing more presence from Lee's synthesizers. As per Lee, "instead of setting up as a power trio, we wanted to set up as a four-piece band without using a lot of overdubbing to achieve that". Rush intended to finish the album in June, but had to spend additional time in the studio which led to a month's reduction in their planned vacation time. Upon completion, the album was mastered by Bob Ludwig at Masterdisk.

== Songs ==
=== Side one ===
"Subdivisions" was one of the first songs Rush had arranged for Signals. After Peart devised a set of lyrics, Lifeson and Lee wrote a collection of musical ideas to fit Peart's words. Peart recalled that his bandmates interrupted him as he was cleaning his car and set up a portable cassette player on the driveway outside the studio, and played him what they had come up with. Peart added: "I listened closely, picking up the variations on 7/8 and 3/4, the way the guitar adopts the role of rhythm section while the keyboards take the melody, returning to bass with guitar leading in the chorus, then the Mini-moog taking over again for the instrumental bridge", and told Lifeson and Lee that he liked it.

"The Analog Kid" originated during the group's stay at Virgin Gorda in the British Virgin Islands in January 1982, travelling on a yacht named Orianda. Peart had written the words to the song initially as a companion piece to "Digital Man", which Rush had started working on in late 1981, and presented it to Lee. The two discussed what could be done with the lyrics in a musical sense, deciding on the opposite on what the words may suggest, with Peart describing the track as "a very up-tempo rocker, with some kind of a dynamic contrast for the choruses".

"Chemistry" was developed during soundchecks on the Moving Pictures tour in 1981. It was during one particular session during the United States leg whereby, after each member checking each of their instruments separately, "a little spontaneous creation" came about which produced a song without the group realising it. Each member played a different part; Lee played what became the keyboard section for the bridge, Lifeson the guitar riffs heard in the verses, and Peart the drum pattern for the chorus. Upon listening to the soundcheck tapes, Lifeson and Lee took each section and arranged it into a complete track before they produced a demo which almost matched the version recorded for the album. "Chemistry" marked the first time that each member collaborated on the lyrics to a song, with Lifeson and Lee devising its title, concept, and several phrases that they wished for it to include. Peart then took their ideas and developed a set of complete lyrics. He named "Chemistry" as the easiest song to write for Signals.

"Digital Man" was one of the songs worked on during the late 1981 writing sessions at Le Studio, during which the music and lyrics for its verses, plus the ska-influenced bridge, was worked out. The song was also heavily influenced by funk, with Lee's bass line described as "so funky and fluid its almost laughable". Its instrumental break has been compared with "Walking on the Moon" by The Police. The song developed further in March 1982 during the band's one month stay at The Grange in Muskoka Lakes, Ontario. Peart wrote the remaining lyrics by an open fire in his chalet while Lifeson and Lee worked on the music in the adjacent barn. After numerous attempts they devised a combination of suitable words and music for the chorus, and Peart wrote: "We were all very pleased with the dynamic and unusual nature of the part, it was so different for us". However, Brown expressed a lack of enthusiasm to record the song and remained so until the group had continually talked about why it worked "until he got tired of hearing about it". "The Analog Kid" and "Digital Man" served as the inspiration for comic book writer Troy Hickman to create heroes of the same names in his 2004 comic Common Grounds.

=== Side two ===
"The Weapon" is the second part of Rush's "Fear" song series. During a writing session at a northern Ontario manor home in 1981, Lee and his friend Oscar devised what Peart described as the foundation of "a highly mysterious and bizarre drum pattern" with his drum machine. At a subsequent rehearsal, Peart learned to play the part on his own drum kit which required him to alter his usual technique, but took the experience as an enjoyable challenge.

"New World Man" was put together in May 1982 when the backing tracks for the album's other seven tracks were completed, and there was enough space on the vinyl for a song under four minutes. Had the track become too long, the band would have put it down and used it for a subsequent release. "New World Man" began with Peart writing lyrics that tied in themes from other songs on the album, "and came up with a straightforward, concise set of lyrics consisting of the two verses and the two choruses". The group adopted a "fast and loose" approach for its corresponding music and worked swiftly, with the song fully arranged in one day and recorded in the course of the next.

"Losing It" originated from a theme Lifeson had come up with which was used in subsequent rehearsal sessions to produce a demo with keyboards and drums. In June 1982, when the band revisited the song in the studio, they discussed the possibility of Ben Mink of the band FM playing the electric violin somewhere on Signals, and decided that "Losing It" was the best track for his contribution. To cater for the part, Rush put down the basic track for a jazz-oriented solo section and invited Mink to the studio which included him multi-tracking various notes to resemble a complete string section. The lyrics include references to the latter years of writer Ernest Hemingway–"For you the blind who once could see, the bell tolls for thee". It was not played live until 2015 when Rush performed it at five concerts on their R40 Live Tour.

"Countdown" was inspired by the band attending the launch of the STS-1 Columbia space shuttle in April 1981, the first of NASA's Space Shuttle program. They had been invited to the launch and observed it from a VIP area at an air base in Cape Kennedy, Florida. The song features samples of radio communications recorded before and during the flight.

== Artwork ==
The sleeve was designed by Hugh Syme, who is credited with its concept, direction, and graphics, with photography from Deborah Samuel. Syme based his design upon receiving merely the album's title, and recalled a "great deal of trouble" in a cover that he and the group were satisfied with. "I decided that, with such a phenomenally important word with the kind of potency it potentially had, to go with something really dumb, really inane". He noted, however, that the cover still tied into the meaning of some of the songs on the album, in particular "Chemistry". The final concept came out from the result of several failed ideas, including one that Syme devised which would have involved Rush hooked up to electroencephalography machines as they played in the studio and a snapshot of their heartbeats and brain waves taken during a performance.

The front photograph depicts a Dalmatian dog sniffing a red fire hydrant on a green lawn. Samuel shot the image on the rooftop of her studio. The lawn is a piece of AstroTurf, and the hydrant was rented from Toronto and repainted the desired colour for the cover. She recalled a search to find a Dalmatian who could sniff on command, and placed dog biscuits underneath the hydrant multiple times to get the final shot. The back cover is a pretend blueprint of a neighbourhood with what Lee described as "make believe subdivisions", detailing Warren Cromartie Secondary School, a fictional school named after baseball player Warren Cromartie. He and the Montreal Expos are thanked in the album's liner notes. Syme considered the back cover "a little subtle, perhaps over-indulgent".

== Release ==
The album was released in September 1982. The album peaked at No. 1 in Canada, No. 3 in the United Kingdom, and No. 10 in the United States. In November 1982, the album was certified platinum by the Recording Industry Association of America for selling one million copies in the United States.

Rush released five singles from Signals. "New World Man" reached No. 21 on the Billboard Hot 100 singles chart for three weeks in October and November 1982. It is the band's highest charting single in the US, and the only one to have reached the top 40.

== Reception ==
Professional ratings
Review scores
Source	Rating
AllMusic	4/5 stars
Classic Rock	4/5 stars
The Encyclopedia of Popular Music	3/5 stars
The Essential Rock Discography	6/10
MusicHound Rock	3/5 stars
Rolling Stone	2/5 stars
The Rolling Stone Album Guide	3/5 stars
The Virgin Encyclopedia of 80s Music	3/5 stars

At the time of release, Rolling Stone criticised the band's choice of "emphasizing synthesizers at the expense of Alex Lifeson's guitar," calling the album "mostly a wasted effort."

Louder called Signals the 29th best album of the 80s.

AllMusic retrospectively praised the album, complimenting the band for not simply making Moving Pictures, Pt. II, continuing their exploration of the synthesizer and introducing more contemporary themes into the lyrics.

Ultimate Classic Rock placed Signals seventh in their list of "Top 10 Rush Albums," while Stereogum placed the album third (behind Moving Pictures and 2112) in their list of "Rush Albums From Worst to Best," labelling it "the most audacious album of the band's career."

In the 2010 documentary film Rush: Beyond the Lighted Stage, Trent Reznor cited Signals as an influence for incorporating keyboards into hard rock. Canadian music journalist Martin Popoff stated that Signals was his favorite Rush album because of the "creamy production."

In 2022, Guitar World named Signals the #9 greatest rock guitar album of 1982, saying that although there was a "shift to a more electro-synth sound", there was "still room for Alex Lifeson to do his thing on his six-string", and that "Geddy Lee remained the best bassist in rock".

== Reissues ==
Year	Label	Format	Notes
1994	Mobile Fidelity Sound Lab	CD	Gold CD remaster. "The Weapon" has one line of lyrics missing at 3:12. The label stated this was the case on the master tape delivered to them. Both "New World Man" and “Digital Man” have endings a few seconds longer.
2011	Anthem	CD, DVD	Digitally remastered as part of the three-volume Sector box sets, also available in 5.1 surround sound.
2015	Mercury	LP, digital format	Digitally remastered.
2023	Mercury	LP, Blu Ray, digital format	Three digitally remastered formats: (1) Super Deluxe Edition, (2) one-LP Picture Disc Edition, and (3) Dolby Atmos Digital Edition

== Track listing ==
All lyrics are written by Neil Peart except where noted; all music is composed by Alex Lifeson and Geddy Lee.

Side one
No.	Title	Lyrics	Length
1.	"Subdivisions"		5:35
2.	"The Analog Kid"		4:47
3.	"Chemistry"	Lee, Lifeson, Peart	4:57
4.	"Digital Man"		6:23

Side two
No.	Title	Length
5.	"The Weapon" (Part II of "Fear")	6:24
6.	"New World Man"	3:42
7.	"Losing It"	4:53
8.	"Countdown"	5:49

=== 40th Anniversary Super Deluxe Edition (2023) ===
Subdivisions / Red Barchetta (Live) 7"

No.	Title	Length
1.	"Subdivisions"	5:35
2.	"Red Barchetta" (Live)	6:46

Countdown / New World Man 7"

No.	Title	Length
1.	"Countdown"	5:49
2.	"New World Man"	3:42

New World Man / Vital Signs (Live) 7"

No.	Title	Length
1.	"New World Man"	3:42
2.	"Vital Signs" (Live)"	5:12

The Weapon (Single Edit) / Digital Man 7"

No.	Title	Length
1.	"The Weapon (Single Edit)"	4:18
2.	"Digital Man"	6:23

== Personnel ==
Credits are taken from the album's 1982 liner notes.

Rush

- Geddy Lee – bass guitars, synthesizers, vocals
- Alex Lifeson – electric and acoustic guitars, Moog Taurus pedals
- Neil Peart – drums, percussion

Additional musician

- Ben Mink – electric violin on "Losing It"

Production

- Rush – production, arrangements
- Terry Brown – production, arrangements
- Paul Northfield – engineer
- Robbie Whelan – assistant engineer
- JVC – digital mastering
- Bob Ludwig at Masterdisk – original mastering
- Deborah Samuel – photography
- Kineblok Inc. – photographic colour optics
- Hugh Syme – art direction, graphics, cover concept
- Ray Danniels, SRO Productions – management
- Moon Records – executive production

== Charts ==
=== Weekly charts ===
Chart (1982)	Peak position
Canada Top Albums/CDs (RPM)	1
Dutch Albums (Album Top 100)	31
Norwegian Albums (VG-lista)	33
Swedish Albums (Sverigetopplistan)	19
UK Albums (Official Charts)	3
US Billboard 200	10

Chart (2023)	Peak position
German Albums (Offizielle Top 100)	88

=== Year-end charts ===
Chart (1982)	Position
Canada Top Albums/CDs (RPM)	7
US Top Pop Albums (Cash Box)	46

== Certifications ==
Region	Certification	Certified units/sales
Canada (Music Canada)	Platinum	100,000^{^}
United Kingdom (BPI)	Silver	60,000^{^}
United States (RIAA)	Platinum	1,000,000^{^}
^{^} Shipments figures based on certification alone.
