= Mystic Rhythms =

Single by Rush

from the album Power Windows
- B-side: "Emotion Detector"
- Released: January 27, 1986
- Length: 5:54
- Label: Mercury
- Songwriter(s): Neil Peart, Alex Lifeson and Geddy Lee
- Producer(s): Peter Collins and Rush

Rush singles chronology
"The Big Money" (1985)	"Mystic Rhythms" (1986)	"Time Stand Still" (1987)

Music video
- "Mystic Rhythms" on YouTube

"Mystic Rhythms" is a song by the Canadian rock band Rush. It was released as the second single from their 1985 album Power Windows. The single charted at number 21 on the US Mainstream Rock chart. The song appeared on the live album A Show of Hands and the live DVD R30: 30th Anniversary World Tour. For this song, drummer Neil Peart utilized his electronic drum kit, playing it on the album and in concert during live performances of the track.

The song was used as the opening song of the NBC news program 1986.

The music video was directed by Gerald Casale, who is a member of Devo.

== Charts ==
Chart performance for "Mystic Rhythms"
Chart (1986)	Peak position
US Mainstream Rock (Billboard)	21

== See also ==
- List of Rush songs
