= Countdown (Rush song) =

Single by Rush

from the album Signals
- A-side: "New World Man"
- Released: April 29, 1983
- Genre: Progressive rock
- Length: 5:49
- Label: Mercury
- Songwriters: Alex Lifeson; Geddy Lee; Neil Peart
- Producers: Rush; Terry Brown

Rush singles chronology
"Subdivisions" (1982)	"Countdown" (1983)	"Distant Early Warning" (1984)

Music video
- "Countdown" on YouTube

"Countdown" is a song by the Canadian rock band Rush. It is the closing track on their ninth studio album Signals (1982). Its lyrics are about the first launch of the Space Shuttle Columbia the previous year.

== Composition ==
The song incorporates audio from voice communications between astronauts John Young and Robert Crippen and ground control, specifically Ascent CAPCOM Daniel C. Brandenstein and with commentary from Hugh Harris, Kennedy Space Center Public Affairs Officer, leading up to the launch through to LOS just after Press to Rota.

We met our liaison man, who conducted us safely into the "V.I.P." zone (Red Sector A) in the pre-dawn hours. We were due to play that night in Dallas, so we couldn't wait much longer. Finally they announced that the launch would be scrubbed for that day. Well, we ran for the car, and our daring driver sped off, around the traffic jams, down the median of the highway, and got us to the airport barely in time.

The next night we had a show in San Antonio, after which we drove off immediately, clambered into a hired jet, and flew straight back to Florida. This time the launch took place on schedule, and it was SOMETHING!!

I remember thinking to myself as we flew back to Fort Worth after a couple days without sleep: "We've got to write a song about this!" It was an incredible thing to witness, truly a once-in-a-lifetime experience. I can only hope that the song comes even close to capturing the excitement and awe that we felt that morning.

— Neil Peart in the Signals tour book.

The song incorporates a driving rhythm and heavy use of synthesizers, with Geddy Lee switching between his synthesizer on the verses and his Rickenbacker 4001 bass on the song's chorus. The lyrics paint a vivid account of the group's experiences witnessing the launch. The song closes the album, with its cautionary tales of man's reliance on technology, on a more positive, celebratory note.

The song was used as a wakeup song for astronauts during STS-109, which was the last successful flight of Space Shuttle Columbia. It was used again for astronaut Mike Fincke during STS-134, flown by Space Shuttle Endeavour on its final mission before retirement. Fincke described how his friends Greg Shurtz and NASA employee Ken Fisher chose the song because the band was inspired to write it after viewing the launch of STS-1. Fincke went on to say the song was played as a tribute to the Space Shuttle program, which has inspired people around the world.

This song, as printed in the liner notes of the Signals album, is "Dedicated with thanks to astronauts Young & Crippen and all the people of NASA for their inspiration and cooperation."

== See also ==
- List of Rush songs
