= City of Heroes (comics) =

American comic book

- Dark Horse promotional comic cover

Publication information
- Publisher: Dark Horse Comics (promotional), Blue King Studios, Top Cow Productions
- Main character(s): Apex, War Witch, Horus (Blue King Studios), Freedom Phalanx (Top Cow Productions)

Creative team
- Created by: Richard Dakan (promotional), Rick Dakan (Blue King Studios), Mark Waid (Top Cow Productions)

City of Heroes is an American comic book based on the characters and situations from the now closed City of Heroes massively multiplayer online role-playing computer game.

North American subscribers to the game originally received the City of Heroes monthly comic book in the mail; it is also available in some comic book stores. The comic follows the adventures of fictional Paragon City heroes and ties into the game's plot development at times, as well as featuring a section devoted to fan art, fan fiction, and other miscellany in the back. At times, this rear section has also included comic strips by Tim Buckley of Ctrl+Alt+Del and Aaron Williams of PS238 and Nodwick.

== Promotional comic ==
A single promotional comic was released in 2002 by Dark Horse Comics to promote the game. Written by Richard Dakan and drawn by Rick Zombo, the issue followed the story of a hero new to Paragon City named Thunder-Clap, and set some of the story behind the game, including the Fifth Column, the Freakshow, and the Statesman. This promotional issue also featured Apex and War Witch, who later became protagonists in the Blue King Studios publication of the comic book.

== Blue King Studios run ==
The comic's first volume was published by Blue King Studios and ran 12 issues cover-dated from June 2004 to May 2005. It was written by one of the game's designers, Rick Dakan, art was by Brandon McKinney. Coloring was by Moose Bauman (issues 1–4) and Austin McKinley (issues 5–12). Issue 12 was written by Neil Hendrick, who lettered the entire series.

It followed the story of the heroes Apex, a martial artist with no super powers; War Witch, a magic user who had ice blasts and a mystical fiery sword; and Horus, an Egyptian-themed hero who nearly died during the Ritki War and was saved from death by becoming the host of a Kheldian.

These characters were virtually unmentioned in the game save for an Exploration Badge in Steel Canyon stating that Apex and War Witch were roommates (and possibly lovers). There is also an exploration badge in the Faultline zone which references where Apex tracked down the archvillain, Dr. Vahzilok. In Issue #5, War Witch was made the trainer (an NPC hero where players level up) in Croatoa as a ghost. When Pocket D was revamped in February 2006, War Witch was made an NPC stationary character on the Hero side of the dance club. In Issue 20, Apex was added as a new Task Force contact, with his in game description summarizing the events of the last few issues of this series, making them official in-game canon. There have been no other mentions of Horus, yet.

== Image Comics' Top Cow Productions run ==
Beginning with the June 2005 issue, the comic book was published by Top Cow Productions, written by noted comic book writer Mark Waid, and illustrated by newcomer David Nakayama. Unlike the previous volume, this series follows the adventures of the city's most illustrious supergroup, the Freedom Phalanx led by the Statesman.

Mark Waid wrote the first three issues of the new Top Cow comic. Starting with issue four, Troy Hickman wrote a three-issue story arc entitled Smoke and Mirrors. This was followed up by Dan Jurgens, who wrote the next three-issue arc named Bloodlines.

As of City of Villains launch, the free comic book deal switched from being an actual comic book being mailed to you to being able to access all existing CoH comic books on the company's website. It's believed Cryptic did this not only to compensate for the lack of additional monthly fees for playing both CoH and CoV, but also to solve the problem of comic books getting lost in the mail. For a small additional fee (US$2 per issue), players could still get the actual comics sent by mail.

The comic was said to be converting from a monthly to bimonthly format after issue #15, however, due to various delays, issues 15 and 16 turned up in late November 2006, four months behind schedule. This run of the comic book ended at issue #20.
