= Vital Signs (Rush song) =

Single by Rush

from the album Moving Pictures
- B-side: "A Passage to Bangkok"; "In the Mood"
- Released: March 1981 (UK)
- Recorded: October–November 1980
- Studio: Le Studio, Morin Heights, Quebec
- Genre: Reggae rock; progressive rock; new wave
- Length: 4:43
- Label: Mercury
- Songwriters: Neil Peart; Geddy Lee; Alex Lifeson
- Producers: Rush; Terry Brown

Rush singles chronology
"Limelight" (1981)	"Vital Signs" (1981)	"Tom Sawyer (live)" (1981)

Music video
- "Vital Signs" on YouTube

"Vital Signs" is a song by progressive rock band Rush. It is the closing track from their eighth studio album Moving Pictures. The lyrics of the song are about individuality and the pressures of conforming.

The song is heavily influenced by reggae (in the guitar riff) as well as progressive electronica (in its use of sequencers) and the music of the Police. These influences continued in subsequent albums: Signals, Grace Under Pressure, and Power Windows.

The song was released as a single in the U.K. peaking at No 41. Also, a live version of "Vital Signs" appeared as the B-side to Rush's "New World Man" single in 1982 (Mercury #76179, US edition).

== Background ==
According to Geddy Lee, "Vital Signs" was directly influenced by one of the band's many imaginary groups they made up in-between takes at the studio, the new wave act The Fabulous Men.

== Composition ==
On "Vital Signs", Rush continued to explore the "white reggae" previously in the middle section of "The Spirit of Radio", which resulted from being influenced by The Police. The "forward-looking pulse" of "Vital Signs" represents the "adventurous" aspect of Moving Pictures' second side.

== Lyrics ==
"Vital Signs" is primarily about self-realization and tolerance. Will Romano, author of a 2023 book primarily about the Moving Pictures album, considered the choice of "Vital Signs" as a closing track important, as it saw the group embrace a new direction in their sound and style.

== Reception ==
Classic Rock readers voted "Vital Signs" the 37th best Rush song.

== See also ==
- List of Rush songs
