= Red Sector A =

Single by Rush

from the album Grace Under Pressure
- B-side: "Red Lenses"
- Released: May 1984
- Genre: Synth rock; progressive rock; dark wave; new wave
- Length: 5:09 (album version); 4:10 (single edit)
- Label: Anthem
- Songwriters: Neil Peart, Geddy Lee and Alex Lifeson
- Producers: Rush; Peter Henderson

Rush singles chronology
"The Body Electric" (1984)	"Red Sector A" (1984)	"Afterimage" (1984)

Music video
- "Red Sector A" on YouTube

"Red Sector A" is a song written and performed by Rush, from their 1984 album Grace Under Pressure. It provides a first-person account of a nameless protagonist living in an unspecified prison camp setting.

Lyricist Neil Peart has stated that the detailed imagery in the song intentionally evokes concentration camps of the Holocaust, although he left the lyrics ambiguous enough that they could deal with any similar prison camp scenario. The song was inspired in part by Geddy Lee's mother's accounts of the Holocaust.

In a rare instance for Rush's music, the track features no bass guitar, with Lee instead completely focusing on synthesizers and vocals.

== Background ==
Geddy Lee explained the genesis of the song in an interview:

The seeds for the song were planted nearly 60 years ago in April 1945 when British and Canadian soldiers liberated the Nazi concentration camp Bergen-Belsen. Lee's mother, Manya (now Mary) Rubenstein, was among the survivors. (His father, Morris Weinrib, was liberated from the Dachau concentration camp a few weeks later.) The whole album "Grace Under Pressure," says Lee, who was born Gary Lee Weinrib, "is about being on the brink and having the courage and strength to survive."

Though "Red Sector A," like much of the album from which it comes, is set in a bleak, apocalyptic future, what Lee calls "the psychology" of the song comes directly from a story his mother told him about the day she was liberated.

I once asked my mother her first thoughts upon being liberated," Lee says during a phone conversation. "She didn't believe [liberation] was possible. She didn't believe that if there was a society outside the camp how they could allow this to exist, so she believed society was done in."

In a 1984 interview Neil Peart describes writing "Red Sector A":

I read a first person account of someone who had survived the whole system of trains and work camps and Bergen-Belsen and all of that (...) through first person accounts from other people who came out at the end of it, always glad to be alive, which again was the essence of grace, grace under pressure is that through all of it, these people never gave up the strong will to survive, through the utmost horror, and total physical privations of all kinds.

...I wanted to take a little bit out of being specific and, and just describe the circumstances and try to look at the way people responded to it, and another really important and to me really moving image that I got from a lot of these accounts was that at the end of it, these people of course had been totally isolated from the rest of the world, from their families, from any news at all, and they, in cases that I read, believed that they were the last people surviving.

During Rush's Fifty Something tour on October 7th 2026 in Denver before performing Red Sector A, Geddy Lee dedicated the performance to his mother in reference to the 3rd anniversary of the October 7th attacks

== Song title ==
The song's title "Red Sector A" comes from the name of a NASA launch area at Kennedy Space Center, where the band watched the first launch of Space Shuttle Columbia on April 12, 1981. This trip also inspired the song "Countdown", from their previous album Signals.

== Track listing ==
No.	Title	Lyrics	Music	Length
1.	"Red Sector A"	Neil Peart	Geddy Lee, Alex Lifeson	5:09
2.	"Red Lenses"	Neil Peart	Lee, Lifeson	4:43

== See also ==
- List of songs recorded by Rush
- List of anti-war songs
