= Subdivisions (song) =

Single by Rush

from the album Signals
- B-side: "Red Barchetta" (live) (UK); "Countdown" (US)
- Released: October 22, 1982 (UK); December 1982 (US/Can)
- Recorded: 1981–1982
- Studio: Le Studio, Morin-Heights, Quebec, Canada
- Genre: Progressive rock; new wave
- Length: 5:34
- Label: Mercury
- Songwriter: Rush
- Producers: Rush, Terry Brown

Rush singles chronology
"New World Man" (1982)	"Subdivisions" (1982)	"Countdown" (1983)

Music video
- "Subdivisions" on YouTube

"Subdivisions" is a song by Canadian progressive rock group Rush, released as the second single from their 1982 album Signals.

The song was released as a single in 1982. In the United States, it charted at No. 5 on the Mainstream Rock Tracks chart.

== History ==
The development of "Subdivisions" began following the success of Rush's Moving Pictures (1981) album. The band began developing new material between tour dates, often using soundchecks to experiment with musical ideas. According to the guitarist Alex Lifeson, these sessions included informal writing exercises. He also recalled that some of these early ideas were captured on cassette and later shaped into completed songs. "Subdivisions" emerged from these jam sessions, with the lead vocalist Geddy Lee's synthesizer playing forming the song's foundation. This change in instrumentation had a structural impact on the band's dynamic. With Lee focusing on keyboards, the drummer Neil Peart and Lifeson effectively became a dedicated rhythm section, allowing them to "tune in to each other's parts" more directly. By late 1981, the band returned to Le Studio in Morin-Heights, Quebec to work on the live album Exit… Stage Left. It was during this time that Peart began working on the lyrics for "Subdivisions". He recalled hearing the initial musical concept outside, when Lee and Lifeson returned from the studio and played a demo for him on a portable cassette player.

"Subdivisions" was nearly complete by the time Rush previewed it live during the final leg of the Moving Pictures tour in the UK and the United States in late 1981. Bootleg recordings from those shows suggest that the guitar was more prominent in early versions. However, when the band resumed work on their next studio album Signals in the summer of 1982, the sound of "Subdivisions" shifted significantly. Lee's synthesizers were brought to the forefront, while Lifeson's guitar was scaled back in the mix. This change in instrumentation became a point of contention during the mixing process. Lifeson recalled feeling that the guitar was too low in the mix, noting that he raised the fader himself during the session, only for the producer Terry Brown to lower it again. Though Lifeson maintained that the song itself was strong, he disagreed with the balance of the final mix and stated that he continued to advocate for a stronger guitar presence for years after that.

== Composition ==
"Subdivisions"
Peart described "Subdivisions" as "hugely autobiographical" and noted its significance as Rush's first keyboard-based composition. Peart saw this as a pivotal development in the band's musical interplay.

"Subdivisions" reflects a stylistic shift for the band, particularly in its embrace of synthesizer-driven arrangements. This change reflected broader trends in popular music at the time. Synthesizers were becoming increasingly central in music, and Rush, particularly Lee, who referred to himself as a "synth geek", embraced the technology. Brown noted that the band was listening to groups like the Police and Ultravox during this period, which also influenced their musical direction. The song has been described as mixing progressive rock with new wave. According to Jason Heller of The A.V. Club, the song exemplifies the broader aesthetic change seen on Signals. Whereas Moving Pictures retained Rush's progressive rock traits, such as complex song structures and extended runtimes, Signals is described as "echoing and stark", with a more streamlined approach. Heller characterizes the new musical direction as "Moving Pictures reduced to Morse code", and sees "Subdivisions" as central to this transformation.

In "Subdivisions", the instrumentation is notably mechanistic. Lee, who handled both bass and synthesizer duties, drove the song's sonic direction with layered electronic textures. His vocals, described as having a "rarified warble", deliver Peart's lyrics in a manner that creates a sense of distance or abstraction. Peart's drumming is characterized by "geometric" precision, and his patterns are described as fluid and natural, providing contrast to the song's otherwise cold, synthesized soundscape. He highlighted the track's use of fluid time signature changes, calling it "challenging and always rewarding to play decently", particularly in a live setting. In addition to his drumming, Peart contributed a spoken vocal part, delivering the word "subdivisions" in a deep, authoritative tone during the chorus. In live performances, this line was typically handled by Lifeson while Peart remained focused on his drum kit. Lifeson's guitar presence in the track is relatively subdued. Heller notes that his playing, typically the most "organic" element of the trio, is "barely audible" in the mix. Lifeson felt that "Subdivisions" represented a tipping point where synthesizers began to overshadow the guitar.

Lyrically, "Subdivisions" marks a shift in Peart's songwriting focus, turning from the abstract and cosmic themes that had defined much of Rush's earlier output to a more grounded and personal subject: adolescence in the suburbs. According to Heller, the song reflects Peart's memories of growing up in Port Dalhousie, Ontario, and explores themes of conformity, alienation, and social division. Heller notes that while Peart had previously incorporated semi-autobiographical elements, such as in "Limelight", "Subdivisions" is unusually direct in tone. Though the song engages with a critical view of suburban life, Heller also points to a nostalgic dimension. He suggests that the lyrics may reflect an effort to preserve the frustrations of youth before they fade with time. Peart later described the song as "an exploration of the background from which all of us (and probably most of our audience) had sprung", referring to the members' shared upbringing in the suburbs of Toronto.

== Music video ==
The promotional video scenes were filmed in the Greater Toronto Area. The downtown scenes were filmed in downtown Toronto, most notably the opening zoom out shot of the intersection of King Street and Bay Street, while the suburbs scenes were filmed in Scarborough, near Warden and Finch Avenues. The aerial zoom out is of Sandy Haven Drive in Scarborough at the north east corner of Warden Avenue and McNicoll Avenue. The high school scenes were filmed at L'Amoreaux Collegiate Institute, in the same area. The video also features scenes of the Don Valley Parkway (with a GO train seen crossing in the foreground), Highway 401 (at the 404 interchange), and a busy PATH tunnel.

The lead character is played by Dave Glover, a L'Amoreaux student at the time.

The arcade game featured at the end of the video is Atari's Tempest. The video game arcade was a real arcade, not staged, and named Video Invasion. It was located at 3500 Bathurst Street in North York. It is just a few kilometers from Willowdale, the neighborhood of North York mentioned in "The Necromancer". Most famously, Brian May of Queen frequented the arcade; further, there were pictures of him on the wall.

== Reception ==
"Subdivisions" was one of five Rush songs inducted into the Canadian Songwriters Hall of Fame on 28 March 2010. The band asked Jacob Moon to perform his version of the song at the gala in their absence.

Classic Rock ranked the song number 6 on their list of "The 50 Greatest Rush Songs Ever".

Rolling Stone readers voted the song number 10 on "The 10 Best Rush Songs", writing that the song's music video had "the look and feel of an early episode of Degrassi High".

Ultimate Classic Rock ranked the song number 9 on their list of "Top 10 Rush Songs".

== Personnel ==
- Geddy Lee – lead and backing vocals, synthesizers (Oberheim OB-X, Minimoog), bass guitar
- Alex Lifeson – electric guitar, backing vocals
- Neil Peart – drums, spoken vocal

== Charts ==
Chart performance for "Subdivisions"
Chart (1982–1983)	Peak position
Canada Top Singles (RPM)	36
UK Singles (Official Charts)	53
US Mainstream Rock (Billboard)	5
