= New World Man =

Single by Rush

from the album Signals
- B-side: "Vital Signs" (live)
- Released: August 27, 1982
- Genre: New wave; synth-pop
- Length: 3:43
- Label: Mercury
- Songwriters: Neil Peart; Geddy Lee; Alex Lifeson
- Producers: Rush; Terry Brown

Rush singles chronology
"Closer to the Heart (live)" (1982)	"New World Man" (1982)	"Subdivisions" (1982)

Music video
- "New World Man" (visualizer) on YouTube

"New World Man" is a hit single from the 1982 album Signals by Canadian rock band Rush. The song was the last and most quickly composed song on the album, stemming from a suggestion by then-Rush producer Terry Brown to even out the lengths of the two sides of the cassette version. It went to No. 1 (on the RPM national singles chart) in Canada, where it remained for two weeks in October 1982. It was the only single by a Canadian act to top the RPM chart that year.

In the United States, it became Rush's highest charting single and it remains Rush's only American top 40 hit, peaking at No. 21 on the Billboard singles chart in October and November 1982. On the Cashbox Top 100, it peaked at No. 35. It also hit No. 1 on the Billboard Top Tracks chart (the first Rush single to do so).

"New World Man" reached No. 42 in the United Kingdom. A remixed version (released as a double A-side with "Countdown") later reached No. 36 in the UK in early 1983.

Cash Box said that "synth blips pave the way for this pulsing change of pace" for Rush, with "a more compact, almost Police-like drive." Billboard said that it may give Rush a hit single due to its "hypnotic synthesizer pop with flashes of guitar rock."

== See also ==
- List of songs recorded by Rush
- List of number-one singles of 1982 (Canada)
- List of Billboard Mainstream Rock number-one songs of the 1980s
