= R30: 30th Anniversary World Tour =

Video by Rush
- Released: November 22, 2005
- Recorded: September 24, 2004
- Venue: Festhalle Frankfurt (Frankfurt am Main)
- Genre: Hard rock; progressive rock; heavy metal
- Length: ≈130:00
- Label: Anthem, Atlantic, Eagle Vision (for the Blu-ray edition)
- Director: Pierre Lamoureux

Rush chronology
Feedback (2004)	R30: 30th Anniversary World Tour (2005)	Gold (2006)

Professional ratings
Review scores
Source	Rating
AllMusic	4/5 stars
The Encyclopedia of Popular Music	3/5 stars
Mojo	3/5 stars
The Rolling Stone Album Guide	3/5 stars

R30: 30th Anniversary World Tour is a live DVD by the Canadian rock band Rush, released on November 22, 2005 in Canada and the US, and November 28, 2005 in Europe. The DVD documents the band's R30: 30th Anniversary Tour, and was recorded on September 24, 2004 at the Festhalle Frankfurt, Germany.

The DVD was released in both a standard and a deluxe set. The standard set includes a DVD of the concert, a second DVD of various interviews/extra live footage/easter eggs, and a booklet of album and band photos. The deluxe edition set includes all the items in the standard edition, as well as two CDs of the DVD content, two limited-edition guitar picks, a souvenir backstage pass, and exclusive slipcase packaging. The CDs are only available in the deluxe edition set. The guitar picks have Alex Lifeson's and Geddy Lee's signatures printed on them, and come in red, yellow, and black colors, which are random in packages.

To reduce overlap with the band's 2003 release Rush in Rio, eight songs were cut from both DVD versions: "Bravado", "YYZ", "The Trees", "One Little Victory", "Secret Touch", "Red Sector A", "La Villa Strangiato", and By-Tor and the Snow Dog". The audio CDs in the deluxe version present the shortened set-list as well. Five of the deleted songs were later released:

- "Red Sector A" on the Snakes & Arrows Live DVD (2008)
- "Secret Touch" on the DVD included with the two-disc version of the Retrospective III: 1989–2008 compilation (2009)
- "One Little Victory" on the DVD included with the two-disc version of the Working Men compilation (2009)
- "Bravado" and "YYZ" as bonus features for the home media release of the documentary film Rush: Beyond the Lighted Stage (2010)

The R30 track "Der Trommler" is a drum solo by Neil Peart. The track "R30 Overture" is an instrumental medley of six early Rush songs, one from each of the first six studio albums, with flashes of the band's history appearing in the background at the concerts. The R30 releases also feature four songs from the band's 2004 "cover" EP Feedback. The tour ultimately featured at least one song from every one of their albums up until that point, except Caress of Steel (beyond the snippet of "Bastille Day" as part of the R30 Overture) and Presto.

A Blu-ray version of R30, containing the complete concert, was released on December 8, 2009 in the US, and in late 2013 in Europe.

== Track listing ==
=== DVD disc 1 ===
1. "R30 Overture" - ("Finding My Way"/"Anthem"/"Bastille Day"/"A Passage to Bangkok"/"Cygnus X-1 Book I: The Voyage, Book II: Hemispheres - Prelude")
2. "The Spirit of Radio"
3. "Force Ten"
4. "Animate"
5. "Subdivisions"
6. "Earthshine"
7. "Red Barchetta"
8. "Roll the Bones"
9. "The Seeker"
10. "Tom Sawyer"
11. "Dreamline"
12. "Between the Wheels"
13. "Mystic Rhythms"
14. "Der Trommler" (Neil Peart's drum solo)
15. "Resist" (the acoustic arrangement first heard on Rush in Rio)
16. "Heart Full of Soul"
17. "2112" ("Overture"/"Temples of Syrinx"/"Grand Finale")
18. "Xanadu" (abbreviated version)
19. "Working Man"
20. "Summertime Blues"
21. "Crossroads"
22. "Limelight"

Running Time: 2 hours 10 minutes

=== DVD disc 2 ===
1. 1979: Interview with Geddy Lee at Ivor Wynne Stadium – Tour of the Hemispheres (10:00)
2. 1979: Interview at Le Studio recording studio in Quebec featuring all three members together, on the making of the Permanent Waves album (13:00)
3. 1990: Juno Awards Artist of the Decade interviews (1980s) featuring all three members separately (15:34)
4. 1994: CBC Television: Juno Awards news report - Induction of Rush into the Canadian Music Hall of Fame, presented by Tom Cochrane (17:33)
5. 2002: Interview with Geddy Lee and Alex Lifeson for the release of the album Vapor Trails (12:51)
6. "Fly by Night" - Church Session Video (1975)
7. "Finding My Way" - from the band's appearance on Don Kirshner's Rock Concert (1975)
8. "In the Mood" - Same performance as above
9. "Circumstances"
10. "La Villa Strangiato"
11. "A Farewell to Kings" - Seneca College Theatre (1977)
12. "Xanadu" - Seneca College Theatre (1977)
13. "The Spirit of Radio" - sound check at Ivor Wynne Stadium (1979)
14. "Freewill" - Toronto Rocks festival performance (2003)
15. "Closer to the Heart" - Canadian Tsunami Disaster Fund charity telethon performance on CBC Television, with Ed Robertson of the Barenaked Ladies and Mike Smith in character as Bubbles of the Trailer Park Boys (2005)
16. 1988: Rush hits St. John's (Easter egg) - Interviews with Geddy Lee and fans prior to a Rush concert in St. John's
17. 1990: Alex's Interview for Artist of the Decade (1980s) (Easter egg) - Outtakes from Alex Lifeson's Artist of the Decade interview

Running Time: 2 hours 8 minutes

=== CD disc 1 ===
1. "R30 Overture" – ("Finding My Way", "Anthem", "Bastille Day", "A Passage to Bangkok", "Cygnus X-1", "Hemispheres") – 6:42
2. "The Spirit of Radio" – 5:05
3. "Force Ten" – 4:49
4. "Animate" – 5:49
5. "Subdivisions" – 6:09
6. "Earthshine" – 5:41
7. "Red Barchetta" – 6:49
8. "Roll the Bones" – 6:22
9. "The Seeker" – 3:27
10. "Tom Sawyer" – 5:00
11. "Dreamline" – 5:20

Running Time: 61:19

=== CD disc 2 ===
1. "Between the Wheels" – 6:17
2. "Mystic Rhythms" – 5:22
3. "Der Trommler" – 9:01
4. "Resist" – 4:33
5. "Heart Full of Soul" – 2:44
6. "2112" ("Overture"/"Temples of Syrinx"/"Grand Finale") – 8:24
7. "Xanadu" (abbreviated version) – 6:44
8. "Working Man" – 6:14
9. "Summertime Blues" – 3:41
10. "Crossroads" – 3:13
11. "Limelight" – 4:57

Running Time: 61:13

=== Blu-Ray disc ===
1. "R30 Overture" – ("Finding My Way", "Anthem", "Bastille Day", "A Passage to Bangkok", "Cygnus X-1", "Hemispheres")
2. "The Spirit of Radio"
3. "Force Ten"
4. "Animate"
5. "Subdivisions"
6. "Earthshine"
7. "Red Barchetta"
8. "Roll the Bones"
9. "Bravado" (previously unreleased)
10. "YYZ" (previously unreleased)
11. "The Trees" (previously unreleased)
12. "The Seeker"
13. "One Little Victory" (previously unreleased)
14. "Tom Sawyer"
15. "Dreamline"
16. "Secret Touch" (previously unreleased)
17. "Between the Wheels"
18. "Mystic Rhythms"
19. "Red Sector A" (previously unreleased)
20. "Der Trommler"
21. "Resist"
22. "Heart Full of Soul"
23. "2112" ("Overture"/"Temples of Syrinx"/"Grand Finale")
24. "La Villa Strangiato" (previously unreleased)
25. "By-Tor and the Snow Dog" (previously unreleased)
26. "Xanadu" (abbreviated version)
27. "Working Man"
28. "Summertime Blues"
29. "Crossroads"
30. "Limelight"

Full concert running time: 182 minutes
plus the extra features of the second DVD (127 minutes)

== Personnel ==
- Geddy Lee – bass and acoustic guitars, keyboards, vocals
- Alex Lifeson – electric and acoustic guitars, bass pedal synth
- Neil Peart – drums, percussion

== Certifications ==
Region	Certification	Certified units/sales
Canada (Music Canada)	8× Platinum	80,000^{^}
United Kingdom (BPI)	Gold	25,000^{^}
United States (RIAA)	5× Platinum	500,000^{^}
^{^} Shipments figures based on certification alone.
