= The Studio Albums 1989–2007 =

Box set by Rush
- Released: September 30, 2013
- Recorded: 1988–2006
- Genres: Progressive rock, hard rock, heavy metal
- Length: 364:50/6 hours and 5 minutes
- Labels: Anthem, Atlantic

The Studio Albums 1989–2007 is a box set by the Canadian rock band Rush. It contains the band's seven studio albums released from 1989 to 2007 and was released on 7 CDs on September 30, 2013. The albums are Presto (1989), Roll the Bones (1991), Counterparts (1993), Test for Echo (1996), the 2013 remix of Vapor Trails (2002), Feedback (2004) and Snakes & Arrows (2007).

There is also a booklet included with lyrics to every album, with the exception of Feedback.

== Reception ==
Professional ratings
Review scores
Source	Rating
AllMusic	4/5 stars

Gregory Heaney of AllMusic gave the box set 4 out of 5 stars. He said that of most interest to Rush fans in the box set will be the remixed version of Vapor Trails.

== Track listing ==
=== Presto (1989) ===
All lyrics are written by Neil Peart; all music is composed by Alex Lifeson and Geddy Lee.

Side one
No.	Title	Length
1.	"Show Don't Tell"	5:01
2.	"Chain Lightning"	4:33
3.	"The Pass"	4:52
4.	"War Paint"	5:24
5.	"Scars"	4:07
6.	"Presto"	5:45
7.	"Superconductor"	4:47
8.	"Anagram (For Mongo)"	4:00
9.	"Red Tide"	4:29
10.	"Hand over Fist"	4:11
11.	"Available Light"	5:03
Total length:		52:11

=== Roll the Bones (1991) ===
All lyrics are written by Neil Peart; all music is composed by Alex Lifeson and Geddy Lee.

No.	Title	Length
1.	"Dreamline"	4:37
2.	"Bravado"	4:35
3.	"Roll the Bones"	5:30
4.	"Face Up"	3:54
5.	"Where's My Thing? (Part IV, "Gangster of Boats" Trilogy) (instrumental)"	3:49
6.	"The Big Wheel"	5:13
7.	"Heresy"	5:27
8.	"Ghost of a Chance"	5:18
9.	"Neurotica"	4:39
10.	"You Bet Your Life"	5:01
Total length:		48:04

=== Counterparts (1993) ===
All lyrics are written by Neil Peart, except "Between Sun & Moon" co-written by Pye Dubois; all music is composed by Alex Lifeson and Geddy Lee.

No.	Title	Length
1.	"Animate"	6:04
2.	"Stick It Out"	4:30
3.	"Cut to the Chase"	4:48
4.	"Nobody's Hero"	4:55
5.	"Between Sun & Moon"	4:37
6.	"Alien Shore"	5:47
7.	"The Speed of Love"	5:02
8.	"Double Agent"	4:52
9.	"Leave That Thing Alone" (instrumental)	4:05
10.	"Cold Fire"	4:27
11.	"Everyday Glory"	5:11
Total length:		54:24

=== Test for Echo (1996) ===
All tracks are written by Geddy Lee, Alex Lifeson, and Neil Peart, except "Test for Echo" written by Lee, Lifeson, Peart, and Pye Dubois.

No.	Title	Length
1.	"Test for Echo"	5:56
2.	"Driven"	4:27
3.	"Half the World"	3:43
4.	"The Color of Right"	4:48
5.	"Time and Motion"	5:01
6.	"Totem"	4:58
7.	"Dog Years"	4:55
8.	"Virtuality"	5:44
9.	"Resist"	4:23
10.	"Limbo" (instrumental)	5:29
11.	"Carve Away the Stone"	4:06
Total length:		53:31

=== Vapor Trails (2002) [2013 remixed version] ===
All lyrics are written by Neil Peart; all music is composed by Alex Lifeson and Geddy Lee.

No.	Title	Length
1.	"One Little Victory"	5:08
2.	"Ceiling Unlimited"	5:28
3.	"Ghost Rider"	5:41
4.	"Peaceable Kingdom"	5:23
5.	"The Stars Look Down"	4:28
6.	"How It Is"	4:05
7.	"Vapor Trail"	4:57
8.	"Secret Touch"	6:34
9.	"Earthshine"	5:38
10.	"Sweet Miracle"	3:40
11.	"Nocturne"	4:49
12.	"Freeze (Part IV of "Fear")"	6:21
13.	"Out of the Cradle"	5:03
Total length:		67:15

=== Feedback (2004) ===
No.	Title	Writer(s)	Original Artist/Inspiration	Length
1.	"Summertime Blues"	Eddie Cochran/Jerry Capehart	Eddie Cochran, Blue Cheer, The Who	3:43
2.	"Heart Full of Soul"	Graham Gouldman	The Yardbirds	2:52
3.	"For What It's Worth"	Stephen Stills	Buffalo Springfield	3:30
4.	"The Seeker"	Pete Townshend	The Who	3:27
5.	"Mr. Soul"	Neil Young	Buffalo Springfield	3:51
6.	"Seven and Seven Is"	Arthur Lee	Love	2:53
7.	"Shapes of Things"	Paul Samwell-Smith/Keith Relf/Jim McCarty	The Yardbirds	3:16
8.	"Crossroads"	Robert Johnson	Robert Johnson, Cream	3:27
Total length:				27:08

=== Snakes & Arrows (2007) ===
All lyrics are written by Neil Peart; all music is composed by Geddy Lee and Alex Lifeson, except "Hope" by Lifeson.

No.	Title	Length
1.	"Far Cry"	5:21
2.	"Armor and Sword"	6:36
3.	"Workin' Them Angels"	4:47
4.	"The Larger Bowl"	4:07
5.	"Spindrift"	5:24
6.	"The Main Monkey Business" (instrumental)	6:01
7.	"The Way the Wind Blows"	6:28
8.	"Hope" (instrumental)	2:03
9.	"Faithless"	5:31
10.	"Bravest Face"	5:12
11.	"Good News First"	4:51
12.	"Malignant Narcissism" (instrumental)	2:17
13.	"We Hold On"	4:13
Total length:		62:50
