= List of awards and nominations received by Rush =

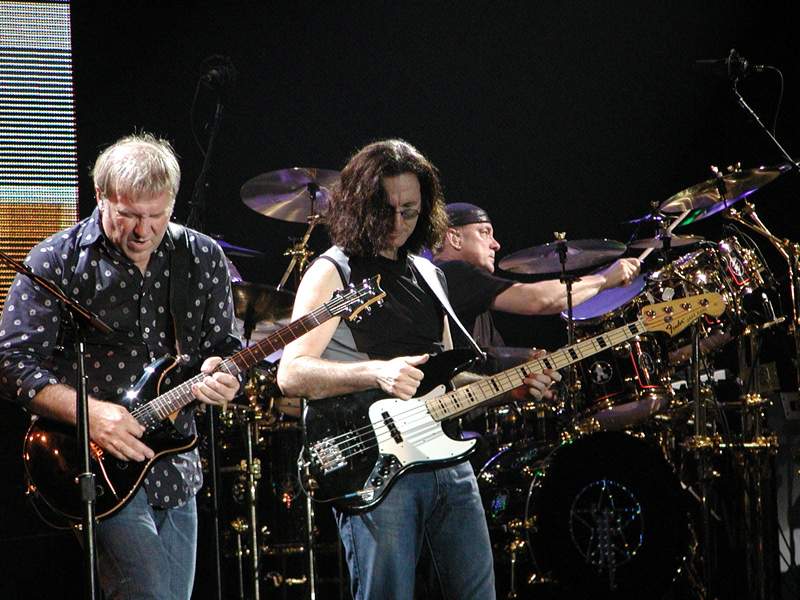
Alex Lifeson, Geddy Lee and Neil Peart of Rush in concert 2004

The Canadian rock band Rush has received many awards throughout its career. Individually, the members of Rush have been recognized for their instrumental abilities through various magazine publications and polls. In recognition of the band as a whole, awards include various Junos, Grammy nominations, topping miscellaneous Canadian music polls, and induction into the Canadian Songwriters Hall of Fame, and American Rock and Roll Hall of Fame.

== Juno Awards for Rush ==
- 1975 Most promising group of the year
- 1978 Group of the year
- 1979 Group of the year
- 1990 Artist of the Decade (80's)
- 1991 Best Hard Rock/Metal album – Presto
- 1992 Hard Rock album of the year – Roll the Bones
- 2004 Music DVD of the year – Rush in Rio
- 2011 Music DVD of the year – Rush: Beyond the Lighted Stage
- 2012 Rock Album of the year – Clockwork Angels

== Grammy nominations ==
- 1981 nomination for Best Rock Instrumental Performance
  - "YYZ" — lost to The Police's "Behind My Camel"
- 1992 nomination for Best Rock Instrumental Performance
  - "Where's My Thing?" — lost to Eric Johnson's "Cliffs of Dover"
- 1995 nomination for Best Rock Instrumental Performance
  - "Leave That Thing Alone" — lost to Pink Floyd's "Marooned"
- 2004 nomination for Best Rock Instrumental Performance
  - "O Baterista" from Rush In Rio — lost to Brian Wilson's "Mrs. O'Leary's Cow"
- 2008 nomination for Best Rock Instrumental Performance
  - "Malignant Narcissism" from Snakes & Arrows — lost to Bruce Springsteen's "Once Upon a Time in the West"
- 2009 nomination for Best Rock Instrumental Performance
  - "Hope (Live For The Art Of Peace)" from Songs for Tibet: The Art of Peace — lost to Zappa Plays Zappa's "Peaches en Regalia" (featuring Steve Vai and Napoleon Murphy Brock)
- 2011 nomination for Best Music Video Long Form
  - Rush: Beyond The Lighted Stage — lost to The Doors When You're Strange documentary

== Miscellaneous awards ==
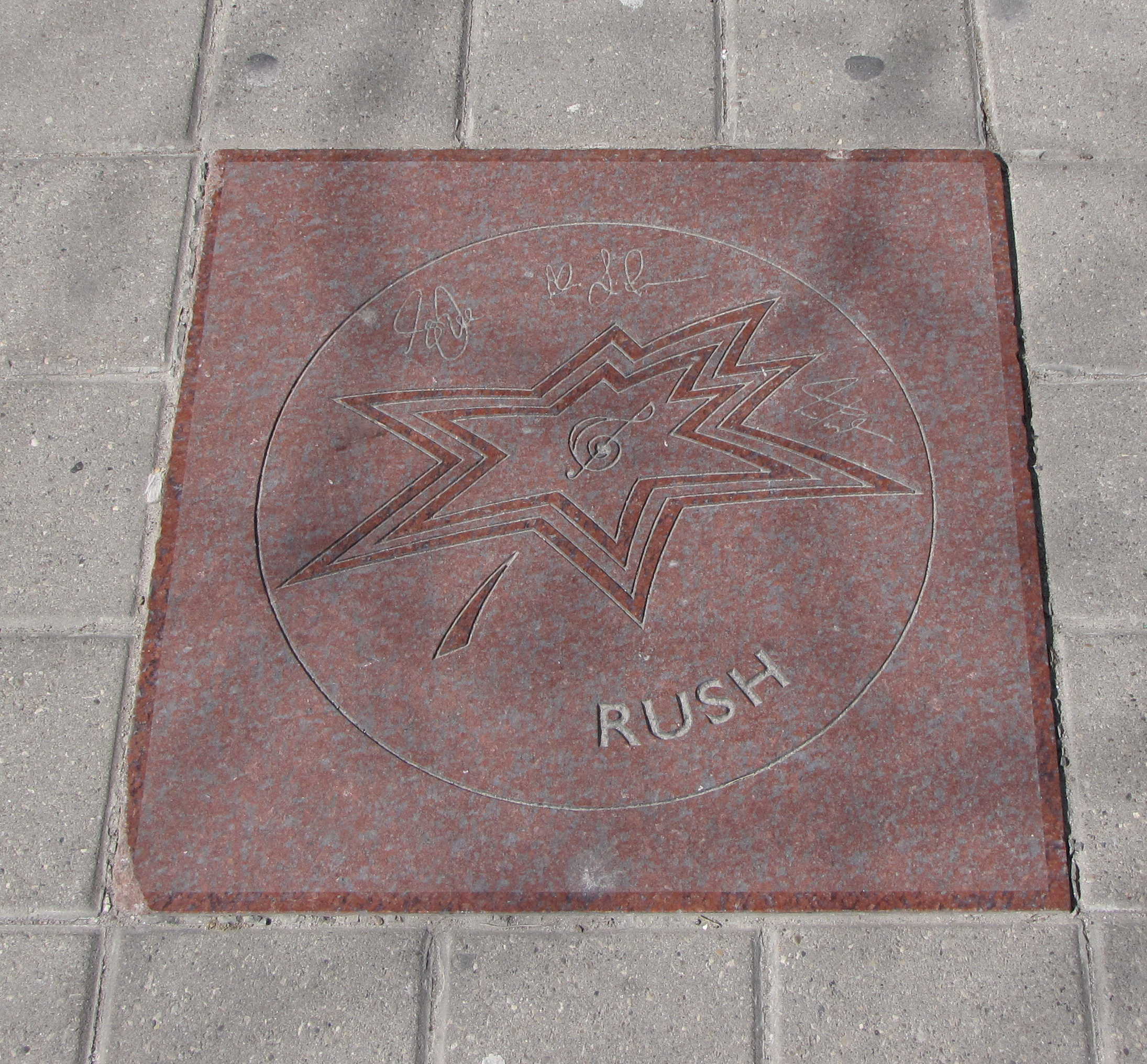
Rush's star on Canada's Walk of Fame

- December 1990 – Rush wins Mayor's Award at the Toronto Music Awards.
- October 1992 – Rush is a recipient of the Harold Moon Award by the Society of Composers, Authors, and Music Publishers of Canada (SOCAN).
- May 1993 – Rush is inducted into the Harvard Lampoon and named "Musicians Of The Millennium".
- October 1993 – Rush is a recipient of the Toronto Arts Award.
- March 1994 – Rush inducted into the Canadian Music Hall of Fame.
- May 1996 – Lee, Lifeson, and Peart are made Officers of the Order of Canada, the first rock musicians so honored.
- December 1996 – Performance magazine, a publication for the touring industry, nominated Rush as "Rock Act of the Year" for their 1996 Performance Readers Poll Awards.
- May 1997 – The Foundation Forum and F Musicfest have announced Rush this year's recipient of the "Concrete/Foundations Outstanding Contribution to Music Award. Rush joins a distinguished list of receipts including Van Halen, Kiss, Ozzy Osbourne and Alice Cooper.
- May 1999 – Rush inducted into Canada's Walk of Fame in Toronto.
- 2000 - Rush ranked #28 on VH-1's list of the 100 Greatest Artists of Hard Rock
- January 2000 – Rush has topped JAM! Music's online poll, which determines them "Best Canadian Musicians of All Time".
- 2003 – Inducted into the CMW Canadian Music Industry Hall of Fame.
- 2009 – The song "Tom Sawyer" ranked number 19 on VH1's "100 Greatest Hard Rock Songs".
- March 28, 2010 – Rush inducted into the Canadian Songwriter's Hall of Fame.
- June 25, 2010 – Rush received a star on the Hollywood Walk of Fame, located at 6752 Hollywood Boulevard.
- December 30, 2011 – Rush received Best Live Act of the Year award, Planet Rock.
- March 6, 2012 – Rush is given the Governor General's Performing Arts Award for lifetime achievement.
- April 18, 2013 – Rush joins the Rock 'n' Roll Hall of Fame
- 2014 - Rush receives honorary Doctor of Music degrees from Nipissing University.

== Magazine awards ==
=== Geddy Lee ===
- Bass Hall of Fame – Guitar Player Magazine
- 6-time winner: "Best Rock Bass" – Guitar Player Magazine
- 1993 – "Best Rock Bass Player" Bass Player readers' poll
- Best Album for Bass (Snakes & Arrows) – Bass Player Magazine
- "Coolest Bass Line In A Song" (for "Malignant Narcissism") – Bass Player Magazine
- "Best 2007 Cover Feature" for "Northern Warrior" – Bass Player Magazine

=== Alex Lifeson ===
- "Best Rock Talent" by Guitar for the Practicing Musician in 1983
- "Best Rock Guitarist" by Guitar Player in 1984 and 2008
- Runner-up for "Best Rock Guitarist" in Guitar Player in 1982, 1983, 1985, 1986
- Inducted into the Guitar for the Practicing Musician Hall of Fame, 1991
- Most Ferociously Brilliant Guitar Album (Snakes & Arrows) – Guitar Player 2007
- "Best Article" for "Different Strings" – Guitar Player September 2007

=== Neil Peart ===
Peart has received the following awards in the Modern Drummer magazine reader's poll:

- Hall of Fame: 1983
- Best Rock Drummer: 1980, 1981, 1982, 1983, 1984, 1985, 1986, 2006, 2008
- Best Multi-Percussionist: 1983, 1984, 1985, 1986
- Best Percussion Instrumentalist: 1982
- Most Promising New Drummer: 1980
- Best All Around: 1986
- 1986 Honor Roll: Rock Drummer, Multi-Percussion

(As a member of the Honor Roll in these categories, he is no longer eligible for votes in the above categories.)

- Best Instructional Video: 2006, for Anatomy of A Drum Solo
- Best Drum Recording of the 1980s, 2007, for "YYZ" from Exit...Stage Left
- Best Recorded Performance:
  - 1980: Permanent Waves
  - 1981: Moving Pictures
  - 1982: Exit...Stage Left
  - 1983: Signals
  - 1985: Grace Under Pressure
  - 1986: Power Windows
  - 1988: Hold Your Fire
  - 1989: A Show of Hands
  - 1990: Presto
  - 1992: Roll the Bones
  - 1993: Counterparts
  - 1997: Test for Echo
  - 1999: Different Stages
  - 2002: Vapor Trails
  - 2004: R30
  - 2007: Snakes and Arrows

Peart has received the following awards from DRUM! magazine for 2007:

- Drummer of the Year
- Best Progressive Rock Drummer
- Best Live Performer
- Best DVD (Anatomy of A Drum Solo)
- Best Drumming Album (Snakes & Arrows)

Peart received the following awards from DRUM! magazine for 2008:

- Drummer of the Year
- Best Progressive Rock Drummer (Runner-Up)
- Best Mainstream Pop Drummer (Runner-Up)
- Best Live Drumming Performer

Peart received the following awards from DRUM! magazine for 2009:

- Drummer Of The Year
- Best Progressive Rock Drummer

Peart received the following awards from DRUM! magazine for 2010:

- Drummer of the Year
- Best Live Performer (Runner-Up)
- Best Progressive Rock Drummer (Runner-Up)
