= Rush in Rio (video) =

Video by Rush
- Released: 2003
- Recorded: 23 November 2002
- Venue: Maracanã Stadium (Rio de Janeiro)
- Genre: Progressive rock, hard rock
- Label: Anthem/Zoë Vision
- Director: Daniel E. Catullo III
- Producer: Daniel E. Catullo III, Lawrence Jordan, Lionel Pasamonte

Rush chronology
| A Show of Hands (1989) | Rush in Rio (2003) | R30: 30th Anniversary World Tour (2005) |

Rush in Rio is a live DVD by Canadian band Rush, released in 2003. It is also available as a three CD set. It was the first concert DVD ever released by the band, consisting of 29 songs, and is available in both one-disc and two-disc sets. Bonus features in the two-disc set include a behind-the-scenes tour documentary directed by Andrew MacNaughtan and multi-angle viewing options for three instrumentals. The performance was recorded and filmed at Maracanã Stadium in Rio de Janeiro, Brazil and was the final night on the 2002 Vapor Trails Tour. It is the band's first live video that presents a single night's entire performance.

The attendance at this show was 40,000, the second largest crowd at a show on the Vapor Trails Tour (the largest crowd being 60,000 at the previous night's show in São Paulo).

The crew had such a difficult time driving from São Paulo to Rio de Janeiro that they were hours late when they arrived at the stadium, and no sound or video check was done because the crowd was entering by the time everything was set up. After this show, Neil Peart's rotating drum riser was destroyed when it was being removed from the stadium by a flat-bed truck whose driver miscalculated the height of the exit. During the final three shows of the tour, all in Brazil, the Vapor Trails carpet spread out on the stage became so soaked with rainwater that it could not be flown out with the rest of the equipment afterward. It was left behind in Rio and eventually sold on eBay to a fan in Connecticut.

The Rush In Rio DVD received the 2004 Juno Award for "Music DVD of the Year."

== Track listing ==
=== Disc 1 ===
1. "Tom Sawyer" – 5:04
2. "Distant Early Warning" – 4:50
3. "New World Man" – 4:04
4. "Roll the Bones" – 6:15
5. "Earthshine" – 5:44
6. "YYZ" – 4:56
7. "The Pass" – 4:52
8. "Bravado" – 6:18
9. "The Big Money" – 6:03
10. "The Trees" – 5:12
11. "Freewill" – 5:48
12. "Closer to the Heart" – 3:04
13. "Natural Science" – 8:34
14. "One Little Victory" – 5:32
15. "Driven" – 5:22
16. "Ghost Rider" – 5:36
17. "Secret Touch" – 7:00
18. "Dreamline" – 5:10
19. "Red Sector A" – 5:16
20. "Leave That Thing Alone" – 4:59
21. "O Baterista" (drum solo) – 8:54
22. "Resist" – 4:23
23. "2112 Overture/The Temples of Syrinx" – 6:52
24. "Limelight" – 4:29
25. "La Villa Strangiato" – 10:05
26. "The Spirit of Radio" – 5:28

Encore:

1. "By-Tor and the Snow Dog" – 4:34
2. "Cygnus X-1" – 3:12
3. "Working Man" – 5:48

All three of these tracks are played as a medley.

=== Disc 2 ===
The Documentary: The Boys in Brazil

MX Multiangle Songs:

1. "YYZ"
2. "O Baterista"
3. "La Villa Strangiato"

Easter eggs:

1. Animated rear screen footage during "By-Tor and the Snow Dog"
2. "Anthem" (Church Session Video, 1975)

== Personnel ==
=== Band members ===
- Geddy Lee - vocals, bass guitar, synthesizers, acoustic guitar on "Resist"
- Alex Lifeson - electric and acoustic guitars, backing vocals
- Neil Peart - drums and percussion

=== Production ===
- Daniel E. Catullo III - director, producer
- Andrew MacNaughtan - director of "The Boys in Brazil"
- Lawrence Jordan, Lionel Pasamonte - producers
- Ray Danniels, Pegi Cecconi, Bryan Domyan - executive producers
- Allan Weinrib - executive producer, producer of "The Boys in Brazil"
- Glenis S. Gross, Tilton Gardner, Robert McClaugherty - co-executive producers
- Michael J. Schultz, Alberto Magno - Brazilian producers
- Ted Kenney - line producer
- James 'Jimbo' Barton - audio producer

== Certifications ==
| Region | Certification | Certified units/sales |
|---|---|---|
| Canada (Music Canada) | Diamond | 100,000^{^} |
| United Kingdom (BPI) | Platinum | 50,000^{^} |
| United States (RIAA) | 7× Platinum | 700,000^{^} |
^{^} Shipments figures based on certification alone.
