= Retrospective III: 1989–2008 =

Compilation album by Rush
- Released: March 3, 2009
- Recorded: 1989–2008
- Genre: Progressive rock, hard rock
- Length: 71:50
- Label: Anthem (Canada); Atlantic
- Producer: Rush, Nick Raskulinecz, Peter Collins, Rupert Hine, Paul Northfield

Rush chronology
Snakes & Arrows Live (2008)	Retrospective III: 1989–2008 (2009)	Grace Under Pressure Tour (2009)

Professional ratings
Review scores
Source	Rating
Allmusic	4/5 stars
Mojo	3/5 stars
Record Collector	5/5 stars
Rolling Stone	2.5/5 stars
Sea of Tranquility	4/5 stars

Retrospective III: 1989–2008 is a compilation album by Canadian rock band Rush released on March 3, 2009. The album is a collection of songs from the third and fourth decades of the band (1989–2008), which they spent signed to Atlantic Records. The album is available in two versions. The 2-disc version includes a DVD of music and live videos.

== Album artwork ==
Retrospective III: 1989–2008 displays the covers of six albums – Vapor Trails, Test for Echo, Counterparts, Roll the Bones, Presto, and alternate artwork for Snakes & Arrows – on the wall, while that of the Feedback EP rests on the floor. The Snakes & Arrows art, designed by Hugh Syme, was originally used on that album's insert and later appeared on the cover of the Snakes & Arrows Live album; the portion featuring the battered road sign was used for the DVD version. The dog from the cover of Signals sits looking up at the covers, and the pushbroom used by the janitor on the covers of the Retrospective I, Retrospective II, and Gold compilations rests against the wall. The dog appears on the Gold cover as well, but is not present on the other two Retrospective album covers.

== Content ==
All the songs included with the album were taken from the band's albums recorded with Atlantic Records (with the exception of their cover EP Feedback): Presto, Roll the Bones, Counterparts, Test for Echo, Vapor Trails, and Snakes & Arrows. The album also features remixes of the two tracks from Vapor Trails, which were done to correct mastering problems associated with the album. This is the only Retrospective collection to feature live material, in the form of the song "Ghost of a Chance (Live version)". This version is notable for not being previously available on any other Rush release.

== Track listing ==
=== Disc 1 (CD) ===
No.	Title	Original release	Length
1.	"One Little Victory" (Remix)	Vapor Trails (2002)	5:11
2.	"Dreamline"	Roll the Bones (1991)	4:39
3.	"Workin' Them Angels"	Snakes & Arrows (2007)	4:48
4.	"Presto"	Presto (1989)	5:48
5.	"Bravado"	Roll the Bones	4:38
6.	"Driven"	Test for Echo (1996)	4:29
7.	"The Pass"	Presto	4:53
8.	"Animate"	Counterparts (1993)	6:05
9.	"Roll the Bones"	Roll the Bones	5:32
10.	"Ghost of a Chance" (Live)	Previously unreleased (2008) (Roll the Bones)	5:51
11.	"Nobody's Hero"	Counterparts	4:56
12.	"Leave That Thing Alone"	Counterparts	4:08
13.	"Earthshine" (Remix)	Vapor Trails	5:38
14.	"Far Cry"	Snakes & Arrows	5:18
Total length:			71:54

=== Disc 2 (DVD) ===
(directors in parentheses)

1. "Stick It Out" (Samuel Bayer)
2. "Nobody's Hero" (Dale Heslip)
3. "Half the World" (Dale Heslip)
4. "Driven" (Dale Heslip)
5. "Roll the Bones" (Chris Painter)
6. "Show Don't Tell" (Doug Freel)
7. "The Pass" (Matt Mahurin)
8. "Superconductor" (Gerald Casale)
9. "Far Cry" (Christopher Mills)
10. "Malignant Narcissism" (Bobby Standridge)
11. "The Seeker" (live) (Pierre Lamoureux) (originally from Feedback (2004))
12. "Secret Touch" (live) (Pierre Lamoureux) (originally from Vapor Trails)
13. "Resist" (live) (Pierre Lamoureux) (originally from Test for Echo)

Bonus material: interview and "Tom Sawyer" (live) (Jim Hoskinson)

==== Song origins ====
- Tracks 6, 7, 8 from Presto.
- Track 5 from Roll the Bones.
- Tracks 1, 2 from Counterparts.
- Tracks 3, 4 from Test for Echo.
- Tracks 11, 13 from R30 (2005).
- Track 12 previously unreleased, recorded on the R30 tour at the Festhalle Frankfurt (September 24, 2004).
- Tracks 9, 10 from Snakes & Arrows.
- Bonus track from The Colbert Report (episode dated July 16, 2008).

== Personnel ==
- Geddy Lee – bass guitars, synthesizers, vocals
- Alex Lifeson – electric and acoustic guitars, synthesizers
- Neil Peart – drums, percussion, electronic percussion, lyricist

== See also ==
- Retrospective I
- Retrospective II
- Gold
