= Working Men =

Compilation album by Rush
- Released: November 13, 2009
- Genre: Progressive rock, hard rock
- Length: 63:58
- Label: Anthem

Rush chronology
Grace Under Pressure Tour (2009)	Working Men (2009)	Time Machine 2011: Live in Cleveland (2011)

Professional ratings
Review scores
Source	Rating
AllMusic	3.5/5 stars
Classic Rock	7/10 stars
The Digital Fix	(6/10)
PopMatters	2/10 stars
Record Collector	4/5 stars
The Rolling Stone Album Guide	1.5/5 stars

Working Men is a live compilation album by Canadian progressive rock band Rush. The compilation documents a shortlist of career-spanning material pulled from the band's three tours during the 2000s. It is available in both CD and DVD formats like the previous releases. Both formats were released on November 13, 2009, in Europe and November 17, 2009, in the United States and Canada.

== Track listing ==
All tracks are written by Geddy Lee, Alex Lifeson & Neil Peart, except where noted.

No.	Title	Original album	Length
1.	"Limelight"	Snakes & Arrows Live (2008)	4:51
2.	"The Spirit of Radio"	R30: 30th Anniversary World Tour (2005)	5:07
3.	"2112: Overture/The Temples of Syrinx"	Rush in Rio (2003)	6:52
4.	"Freewill"	Snakes & Arrows Live	5:45
5.	"Dreamline"	R30: 30th Anniversary World Tour	5:13
6.	"Far Cry"	Snakes & Arrows Live	5:23
7.	"Subdivisions"	R30: 30th Anniversary World Tour	5:58
8.	"One Little Victory"	Previously unreleased (originally recorded from R30: 30th Anniversary World Tour)	5:26
9.	"Closer to the Heart" (Lee, Lifeson, Peart, Peter Talbot)	Rush in Rio	3:22
10.	"Tom Sawyer" (Lee, Lifeson, Peart, Pye Dubois)	Snakes & Arrows Live	5:34
11.	"Working Man" (Lee, Lifeson)	R30: 30th Anniversary World Tour	5:38
12.	"YYZ" (Lee, Peart)	Rush in Rio	4:49
Total length:			63:58

Notes

- Track 1, 10 & 12 are originally from Moving Pictures (1981)
- Track 2 & 4 are originally from Permanent Waves (1980)
- Track 3 is originally from 2112 (1976)
- Track 5 is originally from Roll the Bones (1991)
- Track 6 is originally from Snakes & Arrows (2007)
- Track 7 is originally from Signals (1982)
- Track 8 is originally from Vapor Trails (2002)
- Track 9 is originally from A Farewell to Kings (1977)
- Track 11 is originally from Rush (1974)
