= Retrospective (disambiguation) =

A retrospective looks back at events that have taken place.

Retrospective or A Retrospective may also refer to:

== Music ==
- Retrospective album, a one-artist compilation album of musical works

=== Albums ===
- Retrospective (Rosanne Cash album), 1995
- Retrospective (Indigo Girls album)
- Retrospective (Monkey House album), 2013
- Retrospective (Russell Morris album), 1978
- Retrospective (Red House Painters album)
- Retrospective (Rinôçérôse album), 1997
- Retrospective (X Marks the Pedwalk album)
- Retrospective (Bunny Wailer album), 1995
- Retrospective (Leaether Strip album)
- Retrospective: The Best of Buffalo Springfield, 1969
- Retrospective: The Music of Mad Men, 2015
- Retrospective: 1995–2005 by Natalie Merchant
- Retrospective I, by Rush
- Retrospective II, by Rush
- Retrospective III: 1989–2008, by Rush
- Retrospective 2, by Sevendust
- Retrospective EPs, by Keane
- A Retrospective (KRS-One album)
- A Retrospective (Lou Reed album)
- A Retrospective (Saetia album), 2001
- A Retrospective (Lynyrd Skynyrd album)
- A Retrospective (Pink Martini album), 2011
- A Retrospective: 1995–2000, by Son Volt
- Retrospective, an album by Ghoti Hook
- Retrospective, 1990 by Poco
- A Retrospective, a 1977 album by Linda Ronstadt
- A Retrospective, a 2004 EP by Pamela Moore

=== Songs ===
- "Retrospective", by Takanashi Kiara from Point of View

== Other uses ==
- Film retrospective, a screening of films around a theme, genre, era, or director
- Retrospective, a section of the Berlin International Film Festival

== See also ==
- Retrospective aspect or perfect aspect, in linguistics
- Retrospective diagnosis
