= Gold (Rush album) =

Compilation album by Rush
- Released: April 25, 2006
- Recorded: 1973–1987
- Genres: Hard rock; progressive rock; heavy metal
- Length: 2:35:01
- Label: Mercury
- Producers: Rush and others

Rush chronology
R30: 30th Anniversary World Tour (2005)	Gold (2006)	Snakes & Arrows (2007)

Professional ratings
Review scores
Source	Rating
AllMusic	3.5/5 stars
The Encyclopedia of Popular Music	3/5 stars
The Rolling Stone Album Guide	2.5/5 stars
Sea of Tranquility	4.5/5 stars

Gold is a compilation album by Canadian rock band Rush, released on April 25, 2006. It is a repackaging of the two 1997 Rush compilation albums, Retrospective I and Retrospective II, with the exception of the third track of the former, "Something for Nothing", which has been removed and replaced by "Working Man" on the first disc as the last track.

== Track listing ==
All lyrics by Neil Peart unless noted, all music by Geddy Lee and Alex Lifeson unless noted

=== Disc 1 ===
1. "The Spirit of Radio"
2. "The Trees"
3. "Freewill"
4. "Xanadu"
5. "Bastille Day"
6. "By-Tor and the Snow Dog"
7. "Anthem"
8. "Closer to the Heart" (Lyrics: Peart/Peter Talbot)
9. "2112: Overture"
10. "2112: The Temples of Syrinx"
11. "La Villa Strangiato" (Music: Lee/Lifeson/Peart)
12. "Fly by Night"
13. "Finding My Way" (Lyrics: Lee)
14. "Working Man" (Lyrics: Lee)

=== Disc 2 ===
1. "The Big Money"
2. "Red Barchetta"
3. "Subdivisions"
4. "Time Stand Still"
5. "Mystic Rhythms"
6. "The Analog Kid"
7. "Distant Early Warning"
8. "Marathon"
9. "The Body Electric"
10. "Mission"
11. "Limelight"
12. "Red Sector A"
13. "New World Man"
14. "Tom Sawyer" (Lyrics: Peart/Pye Dubois)
15. "Force Ten" (Lyrics: Peart/Pye Dubois)

== Track origins ==
=== Disc 1 ===
Tracks 13 & 14 from Rush (1974)
Tracks 6, 7 & 12 from Fly by Night (1975)
Track 5 from Caress of Steel (1975)
Tracks 9 & 10 from 2112 (1976)
Tracks 4 & 8 from A Farewell to Kings (1977)
Tracks 2 & 11 from Hemispheres (1978)
Tracks 1 & 3 from Permanent Waves (1980)

=== Disc 2 ===
Tracks 2, 11 & 14 from Moving Pictures (1981)
Tracks 3, 6 & 13 from Signals (1982)
Tracks 7, 9 & 12 from Grace Under Pressure (1984)
Tracks 1, 5 & 8 from Power Windows (1985)
Tracks 4, 10 & 15 from Hold Your Fire (1987)

== Personnel ==
- Geddy Lee – bass, vocals, synthesizers
- Alex Lifeson – acoustic and electric guitars
- Neil Peart – drums, percussion, lyricist
- John Rutsey – drums on "Finding My Way" and "Working Man"

with:

- Aimee Mann – vocals on "Time Stand Still"

== Charts ==
Chart performance for Gold
Chart (2026)	Peak position
Greek Albums (IFPI)	7

== See also ==
- Retrospective I
- Retrospective II
- Retrospective III: 1989–2008
