= Retrospect =

Retrospect may refer to:

== Television ==
- Retrospect (Star Trek: Voyager), a 1998 episode of Star Trek: Voyager

== Music ==
- Retrospect, a composition by Tage Nielsen (1929-2003)
- Retrospect, a piano composition by Alfred Hill (composer) (1870-1960)
- Retrospect, a hymn tune by William Billings (1746-1800)
- Retrospect Ensemble, a period-instrument orchestra and choir

=== Albums ===
- Retrospect (Epica album)
- Retrospect (Sevendust album)
- Retrospect, an album by Aztec Camera
- Retrospect, an album by Joe South
- Retrospect, an album by Kenneth Pattengale & Joey Ryan

== Computing and gaming ==
- Retrospect (software), a family of client-server backup software applications

== See also ==
- In Retrospect (disambiguation)
- Retrospective (disambiguation)
