= In Retrospect =

In Retrospect may refer to:

== Albums ==
- In Retrospect, by Cleo Laine, released in 1990
- In Retrospect (Nichols and May album), released in 1962
- In Retrospect, by The Toasters, released in 2003
- In Retrospect (Mal Waldron album), released in 1982

== Other ==
- In Retrospect: The Tragedy and Lessons of Vietnam (1995), a memoir by former US Secretary of Defense Robert McNamara

== See also ==
- Retrospect (disambiguation)
- Retrospective (disambiguation)
