= Presto tour =

1990 concert tour by Rush

Presto Tour
- Tour by Rush
- Poster to the concerts in Toronto, Canada
- Location: North America
- Associated album: Presto
- Start date: February 17, 1990
- End date: June 29, 1990
- No. of shows: 63

Rush concert chronology
- Hold Your Fire Tour (1987–1988); Presto Tour (1990); Roll the Bones Tour (1991–1992)

The Presto Tour was a concert tour by Canadian rock band Rush in support of their thirteenth studio album Presto.

== Background ==
The tour started on February 17, 1990 at Greenville Memorial Auditorium in Greenville, South Carolina and concluded on June 29, 1990 at Irvine Meadows Amphitheatre in Irvine, California, having performed to more than 650,000 fans. Opening bands that premiered in the tour included Mr. Big, Chalk Circle and Voivod. The stage production for each of the shows were presented with elements of the Presto cover art, which had featured lasers and Vari-Lites that were dropped from trusses on extensions as well as two giant inflatable rabbits, two sets of rear PA speakers on the back end of the stage floor to represent a quadrophonic effect on the sound which was engineered by Robert Scoville, and a projection screen that displayed video sequences and retro films throughout the performance. When the band performed in Toronto for two shows in May 1990, both shows had raised $200,000 for United Way for the demands on the band for complimentary tickets.

== Reception ==
Michael Hochanadel from the Daily Gazette opened his review stating that the visuals made the Rush concert at the Knickerbocker Arena on June 2, 1990, one of the biggest, brightest and overwhelming rock spectacles - with effects representing a 1970s arena rock throwback with the usage of lasers and haze. While criticizing the music's lyrics as being sometimes preachy, he stated that they were at the same time, anthemic and tackled subjects in a fairly obvious way, but added that they needed something to keep their songs from sounding too alike. Praising Lee's vocals, Hochanadel affirmed that his voice gave the songs emotion that the lyrics did not always earn.

Reviewing the Pittsburgh performance on June 7, 1990, Janice Haidet of The Vindicator stated that the band put a huge reliance on talent from the instruments they were using, treating a crowded arena of fans to a "searing rock and roll feast". Haidet noted that the band kept the audience standing on their seats with fists raised in time with the music, and Geddy Lee delivering extraordinary vocals that were presented by a balanced and clear sound mix - also noting the show as one of the best light shows in rock music, although outdone by Genesis and Pink Floyd. Peter B. King from the Pittsburgh Press who was in attendance at the same show that night, stated that the band had offered some of the best visuals seen at a rock concert, and expressed that Rush had delivered an intelligent, distinctive brand of "art rock".

== Set list ==
This is an example set list adapted from Rush: Wandering the Face of the Earth – The Official Touring History of what were performed during the tour, but may not represent the majority of the shows.

1. "Force Ten"
2. "Freewill"
3. "Distant Early Warning"
4. "Time Stand Still"
5. "Subdivisions"
6. "Marathon"
7. "Red Barchetta"
8. "Superconductor"
9. "Show Don't Tell"
10. "The Pass"
11. "Closer to the Heart"
12. "Manhattan Project"
13. "Xanadu"
14. "YYZ"
15. "The Rhythm Method" (Neil Peart drum solo)
16. "Scars"
17. "War Paint"
18. "Mission"
19. "Tom Sawyer"
  Encore
20. "The Big Money"
21. "2112: Overture"
22. "La Villa Strangiato"
23. "In the Mood"
24. "Wipeout!"

== Tour dates ==
List of 1990 concerts
Date	City	Country	Venue	Attendance	Revenue
February 17, 1990	Greenville	United States	Greenville Memorial Auditorium	7,230 / 7,230	$137,370
February 19, 1990	Jacksonville	United States	Jacksonville Memorial Coliseum	7,254 / 7,500	$128,279
February 20, 1990	St. Petersburg	United States	Bayfront Center	7,094 / 8,400	$124,838
February 22, 1990	Miami	United States	Miami Arena	13,541 / 13,541	$245,662
February 23, 1990	Orlando	United States	Orlando Arena	12,156 / 12,156	$220,650
February 25, 1990	New Orleans	United States	Lakefront Arena	9,204 / 9,204	$165,113
February 26, 1990	Houston	United States	The Summit	13,153 / 13,153	$240,119
February 28, 1990	San Antonio	United States	Convention Center Arena	9,656 / 11,468	$158,698
March 1, 1990	Dallas	United States	Reunion Arena	15,666 / 15,666	$239,509
March 3, 1990	Kansas City	United States	Kemper Arena	12,145 / 16,000	$224,682
March 5, 1990	St. Louis	United States	St. Louis Arena	12,750 / 12,750	$228,309
March 6, 1990	Cincinnati	United States	Riverfront Coliseum	13,032 / 13,032	$235,968
March 8, 1990	Auburn Hills	United States	The Palace of Auburn Hills	27,622 / 28,000	$572,440
March 9, 1990	Auburn Hills	United States	The Palace of Auburn Hills	27,622 / 28,000	$572,440
March 20, 1990	Edmonton	Canada	Northlands Coliseum	7,500 / 13,049	$132,900
March 21, 1990	Calgary	Canada	Olympic Saddledome	8,107 / 11,754	$109,720
March 23, 1990	Vancouver	Canada	Pacific Coliseum	12,701 / 12,701	$185,993
March 24, 1990	Portland	United States	Veterans Memorial Coliseum	8,931 / 9,300	$169,689
March 26, 1990	Seattle	United States	Seattle Center Coliseum	12,299 / 12,299	$219,410
March 28, 1990	Sacramento	United States	ARCO Arena	12,236 / 12,236	$232,602
March 30, 1990	Oakland	United States	Oakland Coliseum	26,124 / 26,124	$509,436
March 31, 1990	Oakland	United States	Oakland Coliseum	26,124 / 26,124	$509,436
April 2, 1990	Inglewood	United States	Great Western Forum	28,000 / 28,000	$535,300
April 3, 1990	Inglewood	United States	Great Western Forum	28,000 / 28,000	$535,300
April 5, 1990	San Diego	United States	San Diego Sports Arena	12,000 / 12,000	$218,300
April 7, 1990	Costa Mesa	United States	Pacific Amphitheatre	13,856 / 18,861	$298,250
April 8, 1990	Phoenix	United States	Arizona Veterans Memorial Coliseum	13,669 / 13,669	$243,040
April 20, 1990	East Rutherford	United States	Brendan Byrne Arena	18,717 / 18,717	$350,944
April 22, 1990	Uniondale	United States	Nassau Coliseum	15,546 / 15,546	$302,391
April 24, 1990	Philadelphia	United States	The Spectrum	14,130 / 14,130	$256,937
April 25, 1990	East Rutherford	United States	Brendan Byrne Arena	13,138 / 14,953	$241,334
April 27, 1990	Philadelphia	United States	The Spectrum	14,130 / 14,130	$256,937
April 28, 1990	Rochester	United States	War Memorial Auditorium	8,418 / 8,418	$158,866
May 1, 1990	Atlanta	United States	The Omni	12,186 / 12,186	$221,384
May 2, 1990	Charlotte	United States	Charlotte Coliseum	7,985 / 16,003	$155,708
May 4, 1990	Richmond	United States	Richmond Coliseum	6,819 / 9,543	$126,152
May 5, 1990	Largo	United States	Capital Centre	—N/a	—N/a
May 7, 1990	Providence	United States	Civic Center	11,888 / 12,100	$231,816
May 8, 1990	Hartford	United States	Hartford Civic Center	11,991 / 12,513	$229,535
May 10, 1990	Worcester	United States	The Centrum	21,897 / 23,344	$413,870
May 11, 1990	Worcester	United States	The Centrum	21,897 / 23,344	$413,870
May 13, 1990	Quebec City	Canada	Colisée Quebec City	10,540 / 11,500	$181,500
May 14, 1990	Montreal	Canada	Montreal Forum	12,128 / 12,800	$208,301
May 16, 1990	Toronto	Canada	Maple Leaf Gardens	—N/a	—N/a
May 17, 1990	Toronto	Canada	Maple Leaf Gardens	—N/a	—N/a
June 2, 1990	Albany	United States	Knickerbocker Arena	14,335 / 14,335	$267,232
June 4, 1990	Baltimore	United States	Baltimore Arena	5,671 / 14,000	$110,585
June 5, 1990	Hampton	United States	Hampton Coliseum	7,227 / 9,124	$133,699
June 7, 1990	Pittsburgh	United States	Civic Arena	11,049 / 12,500	$209,462
June 8, 1990	Richfield	United States	Richfield Coliseum	15,539 / 15,539	$310,780
June 10, 1990	Cuyahoga Falls	United States	Blossom Music Center	—N/a	—N/a
June 11, 1990	Cincinnati	United States	Riverbend Music Center	8,089 / 8,089	$163,802
June 13, 1990	Columbus	United States	Cooper Stadium	9,654 / 15,000	$207,515
June 14, 1990	Noblesville	United States	Deer Creek Music Center	7,904 / 18,062	$135,198
June 16, 1990	East Troy	United States	Alpine Valley Music Theatre	40,269 / 60,000	$886,384
June 17, 1990	East Troy	United States	Alpine Valley Music Theatre	40,269 / 60,000	$886,384
June 19, 1990	Bloomington	United States	Met Center	10,725 / 10,725	$201,864
June 20, 1990	Omaha	United States	Omaha Civic Auditorium	5,349 / 8,000	$105,643
June 22, 1990	Englewood	United States	Fiddler's Green Amphitheatre	—N/a	—N/a
June 24, 1990	Salt Lake City	United States	Salt Palace	—N/a	—N/a
June 26, 1990	Sacramento	United States	Cal Expo Amphitheatre	14,355 / 14,355	$327,218
June 27, 1990	Mountain View	United States	Shoreline Amphitheatre	15,400 / 20,000	$287,931
June 29, 1990	Irvine	United States	Irvine Meadows Amphitheatre	15,000 / 15,000	$337,203

== Personnel ==
- Geddy Lee – vocals, bass, keyboards
- Alex Lifeson – guitar, backing vocals
- Neil Peart – drums
