= Into the Darkness =

Into the Darkness may refer to:

- "Into the Darkness" (song), the first movement of Canadian rock band Rush's three-part "short story" "The Necromancer"
- "Into the Darkness", a song by Kittie from the album Until the End
- Into the Darkness (novel), the first book in Harry Turtledove's Darkness series
- Into the Darkness (film), a 2020 Danish film
- Urban Explorers: Into the Darkness, a 2007 documentary film about urban exploration
- Star Trek Into Darkness, a 2013 film in the Star Trek franchise
