= Andrew MacNaughton =

Andrew MacNaughton may refer to:

- Andrew McNaughton, Canadian engineer and diplomat
- Andrew MacNaughtan, Canadian music video director
