= Retrospective I =

Compilation album by Rush
- Released: May 6, 1997
- Recorded: 1973–1979
- Genres: Hard rock, progressive rock, heavy metal
- Length: 75:49
- Labels: Anthem (Canada); Mercury
- Producers: Rush and Terry Brown

Rush chronology
Test for Echo (1996)	Retrospective I (1997)	Retrospective II (1997)

Professional ratings
Review scores
Source	Rating
Allmusic	4.5/5 stars
The Encyclopedia of Popular Music	3/5 stars
MusicHound Rock	4/5 stars
The Rolling Stone Album Guide	3/5 stars
The Virgin Encyclopedia of 80s Music	3/5 stars

Retrospective I: 1974 to 1980 is a compilation album by Canadian rock band Rush, released in 1997. The album features songs from the first decade of the band. The set is not in chronological order.

This compilation album is now disc one of the 2006 Rush compilation album Gold, with "Something for Nothing" replaced by "Working Man". Cover art was painted by Canadian artist Dan Hudson.

== Track listing ==
No.	Title	Original release	Length
1.	"The Spirit of Radio"	Permanent Waves (1980)	4:59
2.	"The Trees"	Hemispheres (1978)	4:45
3.	"Something for Nothing"	2112 (1976)	4:00
4.	"Freewill"	Permanent Waves	5:24
5.	"Xanadu"	A Farewell to Kings (1977)	11:07
6.	"Bastille Day"	Caress of Steel (1975)	4:40
7.	"By-Tor and the Snow Dog": I. "At the Tobes of Hades" (0:36); II. "Across the Styx" (0:35)"; III. "Of the Battle" (6:23); i. "Challenge and Defiance" (2:43); ii. "7/4 War Furor" (0:37); iii. "Aftermath" (1:58); iv. "Hymn of Triumph" (1:05); IV. "Epilogue" (1:04)	Fly by Night (1975)	8:39
8.	"Anthem"	Fly by Night	4:24
9.	"Closer to the Heart"	A Farewell to Kings	2:55
10.	"Overture" (Part I of "2112")	2112	4:32
11.	"The Temples of Syrinx" (Part II of "2112")	2112	2:13
12.	"La Villa Strangiato": I. "Buenos Nochas, Mein Froinds!" (0:27); II. "To Sleep, Perchance to Dream..." (1:33); III. "Strangiato Theme" (1:16); IV. "A Lerxst in Wonderland" (2:33); V. "Monsters!" (0:21); VI. "The Ghost of the Aragon" (0:35); VII. "Danforth and Pape" (0:41); VIII. "The Waltz of the Shreves" (0:26); IX. "Never Turn Your Back on a Monster!" (0:11); X. "Monsters! (Reprise)" (0:14); XI. "Strangiato Theme (Reprise)" (1:03); XII. "A Farewell to Things" (0:15)	Hemispheres	9:37
13.	"Fly by Night"	Fly by Night	3:22
14.	"Finding My Way"	Rush (1974)	5:05
Total length:			1:15:42

== Personnel ==
- Geddy Lee – bass guitars, vocals, synthesizers
- Alex Lifeson – electric and acoustic guitars
- Neil Peart – drums, percussion, lyricist
- John Rutsey – drums on "Finding My Way"

== See also ==
- Retrospective II
- Gold
- Retrospective III: 1989–2008
