= Didacts and Narpets =

Movement by Rush

from the album Caress of Steel
- Released: September 24, 1975
- Recorded: July 1975
- Studio: Toronto Sound (Toronto)
- Genre: Avant-garde; art rock
- Length: 1:00
- Composer(s): Geddy Lee; Alex Lifeson
- Lyricist(s): Neil Peart
- Producer(s): Rush; Terry Brown

"The Fountain of Lamneth" chronology
| I. "In the Valley" (1975) | II. "Didacts and Narpets" (1975) | III. "No One at the Bridge" (1975) |

"Didacts and Narpets" is the second movement of Canadian rock band Rush's suite "The Fountain of Lamneth", the fifth and final track on their third studio album, Caress of Steel (1975). As with three other sections of the suite, the lyrics were written by drummer Neil Peart, and the music composed by bassist and lead vocalist Geddy Lee and guitarist Alex Lifeson. It was recorded in July 1975 at Toronto Sound under production of the band and Terry Brown.

The experimental avant-garde piece is Rush's shortest sole composition, and, according to band historian Martin Popoff, their most bizarre recording. It is a drum solo punctuated by distorted power chords and yelps, representing an argument between the story's character and the titular didacts (teachers) and narpets (parents). Retrospective coverage of the band and Caress of Steel frequently highlighted "Didacts and Narpets", although detractors felt it was out of place on "The Fountain of Lamneth". Mike Mangini covered the song for a Rush tribute album named Subdivisions (2005), which was released by Magna Carta Records and featured various artists.

== Background and composition ==
Like three other sections from "The Fountain of Lamneth" ("In the Valley", "No One at the Bridge", and "The Fountain"), "Didacts and Narpets" was composed by bassist/lead vocalist Geddy Lee and guitarist Alex Lifeson; its lyrics, as with all of the suite, were written by drummer Neil Peart. All of Caress of Steel (1975), including "Didacts and Narpets", was recorded in July 1975 at Toronto Sound. It was arranged and produced by Rush and engineer Terry Brown.

The shortest composition on any Rush album, (Note: Several other movements of Rush suites are less than a minute, and thus shorter than "Didacts and Narpets". "La Villa Strangiato" had seven, including "Buenos Nochas, Mein Froinds!", "Monsters!", "The Ghost of the Aragon", "Danforth and Pape", "The Waltz of the Shreves", "Monsters! (Reprise)", and "A Farewell to Things". "By-Tor and the Snow Dog"'s "At the Tobes of Hades", "Across the Styx", and "7/4 War Furor", and the first numbered section of "Cygnus X-1 Book One: The Voyage" were under a minute as well. However, parts of those tracks do not function as separate songs the way those of "The Fountain of Lamneth" do, so they do not count as sole compositions. The acoustic guitar-only ballad "The Sphere A Kind of Dream", which concluded "Cygnus X-1 Book II: Hemsipheres", is a close second at 1:02.) "Didacts and Narpets" is a minute-long avant-garde piece, a frantic, aggressive, and "thunderous" drum solo. The dramatic distorted power chords and unintelligible yelps of words punctuate certain drum hits: "Stay. Go. Work. No. Think. Live. Earn. Give. Stay or fight. What's right?" It represents the unnamed character's angst, rebellion, energy, and chaotic living circumstances during their teenage years, specifically an argument between them and the titular didacts (teachers) and narpets (anagram of parents), who each have conflicting teaching methods and viewpoints. This produces cognitive dissonance in the character.

Chris McDonald, interpreting "The Fountain of Lamneth" as an escapist fantasy that is an allegory for growing up and attempting to achieve a goal, described "Didacts and Narpets" as one of the character's obstacles. He commented that its guitar and vocals "sound a bit like sudden, marauding attacks and a bit like the barking of orders."

== Reception and legacy ==
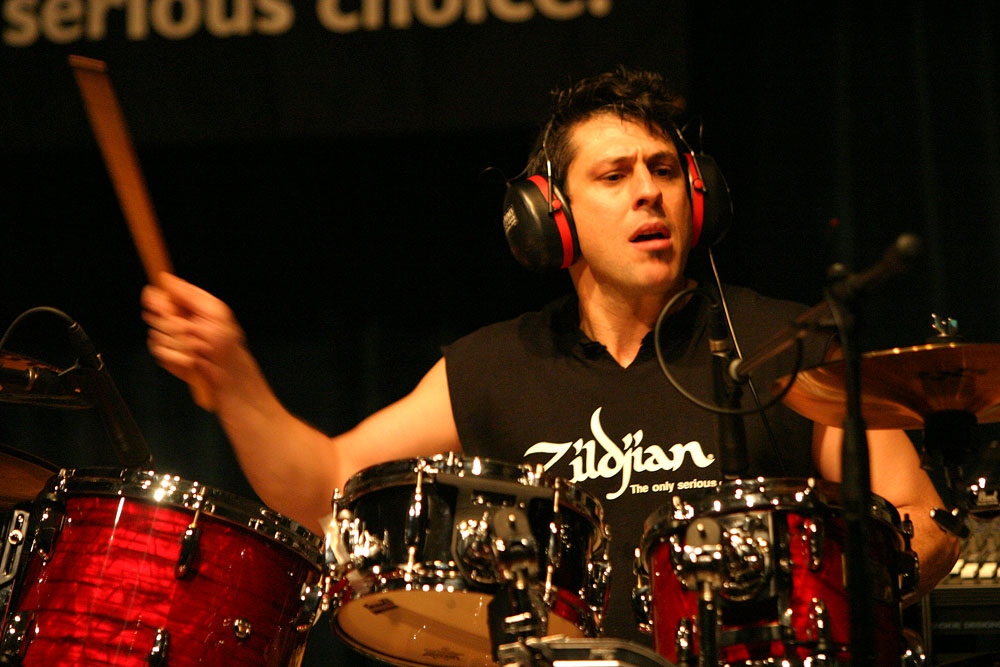
Mike Mangini in 2004. He covered "Didacts and Narpets" for a 2005 Rush tribute album.

Caress of Steel was released on September 24, 1975; "Didacts and Narpets" is the second part on "The Fountain of Lamneth", which served as the album's fifth and final track. Lee attributed the initial critical and commercial failure of Caress of Steel to listeners and writers unable to understand the material, citing "Didacts and Narpets" as an example. Although "The Fountain of Lamneth" was heavily discussed in contemporaneous reviews, "Didacts and Narpets" was almost never covered except for its name cited as an example of Peart's "pretentious" poetry by Dave Dimartino of The State News.

Retrospective coverage of "Didacts and Narpets" has been positive. In 2013, Rush historian Martin Popoff labeled "Didacts and Narpets" "one strange minute of experimentation that remains the band's most bizarre recorded sequence". In a Neil Peart obituary for Deadline Hollywood, Erik Pederson recommended "Didacts and Narpets" as a showcase of the drummer's lyrics and "insane drumming" on Rush's albums pre-Permanent Waves (1980); he cited no other song. Geoff Barton, writing for Classic Rock, also labeled "Didacts and Narpets" a highlight of Caress of Steel; for Rush biographers Bill Banasiewicz and James McCarthy, it was a favorite moment on "The Fountain of Lamneth".

Voivod drummer Michel Langevin has expressed admiration for "Didacts and Narpets". He called it a Max Roach-esque avant-garde jazz piece, highlighting its "very dualistic" presentation of "order versus chaos, light versus darkness, good versus evil". Adrien Begrand enjoyed "Didacts and Narpets" as a "fun" and "raucous" drum solo, a contrast to the "eleven-minute slog" of the following three sections of "The Fountain of Lamneth" combined. Jordan Hoffman of Thrillist called it "glorious dark drug, art-rock weirdness".

More negatively, guitarist Jim Matheos found "Didacts and Narpets" and "I Think I'm Going Bald" to be Caress of Steel's weakest tracks, being a "little out of place" and "failed experiments". James Richards, although complimenting the "fabulous drumming" and the overall piece's "terrific crescendo", called it "about as enjoyable as standing on an upturned electric plug with your bare feet". He felt "Didacts and Narpets" hampered the flow of "The Fountain of Lamneth". Ryan Reed similarly called it "randomly inserted" into the suite.

Drummer Mike Mangini covered "Didacts and Narpets" for Magna Carta Records' various artists tribute album for Rush, Subdivisions (2005). Music Street Journal's Gary Hill praised the cover's faithfulness to Rush's original recording, but also found it an odd inclusion on the tribute album.

== Personnel ==
Credits from liner notes for Caress of Steel.

Rush

- Geddy Lee – vocals, bass guitar
- Alex Lifeson – electric guitar
- Neil Peart – drums, lyrics

Technical

- Rush – co-producers, arrangements
- Terry Brown – co-producer, engineer, arrangements
