= Lakeside Park (song) =

Single by Rush

from the album Caress of Steel
- B-side: "Bastille Day"
- Released: November 1975
- Studio: Toronto Sound (Toronto)
- Genre: Hard rock; progressive rock; pop rock
- Length: 4:08
- Label: Mercury
- Songwriters: Geddy Lee, Alex Lifeson; Lyrics by Neil Peart
- Producers: Rush, Terry Brown

Rush singles chronology
"The Necromancer: Return of the Prince" (1975)	"Lakeside Park" (1975)	"The Twilight Zone" (1976)

"Lakeside Park" is a single from Rush's third album Caress of Steel. The music was written by Geddy Lee and Alex Lifeson, and the lyrics were written by Neil Peart.

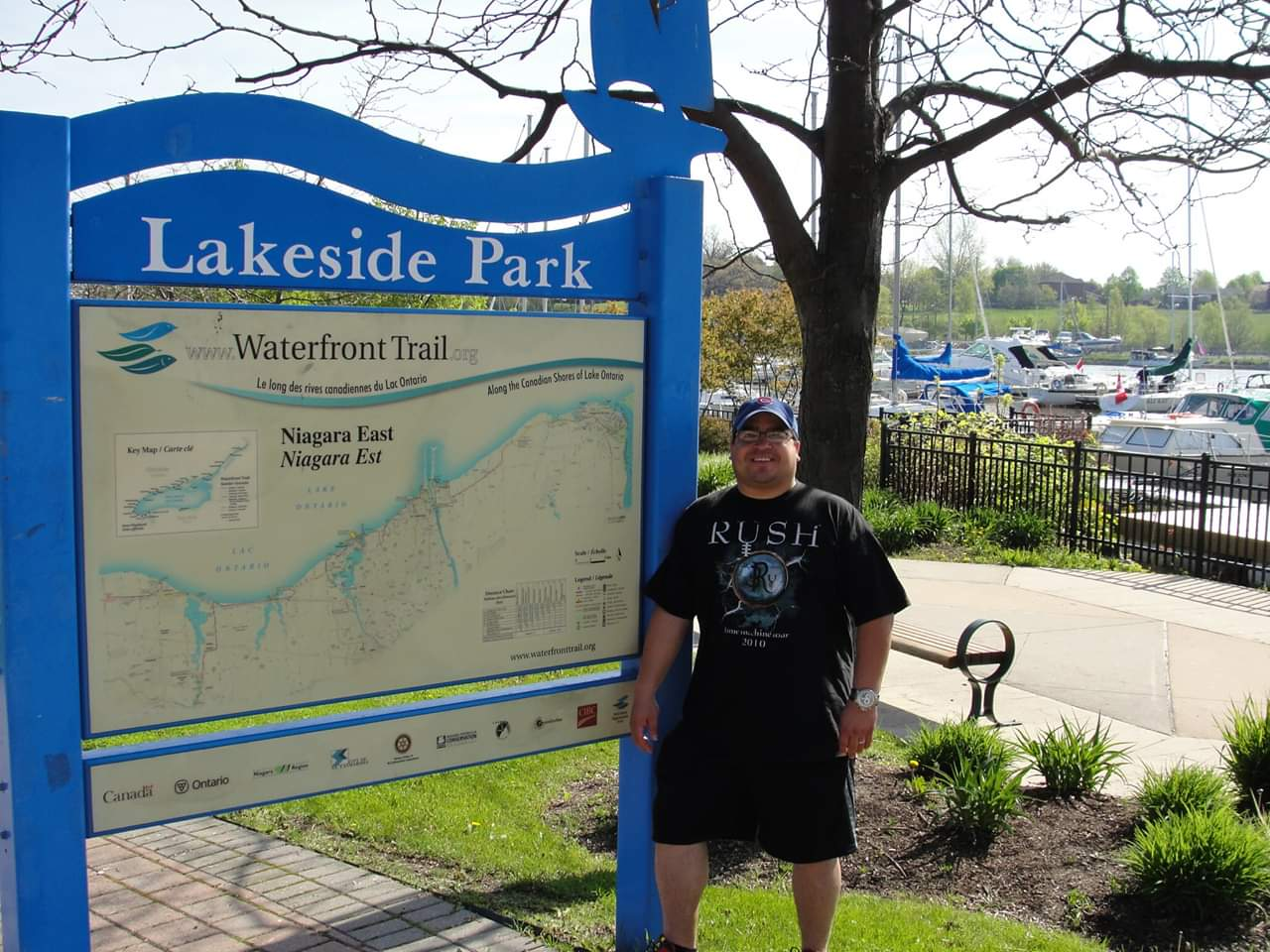
Rush Fan, Sam Olivares at Lakeside Park.

== Background ==
The "Lakeside Park" mentioned in this song is on the shore of Port Dalhousie, a suburb of St. Catharines, Ontario, on the south shore of Lake Ontario in Canada. Peart lived very close to Lakeside Park, and spent summers as a youth working and playing there. The lyrics mention the "24th of May", which is Victoria Day, commemorating Queen Victoria's birthday.

The actual Lakeside Park in Port Dalhousie overlooks the War of 1812 wreck sites of USS Hamilton and USS Scourge. The smaller of the two piers in Port Dalhousie has been used as a staging area for most of the Hamilton–Scourge survey expeditions to the wreck sites, since the early 1980s.

Neil Peart gave some insight regarding the song:

In my early teens I achieved every Port kid’s dream: a summer job at Lakeside Park. In those days it was still a thriving and exciting whirl of rides, games, music, and lights. So many ghosts haunt that vanished midway; so many memories bring it back for me. I ran the Bubble Game—calling out ‘Catch a bubble; prize every time’ all day—and sometimes the Ball Toss game. When it wasn’t busy, I would sit at the back door and watch the kids on the trampoline. … I got fired.

— Neil Peart, A Port Boy’s Story; Merely Players

Geddy Lee gave a somewhat unfavorable mention of this song in a 1993 interview:

A lot of the early stuff I'm really proud of. Some of it sounds really goofy, but some of it stands up better than I gave it credit for. As weird as my voice sounds when I listen back, I certainly dig some of the arrangements. I can't go back beyond 2112 really, because that starts to get a bit hairy for me, and if I hear "Lakeside Park" on the radio I cringe. What a lousy song! Still, I don't regret anything that I've done.

— Geddy Lee, Raw Magazine

In June 2020, the city of St. Catharines announced that a pavilion in Lakeside Park would be named after Neil Peart.

== Live performances ==
The song was played in part, for the first time since the mid-1970s, on the 2015 R40 tour. In a 2016 interview with Guitar World, Lee reaffirmed his distaste for the song, but agreed to include it in the setlist when Lifeson expressed interest.

== Personnel ==
- Geddy Lee - vocals, bass
- Alex Lifeson - guitars
- Neil Peart - drums

== See also ==
- List of Rush songs
