= Rush in Rio =

Live album by Rush
- Released: October 21, 2003
- Recorded: November 23, 2002; September 27, 2002 ("Between Sun & Moon"); October 19, 2002 ("Vital Signs")
- Venues: Maracanã Stadium (Rio de Janeiro, Brazil)
- Genres: Hard rock, progressive rock
- Length: 189:59
- Label: Anthem
- Producers: Alex Lifeson and James "Jimbo" Barton

Rush chronology
The Spirit of Radio: Greatest Hits 1974–1987 (2003)	Rush in Rio (2003)	Feedback (2004)

Professional ratings
Review scores
Source	Rating
AllMusic	4.5/5 stars
The Encyclopedia of Popular Music	3/5 stars
The Essential Rock Discography	7/10
IGN	(8/10)
The Rolling Stone Album Guide	3.5/5 stars

Rush in Rio is a three-disc live album by the Canadian band Rush, released on October 21, 2003. The album is also available as a two-DVD set. With the exception of the last two tracks on the third disc, the album was recorded at Maracanã Stadium in Rio de Janeiro on the final night of the Vapor Trails Tour. The other two tracks were taken from previous shows on the same tour. "Between Sun & Moon" was recorded at the Cricket Wireless Pavilion, Phoenix, Arizona, on September 27, 2002, and "Vital Signs" was recorded at the Colisée Pepsi, Quebec City, Quebec, on October 19, 2002.

The DVD has been certified 7× Platinum by the R.I.A.A. in the US, with over 700,000 copies sold as of September 2010. The track "O Baterista" was nominated for a Grammy Award for Best Rock Instrumental Performance in 2005, but lost to Brian Wilson's "Mrs. O'Leary's Cow".

Rush in Rio was the first live album released by the band that did not follow the pattern of releasing a live album after every four studio albums; every subsequent tour would receive a live album release. It was also the first to feature a complete setlist without any changes in song order (including Neil Peart's drum solo), and the first that presents a single night's performance in its entirety (not counting the two bonus tracks). In an interview about the album and DVD, Alex Lifeson and James "Jimbo" Barton noted that it took an extended amount of time to mix the sound due to technical difficulties in recording the audio on primitive equipment.

At this concert, Rush played to 40,000, their second-largest crowd on the Vapor Trails Tour (the largest crowd was 60,000 at the show the previous night in São Paulo). In a rare departure from the band's practice of re-creating the sound of their studio work during live performances, the song "Resist" (on disc 2) was rearranged into a stripped-down acoustic version featuring Lifeson and Geddy Lee, with Peart sitting out after his drum solo.

== Track listing ==
All lyrics are written by Neil Peart, except where noted; all music is composed by Geddy Lee and Alex Lifeson, except where noted.

Disc one
No.	Title	Lyrics	Music	Length
1.	"Tom Sawyer"	Peart; Pye Dubois		5:04
2.	"Distant Early Warning"			4:50
3.	"New World Man"			4:04
4.	"Roll the Bones"			6:15
5.	"Earthshine"			5:44
6.	"YYZ"		Lee; Lifeson; Peart	4:56
7.	"The Pass"			4:52
8.	"Bravado"			6:18
9.	"The Big Money"			6:03
10.	"The Trees"			5:12
11.	"Freewill"			5:48
12.	"Closer to the Heart"	Peart; Peter Talbot		3:04
13.	"Natural Science"			8:34

Disc two
No.	Title	Music	Length
1.	"One Little Victory"		5:32
2.	"Driven"		5:22
3.	"Ghost Rider"		5:36
4.	"Secret Touch"		7:00
5.	"Dreamline"		5:10
6.	"Red Sector A"		5:16
7.	"Leave That Thing Alone"		4:59
8.	"O Baterista"	Peart	8:54
9.	"Resist"		4:23
10.	"2112"		6:52

Disc three
No.	Title	Lyrics	Music	Length
1.	"Limelight"			4:29
2.	"La Villa Strangiato"		Lee; Lifeson; Peart	10:05
3.	"The Spirit of Radio"			5:28
4.	"By-Tor and the Snow Dog"			4:34
5.	"Cygnus X-1"			3:12
6.	"Working Man"	Lee; Lifeson	Lee; Lifeson	5:48

The Board Bootlegs
No.	Title	Lyrics	Length
7.	"Between Sun & Moon"	Peart; Dubois	4:48
8.	"Vital Signs"		4:59

== Personnel ==
Rush

- Geddy Lee – vocals, bass, acoustic guitars, synthesizers
- Alex Lifeson – electric and acoustic guitars, backing vocals
- Neil Peart – drums, percussion

Production

- Produced and mixed by Alex Lifeson and James "Jimbo" Barton
- Recorded and engineered by Brad Madix
- Mastered by Adam Ayan
- Directed and produced by Daniel Catullo

Additional Recording Studios: Icon Recording Studios, Hollywood, California.

- Icon Recording Studios owner and Chief Engineer – Andrew Troy
- Assistant Engineer – Aaron Kaplay
- 2nd Assistant Engineer – Pablo Solorzano

== Charts ==
Chart (2003)	Peak position
US Billboard 200	33

== Certifications ==
Region	Certification	Certified units/sales
Canada (Music Canada)	Gold	50,000^{^}
United States (RIAA)	Gold	500,000^{^}
^{^} Shipments figures based on certification alone.
