= Retrospective II =

Compilation album by Rush
- Released: June 3, 1997
- Recorded: 1980–1987
- Genres: Progressive rock, synth-rock, new wave
- Length: 76:42
- Labels: Anthem (Canada); Mercury
- Producers: Rush, Peter Henderson, Peter Collins

Rush chronology
Retrospective I (1997)	Retrospective II (1997)	Different Stages (1998)

Professional ratings
Review scores
Source	Rating
Allmusic	link
The Encyclopedia of Popular Music	3/5 stars
MusicHound Rock	4/5 stars
The Rolling Stone Album Guide	link
The Virgin Encyclopedia of 80s Music	3/5 stars

Retrospective II: 1981 to 1987 is a compilation album by Canadian rock band Rush, released in 1997 (see 1997 in music). The album features songs from the second decade of the band.

This compilation album is now disc two of the 2006 Rush compilation album Gold.

== Track listing ==
No.	Title	Original release	Length
1.	"The Big Money"	Power Windows (1985)	5:35
2.	"Red Barchetta"	Moving Pictures (1981)	6:09
3.	"Subdivisions"	Signals (1982)	5:33
4.	"Time Stand Still"	Hold Your Fire (1987)	5:09
5.	"Mystic Rhythms"	Power Windows	5:54
6.	"The Analog Kid" (Complete Version)	Signals	4:48
7.	"Distant Early Warning"	Grace Under Pressure (1984)	4:57
8.	"Marathon"	Power Windows	6:10
9.	"The Body Electric"	Grace Under Pressure	5:00
10.	"Mission"	Hold Your Fire	5:16
11.	"Limelight"	Moving Pictures	4:20
12.	"Red Sector A"	Grace Under Pressure	5:08
13.	"New World Man"	Signals	3:42
14.	"Tom Sawyer"	Moving Pictures	4:33
15.	"Force Ten"	Hold Your Fire	4:31
Total length:			1:16:42

== Personnel ==
- Geddy Lee – bass guitars, synthesizers, vocals
- Alex Lifeson – electric and acoustic guitars, synthesizers
- Neil Peart – drums, percussion, electronic percussion, lyricist

== See also ==
- Retrospective I
- Gold
- Retrospective III: 1989–2008
