= Feedback (EP) =

2004 EP by Rush

EP by Rush
- Released: June 29, 2004
- Recorded: March–April 2004
- Studio: Phase One, Toronto
- Genre: Hard rock; heavy metal; blues rock
- Length: 27:08
- Label: Anthem
- Producer: David Leonard, Rush

Rush chronology
Rush in Rio (2003)	Feedback (2004)	R30: 30th Anniversary World Tour (2005)

Feedback is an EP by Canadian rock band Rush, released in 2004. The record features eight covers of songs that were influential for the band members during the 1960s. The outing marked the 30th anniversary of both the release of Rush's debut album, which featured the original lineup of Geddy Lee, Alex Lifeson and John Rutsey, and of Neil Peart's joining the band in the wake of Rutsey's departure. The tour in support of the Feedback album was called the R30: 30th Anniversary Tour. The record was remastered and reissued in 2013 as a part of the box set The Studio Albums 1989–2007. In 2016 it was reissued after being remastered by Sean Magee at Abbey Road Studios following a direct approach by Rush to remaster their entire back catalogue.

== Critical reception ==
Professional ratings
Review scores
Source	Rating
AllMusic	4/5 stars
The Encyclopedia of Popular Music	2/5 stars
The Essential Rock Discography	6/10
Stylus Magazine	F
USA Today	3.5/4 stars

Rhapsody praised the EP, calling it one of their favourite cover releases. AllMusic reviewer Thom Jurek called the track list "amazing" and said "None of these tunes are done with an ounce of camp. What the listener encounters is a Rush that has never ever been heard before."

== Track listing ==
No.	Title	Writer(s)	Original artist/Inspiration	Length
1.	"Summertime Blues"	Eddie Cochran/Jerry Capehart	Eddie Cochran, Blue Cheer, The Who	3:43
2.	"Heart Full of Soul"	Graham Gouldman	The Yardbirds	2:52
3.	"For What It's Worth"	Stephen Stills	Buffalo Springfield	3:30
4.	"The Seeker"	Pete Townshend	The Who	3:27
5.	"Mr. Soul"	Neil Young	Buffalo Springfield	3:51
6.	"Seven and Seven Is"	Arthur Lee	Love	2:53
7.	"Shapes of Things"	Paul Samwell-Smith/Keith Relf/Jim McCarty	The Yardbirds, The Jeff Beck Group	3:16
8.	"Crossroads"	Robert Johnson	Robert Johnson, Cream	3:27
Total length:				27:08

== Personnel ==
- Geddy Lee – lead vocals, bass guitar
- Alex Lifeson – guitar
- Neil Peart – drums, percussion

== Singles ==
Information
"Summertime Blues"
- Released: May 21, 2004
- Written by Jerry Capehart and Eddie Cochran
- Produced by Rush and David Leonard
- Chart positions: No. 30 US Mainstream Rock

== Charts ==
Chart (2004)	Peak position
Canadian Albums (Billboard)	5
German Albums (Offizielle Top 100)	59
US Billboard 200	19

Chart (2026)	Peak position
Hungarian Physical Albums (MAHASZ)	10
