= Retrospective: The Music of Mad Men =

Soundtrack album by various artists
- Released: October 13, 2015
- Genre: Compilation
- Label: Republic Records
- Producer: Matthew Weiner

Retrospective: The Music of Mad Men is a soundtrack album of television series Mad Men, released in 2015 by Republic Records in partnership with Lions Gate Entertainment.

== Summary ==
Each track on this album was featured in one or more episodes of the series. Along with songs popular in the 1960s, the album also features a song by The Decemberists, three songs performed by cast members (Christina Hendricks, Jessica Paré, and Robert Morse), two suites by Mad Men composer David Carbonara, and the main theme music by RJD2.

== Track list ==
No.	Title	Writer(s)	Episode	Length
1.	"A Beautiful Mine" (RJD2)	RJD2	All episodes (opening theme)	3:25
2.	"Band of Gold" (Don Cherry and Ray Conniff & His Orchestra)	Jack Taylor, Robert Musel	101 "Smoke Gets in Your Eyes"	2:34
3.	"On the Street Where You Live" (Vic Damone)	Alan Jay Lerner, Frederick Loewe	101 "Smoke Gets in Your Eyes"	2:42
4.	"My Special Angel" (Bobby Helms)	Jimmy Duncan	109 "Shoot"	2:57
5.	"Don't Think Twice, It's All Right" (Dylan)	Bob Dylan	113 "The Wheel"	3:37
6.	"The Infanta" (The Decemberists)	Colin Meloy	206 "Maidenform"	5:07
7.	"Early in the Morning" (Peter, Paul and Mary)	Paul Stookey	208 "A Night to Remember"	1:35
8.	"C'est Magnifique" (Christina Hendricks)	Cole Porter	303 "My Old Kentucky Home"	2:33
9.	"The End of the World" (Skeeter Davis)	Arthur Kent, Sylvia Dee	312 "The Grown-Ups"	2:36
10.	"Shahdaroba" (Roy Orbison)	Cindy Walker	313 "Shut the Door. Have a Seat."	2:38
11.	"Score Suite 1" (Carbonara)	David Carbonara	106 "Babylon"	4:12
12.	"Zou Bisou Bisou" (Jessica Paré)	Bill Shepherd, Alan Tew, Michel Rivgauche	501 "A Little Kiss"	2:17
13.	"I Just Wasn't Made for These Times" (The Beach Boys)	Brian Wilson, Tony Asher	506 "Far Away Places"	3:09
14.	"I Should Not Be Seeing You" (Connie Conway)	Sterling Davis, Paul Humlie	506 "Far Away Places"	2:52
15.	"You Only Live Twice" (Nancy Sinatra)	Leslie Bricusse, John Barry	513 "The Phantom"	2:45
16.	"Piece of My Heart" (Big Brother and the Holding Company)	Jerry Ragovoy, Bert Berns	610 "A Tale of Two Cities"	4:14
17.	"Both Sides, Now" (Judy Collins)	Joni Mitchell	613 "In Care Of"	3:13
18.	"I'm a Man" (The Spencer Davis Group)	Steve Winwood, Jimmy Miller	701 "Time Zones"	2:56
19.	"This Will Be Our Year" (The Zombies)	Chris White	702 "A Day's Work"	2:06
20.	"My Way" (Frank Sinatra)	Claude François, Jacques Revaux, Paul Anka	706 "The Strategy"	4:34
21.	"The Best Things in Life Are Free" (Robert Morse)	Buddy DeSylva, Lew Brown, Ray Henderson	707 "Waterloo"	1:35
22.	"The First Time Ever I Saw Your Face" (Roberta Flack)	Ewan MacColl	710 "The Forecast"	5:19
23.	"Score Suite 2" (Carbonara)	Carbonara	714 "Person to Person"	4:29
24.	"I'd Like to Teach the World to Sing (In Perfect Harmony)" (The New Seekers)	Bill Backer, Billy Davis, Roger Cook, Roger Greenaway	714 "Person to Person"	2:23
Total length:				75:58
