= I. "Into the Darkness" =

"Into the Darkness"

Movement by Rush

from the album Caress of Steel
- Released: September 24, 1975
- Recorded: July 1975
- Studio: Toronto Sound (Toronto)
- Genre: Progressive rock; acid rock
- Length: 3:47
- Composers: Geddy Lee; Alex Lifeson
- Lyricist: Neil Peart
- Producers: Rush; Terry Brown

"The Necromancer" chronology
I. "Into the Darkness" (1975)	II. "Under the Shadow" (1975)

"Into the Darkness" is the first movement of the suite "The Necromancer", the A-side closer of Canadian rock band Rush's third studio album Caress of Steel (1975). "The Necromancer" was composed by bassist and lead vocalist Geddy Lee and guitarist Alex Lifeson and arranged and produced by the band and Terry Brown. Drummer Neil Peart penned the lyrics of the three-part "short story", based on J. R. R. Tolkien's The Lord of the Rings series (1954–1955). In the opening movement, Peart's effects-painted narration and Lee's singing describe three travelers from Willowdale as they enter the "forbidding lands" of the titular antagonist. Music writers highlighted similarities to the group's eponymous first album in its blues style, as well as its ominous atmosphere, guitar sounds, and Lee's singing.

== Background ==
"The Necromancer", a three-part "short story" with "Into the Darkness" as its first movement, was composed by bassist and vocalist Geddy Lee and guitarist Alex Lifeson. Alongside the side-long "The Fountain of Lamneth", it is one of two epics on the band's third album Caress of Steel, which was recorded for three weeks in July 1975 at Toronto Sound. The album was arranged and produced by Rush and engineer Terry Brown.

== Music ==
"Into the Darkness" was categorized by Ryan Reed as Black Sabbath-style proto-stoner metal, and Ultimate Guitar "whisky-blues". It is performed in 4/4 at a "relentlessly slow" tempo in E minor with a chord progression of Em_{7}–D–Em_{7}–C–G–D/F♯. "Into the Darkness"'s motif has its first two notes an octave apart, its third note a tritone higher than the second. It is an example of Rush's constant utilization of tritones, later heard in the "Monsters!" section of "La Villa Strangiato" (1978) and Moving Pictures (1981) cuts "YYZ" and "Witch Hunt". The movement opens with spooky reversed guitars before airy and spacious half-strummed guitar arpeggios come in, then a slow drum beat; following Lee's 16-measure vocal portion, various "squally" solos from Lifeson interweave with and contrast each other, setting the stage for "Under the Shadow". As Will Romano analyzed the song's reversed guitars, "A forward chorusy/reverb guitar track appearing in the stereo image is answered by a reverse audio squall, then disintegrates into the either like sonic wraiths."

== Lyrics ==
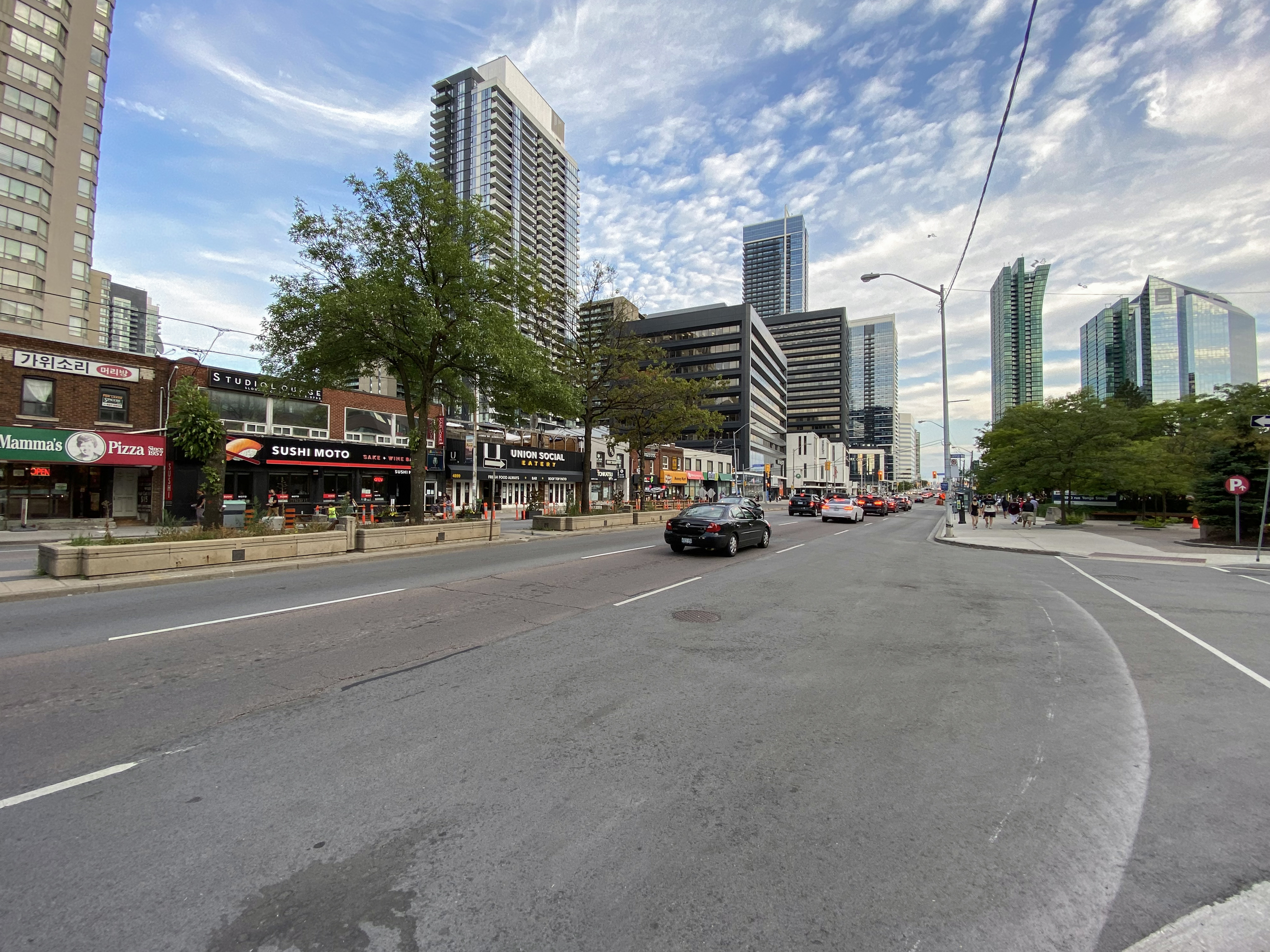
"Into the Darkness" involves "three travellers from Willowdale", a Toronto suburb, entering the Necromancer's forbidding forest.

"As grey traces of dawn tinge the eastern sky," begins Peart's narration, "the three travellers, men of Willowdale, emerge from the forest's shadow. Fording the River Dawn, they turn south, journeying into the dark and forbidding lands of the Necromancer." In The Lord of the Rings, the main villain Sauron is also known as The Necromancer, and the "three travellers" were Sam, Frodo, and Gollum. The "men of Willowdale" also refers to the three band members, who originated from a Toronto suburb of the same name. Robert Telleria suggested their role as travellers in the song was an analogy to their constant touring, as in old fantasy quest tales, travellers were usually restless and only had one destination in mind. "Fording the River Dawn" borrows a common trope in ancient literature where "fording a river" signaled a deciding part of a hero's quest.

The spoken-word section then reveals the three protagonists' physical and mental state deteriorating from the effects of the Necromancer's "dread power". It concludes with a brief summary of the story later on, where they will turn into "empty, mindless specters, stripped of will and soul" and hungry for their revenge against their potential incarcerator. Lee's sung lyrics repeats some of the details of the narration. These include the travellers' southward journey at dawn and the titular antagonist's shadow, which "weighs like iron tears". They also foreshadowed the succeeding events, as "the road is lined with peril" and "the air is charged with fear".

== Release and legacy ==
Caress of Steel was released on September 24, 1975 by Anthem Records. "The Necromancer" closed the vinyl's A-side, where three tracks between three-and-a-half-to-four-and-a-half minutes came before. The lengths of both "Into the Darkness" and "Under the Shadow" were marked incorrectly as 4:20 and 4:25 respectively. 3:47–4:20 includes the spoken word narration and drum roll introducing "Under the Shadow", meaning it was counted as the end of "Into the Darkness"'s timestamp and left out of "Under the Shadow"'s. The CD release maintains the misprinted length of "Under the Shadow" but changes "Into the Darkness" to 4:12, causing the drum roll to not be factored into any of the timestamps.

The entirety of "The Necromancer" was on the set list for the two-month promotional tour of Caress of Steel that ended on January 10, 1976, called by the members "The Down the Tubes Tour". The second inclusion on a tour set list was its last, on the promotional tour for the live album All the World's a Stage (1976). It left out "Into the Darkness"; thus, only "Under the Shadow" and "Return of the Prince" was performed.

== Reception ==
Writers discussed the creepy atmosphere, such as Romano who claimed "Into the Darkness" to be "the most shadowy track Rush recorded in the 1970s". Jordan Hoffman described the effect on Peart's voice as an "eerie horror movie filter", Richard James a "convincing", dramatic, eyebrow-raising thriller film trailer voiceover. In a contemporaneous review of Caress of Steel, Doug Pagano called "Into the Darkness" a "good" "spooky song" with vocabulary "so intense that sometimes the music falls into the background". Less favorably, Adrien Begrand described "Into the Darkness" as a mellow extended intro with a "drowsy" and "lifeless" narration from Peart. James also criticized the repetition of story points established in the spoken-word in Lee's lyrics, and the absence of an explained motivation for the travellers going into the forest.

Ultimate Guitar highlighted the ability of "Into the Darkness" and "Under the Shadow" to maintain the "tasty blues swagger" of the self-titled debut while transitioning into progressive rock. Alex Body described the "atmospheric", "laid-back piece" as a mature version of "Here Again", a seven-minute cut from the debut album, which "gives the music room to breathe and dynamics that make the music's impact far greater".

Romano was intrigued by the mixing, which he referred to as "filmic, but we're also aware we're watching a film". "A patina seems to distance itself from the listener" despite the clean quality of the sounds individually. He also opined the cinematic aspect extended to Lee's "soulful" vocal performance, which reflects the "earthiness" and innocence of the travellers; it contrasts his "raspy scream" in "Under the Shadoow", representative of the "vampiric" Necromancer. Body also gave particular acclaim to Lee's singing, "one of the few times in the band's early material where he performs the lyric with a delicacy and sensitivity that would be apparent later on the band's career".

Writers also frequently brought up the many guitar textures. James called Lifeson's solo near the end "excellent, anguished and full of feel and phrasing". The reverse guitars were also praised for successfully establishing the eerie tone and being a "nice foil" for the other guitar lines. Fates Warning guitarist Jim Matheos, of whom "The Necromancer" is one of his favorite songs, admitted to being captivated by them.
