= Presto (album) =

Studio album by Rush
- Released: November 17, 1989
- Recorded: June–August 1989
- Studios: Le Studio, Morin Heights, Quebec; McClear Place, Toronto, Ontario
- Genres: Pop rock; progressive rock
- Length: 52:11
- Label: Anthem
- Producers: Rush; Rupert Hine

Rush chronology
A Show of Hands (1989)	Presto (1989)	Chronicles (1990)

Singles from Presto
- 1. "Show Don't Tell" Released: November 1989; 2. "The Pass" Released: March 1990

Presto is the thirteenth studio album by Canadian rock band Rush. It was released on November 17, 1989 by Anthem Records and was the band's first album released internationally by Atlantic Records, following the group's departure from Mercury. After the Hold Your Fire (1987) tour ended in 1988, the group members reconvened in December to decide their next step and agreed to take six months off before starting on a new album. Presto marked another change in Rush's sound, with a reduction in synthesizers and a return towards more guitar-driven arrangements.

Presto reached No. 7 in Canada and No. 16 in the United States. "Show Don't Tell," "The Pass" and "Superconductor" were released as singles from Presto; the former charted at No. 1 on the U.S. Album Rock Tracks chart. Rush supported the album with the Presto Tour from February to June 1990. Presto reached gold certification by the Recording Industry Association of America for selling 500,000 copies. The album was remastered in 2004 and 2013, the latter as part of the 2013 box set The Studio Albums 1989–2007. In 2015, it was reissued after being remastered by Sean Magee at Abbey Road Studios, following a direct approach by Rush to remaster their entire back catalogue.

== Background ==
In May 1988, Rush wrapped up touring the band's previous album, Hold Your Fire (1987), which was followed by the band's third live release, A Show of Hands, in early 1989. The group then decided not to renew contracts with international distributor Mercury Records; Lifeson said they departed because the relationship had become stale by this point. Peart later wrote that with the band now "free of deadlines and obligations" for the first time in 15 years, they chose to take advantage by taking a six-month break. In December 1988, the group gathered at Peart's house to discuss the next step and agreed to start a new studio album after the break.

== Writing ==
Work on Presto began with Rush renting a studio in the country to write and rehearse new material. They adopted their usual method of Lifeson and Lee working on music while Peart worked alone on lyrics. Peart wrote: "At the end of the day I might wander into the studio, ice cubes clinking, and listen to what they'd been up to, and if I'd been lucky, show them something new." Rush worked at the studio during the week and returned home on weekends.

Presto marks the beginning of Rush's return to a more guitar-driven sound from what's known to many as the band's "synthesizer period" of the previous four releases. When Lifeson and Lee discussed what musical direction to take, they agreed that the core of the band's sound, emotion, and energy had come from the guitar, something that they wanted to return to for Presto. This resulted in a much more satisfying album for Lifeson. Lifeson had felt constricted in his guitar playing since synthesizers began playing a more dominant role in the songwriting and performance on Signals (1982), which had continued through the 1980s. Lee explained that Rush wanted Presto to be "more of a singer's album, and I think you'll notice that the arrangements musically support the vocal. [...] Neil's lyrics to me are a lot more heartfelt. [...] This album was a real reaction against technology in a sense. I was getting sick and tired of working with computers and synthesizers. [...] We made a pact to stay away from strings, pianos, and organs—to stay away from digital technology. In the end, we couldn't resist using them for colour."

In a contrast to previous albums Grace Under Pressure (1984), Power Windows (1985) and Hold Your Fire, the album does not contain an overall running lyrical theme, or what Peart described as "heavy" lyrical messages, instead adopting a more loose approach with each track making its own statement. Peart used the word "response" to describe the lyrical content as a whole. "The idea that you don't go through life just looking at things. It doesn't matter if you've been all around the world - you may have seen it, but if you haven't felt it, you haven't been there." Peart added: "There are many threads and a strong motif of looking at life today and trying to act inside it."

The album's title was an idea that Rush had considered using for A Show of Hands, but when Peart started writing a song entitled "Presto", it was then used as the title of the album.

== Recording ==
After several songs had been worked out, the band felt it was the right time to present what they had to a co-producer. However, their initial choice, Peter Collins, who'd worked on Power Windows and Hold Your Fire, reluctantly declined the offer to work on Presto, as he wished to produce other bands. Though Rush felt confident enough to undertake production duties themselves, they still wanted someone they could trust and to provide an objective point of view to their ideas. Among the various candidates was English producer, songwriter, and keyboardist Rupert Hine, whose experience with a variety of artists attracted the group. Peart recalled the time when they presented their ideas to Hine: "We were a little bemused [...] at the end of some of them he actually seemed to be laughing! We looked at each other, eyebrows raised as if to say: 'He thinks our songs are funny?' But evidently it was a laugh of pleasure; he stayed 'til the end". At Hine's suggestion, the group brought in Stephen W. Tayler as the recording and mixing engineer. The sessions with Rush and Hine together were productive; initially, 10 days were assigned for pre-production work with one track for each day, but it was complete after just one-and-a-half days.

Presto was recorded from June to August 1989. As part of their deal with Hine, the band agreed to record parts of the album in London. Presto was finished around four weeks ahead of schedule.

When the album was complete, Rush sought a new record deal and signed to Atlantic Records after executive Doug Morris, who had wanted to sign the group for a number of years, made an attractive offer.

== Songs ==
Presto continues the treble-heavy, light progressive rock of Rush's previous two studio albums.

=== Side one ===
"The Pass" concerns a friend of Peart's who joined him on a cycle ride and once discussed juvenile suicide, which inspired the lyrics for the song. Peart named it the song he had worked the hardest on, due to the delicate nature of the subject. The song became a group favorite; Peart cited the track as the reason they would re-record the Presto album, if they could.

"Scars" features a complex drum pattern in which both acoustic and electronic drums are utilized. The pattern was derived from a tribal rhythm Peart heard while on a bicycle tour of Africa (later chronicled in his first book, The Masked Rider: Cycling in West Africa). He went on to incorporate this pattern into his live drum solos. The song also features the use of a sequencer in place of, and often mistaken for, a bass guitar.

Lifeson said the title track is about "feeling more active in your heart than in your head, not having the answers to problems."

=== Side two ===
"Superconductor" deals with the superficiality of mainstream music. That topic also appears in other songs such as "Grand Designs" from the Power Windows album.

In "Anagram (for Mongo)", every line contains one or more words that are formed by using letters in another word from that same line (e.g. "There is no safe seat at the feast"), and certain lines contain anagrammed words (e.g. "Miracles will have their claimers"). Its title was inspired by the character Mongo from the 1974 film Blazing Saddles. Lifeson spoke about the lyrics: "It doesn't mean anything, it was just a fun thing, but there are some great twists in there."

"Hand over Fist" was originally an instrumental that Rush had intended to include on Presto, but Peart continued to submit lyrical ideas to Lifeson and Lee; one in particular fit the music well enough and the plan for an instrumental was scrapped. In the album's tour book, Peart used the symbolism that the hand game "rock, paper, scissors" represents, which was made into a nursery rhyme and used as a lyrical chant in "Hand over Fist."

== Artwork and promotion ==
The album's sleeve was designed by Rush's longtime collaborator Hugh Syme: a black-and-white design depicting a levitating magician's hat on a hill with a rabbit emerging from it. The field in the foreground has many rabbits. Rush had devised its concept and presented it to Syme, who then produced several ideas depicting what they suggested. Lifeson recalled the moment when they saw the design they went with: "We all started laughing hysterically, 'This is great, it's perfect!'"

Rush produced three music videos for Presto: "Show Don't Tell", "The Pass" and "Superconductor".

== Critical reception ==
Professional ratings
Review scores
Source	Rating
AllMusic	2.5/5 stars
The Encyclopedia of Popular Music	2/5 stars
The Essential Rock Discography	5/10
MusicHound Rock	3.5/5 stars
Rolling Stone	3/5 stars
The Rolling Stone Album Guide	2/5 stars
The Virgin Encyclopedia of 80s Music	2/5 stars

Presto received mixed reviews from critics. Gregory Heaney of AllMusic described the album as "workmanlike" and removed from the creativity of their earlier works. However, he asserted that the songs were not terrible, just that something was not quite clicking; this was perhaps due to the length of time it had been since the band wrote more traditional, guitar-based songs. However, before Heaney's review was posted, the site had listed a favorable 4.5 star (out of a possible 5) review of the album by Mackenzie Wilson, who described the album as one that "intelligently leads Rush into the '90s without musical bleakness".

== Track listing ==
All lyrics are written by Neil Peart; all music is composed by Geddy Lee and Alex Lifeson.

Side one
No.	Title	Length
1.	"Show Don't Tell"	5:01
2.	"Chain Lightning"	4:33
3.	"The Pass"	4:52
4.	"War Paint"	5:24
5.	"Scars"	4:07
6.	"Presto"	5:45

Side two
No.	Title	Length
1.	"Superconductor"	4:47
2.	"Anagram (for Mongo)"	4:00
3.	"Red Tide"	4:29
4.	"Hand over Fist"	4:11
5.	"Available Light"	5:03

== Personnel ==
Credits taken from the album's CD liner notes.

Rush

- Geddy Lee – bass guitar, vocals, synthesizers
- Alex Lifeson – electric and acoustic guitars
- Neil Peart – drums, electronic percussion

Additional musicians

- Rupert Hine – additional keyboards and backing vocals
- Jason Sniderman – additional keyboards

Production

- Rush – production, arrangements
- Rupert Hine – production, arrangements
- Stephen W. Tayler – recording engineer, mixing
- Simon Pressey – assistant recording engineer at Le Studio
- Jaques Deveau – assistant recording engineer at Le Studio
- Rick Anderson – assistant recording engineer at McClear Place
- Matt Howe – assistant mixing engineer
- Everett Ravenstein – assistant pre-production engineer
- Bob Ludwig – original mastering
- Scarpati – photography
- Andrew MacNaughtan – portraits
- Hugh Syme – art direction
- Ray Danniels, SRO Productions – management
- Moon Records (Val Azzoli and Liam Birt) – executive production

== Charts ==
=== Weekly charts ===
Chart (1989)	Peak position
Finnish Albums (Suomen virallinen lista)	17
German Albums (Offizielle Top 100)	60
Dutch Albums (Album Top 100)	70
UK Albums (Official Charts)	27
US Billboard 200	16

Chart (2025)	Peak position
Hungarian Physical Albums (MAHASZ)	15

=== Year-end charts ===
Chart (1990)	Position
US Billboard 200	79

== Certifications ==
Region	Certification	Certified units/sales
Canada (Music Canada)	Platinum	100,000^{^}
United Kingdom (BPI)	Silver	60,000^{^}
United States (RIAA)	Gold	500,000^{^}
^{^} Shipments figures based on certification alone.
