= Andrew MacNaughtan =

Canadian photographer and music video director

- Born: Andrew Neil MacNaughtan; 25 February 1964; Toronto, Ontario, Canada
- Died: 25 January 2012 (aged 47); Los Angeles, California, United States
- Occupations: Photographer, music video director
- Years active: 1981–2012

Andrew Neil MacNaughtan (25 February 1964 – 25 January 2012) was a Canadian photographer and music video director.

== Work ==
MacNaughtan won four Juno Awards for his work as a photographer, director and album art designer, including three wins for CD/DVD Artwork Design of the Year in 1995 for Our Lady Peace's album Naveed, in 1998 for Tom Cochrane's Songs of a Circling Spirit and in 2004 for Jann Arden's Love Is the Only Soldier, and one win for Music DVD of the Year for Rush's Rush in Rio in 2004.

Artists for whom MacNaughtan directed music videos included Rush, Great Big Sea, The Gandharvas, Aaron Carter, Michael Bublé and SHeDAISY.

He also launched ArtGivesHope, a charity to help families in Africa affected by HIV/AIDS, in the early 2010s. He published the photography book Grace: Africa in Photographs in 2011 to raise funds for the organization. The charity was inspired by MacNaughtan's work photographing Live8 in 2005.

== Death ==
MacNaughtan died 25 January 2012 of a heart attack in Los Angeles during an assignment with Rush.
