= The Pass (song) =

Single by Rush

from the album Presto
- Released: March 1990
- Recorded: 1989
- Length: 4:51
- Label: Atlantic (except Canada)
- Songwriters: Neil Peart, Alex Lifeson and Geddy Lee
- Producers: Rupert Hine and Rush

Rush singles chronology
"Show Don't Tell" (1989)	"The Pass" (1990)	"Roll the Bones" (1992)

"The Pass" is the second single from Rush's 1989 album Presto. The lyrics by drummer Neil Peart address teenage suicide and the tendency to romanticize it. The song peaked at No. 15 on the U.S. Hot Mainstream Rock Tracks chart, and a music video was made for the song.

The lines "All of us get lost in the darkness/Dreamers learn to steer by the stars/All of us do time in the gutter/Dreamers turn to look at the cars" alludes to Oscar Wilde's "We are all in the gutter, but some of us are looking at the stars" from Act III of his play Lady Windermere's Fan.

On the Rush in Rio DVD (2003), bassist/vocalist Geddy Lee introduces the song to the audience by saying it is one of the band's favorites. On the same DVD, in the documentary "The Boys in Brazil", Peart says he always gets emotional while playing the song, "not only for what it expresses explicitly lyrically, but because it is one of our better crafted ones."

The song was played live on the Presto Tour, Roll the Bones Tour, Vapor Trails Tour, and Clockwork Angels Tour, the latter used as an alternative song to "Bravado". It was also played on the R50 tour.

The song would later be included on Rush's compilation Retrospective 3 (2009).

== Track listing ==
No.	Title	Lyrics	Music	Length
1.	"The Pass"	Peart	Rush	4:51
2.	"Presto"	Peart	Rush	5:45
