= Caress of Steel =

1975 studio album by Rush

- Cover art by Hugh Syme

Studio album by Rush
- Released: September 24, 1975
- Recorded: July 1975
- Studios: Toronto Sound (Toronto, Ontario, Canada)
- Genres: Progressive rock; hard rock
- Length: 44:49
- Label: Mercury
- Producers: Rush; Terry Brown

Rush chronology
Fly by Night (1975)	Caress of Steel (1975)	2112 (1976)

Singles from Caress of Steel
- 1. "Return of the Prince" Released: October 1975; 2. "Lakeside Park" Released: November 1975

Caress of Steel (Note: Stylized in all caps) is the third studio album by Canadian rock band Rush, released on September 24, 1975, by Mercury Records. It was recorded immediately after the band finished a tour in support of their previous album, Fly by Night, and saw the band shift from its early blues-based hard rock style towards progressive rock. Songs such as "The Necromancer" show Rush's move to narrative-driven, fantasy-based compositions, while "The Fountain of Lamneth" was their first prog-rock "epic". "Bastille Day" and "Lakeside Park" became staples of the band's live setlists.

Though the band members were initially proud of their work on Caress of Steel, the album proved a commercial and critical low point for Rush. The album's darker sound and fantastical compositions failed to find an audience and confused some of the band's peers. Poor sales put the band in danger of being dropped by Mercury. The mediocre reception reduced the band's gigging opportunities, leading them to dub the supporting tour the "Down the Tubes Tour".

The album is more positively viewed by the band's fans in retrospect, although Ultimate Classic Rock noted that the album is still considered "the black sheep of their catalog". It was the last Rush album without keyboards or synthesizers until Vapor Trails (2002).

== Background and recording ==
By mid-1975, Rush had stabilised with a line-up of guitarist Alex Lifeson, bassist and vocalist Geddy Lee, and drummer and primary lyricist Neil Peart, who had joined the group in 1974. They released Fly by Night (1975), which marked Rush's first foray into multi-part conceptual songs with "By-Tor and the Snow Dog". (Note: "Before/After" from the self-titled debut, named on the sleeve "Before and After", was Rush's first recorded suite, but not their first conceptual epic.) The group saw a rise in popularity, and received a Juno Award for Most Promising Group. In June 1975, they finished touring Fly by Night, which culminated in a Canadian leg that had them as headliners for the first time.

While preparing their follow-up album, Rush took the extended and conceptual song elements that they had introduced on Fly by Night and made it the central focus for their new material. Their sound began to move from blues-inspired hard rock to progressive rock. Peart recalled that the band approached Caress of Steel feeling "serene and confident" and that all three members were proud of the result. He considered the album a "major step" in their development with its variety of musical dynamics and original ideas. Lee said that the band were "pretty high" while making the album.

The album was recorded in July 1975 at Toronto Sound Studios in Toronto, Ontario. Mixing took place in the same studio.

== Songs ==
=== Side one ===
"Bastille Day" concerns the storming of the Bastille during the French Revolution.

According to Geddy Lee, "I Think I'm Going Bald" was inspired by the Kiss song, "Goin' Blind", and Alex Lifeson's insecurities about losing his hair.

"Lakeside Park" is about the park of the same name in Port Dalhousie, St. Catharines, Ontario, where Peart grew up and worked during the summer as a teenager.

"The Necromancer" is a 12-minute track in three parts. It concerns a necromancer, someone who practices necromancy, a type of divination involving the summoning of spirits of the deceased. The song was influenced by the works of author J. R. R. Tolkien; the necromancer is an alias used by the character Sauron in Tolkien's novel The Hobbit (1937).

The introduction contains the lyric, "Three travelers, men of Willow Dale", a reference to the band itself, as Lifeson had formed the first incarnation of Rush in the Toronto suburb of Willowdale. The final section, "Return of the Prince", sees the return of the character By-Tor from the song "By-Tor and the Snow Dog" on Fly by Night, but in "The Necromancer", the character is a hero and not a villain. "Return of the Prince" was released as a single in Canada.

=== Side two ===
"The Fountain of Lamneth" was the first of the band's three side-filling tracks, the others being the title track of 2112 in 1976 and "Cygnus X-1, Book II: Hemispheres" from Hemispheres in 1978. The six-part "Fountains" tells the story of a man in search of the Fountain of Lamneth. The second part, "Didacts and Narpets", consists mostly of a drum solo. In 1991, Peart said that the shouted words heard are an argument between the central character and the Didacts (teachers) and Narpets (anagram of "parents"). He could not remember what the words were, "but they took up opposite positions like: 'Work! Live! Earn! Give!' and like that."

== Cover ==
The album cover for Caress of Steel was intended to be printed in a silver colour to give it a "steel" appearance. A printing error resulted in giving the album cover a gold colour. This error has never been corrected on subsequent printings of the album. The cover artwork for Caress of Steel was designed by Hugh Syme, the first Rush album to feature his work. Syme has designed the cover artwork for every Rush album since.

On the inside gatefold of the album, just below the lyrics to "The Necromancer", the Latin phrase "Terminat hora diem; terminat auctor opus" appears, which translates (loosely) to:

"[as] The hour ends the day; the author ends his work."

The source of this phrase is Christopher Marlowe's play Doctor Faustus (1592).

== Release ==
Caress of Steel was released on September 24, 1975. By March 1976, it had sold around 40,000 copies in Canada. Although the band initially had high hopes for the album, it sold fewer copies than Fly by Night and was considered a disappointment by the record company. The album eventually became known as one of Rush's most obscure and overlooked recordings.

The album was released in Europe in March 1976.

Due to poor sales, low concert attendance, and overall media indifference, the band dubbed the 1975–76 tour supporting Caress of Steel the "Down the Tubes" tour. That, in addition to the record company's pressure to record more accessible, radio-friendly material similar to their first album – something Lee, Lifeson and Peart were unwilling to do – made the trio fear that the end of the group was near. Ignoring their record label's advice and vowing to "fight or fall", the following year's 2112 album would pave the way for lasting commercial success, despite opening with a 20-and-a-half-minute conceptual title track.

Caress of Steel did not attain gold certification in the United States until December 1993, nearly two decades after its release. It remains one of the few Rush albums to not go platinum in the United States.

The complete album, along with the self-titled debut and Fly by Night, was included as part of the 1978 Anthem release Archives.

== Reception ==
Professional retrospective ratings
Review scores
Source	Rating
AllMusic	2/5 stars
Collector's Guide to Heavy Metal	6/8
The Daily Vault	C+
The Essential Rock Discography	5/10
The Encyclopedia of Popular Music	2/5 stars
MusicHound Rock	2.5/5 stars
The Rolling Stone Album Guide	2/5 stars
Sputnikmusic	4.0/5
The Virgin Encyclopedia of 80s Music	2/5 stars

Caress of Steel received mixed reviews from professional critics. AllMusic's Greg Prato described the album as "one of Rush's more unfocused albums", while Daily Vault's Christopher Thelen called it "a tentative step for Rush, one which would lead to their masterpiece in conceptual work", in reference to the group's next album, 2112. Stereogum, in 2014, ranked it the second-worst studio album by Rush, just above Test for Echo (1996).

== Remasters ==
A remaster was issued on CD in 1997.

- The tray has a picture of the star with man painting (mirroring the cover art of Retrospective I) with "The Rush Remasters" printed in all capital letters just to the left. All remasters from Rush through Permanent Waves (1980) are like this.
- The remaster adds the album's back cover and gatefold (which included band pictures and lyrics) to the packaging which was not included on the original CD.

Caress of Steel was remastered again in 2011 by Andy VanDette for the "Sector" box sets, which re-released all of Rush's Mercury-era albums. Caress Of Steel is included in the Sector 1 set.

Caress of Steel was remastered for vinyl in 2015 as a part of the official "12 Months of Rush" promotion. The high definition master prepared for this release was also made available for purchase in 24-bit/96 kHz and 24-bit/192 kHz formats, at several high-resolution audio online music stores. These masters have significantly less dynamic range compression than the 1997 remasters and the "Sector" remasters by Andy VanDette.

== Track listing ==
All tracks are written by Geddy Lee, Alex Lifeson, and Neil Peart, except "Panacea" and "Bacchus Plateau" by Lee and Peart.

Side one
No.	Title	Length
1.	"Bastille Day"	4:36
2.	"I Think I'm Going Bald"	3:35
3.	"Lakeside Park"	4:07
4.	"The Necromancer" I. "Into the Darkness" (4:20) II. "Under the Shadow" (4:25) III. "Return of the Prince" (3:51)	12:36

Side two
No.	Title	Length
1.	"The Fountain of Lamneth" I. "In the Valley" (4:17) II. "Didacts and Narpets" (1:00) III. "No One at the Bridge" (4:15) IV. "Panacea" (3:12) V. "Bacchus Plateau" (3:12) VI. "The Fountain" (3:48)	19:44

Note: Cassette pressings swap the positions of "I Think I'm Going Bald" and "Didacts and Narpets".

== Personnel ==
Rush

- Geddy Lee – vocals, bass
- Alex Lifeson – 6 and 12-string electric and acoustic guitars, classical guitar, steel guitar
- Neil Peart – drums, percussion, spoken word on "The Necromancer"

Production

- Rush – production, arrangements
- Terry Brown – production, arrangements, engineering, mixing
- Gilbert Kong at Masterdisk – original mastering
- Terrance Bert – photography
- Gerard Gentil – photography
- Barry McVicker – photography
- Hugh Syme – graphics
- AGI – art direction
- Ray Danniels and Vic Wilson, SRO Productions – management
- Moon Records – executive production

== Charts ==
Chart (1975)	Peak position
Canada Top Albums/CDs (RPM)	60
US Billboard 200	148

== Certifications ==
Region	Certification	Certified units/sales
Canada (Music Canada)	Gold	50,000^{^}
United States (RIAA)	Gold	500,000^{^}
^{^} Shipments figures based on certification alone.
