= Bastille Day (song) =

Single by Rush

from the album Caress of Steel
- A-side: "Lakeside Park"
- Released: 1975
- Recorded: 1975
- Studio: Toronto Sound (Toronto)
- Genre: Heavy metal; progressive rock; hard rock; progressive metal
- Length: 4:37
- Label: Mercury
- Songwriter: Rush
- Producers: Rush; Terry Brown

"Bastille Day" is a song by the Canadian rock band Rush; it is the opening track from their third album, Caress of Steel. Like most Rush songs, the music was written by Geddy Lee and Alex Lifeson, and the lyrics by Neil Peart. The song uses the storming of the Bastille, which began the French Revolution, as an allegory for revolutionary fervour needed in the struggle against tyrannical government.

Musically, the song shares a number of features to the band's earlier songs "Working Man" ("powerful chords" and 4/4 time), as well as "Anthem" (an opening guitar riff not repeated later on) – all three songs use a heavier rock sound with neither keyboards nor acoustic guitar. On the other hand, "Bastille Day" employs more complicated rhythms and chord switches. The lyrics discuss revolution, wealth and power, and the potential corruption of even democracy towards authoritarianism. The lyrics also refer to the beheading of the king; the chorus, the method of execution ("La guillotine will claim her bloody prize"). The title of the album, Caress of Steel, "presumably" refers to the guillotine.

Progressive metal band Dream Theater, originally known as "Majesty," took their original name from founding drummer Mike Portnoy's description of the ending of "Bastille Day" as "majestic."

== Personnel ==
- Geddy Lee — vocals, bass
- Alex Lifeson — guitar
- Neil Peart — drums

== See also ==
- List of Rush songs
