= Show Don't Tell =

Single by Rush

from the album Presto
- B-side: "Red Tide"
- Released: November 1989
- Recorded: 1989
- Genre: Progressive rock; hard rock; funk rock; proto-math rock
- Length: 5:01; 4:17 (single edit)
- Label: Atlantic
- Composers: Alex Lifeson; Geddy Lee
- Lyricist: Neil Peart
- Producers: Rupert Hine; Rush

Rush singles chronology
"Closer to the Heart (live)" (1989)	"Show Don't Tell" (1989)	"The Pass" (1990)

"Show Don't Tell" is the first single on Canadian rock band Rush's 1989 album Presto. The song peaked at number one on the U.S. Hot Mainstream Rock Tracks Chart, the second of five songs by Rush to top the chart.

== Music and song structure ==
"Show Don't Tell" illustrates Rush's move away from synthesizer in favour of a more guitar-oriented approach; the band favoured a more funk/groove style of play and away from the 1980s style of music typical on Power Windows and Hold Your Fire, the two preceding albums. In Rush's music of the late 1970s and early 1980s, their progressive rock is indicated by asymmetric time signatures and lyrics fitting into a concept album, and in "Show Don't Tell", their progressive rock is shown by using a very complex riff played in unison by the members of the band. The band chose to use more funk by using extended chord tones, a dramatic pause eighteen seconds into the song and other methods as well.

The funkier song structure proved to be difficult for Neil Peart when he played the drums for the song. He explained in Canadian Musician:

"Show Don't Tell" begins with a syncopated guitar riff that appears two or three times throughout the song. That was about the hardest thing for me to find the right pattern for. I wanted to maintain a groove and yet follow the bizarre syncopations that the guitar riff was leading into. It was demanding technically, but at the same time, because of that, we were determined that it should have a rhythmic groove under it. It's not enough for us to produce a part that's technically demanding; it has to have an overwhelming significance musically. So it had to groove into the rest of the song and it had to have a pulse to it that was apart from what we were playing.

Mojo's James McNair categorized "Show Don't Tell" as a proto-math rock song, an exception to the album's focus on basic song structure.

== Lyrics ==
As is the case with a vast majority of Rush songs, Peart wrote the lyrics for this song. In an interview, he explained that "Show Don't Tell" is an example of his trend from the album Grace Under Pressure onward from writing concepts and abstractions to a more concrete, first-person viewpoint, or as he noted when interviewed a perspective with a "stance and a good attitude". Peart alternates between narration and a first person perspective as he writes about confronting a person who has fooled the protagonist of the song too often. Peart's philosophy throughout the song is epitomized with the very no-nonsense lyric "You can twist perception. Reality won't budge!" The first verse explains the frustration of depending on others and finding out that is the wrong approach (e.g. "Everyone knows everything, and no one's ever wrong, until later. Who can you believe?").

The chorus shows the protagonist's resolution to being fooled: stop listening to the schemer's persuasion, pay attention only if the schemer shows evidence, rather than being convinced by conniving words.

The second verse uses vivid imagery of a courtroom trial as the solution to the protagonist's; however, in this case, the deceived protagonist is the "judge and the jury". After the second verse and chorus, an instrumental section features a bass solo by Geddy Lee and a shorter guitar solo by Alex Lifeson. The chorus in the last section uses more courtroom imagery and then alternates lines from the chorus between the two verses and the chorus using courtroom imagery.

== Track listing ==
Music by Lifeson, Peart, and Lee. Lyrics by Peart.

Canadian Release:

1. Show Don't Tell (Edit) - 4:17
2. Red Tide - 4:29
3. Force Ten (live) - 4:50

US Promo:

1. Show Don't Tell - 5:01

== See also ==
- List of Rush songs
- List of number-one mainstream rock hits (United States)
