= Vapor Trails =

Studio album by Rush
- Released: May 14, 2002
- Recorded: August–December 2001
- Studios: Reaction, Toronto
- Genres: Hard rock; progressive rock
- Length: 67:15
- Label: Anthem
- Producers: Rush; Paul Northfield

Rush chronology
Different Stages (1998)	Vapor Trails (2002)	The Spirit of Radio: Greatest Hits 1974–1987 (2003)

Singles from Vapor Trails
- 1. "One Little Victory" Released: March 29, 2002; 2. "Secret Touch" Released: July 10, 2002

Vapor Trails is the seventeenth studio album by Canadian rock band Rush. It was released on May 14, 2002, on Anthem Records, and was their first studio release since Test for Echo (1996), the longest gap between two Rush albums. After the Test For Echo tour finished in July 1997, drummer and lyricist Neil Peart suffered the loss of his daughter and then his wife in separate tragedies. As a result, the group entered an extended hiatus during which it was not certain they would continue. They eventually reunited in January 2001 to rehearse material for a new album, recording for which lasted until December. For the first and only time since Caress of Steel (1975), Rush did not use any keyboards or synthesizers in their music; the band incorporated many layers of guitar, bass and drums instead.

Vapor Trails reached No. 3 in Canada and No. 6 in the United States. "One Little Victory" was released as the album's lead single in March 2002 and went to No. 10 on the Billboard Mainstream Rock chart in the United States. The next single was "Secret Touch". The album went gold in Canada in August 2002. The Vapor Trails Tour lasted from June through November 2002, which saw the band play to the largest crowds of its career in Brazil. Following the band's dissatisfaction with the album's overall production, two tracks were remixed for the Retrospective III: 1989–2008 compilation album. The positive feedback from this resulted in the entire Vapor Trails album being remixed by David Bottrill and released on September 30, 2013, as Vapor Trails Remixed, both as a separate release and as part of The Studio Albums 1989–2007.

== Background ==
After Rush finished their Test for Echo Tour in July 1997, the group entered a five-year hiatus following the personal tragedies in drummer Neil Peart's life, losing his daughter Selena in August 1997 and wife Jackie in June 1998. Peart took a hiatus and rode around North America on a motorcycle, covering 88,000 km (55,000 mi). At some point in his journey, Peart decided to return to the band. In his book Ghost Rider: Travels on the Healing Road, Peart writes of how he had told his bandmates at Selena's funeral, "consider me retired." However, in October 2000, after a period of recuperation, Lee announced during promotional interviews for his solo album My Favourite Headache that Rush were to get together in the following January with the intention to write and rehearse material for a new studio album. Lee said that the album was not made for simply new music, but for "the psychological health and welfare of all the people who have gone through a very difficult time."

== Writing and recording ==
The trio gathered at Reaction Studios in Toronto on January 9, 2001, but did not play anything for three weeks. They discussed what they wanted to achieve and how the album should take shape. Lifeson said it was to get "a feel for each other's frame of mind. We needed to see if everybody was really up for it." Lee and Lifeson said that they chose the studio based on its "artist friendly environment, that was very comfortable and accommodating". Among the topics discussed was the album's musical direction which became a source of difficulty as initially, there was little agreement on what it should be. Upon reaching a consensus, Lifeson said the three found common ground "on every aspect of the recording."

The band started working, adopting a three-week-on, one-week-off schedule with no one present apart from a technical assistant. The group was hopeful there was still chemistry amongst them to make an album. They adopted their usual method of writing with Lee and Lifeson working together on musical ideas in the studio control room while Peart worked elsewhere on the lyrics, this time using a pen, paper and a computer. Peart wrote about their attitude towards the sessions: "We laid out no parameters, no goals, no limitations, only that we would take a relaxed, civilized approach." Peart looked through his scrapbook of notes and phrases he'd collected and explored ways of connecting them together to form a complete lyrical idea. Lee and Lifeson developed ideas largely through jam sessions typically kicked off by setting a pattern on a drum machine and playing along, recording every session using Logic Pro. This was to avoid making a demo tape of a collection of songs and re-record them at a later point. This way, early takes became the basis of the songs which kept the music fresh using as many original takes where possible.

After several weeks Peart presented the ideas he'd formed, but Lee and Lifeson had not put down any concrete pieces of music. Peart recalled they were not yet "serious" and still wanted to play and explore ideas as sifting through what they had put to tape was a tedious process and disrupted their creative flow. Peart had completed six sets of lyrics at this point but was not getting feedback from his bandmates as he had before, so he paused on lyrics and focused on his book Ghost Rider: Travels on the Healing Road. The three became dissatisfied with what they'd come up with and thought it was too forced, which led to their decision to take some weeks off. They did so, and returned feeling refreshed and more focused, and were able to work out complete songs, not just sections. The songs that emerged from these early jams were "Peaceable Kingdom," "Ceiling Unlimited" and "Nocturne," all of which still contain some parts put down from the original takes, in their final form. According to Lifeson, no tracks were completely re-recorded.

Vapor Trails is the first album since Caress of Steel (1975) not to feature keyboards. Lifeson had often worried about the presence of keyboards on previous Rush albums, but this time Lee had agreed not to use them. Lifeson therefore spent a greater amount of time devising guitar parts that were "richer on tonality and harmonic quality", adequate for the background tracks. He also avoided sound effects on his guitar, to achieve a more raw sound. At certain points in recording his drum parts, Peart had been influenced by Who drummer Keith Moon and played in his style of more lyrical drumming, rather than simply keeping the beat.

After taking a break in June 2001, Rush began to record their new songs in mid-August. Initially they decided to write 13 tracks for the album and pick the best 10 or 11 for the final selection, but when the time arrived they agreed to include all of them. They were joined by English producer Paul Northfield, who had worked on several previous Rush albums and assisted in the arrangement to some tracks when the group felt stuck. The band are credited as co-producers. In December 2001, the group left the Reaction Studios and started mixing the album at Metalworks Studios with David Leonard. The mixing was complete in March 2002, after which it was sent to Masterdisk in New York City for mastering by Howie Weinberg. Rush chose him having liked the sound of the other albums that Weinberg had worked on.

== Reception ==
Professional ratings
Aggregate scores
Source	Rating
Metacritic	75/100
Review scores
Source	Rating
AllMusic	3/5 stars
The Austin Chronicle	3/5 stars
Blender	3/5 stars
E! Online	B+
Entertainment Weekly	B+
The Encyclopedia of Popular Music	4/5 stars
The Essential Rock Discography	5/10
PopMatters	9/10
Q	3/5 stars
Rolling Stone	3/5 stars
The Virgin Encyclopedia of 80s Music	4/5 stars

The production of Vapor Trails has been criticized by the band themselves, critics and fans alike because of the album's "loud" sound quality. It has overly compressed (clipped) audio levels during mastering, which generates additional digital distortion during the CD production. The trend, known as the loudness war, was very common on modern CD production at the time. Alex Lifeson stated:

It was a contest, and it was mastered too high, and it crackles, and it spits, and it just crushes everything. All the dynamics get lost, especially anything that had an acoustic guitar in it.

Past Prime described the album as "speaker-rattling loud. It's a sound created on the heels of Tool and Korn. And while 'Vapor Trails' never goes full nu metal, the guitars are occasionally shrill, the bass sometimes sounds like bongwater and the distortion is plainly aggressive."

Billboard gave a favorable review.

== Vapor Trails Remixed ==
Vapor Trails Remixed is a remixed version of Vapor Trails mixed by David Bottrill. The album was released by Atlantic Records and Rhino Entertainment on September 30, 2013, and entered at No. 35 on the Billboard 200 chart. The band had been unhappy with the original album's overall sonic production. Influenced by the positive reaction to the remixes of "One Little Victory" and "Earthshine" featured on Retrospective III by Richard Chycki, Rush and Bottrill remixed the entire album. In an interview with Modern Guitars, Lifeson remarked that, since the remixes were so good, there had been talk of doing an entire remix of the album. Vapor Trails Remixed peaked in the US Billboard Charts at number 35.

Vapor Trails Remixed is also included in the box-set of Atlantic Studio Albums called The Studio Albums 1989–2007, in lieu of the original version.

== Track listing ==
All lyrics are written by Neil Peart; all music is composed by Geddy Lee and Alex Lifeson.

No.	Title	Length
1.	"One Little Victory"	5:08
2.	"Ceiling Unlimited"	5:28
3.	"Ghost Rider"	5:41
4.	"Peaceable Kingdom"	5:23
5.	"The Stars Look Down"	4:28
6.	"How It Is"	4:05
7.	"Vapor Trail"	4:57
8.	"Secret Touch"	6:34
9.	"Earthshine"	5:38
10.	"Sweet Miracle"	3:40
11.	"Nocturne"	4:49
12.	"Freeze" (Part IV of "Fear")	6:21
13.	"Out of the Cradle"	5:03

== Personnel ==
Credits taken from the 2002 and 2013 liner notes.

Rush

- Geddy Lee – bass guitar, vocals
- Alex Lifeson – electric and acoustic guitars, mandola
- Neil Peart – drums, cymbals

Production

- Rush – production, recording
- Paul Northfield – production, recording
- Chris Stringer – assistant recording engineer
- David Leonard – mixing
- Joel Kazmi – mixing assistance
- Howie Weinberg – original mastering
- Roger Lian – additional mastering and sequencing
- David Bottrill – 2013 remix
- Andy VanDette – original mastering of 2013 remix
- Hugh Syme – art direction, paintings and portraits

== Charts ==
=== Weekly charts ===
Weekly chart performance for Vapor Trails
Chart (2002)	Peak position
Canadian Albums (Billboard)	3
Dutch Albums (Album Top 100)	47
Finnish Albums (Suomen virallinen lista)	11
French Albums (SNEP)	150
German Albums (Offizielle Top 100)	20
Swedish Albums (Sverigetopplistan)	18
UK Albums (Official Charts)	38
US Billboard 200	6

=== Year-end charts ===
Year-end chart performance for Vapor Trails
Chart (2002)	Position
Canadian Albums (Nielsen SoundScan)	172
Canadian Metal Albums (Nielsen SoundScan)	27

== Certifications ==
Region	Certification	Certified units/sales
Canada (Music Canada)	Gold	50,000^{^}
^{^} Shipments figures based on certification alone.
