= Secret Touch =

Single by Rush

from the album Vapor Trails
- Released: July 10, 2002
- Recorded: 2001
- Genre: Progressive rock, hard rock
- Length: 6:34
- Label: Anthem (Canada); Anthem/Atlantic
- Songwriters: Neil Peart, Geddy Lee, Alex Lifeson
- Producers: Rush and Paul Northfield

Rush singles chronology
"One Little Victory" (2002)	"Secret Touch" (2002)	"Summertime Blues" (2004)

"Secret Touch" is a song by Canadian rock band Rush, and is the eighth track from the band's 2002 studio album, Vapor Trails. It has been revealed to be one of singer Geddy Lee's favorite tracks from the album. It was released as the second single from Vapor Trails, reaching #25 on the US Mainstream Rock chart.

In an interview in the magazine Bass Player in July 2002, Geddy Lee talked about the song:

"This is a bit of an extravaganza. We built the song around these repeating bass chords that I thought sounded like French horns. The tune has a hypnotic feel, and because we weren't happy just enjoying that feel, we had to smack it up with some power. When we get to the middle section and all hell breaks loose, there are these stuttering bass punctuations. I double-tracked them, but on one of the tracks I went in and digitally truncated the notes to make them sound really abrupt and punchy."

He also further said:

"There's another point where I'm playing straight 16th-notes, and when we were jamming originally, we could hear the sound of my fingers slapping against the string-but when we played it back it didn't have the same 'smack'. So we put up a mike and recorded the sound of my fingers while we were laying down the parts, and we used it subtly in the mix. I don't know how much of it survived under all the guitars, but it's there."

== Track listing ==
No.	Title	Lyrics	Music	Length
1.	"Secret Touch" (Radio Edit)	Peart	Rush	4:47
2.	"Secret Touch"	Peart	Rush	6:34

== See also ==
- List of Rush songs
