= One Little Victory =

2002 single by Rush

Single by Rush

from the album Vapor Trails
- Released: March 29, 2002
- Recorded: 2001
- Genre: Hard rock; alternative metal
- Length: 5:08
- Label: Anthem (Canada); Anthem/Atlantic
- Songwriter: Rush
- Producers: Rush; Paul Northfield

Rush singles chronology
"Resist" (1997)	"One Little Victory" (2002)	"Secret Touch" (2002)

Audio sample
- "One Little Victory": file; help

"One Little Victory" is a song by Canadian rock band Rush. It is the opening track on their seventeenth studio album Vapor Trails (2002), and was released as the lead single on March 29, 2002. The music was done by Geddy Lee and Alex Lifeson, and the lyrics by Neil Peart. The title phrase was inspired by a line from Joni Mitchell's "Sunny Sunday." To herald the band's comeback after a five-year hiatus, the single was designed to grab the attention of listeners with its rapid guitar and drum tempos.

A remixed version of "One Little Victory" appears on the compilation album Retrospective 3 (2009). It was later remixed again for Vapor Trails Remixed (2013), following the positive reception of the first remix. The song also appears in the soundtrack for the video game Need for Speed: Hot Pursuit 2, released in 2002.

== Track listing ==
No.	Title	Lyrics	Music	Length
1.	"One Little Victory"	Peart	Lee, Lifeson	5:08

== See also ==
- List of Rush songs
