= Anthem Records discography =

Anthem Records discography

== Catalog number formats and distribution ==
The catalog number formats listed below apply to the majority of Anthems releases since 1977. Singles and promos follow different rules; there are also a few oddities listed at the bottom. Also, Columbia House and BMG Direct versions of Anthem Products do not follow the formats listed below consistently.

=== Under Polydor ===
Anthem officially formed in May 1977. Initially, the label was distributed by Polydor (now a part of Universal), but that only lasted until March 1978. During that time, release numbers 1001 to 1012 (possible 1013 as well) were issued with the catalog number format ANR-Z-XXXX (vinyl) and 8AN-Z-XXXX (8-track) where Z is either the number of discs or sides (for vinyl) and the X's represent the release number.

=== Under Capitol-EMI ===
Beginning in March 1978 until October 1989, Anthem was distributed by Capitol-EMI (now Capitol Records; also now a part of Universal). During this time, budget vinyl reissues of some titles were released with the catalog number format ANR-Z-6XX where Z is either the number of discs of the number of sides and the X's represent the last two digits of the release number. Budget versions appear for at least the first twelve releases (possibly more).

During this time, 8-tracks were replaced with cassettes; further the catalog number format became 4AN-Z-XXXX. Also during this time, the first Anthem compact discs were introduced with the catalog number format ANC-Z-XXXX.

=== Under CBS/Sony ===
Beginning in October 1989 until October 1995, Anthem was distributed by CBS (under Sony). Under CBS/Sony various catalog number formats were introduced to represent different price codes: ANK-XXXX, VANK-XXXX and WANK-XXXX (the V and W indicate budget versions).

=== Under MCA/Universal ===
Universal is Anthem Record's current distributor and has been since October 1995 (initially as MCA). Since the label had become even more "Rush-centric", catalog number formats used were: ANMD-XXXX for Rush releases and ANBD-XXXX for non-Rush releases.

Beginning in 1999 with Queensrÿche's Q2K, the current Anthem catalog number format was introduced: 66825-XXXX-Y where Y describes the format and the X's are, once again, the release number. This format sometimes appears with spaces instead of dashes, or as one undivided number. This number is derived from the barcode prefix that Anthem had been using since at least the eighties.

== Releases ==
=== Main ===
Cat. No.	Artist	Title	Year	Notes
1001	Rush	Rush	1977	Originally released on Mercury in 1974
1002	Rush	Fly by Night	1977	Originally released on Mercury in 1975
1003	Rush	Caress of Steel	1977	Originally released on Mercury in 1975
1004	Rush	2112	1977	Originally released on Mercury in 1976
1005	Rush	All the World's a Stage	1977	Originally released on Mercury in 1976
1006	Max Webster	Max Webster	1977	Originally released on Taurus Records in 1976
1007	Max Webster	High Class in Borrowed Shoes	1977	
1008	A Foot in Coldwater	Breaking Through	1977	
1010	Rush	A Farewell to Kings	1978	
1011	Aerial	In the Middle of the Night	1978	
1012	Max Webster	Mutiny Up My Sleeve	1978	
1013	Rush	Archives	1978	
1014	Rush	Hemispheres	1978	
1015	Rush	Hemispheres	1978	Red vinyl
1016	Wireless	Positively Human, Relatively Sane	1978	
1017	Rush	Hemispheres	1978	Picture disc
1018	Max Webster	A Million Vacations	1979	
1019	Max Webster	Live Magnetic Air	1979	
1020	B.B. Gabor	B.B. Gabor	1980	
1021	Rush	Permanent Waves	1980	
1022	Ian Thomas	Glider	1980	Originally released on GRT Records.
1023	Moe Koffman	Back to Bach	1980	
1024	Ian Thomas	The Best of Ian Thomas	1980	
1025	Wireless	No Static	1980	
1026	Aerial	Maneuvers	1980	
1027	Max Webster	Universal Juveniles	1980	
1028	Bob Segarini	Vox Populi	1980	
1030	Rush	Moving Pictures	1981	
1032	Ian Thomas	The Runner	1981	
1033	Max Webster	Diamonds Diamonds	1981	
1034	B.B. Gabor	Girls of the Future	1981	
1035	Rush	Exit...Stage Left	1981	
1036	Bob & Doug McKenzie	Great White North	1981	
1037	Coney Hatch	Coney Hatch	1982	
1038	Rush	Signals	1982	
1039	Moe Koffman	Best of Moe Koffman	1983	
1040	Boys Brigade	Boys Brigade	1983	
1041	Coney Hatch	Outta Hand	1983	
1042	Bob & Doug McKenzie	Strange Brew: The Adventures of Bob & Doug Mckenzie	1983	
1043	Moe Koffman	Best of Moe Koffman Vol. 2	1983	
1044	Ian Thomas	Riders on Dark Horses	1984	
1045	Rush	Grace Under Pressure	1984	
1046	Coney Hatch	Friction	1985	
1047	Ian Thomas	Add Water	1985	
1048	The Wankers	Guide to Canada	1985	
1049	Rush	Power Windows	1985	
1050	Spoons	Bridges Over Borders	1986	
1051	Rush	Hold Your Fire	1987	
1052	Images in Vogue	The Spell	1988	
1053	Malcolm Burn	Redemption	1988	
1054	Spoons	Vertigo Tango	1989	
1055	Rush	A Show of Hands	1989	
1056	Mendelson Joe	Born to Cuddle	1988	
1057	Moe Koffman	Best of Moe Koffman Vol 1 & 2	1989	
1058	Max Webster	The Best of Max Webster	1989	
1059	Rush	Presto	1989	
1060	Rush	Chronicles	1990	Whole release
1061	Rush	Chronicles	1990	Tape 1
1062	Rush	Chronicles	1990	Tape 2
1063	Mendelson Joe	Addicted	1991	
1064	Rush	Roll the Bones	1991	
1065	Coney Hatch	Best of Three	1992	
1066	Deadbeat Honeymooners	Deadbeat Honeymooners	1992	
1067	Rush	Counterparts	1993	
1068	Ian Thomas	Looking Back	1993	
1069	Psycho Circus	Scarred	1993	
1070	Coney Hatch	Friction	1996	
1071	Buddy Rich Big Band	Burning For Buddy	1997	
1072	Victor	Victor	1996	
1073	Rush	Test for Echo	1996	
1074	Buddy Rich Big Band	Burning for Buddy Volume 2	1997	
1075	Rush	Rush	1997	Rush Remasters Series
1076	Rush	Fly By Night	1997	Rush Remasters Series
1077	Rush	Caress of Steel	1997	Rush Remasters Series
1078	Rush	2112	1997	Rush Remasters Series
1079	Rush	A Farewell to Kings	1997	Rush Remasters Series
1080	Rush	Hemispheres	1997	Rush Remasters Series
1081	Rush	Permanent Waves	1997	Rush Remasters Series
1082	Rush	Moving Pictures	1997	Rush Remasters Series
1083	Rush	Signals	1997	Rush Remasters Series
1084	Rush	Grace Under Pressure	1997	Rush Remasters Series
1085	Rush	Power Windows	1997	Rush Remasters Series
1086	Rush	Hold Your Fire	1997	Rush Remasters Series
1087	Rush	Retrospective I	1997	
1088	Rush	Retrospective II	1998	
1089	Rush	All the World's a Stage	1997	Rush Remasters Series
1090	Rush	Exit...Stage Left	1997	Rush Remasters Series
1091	Rush	A Show of Hands	1997	Rush Remasters Series
1092	Rush	Different Stages	1998	
1093	Queensrÿche	Q2K	1999	
1094	Geddy Lee	My Favourite Headache	2000	
1095	Rush	Chronicles	2001	DVD
1096	Rush	Vapor Trails	2001	
1097	Rush	The Spirit of Radio: Greatest Hits 1974–1987	2003	Includes Bonus DVD
1098	Rush	The Spirit of Radio: Greatest Hits 1974–1987	2003	
1099	Rush	Rush in Rio	2003	DVD (fold out packaging)
2000	Rush	Rush in Rio	2003	CD
2001	Rush	Feedback	2004	
2002	Rush	R30: 30th Anniversary World Tour	2005	Deluxe edition
2003	Rush	R30: 30th Anniversary World Tour	2005	
2004	Rush	Exit...Stage Left		DVD
2005	Rush	Grace Under Pressure		
2006	Rush	A Show of Hands	2007	DVD
2007	Rush	Rush Replay X 3	2006	
2008	Rush	Gold	2006	
2010	Various	Trailer Park Boys: The Movie Soundtrack	2006	
2011	Rush	Rush In Rio		DVD (small case)
2012	Rush	Snakes & Arrows		
2049	Rush	Snakes & Arrows Live		CD
2065	Rush	Snakes & Arrows Live		DVD
2072	Rush	Retrospective 3	2009	CD
2073	Rush	Retrospective 3	2009	CD/DVD
2115	Spinnerette	Spinnerette	2009	CD
2116	Spinnerette	Spinnerette	2009	LP
2117	The Reason	Fools	2010	LP

=== Other ===
Cat. No.	Artist	Title	Year	Notes
ANR-1-0101	Frank Zirone	Zero-One!	1980	
ANM-1-5001	Kim Mitchell	Kim Mitchell	1982	Mini-LP
ANM-1-50012	Clean Slate	Clean Slate!	1988	Mini-LP
AN12-001	Images in Vogue	"So Careful (Extended Mix)"	1988	12" single
ANCS-001	Rush	"Show Don't Tell"	1989	Cassette single
ANCS-002	Rush	"The Pass"	1989	Cassette single
ANCS-003	Rush	"Roll the Bones"	1991	Cassette single
ANCS-004	Northern Spirit	"Christmas in Canada"	1991	Cassette single
PC-1	Psycho Circus	Psycho Circus	1992	
W3CD 13512	Rush	Box Set	1992	Box Set - Includes: Hemispheres; 2112; Signals
W3CD 13514	Max Webster	Box Set	1992	Box Set - Includes: High Class in Borrowed Shoes; A Million Vacations; Universal Juveniles
01143-1134-9	Rush	Snakes & Arrows Live	2008	Blu-ray
