= Diamonds Diamonds =

Diamonds, Diamonds

Greatest hits album by Max Webster
- Released: 7 August 1981
- Recorded: May 1975 – January 1979
- Genre: Rock
- Length: 47:24
- Label: Anthem
- Producer: Various

Max Webster chronology
Universal Juveniles (1980)	Diamonds, Diamonds (1981)	The Best of Max Webster (1989)

Professional ratings
Review scores
Source	Rating
AllMusic	4/5 stars
Collector's Guide to Heavy Metal	7/10

Diamonds, Diamonds is a compilation album by the Canadian rock band Max Webster. It was released in 1981 after the band had broken up, and features two new tracks: "Hot Spots" and "Overnight Sensation", which were recorded in 1975 during the debut album sessions. No songs from the band's fifth album, Universal Juveniles, are included on this album. An alternate version of "On the Road" from the High Class in Borrowed Shoes sessions was slated for release but pulled at the eleventh hour.

== Track listing ==
All tracks are written by Kim Mitchell and Pye Dubois, except where noted.

Side one
No.	Title	Original release	Length
1.	"Gravity"	High Class in Borrowed Shoes (1977)	4:52
2.	"High Class in Borrowed Shoes"	High Class in Borrowed Shoes	3:59
3.	"Diamonds, Diamonds"	High Class in Borrowed Shoes	3:19
4.	"Summer's Up"	Max Webster (1976)	2:36
5.	"Blowing the Blues Away" (Terry Watkinson)	Max Webster	3:15
6.	"Let Go the Line" (Watkinson)	A Million Vacations (1979)	3:34
7.	"A Million Vacations" (Gary McCracken, Dubois)	A Million Vacations	3:14

Side two
No.	Title	Original release	Length
1.	"The Party"	Mutiny Up My Sleeve (1978)	4:46
2.	"Hot Spots"	previously unreleased	2:41
3.	"Paradise Skies"	A Million Vacations	3:27
4.	"Overnight Sensation"	previously unreleased	2:55
5.	"Lip Service"	Mutiny Up My Sleeve	4:02
6.	"Hangover"	Max Webster	4:38

Notes

- Tracks 1–5, 13 produced by Max Webster and Terry Brown
- Tracks 8, 9, 11, 12 produced by Max Webster, Terry Brown, Mike Tilka
- Tracks 6, 7, 10 produced by Max Webster and John De Nottbeck

== Personnel ==
- Kim Mitchell – guitar and vocals
- Paul Kersey – drums and percussion (tracks 4, 5, 9, 11 13)
- Gary McCracken – drums (tracks 1–3, 6–8, 10, 12)
- Mike Tilka – bass guitar and vocals (tracks 1–5, 9, 11, 13)
- Dave Myles – bass guitar (tracks 6–8, 10, 12)
- Terry Watkinson – keyboards and vocals
- Pye Dubois – lyrics
