= Live Magnetic Air =

Live album by Max Webster
- Released: 22 October 1979
- Recorded: 13 September 1979 at Lyric Theatre, Kitchener; 14 September 1979 at War Memorial Hall, Guelph
- Genre: Rock
- Length: 45:20
- Label: Anthem (Canada); Capitol (US, Europe)
- Producer: Max Webster, Terry Brown, Tom Berry

Max Webster chronology
A Million Vacations (1979)	Live Magnetic Air (1979)	Universal Juveniles (1980)

Professional ratings
Review scores
Source	Rating
AllMusic	4/5 stars
Collector's Guide to Heavy Metal	8/10
Record Mirror	5/5 stars

Live Magnetic Air is a live album by Canadian rock band Max Webster. It was recorded on 13 September 1979 at the Lyric Theatre in Kitchener and 14 September 1979 at War Memorial Hall in Guelph, with two shows played at each venue each night. The album was released on 22 October 1979 in Canada by Anthem Records and in the USA by Capitol Records and has been certified gold by the Canadian Recording Industry Association.

The album was released in the United States on Capitol Records. In the United Kingdom a rare alternative to this release was made available. Seeing as Max Webster had two prior releases in the UK, Capitol-EMI released Magnetic Air, which allowed new fans to hear some of the live portions of the North American released Live Magnetic Air, as well as selections from the first two Max Webster releases Max Webster and High Class in Borrowed Shoes.

== Track listing ==
All tracks are written by Kim Mitchell, Pye Dubois, except where indicated.

Side one
No.	Title	Writer(s)	Original album	Length
1.	"America's Veins"		High Class in Borrowed Shoes	4:09
2.	"Paradise Skies"		A Million Vacations	3:35
3.	"In Context of the Moon"		High Class in Borrowed Shoes	5:21
4.	"Night Flights"	Terry Watkinson, Dubois	A Million Vacations	3:20
5.	"Lip Service"		Mutiny Up My Sleeve	4:15
6.	"Sarniatown Reggae"			1:15

All tracks are written by Kim Mitchell, Pye Dubois, except where indicated.

Side two
No.	Title	Writer(s)	Original album	Length
1.	"Here Among the Cats"		Max Webster	3:48
2.	"Gravity"		High Class in Borrowed Shoes	4:48
3.	"Waterline"		Mutiny Up My Sleeve	4:30
4.	"Charmonium"	Watkinson	A Million Vacations	4:38
5.	"Hangover"		Max Webster	5:41

== Personnel ==
Max Webster

- Kim Mitchell – guitars and vocals
- Terry Watkinson – keyboards and vocals, lead vocals on "Charmonium"
- Dave Myles – bass guitar
- Gary McCracken – drums and percussion
- Pye Dubois – lyrics

Production

- Terry Brown – producer, engineer, mixing
- Mike McCarthy, Roger Hrycyna – mixing assistant
- Hugh Syme – album design
- Tom Berry – executive producer
