= Roll the Bones Tour =

1991–1992 concert tour by Rush

- Tour by Rush
- Location: Europe; North America
- Associated album: Roll the Bones
- Start date: October 25, 1991
- End date: June 28, 1992
- Legs: 3
- No. of shows: 101

Rush concert chronology
- Presto Tour (1990); Roll the Bones Tour (1991–1992); Counterparts Tour (1994)

The Roll the Bones Tour was a concert tour by Canadian rock band Rush in support of their fourteenth studio album Roll the Bones.

== Background ==
The tour kicked off October 25, 1991 at Copps Coliseum in Hamilton, Ontario and culminated on June 28, 1992 at the World Music Theater in Tinley Park, Illinois, estimated to have performed to more than 960,000 fans. Guitarist Eric Johnson was the initial opening act in the autumn of 1991, following the band losing a Grammy nomination for "Where's My Thing?" to Johnson's "Cliffs of Dover". American rock band Primus were the opening act for Rush later on this tour when Johnson canceled his last two weeks on the first leg as an opening act, as well as Vinnie Moore and Mr. Big. Opening for the band's hometown show in Toronto, Ontario on December 16 was The Tragically Hip, which was set up as a benefit for United Way, alongside the Daily Bread Food Bank - in which the audience had donated fifty thousand pounds of food. The band included super-sized screens, laser lights and moving pictures throughout their performances.

In Sacramento on January 27, 1992, the band performed what they had considered their worst show, as they performed to an unruly audience who threw objects at the band throughout the performance. Prior to the show, Rush refused to perform "general admission" performances due to rowdiness, potential injury and death in the crowd, but was booked to perform the show and was unexpectedly general admission.

== Reception ==
The Pittsburgh Post-Gazette's John Hayes, reviewing the Pittsburgh performance on October 28, 1991, opined that Rush had found an effective formula that held the attention of rock fans after the release of twenty albums and a long history of successful concert tours, later stating that the shows are kept alive by the "sheer talent" of the band members. Notifying the Roll the Bones Tour as one of the biggest productions on the road, he acknowledged the stage's usage of lasers, lighting, special effects, a rotating drum platform during Peart's solo and inflatable rabbits throughout the show.

Reviewing the Burgettstown concert on June 21, 1992, Kurt Bruner of the Observer-Reporter opened that the trio pulled no punches and was a knockout, sending the audience who was predominantly late 20s to middle aged reeling. He expressed on the usage of special effects and lighting, praising its usage in highlighting the songs performed, as well as the choreographed lasers and lights during Peart's drum solo, which he also noted as "outstanding", "superb" and as one of the memorable aspects of the show. He acknowledged the band, stating that they looked to be enjoying themselves without exerting much effort - as well as praising the stage design as simple, with only a ramp featured around the band.

The Toledo Blade's Ralph Kisiel, reviewing the Toledo performance, stated that Rush still showed that they could do their performances with "intensity" and "imagination". Noting on the audience, Kisiel commented that the overwhelming responses and emotions of the audience were whipped up quickly when the band performed crowd favorites, and when the show was over, had left fans satisfied. Kisiel continued, saying the band "clearly illustatrated that they can rock and rattle your bones for more than two hours".

== Set list ==
This is an example set list adapted from Rush: Wandering the Face of the Earth – The Official Touring History of what were performed during the tour, but may not represent the majority of the shows. For the encore, the band performed a medley of older material, which would feature a minute of each song for the medley. This was also the first and only Rush tour to not feature "YYZ" in the setlist since the song's release.

1. "Force Ten"
2. "Limelight"
3. "Freewill"
4. "Distant Early Warning"
5. "Time Stand Still"
6. "Dreamline"
7. "Bravado"
8. "Roll the Bones"
9. "Show Don't Tell"
10. "The Big Money"
11. "Ghost of a Chance"
12. "Subdivisions"
13. "The Pass"
14. "The Trees"
15. "Where's My Thing?"
16. "The Rhythm Method" (drum solo)
17. "Closer to the Heart"
18. "Xanadu"
19. "Superconductor"
20. "Tom Sawyer"
  Encore
21. "The Spirit of Radio"
22. Medley: "2112" (Overture) / "Finding My Way" / "La Villa Strangiato" / "Anthem" / "Red Barchetta" / "The Spirit of Radio" (reprise)
23. "Cygnus X-1" (teaser)

== Tour dates ==
List of 1991 concerts
Date	City	Country	Venue	Attendance	Gross
October 25, 1991	Hamilton	Canada	Copps Coliseum	12,315 / 12,315	$301,718
October 26, 1991	Rochester	United States	Rochester Community War Memorial	8,404 / 8,404	$168,060
October 28, 1991	Pittsburgh	United States	Civic Arena	11,956 / 12,479	$239,597
October 29, 1991	Cincinnati	United States	Riverfront Coliseum	10,601 / 12,904	$206,720
October 31, 1991	Indianapolis	United States	Market Square Arena	9,243 / 12,000	$180,238
November 1, 1991	Rosemont	United States	Rosemont Horizon	14,815 / 14,815	$343,478
November 3, 1991	Minneapolis	United States	Target Center	10,435 / 12,500	$219,135
November 4, 1991	Omaha	United States	Omaha Civic Auditorium	5,995 / 6,700	$116,903
November 6, 1991	Topeka	United States	Landon Arena	6,436 / 7,000	$125,502
November 7, 1991	St. Louis	United States	St. Louis Arena	11,492 / 13,000	$224,094
November 9, 1991	Normal	United States	Redbird Arena	8,666 / 8,666	$168,987
November 10, 1991	Milwaukee	United States	Bradley Center	12,813 / 15,500	$247,248
November 13, 1991	Auburn Hills	United States	The Palace of Auburn Hills	22,454 / 26,000	$521,955
November 14, 1991	Auburn Hills	United States	The Palace of Auburn Hills	22,454 / 26,000	$521,955
November 16, 1991	Toledo	United States	John F. Savage Hall	5,647 / 7,000	$119,510
November 17, 1991	Richfield	United States	Richfield Coliseum	21,367 / 25,000	$430,443
November 18, 1991	Richfield	United States	Richfield Coliseum	21,367 / 25,000	$430,443
November 26, 1991	Ottawa	Canada	Ottawa Civic Centre	-	
November 28, 1991	Montreal	Canada	Montreal Forum	-	
November 29, 1991	Quebec City	Canada	Colisée de Québec	-	
December 1, 1991	Philadelphia	United States	Spectrum	24,397 / 28,058	$491,422
December 3, 1991	Philadelphia	United States	Spectrum	24,397 / 28,058	$491,422
December 4, 1991	Landover	United States	Capital Centre	14,070 / 15,565	$321,543
December 6, 1991	New York City	United States	Madison Square Garden	31,000 / 31,000	$776,190
December 7, 1991	New York City	United States	Madison Square Garden	31,000 / 31,000	$776,190
December 9, 1991	Providence	United States	Providence Civic Center	9,431 / 11,500	$183,904
December 10, 1991	Worcester	United States	Worcester Centrum	12,266 / 12,266	$249,347
December 12, 1991	Albany	United States	Knickerbocker Arena	10,614 / 13,690	$210,794
December 13, 1991	Hartford	United States	Hartford Civic Center	12,263 / 13,805	$256,934
December 15, 1991	Buffalo	United States	Buffalo Memorial Auditorium	12,703 / 14,605	$278,905
December 16, 1991	Toronto	Canada	Maple Leaf Gardens	11,906 / 11,906	$337,767

List of 1992 concerts
Date	City	Country	Venue	Attendance	Gross
January 18, 1992	Las Cruces	United States	Pan American Center	9,803 / 9,803	$196,060
January 20, 1992	San Diego	United States	San Diego Sports Arena	11,607 / 12,068	$241,317
January 22, 1992	Inglewood	United States	Great Western Forum	29,316 / 29,316	$653,664
January 23, 1992	Inglewood	United States	Great Western Forum	29,316 / 29,316	$653,664
January 25, 1992	Fresno	United States	Selland Arena	9,011 / 9,011	$156,640
January 27, 1992	Sacramento	United States	ARCO Arena	11,067 / 12,000	$250,710
January 29, 1992	Oakland	United States	Oakland Arena	25,254 / 25,254	$571,940
January 30, 1992	Oakland	United States	Oakland Arena	25,254 / 25,254	$571,940
February 2, 1992	Vancouver	Canada	Pacific Coliseum	-	
February 4, 1992	Seattle	United States	Seattle Center Coliseum	12,453 / 12,453	$274,610
February 5, 1992	Portland	United States	Memorial Coliseum	8,826 / 9,500	$203,429
February 15, 1992	San Antonio	United States	HemisFair Arena	11,491 / 14,518	$212,438
February 16, 1992	Dallas	United States	Reunion Arena	14,690 / 14,690	$317,466
February 18, 1992	Houston	United States	The Summit	11,784 / 13,608	$274,431
February 20, 1992	Austin	United States	Frank Erwin Center	9,222 / 12,589	$190,314
~~February 22, 1992~~	Shreveport	United States	Hirsch Memorial Coliseum	-	
February 23, 1992	New Orleans	United States	Lakefront Arena	7,495 / 7,495	$160,904
February 25, 1992	Pensacola	United States	Pensacola Civic Center	6,190 / 7,500	$129,990
February 26, 1992	Jacksonville	United States	Jacksonville Coliseum	5,166 / 6,000	$116,235
February 28, 1992	Miami	United States	Miami Arena	12,364 / 12,364	$295,428
February 29, 1992	St. Petersburg	United States	Florida Suncoast Dome	12,075 / 12,500	$271,688
March 2, 1992	Orlando	United States	Orlando Arena	10,859 / 10,859	$244,328
March 4, 1992	Atlanta	United States	Omni Coliseum	13,966 / 13,966	$309,569
March 5, 1992	Columbia	United States	Carolina Coliseum	5,616 / 8,712	$115,128
March 7, 1992	Chapel Hill	United States	Dean Smith Center	11,039 / 13,114	$226,300
March 10, 1992	Richmond	United States	Richmond Coliseum	7,653 / 9,880	$149,234
March 12, 1992	Binghamton	United States	Broome County Veterans Memorial Arena	5,627 / 5,800	$139,112
March 14, 1992	New Haven	United States	New Haven Coliseum	8,881 / 9,500	$197,850
March 15, 1992	Uniondale	United States	Nassau Veterans Memorial Coliseum	15,290 / 15,503	$347,855
April 10, 1992	Sheffield	England	Sheffield Arena	-	
April 12, 1992	Birmingham	England	National Exhibition Centre	-	
April 13, 1992	Birmingham	England	National Exhibition Centre	-	
April 15, 1992	Glasgow	Scotland	Scottish Exhibition and Conference Centre	-	
April 17, 1992	London	England	Wembley Arena	-	
April 18, 1992	London	England	Wembley Arena	-	
April 21, 1992	Hanover	Germany	Music Hall	-	
April 23, 1992	Cologne	Germany	Sporthalle	-	
April 24, 1992	Frankfurt	Germany	Festhalle Frankfurt	-	
April 27, 1992	Berlin	Germany	Eissporthalle an der Jafféstraße	-	
April 28, 1992	Nuremberg	Germany	Frankenhalle	-	
April 29, 1992	Stuttgart	Germany	Hanns-Martin-Schleyer-Halle	-	
May 1, 1992	Paris	France	Le Zénith	-	
May 3, 1992	Rotterdam	Netherlands	Rotterdam Ahoy	-	
May 21, 1992	Memphis	United States	Mid-South Coliseum	6,503 / 8,500	$120,306
May 23, 1992	Kansas City	United States	Kemper Arena	9,544 / 16,871	$194,682
May 24, 1992	Valley Center	United States	Kansas Coliseum	5,541 / 9,237	$110,820
May 25, 1992	Oklahoma City	United States	Myriad Convention Center	6,796 / 10,500	$140,843
May 27, 1992	Greenwood Village	United States	Fiddler's Green Amphitheatre	16,212 / 17,990	$277,806
May 29, 1992	Salt Lake City	United States	Delta Center	11,046 / 14,000	$221,998
May 31, 1992	Mountain View	United States	Shoreline Amphitheatre	15,691 / 20,000	$306,356
June 1, 1992	Reno	United States	Lawlor Events Center	4,236 / 8,500	$95,310
June 3, 1992	Irvine	United States	Irvine Meadows Amphitheatre	28,492 / 30,000	$724,294
June 4, 1992	Irvine	United States	Irvine Meadows Amphitheatre	28,492 / 30,000	$724,294
June 6, 1992	Las Vegas	United States	Thomas & Mack Center	8,993 / 10,500	$206,198
June 7, 1992	Phoenix	United States	Desert Sky Pavilion	14,523 / 19,945	$294,957
June 9, 1992	Albuquerque	United States	Tingley Coliseum	5,916 / 7,500	$115,974
June 10, 1992	Lubbock	United States	Lubbock Municipal Coliseum	7,199 / 7,199	$140,746
June 12, 1992	Maryland Heights	United States	Riverport Amphitheatre	13,955 / 19,861	$254,910
June 13, 1992	Nashville	United States	Starwood Amphitheatre	8,426 / 17,128	$122,247
June 14, 1992	Charlotte	United States	Blockbuster Pavilion	6,440 / 18,728	$129,839
June 16, 1992	Columbia	United States	Merriweather Post Pavilion	11,600 / 15,772	$239,770
June 17, 1992	Mansfield	United States	Great Woods PAC	14,978 / 14,978	$299,997
June 19, 1992	East Rutherford	United States	Brendan Byrne Arena	15,634 / 18,650	$335,081
June 20, 1992	Wantagh	United States	Jones Beach Amphitheater	10,700 / 10,700	$279,365
June 21, 1992	Burgettstown	United States	Star Lake Amphitheater	13,129 / 20,131	$184,752
June 23, 1992	Fairborn	United States	Nutter Center	9,026 / 9,324	$180,520
June 24, 1992	Noblesville	United States	Deer Creek Music Center	9,120 / 12,000	$168,230
June 26, 1992	Clarkston	United States	Pine Knob Music Theater	14,977 / 14,977	$325,965
June 27, 1992	East Troy	United States	Alpine Valley Music Theatre	21,474 / 35,000	$359,932
June 28, 1992	Tinley Park	United States	New World Music Theater	11,944 / 15,000	$288,410

=== Box office score data ===
List of box office score data with date, city, venue, attendance, gross, references
Date (1992)	City	Venue	Attendance	Gross	Ref(s)
June 3–4	Irvine, United States	Irvine Meadows Amphitheatre	28,492 / 30,000	$724,295	
June 6	Las Vegas, United States	Thomas & Mack Center	8,993 / 10,500	$206,198	
June 26	Clarkston, United States	Pine Knob Music Theatre	14,977 / 14,977	$325,965	
June 27	East Troy, United States	Alpine Valley Music Theatre	21,474 / 35,000	$359,932	

== Personnel ==
- Geddy Lee – vocals, bass, keyboards
- Alex Lifeson – guitar, backing vocals
- Neil Peart – drums
