= Ghost of a Chance (Rush song) =

Single by Rush

from the album Roll the Bones
- B-side: "Where's My Thing?" (US) "Dreamline" (UK)
- Released: April 6, 1992 (UK)
- Recorded: 1991
- Genre: Rock
- Length: 5:18
- Label: Anthem (Canada); Atlantic
- Composers: Geddy Lee; Alex Lifeson
- Lyricist: Neil Peart
- Producers: Rupert Hine, Rush

Rush singles chronology
"Roll the Bones" (1992)	"Ghost of a Chance" (1992)	"Stick It Out" (1993)

"Ghost of a Chance" is a song by the Canadian rock band Rush released as the third single from their 1991 album Roll the Bones. The single peaked at No. 2 on the U.S. Album Rocks Track chart. The lyrics focus on finding love, and as its strength over any other force.

Although the song was a radio hit at the time of its release, it has rarely been performed live. It was played live in 1991-1992 during the Roll the Bones Tour, and not played again until the 2008 leg of the Snakes & Arrows Tour.

== Track listing ==
Music by Geddy Lee and Alex Lifeson; lyrics by Neil Peart.

US release:

1. Ghost of a Chance – 5:19
2. Where's My Thing? - 3:49
3. An Interview With Rush

UK / German release:

1. Ghost of a Chance – 5:19
2. Dreamline – 4:38
3. Chain Lightning – 4:33 [only on CD]
4. Red Tide – 4:29 [only on CD]

== Personnel ==
- Geddy Lee – vocals, bass
- Alex Lifeson – guitar
- Neil Peart – drums
