= Universal Juveniles =

Studio album by Max Webster
- Released: 3 October 1980
- Recorded: June – August 1980
- Studio: Phase One Studios, Toronto, Ontario, Canada
- Genre: Hard rock
- Length: 41:19
- Label: Anthem (Canada); Mercury (US, Europe)
- Producer: Jack Richardson

Max Webster chronology
Live Magnetic Air (1979)	Universal Juveniles (1980)	Diamonds Diamonds (1981)

Singles from Universal Juveniles
- 1. "Blue River Liquor Shine" / "Check" Released: 1980; 2. "Battle Scar" / "April in Toledo" Released: 1980 (UK only)

Professional ratings
Review scores
Source	Rating
AllMusic	3/5 stars
Collector's Guide to Heavy Metal	10/10

Universal Juveniles is the fifth and final studio album by Canadian rock band Max Webster, released in 1980 in Canada by Anthem Records. It was released internationally on the Mercury Records label outside of Canada. The album was produced by Jack Richardson who was best known for producing the Guess Who's biggest hit records. It features a guest appearance by friends and fellow Canadian rockers Rush on the song "Battle Scar", recorded live in studio on July 28, 1980. It is also the only Max Webster album to not feature Terry Watkinson as a member, though he makes a guest appearance on "Battle Scar".

The album was certified Gold by the Canadian Recording Industry Association.

== Track listing ==
All songs written by Kim Mitchell and Pye Dubois, except where indicated

Side one

1. "In the World of Giants"– 4:18
2. "Check" – 2:37
3. "April in Toledo" – 3:40
4. "Juveniles Don't Stop" – 3:32
5. "Battle Scar" (feat. Rush) – 5:48

Side two

1. "Chalkers" (Dave Myles, Dubois) – 3:45
2. "Drive and Desire" – 3:53
3. "Blue River Liquor Shine" – 4:15
4. "What Do You Do with the Urge" (Gary McCracken, Dubois) – 3:20
5. "Cry Out for Your Life" – 5:33

== Personnel ==
Max Webster

- Kim Mitchell – guitar and vocals
- Dave Myles – bass
- Gary McCracken – drums
- Pye Dubois – lyrics

Additional musicians

- Doug Riley – piano (tracks 1, 3, 8, 9), clavinet (tracks 3, 10), synthesizer (track 9)
- David Stone – synthesizer (tracks 1, 4, 6, 7, 8)
- Terry Watkinson – keyboards (track 5)
- Geddy Lee – bass and vocals (track 5)
- Alex Lifeson – guitar (track 5)
- Neil Peart – drums (track 5)

Production

- Jack Richardson – producer, mixing at Soundstage, Toronto, Canada
- David Greene – engineer
- Lenny DeRose – associate engineer
- Ringo Hrycyna – associate mixing engineer
- Bob Ludwig – mastering at Masterdisk, New York

== Other links ==
- https://web.archive.org/web/20061117022944/http://www.maxwebster.ca/
