= Friction (Coney Hatch album) =

Studio album by Coney Hatch
- Released: 1985
- Genre: Rock
- Label: Anthem
- Producer: Max Norman

Coney Hatch chronology
Outa Hand (1983)	Friction (1985)	Best of Three (1992)

Friction, the third album by Coney Hatch, was released in 1985. Drummer Dave Ketchum left prior to this release, to be replaced by Barry Connors, formerly of Toronto.

Professional ratings
Review scores
Source	Rating
AllMusic	link

== Track listing ==
1. This Ain't Love 4:07
2. She's Gone 3:58
3. Wrong Side Of Town 3:20
4. Girl From Last Night's Dream 4:04
5. Coming To Get You 3:48
6. Fantasy 4:17
7. He's A Champion 4:40
8. State Line 4:03
9. Burning Love 3:59
10. Fuel For The Fire 4:07
  - "Fuel For the Fire" is a B-side to a British single.

== Personnel ==
- Carl Dixon – rhythm guitar, lead vocals
- Andy Curran – bass guitar, lead vocals on "Wrong Side of Town"
- Steve Shelski – lead guitar, vocals
- Barry Connors – drums, percussion
- Max Norman – producer, engineer
- Michael Kaye – guitar, bass technician
- Domenic Amatucci – lighting director
- Bobby Wyatt - drum technician
- Ross Tuskey - sound engineer
- Russ Ryan - guitar technician
