= Heresy (Rush song) =

Song by Rush

from the album Roll the Bones
- Released: September 1991
- Recorded: February – May 1991, Le Studio Quebec & McClear Place Toronto
- Genre: Rock
- Length: 5:26
- Label: Anthem Canada, Atlantic
- Composer: Geddy Lee & Alex Lifeson
- Lyricist: Neil Peart
- Producers: Rupert Hine, Rush

"Heresy" is a song written by and performed by Rush and appears on their 1991 album Roll the Bones. The song is about the fall of communism in Eastern Europe and Russia, resultant about-face consumerism and the passing of the Cold War nuclear threat.

== Song ==
Like the rest of the album Roll the Bones, "Heresy" also marks the transition from the band's 1980s style to their sound of the 1990s where guitars are a prominent part of this song and keyboard and organ are played in the background. As with the vast majority of Rush songs since the album Fly by Night, Geddy Lee and Alex Lifeson composed the song's music while Neil Peart wrote the lyrics.

The percussion aspect of this song was noted in the Roll the Bones Tour program. Neil Peart explains,

The drum part in this song was inspired by a different part of the world. One hot night I lay under the stars on a rooftop in Togo and heard the sound of drums from across the valley. Even on the edge of sleep the drumming moved me, the rhythm stayed in my head, and while working on this song I used variations of it and other West African influences."

== Lyrics ==
The song speaks of the wall coming down, and the liberation of Eastern Europe from Communism which started in 1989 and continued through the early 1990s. While historians and journalists alike celebrated these events, Neil Peart took a different view of these monumental changes in Europe. In the Roll the Bones tour program, he asserted,

The deconstruction of the Eastern Bloc made some people happy. It made me mad. For generations, those people had to line up for toilet paper, wear bad suits, drive nasty cars and drink bug spray to get high...and it was all a mistake? A heavy price to pay for somebody else's misguided ideology, it seems to me, and that waste of life must be the ultimate heresy.

The song speaks of capitalism with people who were now suddenly free buying up everything they've ever wanted to. The song concludes with the fact that all other countries that were not under the communist yoke were threatened by the possibility of nuclear war. Referring to the Cold War, the military spending, and building of nuclear bombs for that war, the song's main line was, "All those precious wasted years. Who will pay?"

== See also ==
- List of Rush songs
- Wind of Change (Scorpions song)

== Notes ==
Rush drummer Neil Peart discussed the topic of the end of the Cold War further in his fourth book, Roadshow: Landscape with Drums.
