= BB Gabor (album) =

Album by BB Gabor

Studio album by B. B. Gabor
- Released: 1980
- Recorded: June 1979
- Studio: 5 studios in Toronto
- Genre: New wave
- Length: 37:00
- Label: Anthem
- Producer: Terry Brown

B. B. Gabor chronology
BB Gabor (1980)	'Girls of the Future' (1981)

BB Gabor is a 1980 album by the Hungarian Canadian artist B. B. Gabor. It featured two Canadian hit singles: "Nyet Nyet Soviet (Soviet Jewellery)" and "Metropolitan Life." The album focused on themes such as city life, Soviet oppression, love, and consumerism.

In 2007, 17 years after Gabor's death, the Canadian label Pacemaker Entertainment combined his two albums, BB Gabor and Girls of the Future, onto a single CD.

== Track listing ==
Order	Title	Length	Writer(s)	Ref
1	"Metropolitan Life"	2:41	Gabor, Stevenson	
2	"Consumer"	2:48	Gabor, Stevenson	
3	"Nyet Nyet Soviet (Soviet Jewellery)"	2:38	Gabor, Armstrong	
4	"Laser Love"	4:10	Gabor, Stevenson	
5	"Moscow Drug Club"	4:25	Gabor, Stevenson, Keldie	
6	"Underground World"	3:09	Gabor	
7	"All the Time"	5:06	Gabor, Scott	
8	"Hunger, Poverty & Misery"	3:46	Gabor	
9	"Ooh Mama"	2:16	Gabor	
10	"Big Yellow Taxi"	5:43	Joni Mitchell (cover)	

== Personnel ==
- B. B. Gabor: Guitars, vocals
- David Bendeth: Guitars
- David Stone: Synthesizers, synthesized bass, clavinet
- Jim Jones: Acoustic & electric bass
- Mike Sloski: Drums
- Paul Armstrong: Drums, percussion
- Peter Follett: Guitar
- Polly T. & The Buros: Vocal backing
- Rob Gusevs: Piano, organ
- Simon Stone: Flute
- Terry Brown: Tambourine
- Tom Griffiths: Bass
- Denis Keldi: Writer
- Leon Stevenson: Writer
- "Cosmic" Ray Scott: Writer
