= Brad Woodgate =

Brad Woodgate is a Canadian businessperson, writer, and musician.

== Life and career ==
Woodgate played competitive basketball and went on to play one year at Toronto Metropolitan University (formerly Ryerson). His grandfather was an ice hockey player who played for Boston Bruins.

In 2000, Woodgate had launched Wellnx Life Science with his brother, Derek Woodgate, which led to Wellnx and Slimquick.

In 2012, Woodgate started a reality show called The Entrepreneur in Me.

In 2018, Woodgate founded The No Sugar Company to help reduce consumption of refined sugar.

In May 2021, Woodgate published his first book No Sugar in Me.

In October 2021 Woodgate launched a no sugar natural energy drink, Joyburst.

In February 2022, Joyburst released their first Super Bowl commercial during Super Bowl LVI.

In June 2022, Woodgate collaborated with rapper Vanilla Ice and introduced a new natural flavor called Joyburst Vanilla Ice. Later, Woodgate and Vanilla Ice released a song entitled "Joyburst".

In September 2022, Woodgate signed a music contract with a record label, Anthem Entertainment. In the same month, he started No Sugar Day, to be celebrated on October 3 every year. It is recognized by the National Day Archives and was supported by Kelly Osbourne. A month later, Woodgate released his first solo single, "It's a No for Me". This song was released in coordination with the first No Sugar Day he started.

In October 2022, Woodgate appeared on Entertainment Tonight with Kelly Osbourne to discuss her challenges with sugar consumption in conjunction with the No Sugar Day.

== Discography ==
- "Joyburst" (2022) by Vanilla Ice and Brad Woodgate
- "It's a No For Me" (2022)
