= Outa Hand =

Studio album by Coney Hatch
- Released: 1983
- Studio: United Media
- Genre: Rock, hard rock
- Label: Anthem
- Producer: Max Norman

Coney Hatch chronology
Coney Hatch (1982)	Outa Hand (1983)	Friction (1985)

Professional ratings
Review scores
Source	Rating
AllMusic	2/5 stars

Outa Hand is an album by Canadian band Coney Hatch. It was released in 1983. A remastered version with bonus tracks was released on CD by Rock Candy Records in 2006.

== Track listing ==
1. "Don't Say Make Me" 4:16
2. "Shake It" 3:32
3. "First Time for Everything" 3:48
4. "Some Like It Hot" 2:56
5. "To Feel the Feeling Again" 4:13
6. "Too Far Gone" 3:57
7. "Love Games" 3:33
8. "Fallen Angel" 3:27
9. "Music of the Night" 5:41
- The 2006 remaster added three bonus tracks:
1. "Nobody Gives You" 3:01
2. "Your Kinda Love" 3:29
3. "Fly On" (demo) 4:18

== Personnel ==
Coney Hatch

- Carl Dixon – rhythm guitar, lead vocals
- Andy Curran – bass guitar, lead vocals on tracks 2, 4, 7, 8 and 11 (bonus on 2006 remaster)
- Steve Shelski – lead guitar, vocals
- Dave "Thumper" Ketchum – drums, percussion

Additional personnel

- Peter Fredette: lead guitar and backing vocals on tracks 3 and 9
