= Dave Ketchum =

Dave Ketchum may refer to:

- Dave "Thumper" Ketchum, drummer for Coney Hatch
- David Ketchum (actor) (born 1928), in Get Smart and Camp Runamuck
