= Terry Brown (music producer) =

- Born: Terence David Brown
- Genres: Rock; heavy metal; alternative rock; blues; progressive rock
- Occupations: Producer, mixing engineer
- Years active: 1967–present
- Website: terrybrown.net

Terry Brown is a British record producer. He has been noted for his collaboration with the Canadian rock band Rush, for whom he produced every album from Fly by Night (1975) to Signals (1982). He also worked with the English pop rock band Cutting Crew and the Canadian progressive rock band Klaatu.

== Career ==
Brown began his career at Olympic Studios in the mid-1960s, working as one of Keith Grant's tape ops. His first engineering credit was on the Who's single "Substitute". He next worked at Lansdowne Studios, where he worked with Adrian Kerridge. At Lansdowne, Brown engineered such songs as Donovan's "Mellow Yellow" and Procol Harum's "Homburg". In 1967, while overseeing the construction of Morgan Studios, Brown again worked at Olympic. Doug Riley came to the studio to record a commercial for Labatt 50, and the two hit it off. Brown later went to Canada to help re-record the commercial, and he and Riley decided to open a recording studio, co-founding Toronto Sound Studios in 1969.

Bruce Wheaton of the group Everyday People wrote the song "You Make Me Wonder" which was recorded as a demo with his band. They took the demo to Toronto Sound Studios owners Brown and Doug Riley. They liked the song and signed the band up straight away. They produced the song plus "Nova Scotia Home Blues" which Wheaton had co-written with Pamela Marsh. The songs were released on single, GRT 1233-01 in November 1970. "You Make Me Wonder" made the RPM 100 chart, peaking at No. 60 for the week of 9 January 1971, and the B side, "Nova Scotia Home Blues" peaked at No. 20 on the RPM MOR Playlist chart for the week of 19 December, holding its position until 9 January 1971.

In 1973, Rush used Toronto Sound Studios to record portions of their first album Rush, with Brown recording "Finding My Way" and mixing the album. The band continued to work with Brown at Toronto Sound for its next three albums: Fly by Night (1975), Caress of Steel (1975), and 2112 (1976). Other albums recorded at the studio included April Wine's Electric Jewels (1973).

Faced with rising competition, Toronto Sound Studios closed in 1978. Brown helped produce the subsequent Rush albums from Hemispheres (1978) to Signals (1982).

Rush refers to Brown as "Broon" in the liner notes for their albums, and the nickname appears in the title of the instrumental piece "Broon's Bane" from their live album Exit...Stage Left. On this same record, Geddy Lee jokingly introduces the song "Jacob's Ladder" as having been written by "T. C. Broonsie", another reference to Brown and a pun on the name of Big Bill Broonzy.

In the 1990s while working at Metalworks Studios in Toronto, Brown recorded Fates Warning's Parallels and Voivod's Angel Rat, and again worked with Fates Warning on A Pleasant Shade of Gray. He also produced vocals on the Dream Theater album Metropolis Pt. 2: Scenes from a Memory, and appears as the uncredited voice of the hypnotherapist on that album.

Brown has also engineered, produced or mixed for many other artists, including Silent Running, Sonny and Cher, Kenny Rogers, Traffic, Joe Cocker, the Who, Procol Harum, the Troggs, Manfred Mann, Marianne Faithfull, Spencer Davis Group, Donovan, Barbra Streisand, Blue Rodeo, Max Webster, Klaatu, Thundermug, Lizzy Borden, Ray Stevens, the Bonzo Dog Band, Motherlode, Dr. Music, April Wine, the Stampeders, Michel Pagliaro, Moe Koffman, Alannah Myles, B.B. Gabor, Cirque du Soleil, Dream Theater, Lawrence Gowan, Rough Trade, the Killjoys, FM, Toronto, Ian Thomas, Moist, Christmas and Tiles.

== Albums Brown has been involved with ==
Year	Artist	Role	Album
1966	The Who	Engineer	"Substitute"
1967	Jimi Hendrix Experience	Engineer	Axis: Bold as Love
1968	the Bonzo Dog Band	Engineer	The Doughnut in Granny's Greenhouse
1971	Stampeders	Engineer	Against the Grain
1971	Moe Koffman	Engineer	Moe Koffman Plays Bach
1971	Everyday People	Producer	Everyday People
1972	Moe Koffman	Engineer	The Four Seasons
1973	April Wine	Engineer	Electric Jewels
1973	Moe Koffman	Engineer	Master Session
1974	Moe Koffman	Engineer	Solar Explorations
1975	Moe Koffman	Engineer	Live at George's
1975	Rush	Producer	Fly by Night
1975	Rush	Producer	Caress of Steel
1976	Rush	Producer	2112
1976	Klaatu	Producer	3:47 EST
1976	Max Webster	Producer	Max Webster
1976	Moe Koffman	Engineer	Jungle Man
1977	Max Webster	Producer	High Class in Borrowed Shoes
1977	Klaatu	Producer	Hope
1977	Rush	Producer	A Farewell to Kings
1978	Rush	Producer	Hemispheres
1978	Klaatu	Producer	Sir Army Suit
1978	Max Webster	Producer	Mutiny Up My Sleeve
1979	Max Webster	Producer	Live Magnetic Air
1980	B.B. Gabor	Producer	BB Gabor
1980	Rush	Producer	Permanent Waves
1981	Rush	Producer	Moving Pictures
1981	Rush	Producer	Exit...Stage Left
1981	Max Webster	Producer	Diamonds Diamonds
1982	Rush	Producer	Signals
1982	Lawrence Gowan	Producer	Gowan
1986	Cutting Crew	Producer	Broadcast
1987	Blue Rodeo	Producer	Outskirts
1987	Silent Running	Producer	Walk on Fire
1989	IQ	Producer	Are You Sitting Comfortably?
1989	Lizzy Borden	Producer	Master Of Disguise
1989	Fifth Angel	Producer	Time Will Tell
1990	Watertown	Producer	No Singing at the Dinner Table
1991	Fates Warning	Producer	Parallels
1991	Voivod	Producer	Angel Rat
1991	The Kite	Producer	The Kite
1994	Moist	Mixing	Silver
1997	Fates Warning	Producer	A Pleasant Shade of Gray
1999	Dream Theater	Spoken Voice (uncredited)	Metropolis Pt. 2: Scenes from a Memory
2000	Fates Warning	Producer	Disconnected
2004	Tiles	Producer	Window Dressing
2005	Cutting Crew	Producer	Grinning Souls
2007	Puppet Show	Producer	Tale of Woe
2007	Run With the Kittens	Producer	Condos and lofts
2007	Run With the Kittens	Producer	Bangers and Mash
2008	Tiles	Producer	Fly Paper (2008)
2012	Tiles	Mixing	Off the Floor 01
2013	Crash Karma	Producer Engineer	Rock Musique Deluxe
2014	Blurred Vision	Producer	"Organized Insanity"
2014	Tiles	Mixing	Off the Floor 02
2016	Tiles	Producer	Pretending 2 Run
2021	Discipline	Producer	Unfolded Like Staircase
2026	Brass Camel	Mixing	Ice Cold (Single)
