= Coney Hatch (album) =

Studio album by Coney Hatch
- Released: 21 May 1982
- Genre: Rock
- Label: Anthem Records
- Producer: Kim Mitchell

Coney Hatch chronology
Coney Hatch (1982)	Outa Hand (1983)

Professional ratings
Review scores
Source	Rating
AllMusic	link

Coney Hatch is the self-titled debut album by Coney Hatch, released in 1982. A video for the song "Devil's Deck" was produced. The album was re-issued by British label Rock Candy Records in 2005, including 3 bonus tracks and liner notes by former Kerrang! writer Howard Johnson.

Aldo Nova covered the song "Hey Operator" on his 1983 solo album Subject.

A cover of "Monkey Bars" was recorded by American hard rock band Buster Brown and released on their 1985 album Sign of Victory. The album was released by Mercury PolyGram Records globally with the exception of Japan it was released by Casablanca Records

The album was certified gold by Music Canada in 1987.

== Track listing ==
1. "Devil's Deck" (Carl Dixon/Andy Curran/Steve Shelski) - 4:26
2. "You Ain't Got Me" (Carl Dixon) - 3:36
3. "Stand Up" (Carl Dixon/Andy Curran/Steve Shelski/Dave Ketchum) * - 3:32
4. "No Sleep Tonight" (Carl Dixon/Andy Curran/Steve Shelski) - 3:22
5. "Love Poison" (Carl Dixon/Andy Curran/Steve Shelski) * - 3:44
6. "We Got the Night" (Carl Dixon/Andy Curran/Steve Shelski/Dave Ketchum) - 3:08
7. "Hey Operator" (Carl Dixon) - 3:17
8. "I'll Do the Talkin'" (Andy Curran/Steve Shelski) * - 3:07
9. "Victim of Rock" (Carl Dixon) - 3:11
10. "Monkey Bars" (Andy Curran/Steve Shelski) * - 4:21
11. "Dreamland" (Carl Dixon) - 3:43 [bonus track on 2005 remastered CD]
12. "Where I Draw the Line" (Carl Dixon/Andy Curran/Steve Shelski) - 3:54 [Bonus track on 2005 remastered CD - Previously unreleased]
13. "Sin After Sin"(Andy Curran/ Steve Shelski) - 4:00 (demo) [Bonus track on 2005 remastered CD] *

== Credits ==
- Carl Dixon – rhythm guitar, lead vocals
- Andy Curran – bass guitar, vocals; lead vocals on "Stand Up", "Love Poison", "I'll Do The Talkin'" and "Monkey Bars"
- Steve Shelski – lead guitar, vocals
- Dave "Thumper" Ketchum – drums, percussion
- Produced by Kim Mitchell
- Executive Producers Michael Tilka and Tom Berry
- Recorded at Quest Recording Studios, Oshawa, Ontario
- Engineered by Paul LaChapelle
- "You Ain't Got Me" recorded at Sound Kitchen Toronto, Ontario
- Co-Produced by Jack Richardson
- Mixed by Kim Mitchell and Paul LaChapelle at Quest Recording Studio
- Photography by David Street
- Released internationally through Mercury-PolyGram Records and Casablanca Records (Japan)
