= A Million Vacations =

Studio album by Max Webster
- Released: 5 March 1979
- Recorded: December 1978 – January 1979
- Studios: Phase One Studios, Toronto, Ontario, Canada
- Genres: Rock, progressive rock
- Length: 39:10
- Labels: Anthem (Canada); Capitol (US, Europe)
- Producers: John de Nottbeck, Max Webster

Max Webster chronology
Mutiny Up My Sleeve (1978)	A Million Vacations (1979)	Live Magnetic Air (1979)

Singles from A Million Vacations
- 1. "Let Go the Line" / "Moon Voices" Released: 1979; 2. "A Million Vacations" / "Night Flights" Released: 1979; 3. "Paradise Skies" / "In Context of the Moon" Released: 1979

A Million Vacations is the fourth album by Canadian rock band Max Webster. The record was released in 1979 in Canada by Anthem Records and in the United States and Europe by Capitol Records. The hit songs "A Million Vacations", "Let Go the Line", and "Paradise Skies" remain as Canadian Classic rock radio station staples. The lead track "Paradise Skies" was released by Capitol-EMI Records Britain as a picture disc single that featured "The Party" from their previous album Mutiny Up My Sleeve.

The album was certified platinum by the Canadian Recording Industry Association.

== Critical reception ==
Professional ratings
Review scores
Source	Rating
AllMusic	4/5 stars
Collector's Guide to Heavy Metal	10/10

The Globe and Mail wrote that "it's satisfying when they're right on, but even more annoying when they fiddle about on the fringes, wasting time on the sort of progressive rock material that is still oozing from the older British musicians on a daily basis."

== Track listing ==
Side one

1. "Paradise Skies" (Kim Mitchell, Pye Dubois) – 3:15
2. "Charmonium" (Terry Watkinson) – 4:15
3. "Night Flights" (Watkinson, Dubois) – 3:02
4. "Sun Voices" (Mitchell, Dubois) – 4:50
5. "Moon Voices" (Mitchell) – 3:05

Side two

1. "A Million Vacations" (Gary McCracken, Dubois) – 3:10
2. "Look Out" (Mitchell, Dubois) – 4:53
3. "Let Go the Line" (Watkinson) – 3:25
4. "Rascal Houdi" (Mitchell, Dubois) – 3:28
5. "Research (At Beach Resorts)" (Mitchell, Dubois) – 4:45

== Personnel ==
Max Webster

- Kim Mitchell – guitars and vocals
- Terry Watkinson – keyboards and vocals, lead vocals on "Charmonium" and "Let Go the Line"
- Dave Myles – bass guitar
- Gary McCracken – drums and percussion, lead vocals on "A Million Vacations"
- Pye Dubois – lyrics

Additional musicians

- Carla Jensen, Judy Donnelly – additional vocals
- Dick Smith – congas, shaker
- Bill Misener – string arrangements

Production

- John de Nottbeck – producer
- Mark Wright – engineer
- David Greene – mixing at Soundstage, Toronto
- Bob Ludwig – mastering at Masterdisk, New York

== Charts ==
Chart (1979)	Peak position
Canadian Albums (RPM)	13
