= Wrabit (album) =

Studio album by Wrabit
- Released: 1981
- Studios: Phase One Studios, Scarborough, Ontario, Canada
- Genre: Rock
- Label: MCA MCF 3126, MCA 5268
- Producer: Paul Gross

Wrabit chronology
Wrabit (1981)	Tracks (1982)

Wrabit aka Wrough & Wready is a 1981 album by Canadian rock band Wrabit. It contains the singles, "Back Home" and "Anyway, Anytime". The album registered on various charts in the following year.

== Background ==
The album was recorded at Phase One Studios in Scarborough, Ontario. The producer was Paul Gross and the engineer was Nick Walsh. It was reported in the 31 October issue of RPM Weekly that MCA Records were launching a major campaign for the self-titled album by Wrabit, which was set for a world-wide release. Mike McKelvie, MCA's director for marketing reported that they had a guaranteed sale for their accounts on the album. Participating retailers were set up with promotional items for the display contests.

The single from the group's album was "Back Home". The album was also issued as Wrough & Wready on MCA MCA-5268.

== Reception ==
As shown in the 15 January issue of the FMQB Album Report, the album had positive reactions from Rob Roman of KLAO, Bob Linder of WHDA, Duke Meyer of WOMF, Bill Stambaugh of KWXL, Ron Nenni of WPYX, Susan Christol of KTYD, and Tom Kelly of WZZO. It was their No. 2 most added record. The key tracks were "Anyway Anytime" and "Can't Be Wrong". Also in the same issue, it was reported that Wrabit had just come off of a Canadian tour with the group Triumph. They discovered that an increasing amount of major album playing rock stations were programming in tracks from the album which were, "Anyway, Anytime", "Pushing On", "Can't Be Wrong", and "Too Many Years". The powerful vocals and stinging guitars were mentioned as well as the album having about ten highly programmable tracks.

The album had a positive review in the 16 January issue of Record World, where it was one of the magazine's Album Picks. The reviewer noted the powerful vocal harmonies, stinging guitar and solid rhythm section and the album having all of the elements for AOR airplay.

The album had a very good review in the April 1982 issue of Canadian Musician. Reviewer Terry Burman wrote that with the first listen, the group could be mistaken for Toto, Foreigner or Styx. He also wrote that the weak points in the album with the strained vocals were, "Anyway, Anytime" and "Pushin' On". The best songs included, "Here I’ll Stay", "Just Go Away", "How Does She Do It" and "Too Many Years". The ballad, "Back Home" was also said to be good.

== Airplay ==
For the week of 19 February, in its fifth week, the album was at No. 24 on the FMQB Album Report Airplay Index chart with "Anytime" at 81%, "Pushin'" at 15% and "Wrong" at 4%. For the week of 26 February, the album was at No. 25 with "Anytime" at 82%, "Pushin'" at 13% and "Wrong" at 4%. The following week, it was back to 24. For the week of 12 March, it had dropped down to No. 28 with "Anytime" at 81%, "Pushin'" at 10% and "Wrong" at 5%.

== Charts ==
For the week of 16 January 1982, the group's album debuted at No. 7 on the Billboard Rock Albums Top Adds chart. The next week it was at No. 5 on the Top Adds chart, It had also made its debut at No. 44 on the Rock Albums chart. For the week of 30 January, the album peaked at No. 3 on the Top Adds chart and held the position for an additional week. For the week of 13 March, the album peaked at No. 24 on the Rock Albums chart and held that position for an additional week.

For the week of 30 January, the album debuted at No. 184 on the Record World Albums 101-200 chart. The album peaked at No. 133 on the Record World Albums 101-200 chart for the week of 20 March. It was still in the chart at No. 183 for the week of 10 April.

For the month of March 1982, the album was debuted at No. 7 in the Record Contenders Top Debut Albums chart. The following month, the magazine had discontinued the Contenders chart.

== Singles and tracks ==
=== "Anyway, Anytime" ===
For the week of 13 February, "Anyway, Anytime" debuted at No. 36 on the Billboard Rock Albums Top Tracks chart. It peaked at No. 17 on the chart for the week of 20 March. It also peaked at No. 19 on the FMQB Album Report Song Index chart for the week of 5 March.

=== "Pushin' On" ===
For the week of 19 February, "Pushin' On debuted at No. 99 in the FMQB Album Report Song Index chart.
