= Aerial (Canadian band) =

Canadian pop and rock band

- Origin: Toronto, Ontario, Canada
- Genres: Pop, rock
- Years active: 1973–1981
- Label: Anthem
- Past members: Brian Meissner, Laurie Currie

Aerial was a Canadian pop and rock band from Toronto, active from 1973 to 1981.

== History ==
Saskatchewan natives Brian Meissner and Laurie Currie originally found notoriety in the Winnipeg showband Sugar & Spice. By 1972, the band had changed its name to Spice and relocated to Toronto. When Spice broke up, Meissner and Currie launched a Beatles tribute act called Liverpool, with Miessner on bass and lead vocals, Currie on vocals and drums, David Moyles on guitar, and Rick Pearson on vocals and guitar. This original lineup played the first-ever Beatles Festival, The Fest for Beatles Fans, in New York City in 1974 and, that same year, played the famed Whisky a Go Go in Los Angeles. In 1976, Liverpool had two Canadian hits: "Down To Liverpool" charted at #69, "Dolly" (written by Miessner and produced by Ian Thomas) charted at #24.

Liverpool toured in Canada and the U.S. as a four-piece band until 1975, when Malcolm Buchanan was added to play keyboards, allowing the group to play songs from Sgt. Pepper's Lonely Hearts Club Band and Magical Mystery Tour. Further personnel changes occurred in 1976, when Gary O'Conner was added on guitar and vocals. It was at this time that Moyles and Pearson left the group; in 1977, the band changed their name to Aerial.

For their first album release, In The Middle Of The Night, Aerial was signed to Capitol Records in the U.S., and Toronto's Anthem Records. Their second release on Anthem, 1980's Maneuvers, saw Gary O'Conner replaced on guitar with Tim White on guitar and vocals.

The band had a Top 40 hit in Canada with the single "Easy Love". The song reached #92 on the national RPM Magazine charts in 1978.

In 1980, Aerial toured in support of Maneuvers and disbanded in 1981.

== Discography ==
=== Albums ===
- In the Middle of the Night (1978)
- Maneuvers (1980)

=== Singles ===
- "Down To Liverpool" (1976)
- "Dolly" (1976)
- "Easy Love" (1978)
- "Harmony" (1978)
- "Moments Like This" (1979)
- "Tears That You Cry" (1980)
