= Wrabit =

- Genres: AOR rock
- Years active: 1977 - 1980s
- Labels: MCA, Collector's Choice Music
- Spinoff of: Telleman
- Past members: Lou Nadeau; Les Paulhus; David Alpin; John Albani; Scott Jefferson Steck; Gary Craigh; Chris Brockway

Wrabit was a rock band from Ottawa, Canada that was around from the 1970s to the early 1980s. They had a number of charting albums and FM-radio hits during the existence.

== Background ==
Originating in Ottawa, the group evolved out of a club-cicuit band called Telleman. The members for Wrabit were, Lou Nadeau on lead vocals, Les Paulhus on keyboards, David Alpin on guitar, John Albani on guitar, Scott Jefferson Steck on drums, Gary Craigh on drums, Chris Brockway on bass. In 1979, they signed with MCA Records.

The group debuted with the Wrough & Wready album. During their time they opened for such acts as Black Sabbath and Gary US Bonds.

Their music had been described as having a similarity to Eric Burdon and Kim Carnes.

== Career ==
=== Wrabit aka Wrough & Wready ===
It was reported in the 31 October issue of RPM Weekly that MCA Records were launching a major campaign for the self-titled album by Wrabit. The album was set for a world-wide release. MCA director for marketing, Mike McKelvie reported that they had a guaranteed sale for their accounts on the album. Display contests with promotional items had been set up with participating retailers. The single from the group's album was "Back Home". The album was also issued as Wrough & Wready.

As shown in the 15 January issue of the FMQB Album Report, the album had positive reactions from Rob Roman of KLAO, Bob Linder of WHDA, Duke Meyer of WOMF, Bill Stambaugh of KWXL, Ron Nenni of WPYX, Susan Christol of KTYD, and Tom Kelly of WZZO. It was their No. 2 most added record. The key tracks were "Anyway Anytime" and "Can't Be Wrong".

For the week of 16 January 1982, the group's album debuted at No. 7 on the Billboard Rock Albums Top Adds chart. The next week it was at No. 5 on the Top Adds chart, and had made its debut at No. 44 on the Rock Albums chart. For the week of 30 January, the album peaked at No. 3 on the Top Adds chart and held the position for an additional week. For the week of 13 March, the album peaked at No. 24 on the Rock Albums chart and held that position for an additional week. The album peaked at No. 133 on the Record World Albums 101-200 chart for the week of 20 March. It was still in the chart at No. 183 for the week of 10 April.

==== "Anyway, Anytime" ====
"Anyway, Anytime" backed with "Don't Say Goodnite to Rock and Roll" was released on MCA MCA-52010 in 1982. According to Jack Snyder of KMET in Los Angeles, California, the album Wrabit looked like a strong rock & roll record and "Anyway, Anytime" was the track that they were playing the most. Ron Nenni of WPYX in Albany New York seemed to be annoyed that the group's name was spelt as Wrabit with a "W" which confused things. He said that "Anytime" was a natural and they were expecting good sales.

"Anyway, Anytime" was reviewed in the 6 March 1982 issue of Record World. The reviewer wrote that the hard rocker had a hook aimed at the AOR and pop venues. The guitar licks and soaring choruses surrounding Lou Nadeau's vocals was also noted.

For the week of 13 February, "Anyway, Anytime" debuted at No. 36 on the Billboard Rock Albums Top Tracks chart. "Anyway, Anytime" peaked at No. 17 on the Top Tracks chart for the week of 20 March.

=== Tracks ===
The album Tracks was released on MCA 5349-J in 1982. It debuted at No. 95 on the 'RPM 100 Albums chart for the week of 2 October 1982. For the week of 16 October it was at No. 93. For the week of 6 November, in its sixth charting week, it had dropped down from No. 92 to 96.

The songs from the album were performed at Queensbury Arms in Toronto. After the show, group member, Lou Nadeau caught up with MCA national album promotion director Don Wesley, president of MCA Distributing corp. Al Bergamo and 0107 air personality Keith Elshaw.

==== "Don't Lose that Feeling" ====
The single from the Tracks album was "Don't Lose that Feeling". It was one of the Billboard Top Single Picks for the week of 25 September 1982. It got into the Top 40.

=== West Side Kid ===
Around mid-September, the third album for Wrabit, West Side Kid was released on MCA. It was produced by David Bendeth. It was recorded and mixed at Metalworks Studios. At the time the band was made up of Lou Nadeau on vocals, John Albani on guitar, Chris Brockway on bass, Gary Craig on drums, Lou Pomanti on keyboards and John Rutledge on backing vocals. The single that was released was "Say Lady Say". Their label was expected to do a National promotional push on the album.

== Break up ==
The group broke up in 1983.

Gary McCracken, John Albani and Gerald O'Brien played on Lisa Price's Priceless mini-album that was recorded at the Phase-One Studio in Toronto and released in 1983.

John Albani became musically involved with rock singer Lee Aaron. He later set up a recording studio in Nashville.

== Members ==
- Lou Nadeau - vocals
- John Albani - guitar
- David Aplin - guitar
- David Kirby - keyboards
- Les Paulhus - keyboards, vocals (replaced Kirby in 1981)
- Gerald O’Brien - keyboards (replaced Paulhus in 1982)
- Lou Pomanti - keyboards (replaced O’Brien in 1983)
- Ron Smith - bass
- Chris Brockway - bass, vocals (replaced Smith in 1981)
- Scott "Jeff" Steck - drums
- Gary McCracken - drums (replaced Steck in 1981)

== Discography ==
=== Singles ===
- "Back Home" / "How Does She Do It" - MCA MCA-51208 - 1981
- "Anyway, Anytime" / "Don’t Say Goodnite to Rock and Roll" - MCA MCA-52010 - 1981
- "Too Many Years" / "Just Go Away" - MCA - MCA-767 - 1981 (UK)
- "Don’t Lose That Feeling" / "Don’t Lose That Feeling" - MCA MCA-52117 - 1982
- "Say Lady Say" / "Sing Boy" - MCA MCA-52277 - 1983

=== Albums ===
- Wrough & Wready - Attitude/MCA MCA-5268 - 1981
- Tracks - Attitude/MCA MCA-5359 - 1982
- West Side Kid - Attitude/MCA MCA-39005 - 1983

=== Compilation appearances ===
- Striktly for Konnoisseurs’ - Music for Nations MFN-32 - 1984 (US)
