= David Stone (keyboardist) =

Canadian keyboard player

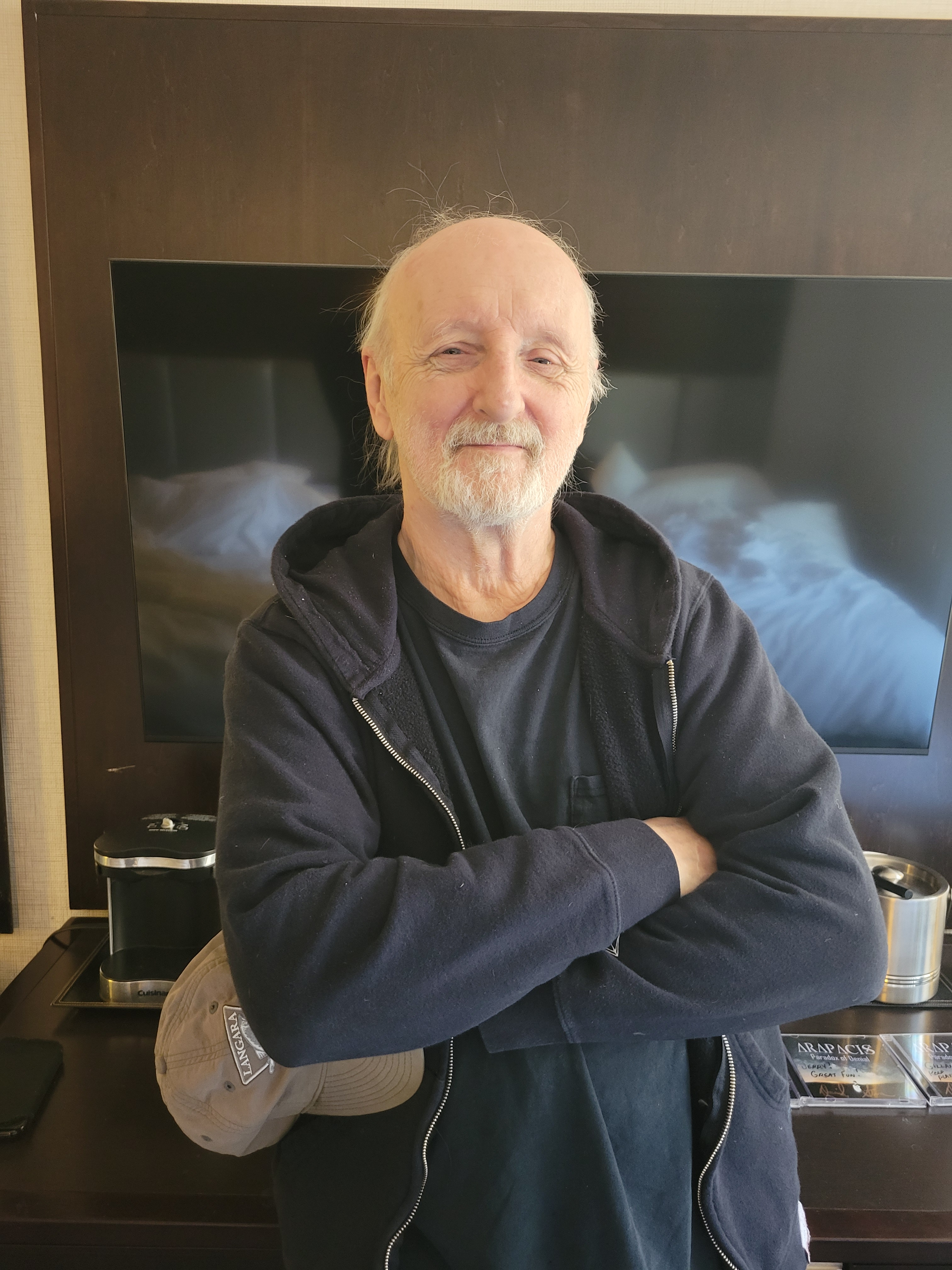
- David Stone January 2022

Background information
- Born: Michael David Stoyanoff; March 20, 1953 (age 73); Toronto, Ontario, Canada,
- Genres: Progressive rock, hard rock, heavy metal
- Instrument: Keyboards

David Stone (born Michael David Stoyanoff on March 20, 1953) is a Canadian keyboard player best known for playing with Rainbow. He later joined Max Webster for their album Universal Juveniles.

Born in Toronto, Ontario, Canada, Stone worked on the Bud Matton Agency tour circuit and played in the band Symphonic Slam, whose self-titled and only album released in 1976 went gold in Japan. He then joined Rainbow, and was voted the fifth best keyboardist in the world in the Japanese magazine Music Life in January 1978. After performing on Long Live Rock 'n' Roll, he returned to Canada and played with Max Webster and singer B. B. Gabor. In 1991, Stone played on a demo by US prog metal band Vision. Stone also played on the hard rock/prog metal band AraPacis' 2019 album Paradox of Denial and joined the band in September 2019. He also played on AraPacis' 2020 EP Déja Hard, their 2021 full length Waterdog and their 2022 full length Suburban Mist. Stone was formerly married to award-winning journalist Madelaine Drohan.

== Discography ==
=== Symphonic Slam ===
- Symphonic Slam (1976)

=== Rainbow ===
- Long Live Rock 'n Roll (1978)
- Live in Munich 1977 (2006)

=== BB Gabor ===
- BB Gabor (1980)

=== Max Webster ===
- Universal Juveniles (1980)

=== AraPacis ===
- Déjà Hard (2020)
- Waterdog (2021)
- Suburban Mist (2022)

=== Avi Rosenfeld ===
- Very Heepy Very Purple XI (2020)
