= Anyway, Anytime =

Song by Wrabit

from the album Wrabit
- Released: 1981
- Label: MCA MCA-52010
- Composer: Lou Nadeau
- Producers: Paul Gross; Executive producers Michael Rosen and Lawrence Elliott Steinberg

"Anyway, Anytime" is a song by Wrabit. It became a radio hit in 1982, charting in the United States on the Billboard Rock Albums Top Tracks chart and the FMQB Album Report Song Index chart.

== Background ==
"Anyway", Anytime" was composed by Lou Nadeau. Backed with "Don't Say Goodnite to Rock and Roll", "Anyway, Anytime" was released on MCA MCA-52010 in 1982. Both sides of the single were produced by Paul Gross. It is the first song on side one of Wrabit's album. The chart success for "Anyway, Anytime" was due to the album track's success rather than that of the single.

The song was also covered by the group Passion with Chantale Landry on lead vocals.

== Reception ==
According to Jack Snyder of KMET in Los Angeles, California, the album Wrabit looked like a strong rock & roll record and "Anyway, Anytime" was the track that they were playing the most. Ron Nenni of WPYX in Albany New York seemed to be annoyed that the group's name was spelt as Wrabit with a "W" which confused things. He said that "Anytime" was a natural and they were expecting good sales.

"Anyway, Anytime" was reviewed in the 6 March 1982 issue of Record World. The reviewer wrote that the hard rocker had a hook aimed at the AOR and pop venues. The guitar licks and soaring choruses surrounding Lou Nadeau's vocals was also noted.

== Airplay ==
According to the 15 January issue of the FMQB Report, Wrabit had just come off their Canadian tour with band Triumph to discover that a growing number of major album rock stations had been playing tracks off of their album which included "Anyway, Anytime" and three others.

== Charts ==
For the week of 13 February, "Anyway, Anytime" debuted at No. 36 on the Billboard Rock Albums Top Tracks chart. "Anyway, Anytime" peaked at No. 17 on the Top Tracks chart for the week of 20 March. In its eighth charting week, it was still in the Rock Albums Top Tracks chart at No. 47 for the week of 3 April.

By the week of 12 February, "Anyway, Anytime" was already underway in the FMQB Album Report Song Index chart, where it had moved up from No. 27 to No. 23. For the week of 5 March, "Anyway, Anytime" peaked at No. 19 on the FMQB Album Report Song Index chart. It was still in the chart at No. 73 for the week of 2 April.
