= Roll the Bones =

Studio album by Rush
- Released: September 3, 1991
- Recorded: February–May 1991
- Studios: Le Studio (Morin-Heights, Quebec); McClear Place (Toronto, Ontario)
- Genres: Pop rock; hard rock; funk rock
- Length: 48:04
- Label: Anthem
- Producers: Rupert Hine; Rush

Rush chronology
Chronicles (1990)	Roll the Bones (1991)	Counterparts (1993)

Singles from Roll the Bones
- 1. "Dreamline" Released: September 1991; 2. "Roll the Bones" Released: February 1992; 3. "Ghost of a Chance" Released: April 1992

Roll the Bones is the fourteenth studio album by the Canadian rock band Rush, released on September 3, 1991 by Anthem Records in Canada and Atlantic Records internationally. Produced by the band and Rupert Hine, the album continued the shift away from the keyboard-heavy arrangements of the 1980s toward a more guitar-oriented sound, a transition that had begun with their previous release, Presto (1989). The sessions, primarily held at Le Studio in Morin-Heights, Quebec saw the band embracing funk and jazz influences, most notably in the title track's inclusion of a rap segment performed by bassist Geddy Lee.

Lyrically, the album explores themes of chance, fate and the weight of circumstances, inspired by drummer Neil Peart's interest in the role of fortune in human life. The title is a slang term for rolling dice, a motif reflected in the Juno Award-winning cover art designed by Hugh Syme. The Grammy-nominated instrumental "Where's My Thing?" marked the band's first instrumental track since 1981.

Roll the Bones was a commercial success, reaching No. 3 on the Billboard 200—the band's highest US chart position since Signals (1982)—and achieving platinum certification from the Recording Industry Association of America. Critical reception was generally positive with reviewers praising the group's renewed musical energy and melodic focus, although some music critics were polarized by the title track's rap section. It has been remastered several times, most recently in 2015 by Sean McGee at Abbey Road Studios. The album remains a significant entry in Rush's discography, bridging their synth-rock era with the leaner, heavier sound of their 1990s work.

== Background and writing ==
In June 1990, Rush finished touring their previous album, Presto (1989). They purposely kept the tour short, which Lee said was due to the group feeling overcautious about touring the album. However, it became an enjoyable and positive experience for them and by the time it finished, "we were so charged up we wanted to keep on playing." This renewed energy in the band carried through to the writing and recording sessions for Roll the Bones. They then took a break but decided to cut it short in order to start work on new material for a follow-up record.

As with Presto, Rush started work by retreating to Chalet Studios, a remote studio in Claremont, Ontario. They stayed for 2 1/2 months, with Lee and Lifeson working on the music while Peart wrote lyrics. The three would reconvene in the evenings when Peart would hear what the other two had come up with during the day. Lee had developed an interest in bird watching and ensured some broken bird feeders by the studio window were repaired and filled with feed, which he enjoyed observing while writing. The album's liner notes include a thanks to birds.

The demos were recorded using an eight-track TASCAM 388 recorder and an integrated mixer hooked up to a sequencer running C-Lab Notator software. Lee set up simple drum patterns on the computer for Lifeson and himself to work from. It took between nine and ten weeks to write and rehearse for the album and eight weeks to record it.

The album displays the continued change in the group's sound which started on Presto, with a reduction in keyboards and a return to guitar-driven songs. Lee said the change was "a backlash against the more computer-style of writing" which had dominated their sound through the 1980s, and the band now chose to use synthesizers and sequencers as an "orchestration device" rather than a key component in the songwriting. The writing sessions for Presto had involved just bass, guitar and vocals, which contributed to the style shift and the group continued with this approach for Roll the Bones. Another aspect that carried over from Presto was Lee's intention to create strong vocal melodies at the beginning and base the rest of the tune around it. Lifeson had wanted to try playing funk rhythms and, after having attempted it on Presto, wished to explore it further on Roll the Bones. The majority of the arrangements worked out at the writing stage remained unchanged, which allowed the group to use the demos as a guide for recording, done by transferring the completed demos to 24-track and re-recording the parts.

The album contains a running lyrical theme concerning the element of chance in different aspects of life, which Peart had devised while experimenting with lyrics. The first lyric that he wrote for the album was used on "Face Up", specifically: "Turn it up – or turn that wild card down." He recalled sitting on his cottage floor "with a pile of papers around me" of notes from the previous two years, mostly consisting of phrases written on tour or during "that dreamlike moment before sleep." He started to experiment with the phrases "turn it up" and "turn it down", which led to the idea of turning a card down and a wild card and applied them to events that a person may face.

== Recording ==
Roll the Bones was recorded at Le Studio in Morin-Heights, Quebec, and McClear Place in Toronto, between February and May 1991. The band resumed working with co-producer Rupert Hine and engineer Stephen Tayler, both of whom had worked on Presto. The vocals were recorded in England. Rush wanted to continue to work with Hine due to his accomplished songwriting, the feedback he gave their songs and his ability to allow the group to achieve a looser sound than previous albums. Lee said that various production tricks they had learned from working with Peter Collins in the 1980s were used on Presto and Roll the Bones.

The bass and drum parts were recorded in four days, and the guitars in eight. Lee was amazed at how Peart had learned his parts for an entire song prior to recording it, and that "Nine times out of 10 it took only one pass for him to nail it." The band had originally planned to release the album in January 1992, but they finished it two months early. They thanked the news channel CNN in the liner notes, as they had the channel on while writing; Lee recalled it was sometimes difficult to stop watching it while numerous events were taking place.

Lee used two different Wal basses on the album. He liked its mid-range and "rich" bottom end sound, and the fact that he did not have to add much equalisation. He first learned of the instrument when the band were recording in England. Lee knew that bassist Percy Jones used one on Brand X albums, of which he was a big fan. He had played one at the suggestion of Peter Collins during the recording of Power Windows (1985). Lee's bass was mixed closer to Peart's bass drum range, which freed up space in the music for guitar parts. Peart also changed his sound, and while he did not make a conscious decision to avoid electronics altogether, he found that most of the songs did not benefit from him playing an electronic kit and instead mostly used acoustic drums. Peart realized that he had a tendency to make his drum parts "too organized, too architectural" on an album, so for Roll the Bones, he deliberately left portions of songs unrehearsed and recorded them on the day of recording with the intention of capturing more spontaneous playing.

Peart wrote that the group found each stage of the recording process particularly enjoyable and satisfying, which sparked a "new conviction, a sense of rebirth" within the group. Lee described the writing sessions for the album as "very positive" and "optimistic".

== Artwork ==
The cover was designed by longtime Rush associate Hugh Syme. The liner notes contain the cryptic phrase "Now it's dark." Peart later revealed that the phrase occurs in the 1986 film Blue Velvet. The credits include a running joke that began on Power Windows, when the group noticed several song titles began with the letter "M". For "various reasons", they continued the gag on Roll the Bones, with "Brought to you by the letter B."

== Songs ==
=== Side one ===
The opening verse of "Dreamline" has references to astronomy, which Peart was inspired by after bicycling a hundred miles from Cincinnati to Columbus between two gigs on the Presto tour. Upon arrival, he watched the popular science series Nova on PBS, and a program on satellite imaging captured his imagination.

"Bravado" deals with how one should not give up after failing, as opposed to ending life by suicide, which Peart had addressed in "The Pass" on Presto. The song was particularly emotional for Lee, who rated it as one of the band's best ever songs, partly due to its different texture than the rest of the album. The band was optimistic about its musical form but faced the problem of overworking its arrangement because all the parts sounded good to them. In the end, they learned that stripping the song back resulted in a stronger track.

"Roll the Bones" was named after a science fiction story by Fritz Leiber that Peart had read some 15 years prior, titled "Gonna Roll the Bones". Though the story had no influence on the music or its message, Peart took a liking to the particular phrase and had kept it in his notebook. The phrase is also a slang term for rolling dice. When the band was recording "Roll the Bones", Lee said they decided to "have some fun" with it and include a rap section. Peart recalled some skepticism from his bandmates at first and they tried different ways to present it, including a female voice, but "the transition was too harsh." They instead opted to use Lee's voice with low-frequency effects applied to it.

"Where's My Thing?" was the band's first instrumental since "YYZ" from Moving Pictures (1981). It has the humorous subtitle of "Part IV, 'Gangster of Boats' Trilogy", referring to an inside joke where Lee and Lifeson threatened to name a Rush album Gangster of Boats if Peart ever had difficulty coming up with a title, as well as the joke that it is the fourth part of a trilogy. Peart wrote that the group had wanted to record an instrumental for a while at this point and that the group had "a lot of fun" recording it. They had wanted to include one on Presto; however, every time Lee and Lifeson had a piece of music, Peart provided a lyric that fit well with it. For this album, Peart let the two write an instrumental track and deliberately avoided providing them lyrics until they had put one together. Rather than making the track a showcase for the group's playing ability, Lee and Lifeson wanted to give it a verse and chorus section to make it sound like a "genuine song".

=== Side two ===
"Heresy" is a more straightforward rock song with a rhythm that Lee described as a "heart beat pulse" that reflected some of Peart's lyrical ideas for it. Peart was inspired by the events surrounding the fall of Communism in Eastern Europe in the early 1990s and people regaining their freedoms.

"Ghost of a Chance" features Lifeson playing a PRS guitar, and he rated his solo on the track as one of his best. Lyrically the song is based on the compromises that one makes in a relationship to make it work. Peart was particularly proud of his words for it, as he had written a love song that avoided the clichés of more typical, sentimental love song lyrics.

Lee said that, despite the fun involved in writing "You Bet Your Life", it was the most difficult to record, partly due to getting a balance in the chorus between the vocals and the vocal melody. It was also hard to mix, and Lee "never felt confident that we actually nailed [it]."

== Release and promotion ==
Roll the Bones was released on September 3, 1991. It marked a return to commercial success for the band, reaching No. 3 in the US, their highest charting album since Moving Pictures (1981). It also reached No. 10 in the UK and No. 11 in Canada. "Dreamline" reached No. 1 on the US Billboard Album Rock Tracks chart. In 1992, "Where's My Thing? (Part IV, "Gangster of Boats" Trilogy)" became Rush's second song to be nominated for a Grammy Award for Best Rock Instrumental Performance. The song lost to "Cliffs of Dover" by Eric Johnson, who opened for Rush on the 1991 leg of the Roll the Bones Tour.

Rush toured the album between October 1991 and July 1992, covering Canada, the United States, mainland Europe and the UK. As they had a productive and positive experience making the album, they were keen to go on the road and tour the album; indeed, Rush toured Roll the Bones longer than they had for Presto.

== Reception ==
Professional ratings
Review scores
Source	Rating
AllMusic	3/5 stars
The Encyclopedia of Popular Music	2/5 stars
Entertainment Weekly	B
The Essential Rock Discography	5/10
MusicHound Rock	2.5/5 stars
The Rolling Stone Album Guide	2.5/5 stars
The Virgin Encyclopedia of 80s Music	2/5 stars
The Collector's Guide To Heavy Metal	5/10

Chuck Eddy of Entertainment Weekly felt the album treaded new ground, noting its "usual melodic nods toward MTV metal and 19th-century concert halls" now had "rhythmic nods toward Nintendo games and West Africa." Eddy also noted the rap in the title track, concluding, "For once, these guys seem to be acting silly on purpose."

In retrospective reviews, Eduardo Rivadavia of AllMusic called Roll the Bones "quite possibly Rush's darkest album" lyrically, citing "Dreamline" as one of the band's best songs of the 1990s. He added that, "though their negative subject matter can feel stifling at times, fine tracks like 'Bravado,' 'The Big Wheel,' and 'Heresy' feature wonderful melodies and arrangements." Ultimate Classic Rock included Roll the Bones on their list of "Top 100 90's Rock Albums". They also ranked it the 9th (out of 19) best Rush album, with Dave Swanson writing, "even though synths still clang about and a few of the experiments go too far (um, yes, that's Geddy Lee rapping on the title track), the songwriting is stupendous."

== Track listing ==
All lyrics are written by Neil Peart; all music is composed by Alex Lifeson and Geddy Lee.

Roll the Bones track listing
No.	Title	Length
1.	"Dreamline"	4:37
2.	"Bravado"	4:35
3.	"Roll the Bones"	5:30
4.	"Face Up"	3:54
5.	"Where's My Thing? (Part IV, "Gangster of Boats" Trilogy)" (instrumental)	3:49
6.	"The Big Wheel"	5:13
7.	"Heresy"	5:27
8.	"Ghost of a Chance"	5:18
9.	"Neurotica"	4:39
10.	"You Bet Your Life"	5:01

== Personnel ==
Rush

- Geddy Lee – bass guitar, vocals, synthesizers
- Alex Lifeson – electric and acoustic guitars, backing vocals
- Neil Peart – drums, cymbals

Additional musician

- Rupert Hine – additional keyboards, background vocals

Production

- Rush – production, arrangements
- Rupert Hine – production, arrangements
- Stephen W. Tayler – recording and mixing engineer
- Simon Pressey – assistant engineer at Le Studio
- Paul Seeley – assistant engineer at McClear Place
- Ben Darlow – mix assistant
- Everett Ravestein – pre-production assistant at Lerxst Sound
- Bob Ludwig – original mastering
- Andrew MacNaughtan – portraits
- Scarpati – photography
- Joe Berndt – digitals
- Hugh Syme – art direction, design
- Anthem Records (Liam Birt) – executive production

== Charts ==
=== Weekly charts ===
Chart (1991)	Peak position
Canada Top Albums/CDs (RPM)	11
Dutch Albums (Album Top 100)	38
Finnish Albums (Suomen virallinen lista)	6
German Albums (Offizielle Top 100)	35
Swedish Albums (Sverigetopplistan)	31
UK Albums (Official Charts)	10
US Billboard 200	3

Chart (2025)	Peak position
Hungarian Physical Albums (MAHASZ)	27

=== Year-end charts ===
Chart (1991)	Position
Canadian Albums (RPM)	55

== Certifications ==
Region	Certification	Certified units/sales
Canada (Music Canada)	Platinum	100,000^{^}
United States (RIAA)	Platinum	1,000,000^{^}
^{^} Shipments figures based on certification alone.
