= High Class in Borrowed Shoes =

Studio album by Max Webster
- Released: 16 May 1977
- Recorded: 28 November 1976 – March 1977
- Studio: Toronto Sound (Toronto, Canada)
- Genre: Hard rock
- Length: 37:54
- Label: Anthem (Canada); Mercury (US)
- Producer: Max Webster, Terry Brown, Tom Berry

Max Webster chronology
Max Webster (1976)	High Class in Borrowed Shoes (1977)	Mutiny Up My Sleeve (1978)

Singles from High Class in Borrowed Shoes
- 1. "Words to Words" / "In Context of the Moon" Released: 1977; 2. "Diamonds Diamonds" / "Rain Child" Released: 1977

High Class in Borrowed Shoes is the second album by Canadian rock band Max Webster. The album was released in 1977 and has been certified gold by the Canadian Recording Industry Association.

The album was released in the US and Europe on the Mercury Records label.

== Critical reception ==
Professional ratings
Review scores
Source	Rating
AllMusic	4.5/5 stars
Collector's Guide to Heavy Metal	10/10

The Timmins Daily Press listed High Class in Borrowed Shoes as the 25th best Canadian rock/pop album of the 20th century.

== Track listing ==
All songs written by Kim Mitchell & Pye Dubois, except where noted.

Side one

1. "High Class in Borrowed Shoes" – 4:00
2. "Diamonds Diamonds" – 3:18
3. "Gravity" – 4:53
4. "Words to Words" – 3:34
5. "America's Veins" – 4:08

Side two

1. "Oh War! – 4:25
2. "On the Road" – 3:25
3. "Rain Child" (Terry Watkinson) – 4:22
4. "In Context of the Moon" – 5:13

== Personnel ==
All credits adapted from the original release.

Max Webster

- Kim Mitchell – guitars and lead vocals
- Terry Watkinson – keyboards, vocals and lead vocals on "Rain Child"
- Mike Tilka – bass guitar, ARP bass and vocals
- Gary McCracken – drums and percussion
- Pye Dubois – lyrics

Production

- Terry Brown – producer, engineer, mixing
- Ken Morris – assistant engineer
- Hugh Syme – album design and cover illustration
- Bob King – album design
- David Street – photography
- Tom Berry – executive producer
