= Dreamline =

Single by Rush

from the album Roll the Bones
- Released: September 1991
- Recorded: 1991
- Genre: Hard rock
- Length: 4:38
- Label: Anthem (Canada); Atlantic
- Songwriter(s): Geddy Lee, Alex Lifeson, Neil Peart
- Producer(s): Rupert Hine, Rush

Rush singles chronology
"The Pass" (1990)	"Dreamline" (1991)	"Roll the Bones" (1992)

"Dreamline" is a song by the Canadian rock band Rush. It was released as a single and on their 1991 album Roll the Bones. The song peaked at number one on the U.S. Mainstream Rock Tracks chart.

Bassist and singer Geddy Lee said: "I love the spirit of 'Dreamline' and the way Neil captures that feeling of wanderlust and invulnerability that comes in a particular trying time in your life."

== Reception ==
Martin Popoff said that the song is "strafed by a crouching-then-striking verse and clouds-breaking chorus. It’s a track that proved to be strong enough to open the Different Stages live album seven years later then stay tenaciously in the set for the Vapor Trails tour."

AllMusic writer Eduardo Rivadavia called the song "gutsy" and also said that "Dreamline" is one of their best songs from the '90s.

== Track listing ==
No.	Title	Lyrics	Music	Length
1.	"Dreamline"	Peart	Rush	4:38

== Personnel ==
- Geddy Lee - synthesizer, bass, vocals
- Alex Lifeson - acoustic and electric guitars, vocals
- Neil Peart - drums, lyrics

== See also ==
- List of Billboard Mainstream Rock number-one songs of the 1990s
- List of Rush songs
