= Roll the Bones (song) =

- Vinyl album sleeve, US Release

Single by Rush

from the album Roll the Bones
- B-side: Face Up (Can); Show Don't Tell (UK); Tom Sawyer (Live) (Germany)
- Released: February 1992 (UK)
- Recorded: 1991
- Genre: Funk rock; rap rock
- Length: 5:30
- Label: Anthem (Canada); Atlantic (US)
- Composers: Geddy Lee; Alex Lifeson
- Lyricist: Neil Peart
- Producers: Rupert Hine; Rush

Rush singles chronology
"Dreamline" (1991)	"Roll the Bones" (1992)	"Ghost of a Chance" (1992)

"Roll the Bones" is a song by the Canadian rock band Rush. It was released as the second single from their 1991 album of the same name.

== Background ==
The music of "Roll the Bones" was written by Geddy Lee and Alex Lifeson, and its lyrics by Neil Peart. The lyrics reflect on taking chances in life, and urging those unsure to "roll the bones," a term used for throwing dice.

"But the bottom line...is to take the chance, roll the bones, if it's a random universe and that's terrifying and it makes you neurotic and everything, never mind. You really have to take the chance or else nothing's going to happen."

- Neil Peart, "It's a Rap" interview, February 1992

As a "lyrical experiment", Peart wrote a "rap" section in his lyrics, as a result of listening to "the better rap writers", like LL Cool J and Public Enemy. The band considered seeking out a real rapper to perform this section of the song; they also considered approaching the section with a camp or comedic sensibility, and hiring singer-songwriter Robbie Robertson or actor/comedian John Cleese. According to Lee, "We couldn't make up our minds really if we wanted to be influenced by rap or satirize it, so I think that song kind of falls between the cracks and in the end I think it came out to be neither, it came out to be something that is very much us." Ultimately, the "rap" was performed by Lee: his altered voice is achieved through a drastic lowering of pitch and adding various effects.

== Live performance ==
"Roll the Bones" would be played on every Rush tour since the song's release, up to the 2007-2008 Snakes And Arrows Tour, when it was removed from the setlist. It continued to not appear in the setlists of the following two tours. In 2015, the song was put back in the setlist for the Rush R40 Tour. The R40 performance features an accompanying video for the rap section that had lip synching cameos from Peter Dinklage, Chad Smith, Jay Baruchel, Les Claypool, Tom Morello, Paul Rudd, Jason Segel, and Trailer Park Boys actors John Paul Tremblay, Robb Wells, and Mike Smith.

== Track listing ==
All music by Alex Lifeson and Geddy Lee and lyrics by Neil Peart.

Canada Cassette single:

1. Roll the Bones – 5:30
2. Face Up - 3:54

UK 7" release:

1. Roll The Bones – 5:30
2. Show Don't Tell – 5:01

UK Picture Disc release:

1. Roll the Bones – 5:30
2. The Pass – 4:51
3. It's a Rap (Part 1: Alex Lifeson Speaks)

UK 2-Disc Limited Edition release:
Disc 1

1. Roll the Bones – 5:30
2. Anagram (For Mongo) – 3:59
3. It's a Rap (Part 2: Geddy Lee Speaks)

Disc 2

1. Roll the Bones – 5:30
2. Where's My Thing? (Part IV, "Gangster of Boats" Trilogy) – 3:49
3. Superconductor – 4:47
4. It's a Rap (Part 3: Neil Peart Speaks)

German 7" release:

1. Roll the Bones – 5:30
2. Tom Sawyer (Live) – 5:06

12" release

1. Roll the Bones – 5:30
2. Tom Sawyer (Live) – 5:06
3. Spirit of Radio (Live)

== Personnel ==
- Geddy Lee – synthesizer, bass guitar, lead vocals, "rapper"
- Alex Lifeson – guitars, backing vocals
- Neil Peart – drums

== Charts ==
Chart (1991–1992)	Peak position
Canada Top Singles (RPM)	25
UK Singles (Official Charts)	49
US Mainstream Rock Airplay (Billboard)	9

== See also ==
- List of Rush songs
