= Coney Hatch =

Canadian rock band

- Origin: Toronto, Ontario, Canada
- Genre: Hard rock
- Years active: 1982–present

Coney Hatch is a Canadian hard rock band who released three albums in the 1980s and released their album Four in 2013 and a live double album on vinyl, Postcard From Germany in 2023. Based in Toronto, Ontario, Canada, the band in its early days, consisted of bassist Andy Curran, guitarist Steve Shelski and drummer Dave 'Thumper' Ketchum and in February 1981 brought vocalist and guitarist Carl Dixon. Soon after Dixon joined the band on lead vocals they were signed to a record deal with Anthem (Canada), and Polygram Mercury. The band was known for its loud live shows. In 2023, the band played Sweden Rock Festival to positive reviews. The band tours on a limited basis. Sean Kelly joined the lineup in 2014 replacing Steve Shelski.

== History ==
Coney Hatch formed in 1981, and began performing and developing original material. The band was named after the Colney Hatch Lunatic Asylum (1851–1993) in London.

The band's first album was produced by Kim Mitchell of Max Webster and released in 1982. That album went gold featuring Devil's Deck and Hey Operator. Ketchum left the band in 1983, and was replaced by Barry Connors, for the Friction album. Connors formerly drummed with the band Toronto.

In 1982 the band opened for Judas Priests screaming for Vengeance tour. In 1983, Coney Hatch opened for Iron Maiden for 42 shows on the North American Piece of Mind Tour.

The band performed at the Hollywood Palladium in 1985 with Rough Cutt and Accept.

In April 2008, Carl Dixon was very seriously injured in a car accident in Australia, leaving him with traumatic brain injury and extensive titanium implants and a glass eye. On August 5, 2010, the original Coney Hatch line up including the injured Carl Dixon played a reunion show at the Phoenix Concert Theatre in Toronto. It was the first performance from the original line up since 1993. Two days later they played in Hamilton, Ontario, at The Festival of Friends. They were the second to last act on the main stage. The final act of the night was Gord Downie.

A further live date was scheduled for the Firefest rock festival in Nottingham, England, on October 23, 2011. Coney Hatch performed at the Rock n' Roar weekend event in August 2013, in Spanish, Ontario. Coney Hatch again featured at Firefest, Nottingham in October 2014. In 2018, Coney Hatch announced an eight dates tour from October to December, with Sean Kelly on lead guitar in place of Steve Shelski. Coney Hatch toured to packed venues with Steve Harris's British Lion in Ontario and Quebec. and went on to favourable reviews playing H.E.A.T. Festival Ludwigsburg, Germany. Sweden Rock Festival and Hamburg Summer Festival in 2023.

In November 2023, Coney Hatch performed at Firefest Festival (10 Years After) in the UK at Manchester Academy on October 11–13, 2024. The band preceded headline act Heavy Pettin on the Friday night.

== Membership ==
Current members are:

- Andy Curran
- Dave Ketchum
- Carl Dixon
- Sean Kelly

Former members:

- Paul Van Remortel
- Eddy Godlewski
- Paul Marangoni
- Phil Naro
- Barry Connors
- Steve Shelski
- Kevin James LaBrie

== Discography ==
=== Albums ===
- Coney Hatch (1982), released internationally by Mercury-PolyGram Records and Casablanca Records (Japan)
- Outa Hand (1983)
- Friction (1985)
- Best of Three (1992)
- Four (2013)
- Live at the El Mocambo (2021)
- Postcard from Germany (Live) (2023)

=== Singles ===
- 1982: "Devil's Deck" [music video]
- 1982: "Hey Operator" (No. 19 Canada)
- 1983: "Don't Say Make Me"
- 1983: "First Time for Everything" [music video]
- 1983: "Shake It" [music video]
- 1985: "Fantasy" [music video]
- 1985: "Girl from Last Night's Dream"
- 1985: "She's Gone"
- 1985: "This Ain't Love" (U.K.)
