= Ray Danniels =

Canadian music executive

Ray Danniels is a Canadian music executive, record producer, and talent manager. He's the founder of SRO (Standing Room Only) Management group, as well as independent record labels Moon Records and Anthem Records. He first rose to prominence as the manager of the Canadian bands Rush, Max Webster, and Kim Mitchell. He later served as the manager of Extreme, King's X, and Van Halen. Sammy Hagar says in his autobiography Red that Danniels was responsible for the fracturing of Van Halen in 1996.

He was awarded the Walt Grealis Special Achievement Award at the 2015 Juno Awards.
