= Max Webster (album) =

Studio album by Max Webster
- Released: 3 May 1976
- Recorded: 4 May – October 1975
- Studios: Toronto Sound (Toronto, Canada)
- Genres: Hard rock, progressive rock
- Length: 36:10
- Label: Taurus
- Producers: Max Webster, Terry Brown, Tom Berry

Max Webster chronology
Max Webster (1976)	High Class in Borrowed Shoes (1977)

Singles from Max Webster
- 1. "Blowing the Blues Away" / "Hangover" Released: 1976

US edition cover

Professional ratings
Review scores
Source	Rating
AllMusic	4.5/5 stars
Collector's Guide to Heavy Metal	10/10

Max Webster was the first record released by Canadian rock band Max Webster. The record was released in 1976 on Taurus Records, a short-lived label created by Rush manager Ray Danniels. The album was re-issued in January 1977 by Anthem Records in Canada and on Mercury Records in the US, with the title Hangover and different artwork.

Max Webster was certified gold in 1979 by the Canadian Recording Industry Association.

== Track listing ==
All songs written by Kim Mitchell and Pye Dubois, except where indicated

Side one

1. "Hangover" – 4:36
2. "Here Among the Cats" – 3:07
3. "Blowing the Blues Away" (Terry Watkinson) – 3:33
4. "Summer Turning Blue" – 3:05
5. "Toronto Tontos" – 3:40

Side two

1. "Coming Off the Moon" – 3:38
2. "Only Your Nose Knows" – 4:16
3. "Summer's Up" – 2:45
4. "Lily" (Mitchell) – 7:42

== Personnel ==
Max Webster

- Kim Mitchell – guitars and lead vocals
- Terry Watkinson – keyboards and vocals, cover art and design
- Mike Tilka – bass and vocals
- Paul Kersey – drums and percussion
- Pye Dubois – lyrics

Production

- Terry Brown – producer, engineer
- Tom Berry – executive producer
- Ray Danniels, Vic Wilson (SRO Productions Inc.) – management
- Jon Erickson, Robert Gunn – road crew
