= Mutiny Up My Sleeve =

Studio album by Max Webster
- Released: 17 April 1978
- Recorded: December 1977 – March 1978
- Studios: Sounds Interchange and Phase One Studios, Toronto, Ontario, Canada
- Genre: Rock
- Length: 38:10
- Labels: Anthem (Canada); Capitol (US, Europe)
- Producers: Max Webster, Mike Tilka, Terry Brown

Max Webster chronology
High Class in Borrowed Shoes (1977)	Mutiny Up My Sleeve (1978)	A Million Vacations (1979)

Professional ratings
Review scores
Source	Rating
AllMusic	3/5 stars
Collector's Guide to Heavy Metal	9/10

Mutiny Up My Sleeve was the third album by Canadian rock band Max Webster. The record was released in 1978 in Canada by Anthem Records and in the United States and Europe by Capitol Records. The album was certified gold by the Canadian Recording Industry Association.

Bassist and founding member Mike Tilka was let go after musical differences with Kim Mitchell came to a head. Billy Sheehan auditioned and joined the band for three weeks in November of 1977 followed by preproduction for Mutiny Up My Sleeve. Recording sessions began in late 1977 at Sounds Interchange with Terry Brown as co-producer and resumed at Phase One Studios in early 1978 with bassist Mike Tilka stepping in after Brown quit. The intro of "The Party" was recorded live at the Seneca College Field House in Toronto, Ontario on December 31, 1977, which was also Tilka's last gig with the band before being replaced by Dave Myles.

In 1988 when the band's back catalog was re-released on CD, the original album cover was amended to include the phrase "Featuring Kim Mitchell" to capitalize on the success of Mitchell's post-Max Webster solo career.

== Track listing ==
All songs written by Kim Mitchell and Pye Dubois, except where indicated

Side one

1. "Lip Service" – 4:02
2. "Astonish Me" (Terry Watkinson) – 4:49
3. "Let Your Man Fly" (Watkinson) – 2:46
4. "Water Me Down" – 3:13
5. "Distressed" – 4:12

Side two

1. "The Party" – 4:46
2. "Waterline" – 4:08
3. "Hawaii" – 3:03
4. "Beyond the Moon" – 6:17

== Personnel ==
Max Webster

- Kim Mitchell – guitars and vocals
- Terry Watkinson – keyboards and vocals
- Dave Myles – bass guitar
- Gary McCracken – drums and percussion
- Pye Dubois – lyrics

Additional musicians

- Carla Jensen, Judy Donnelly – additional vocals on "Distressed" and "Hawaii"

Production

- Mike Tilka – producer, mixing
- Terry Brown – producer
- Mark Wright – engineer, mixing
- Mike Jones – engineer
- Hugh Syme – album design
