= B. B. Gabor =

- Born: Gabor Hegedus; 1948; Hungary
- Died: January 17, 1990 (aged 41–42) Toronto, Ontario, Canada
- Genres: Pop
- Occupation: Singer
- Label: Anthem Records

Gabor Hegedus (1948 – January 17, 1990), known by the stage name BB Gabor, was a Hungarian-born Canadian pop singer. Gabor was best known for his 1980 single "Nyet Nyet Soviet (Soviet Jewellery)", and had other minor hits with "Metropolitan Life", "Consumer" and "Jealous Girl".

== History ==
Gabor fled with his parents to England in 1956 at the time of the Hungarian Revolution. In a 1980 interview by Paul McGrath of The Globe and Mail, the family was said to have made their exit just "one step ahead of the Russian tanks". In the same interview, Gabor recalled that the family first stayed "in a derelict home for sailors in Wapping, probably the dirtiest, darkest area of London". He subsequently moved to Canada at age 23, launching his musical career in Toronto's Queen Street West scene.

He signed as a writer with ATV Music (Publishing). They had him record his self-titled debut album in 1980 and then licensed it to Anthem Records who subsequently release it. If featured the singles "Nyet Nyet Soviet (Soviet Jewellery)", "Metropolitan Life" and "Consumer". He toured across Canada, appeared at the Heatwave festival in August, was nominated for a Juno Award, and won the U-Know for best male vocalist. He released a follow-up album(again ATV/Anthem), Girls of the Future, in 1981, although it was not as successful.

After a few years without a new album, Anthem dropped Gabor from its roster. He subsequently moved to Vancouver, British Columbia (estranging himself from his wife and son in the process), where he attempted to revive his career by working with producer Todd Rundgren, at Rundgren's compound in Woodstock, New York in 1985. These sessions, however, did not result in a new album, and he eventually moved back to Toronto.

On January 17, 1990, Gabor's body was found by police at his Toronto apartment. His death was ruled a suicide reportedly by hanging.

Both of his Anthem albums were re-released on a single CD by the Canadian record label Pacemaker Entertainment in 2001. While Ralph Alfonso was helping Pacemaker with the CD, he asked Gabor's widow if she knew what had happened with the Rundgren sessions; she brought out some cassettes which were only marked "Produced by Todd Rundgren." Alfonso mastered the instrumental "Celtic Cross" directly from one of these cassettes and included it on the 2002 compilation CD Driving in the Rain:3 AM - Songs to Get Lost With on his Bongo Beat label. In the liner notes, he notes that the song might not actually be a Rundgren production.

In 2022, "Nyet Nyet Soviet (Soviet Jewellery)" was used in the TV series Summit '72, about the 1972 Canada Russia hockey series.

== Discography ==
- BB Gabor (1980)
- Girls of the Future (1981)
