= Max Webster =

Canadian rock band

Background information
- Origin: Toronto, Ontario, Canada
- Genres: Hard rock; progressive rock
- Years active: 1972–1981; 1990; 1995–1996; 2007; 2026–present
- Labels: Anthem; Mercury; Capitol; Taurus
- Past members: Kim Mitchell; Terry Watkinson; Mike Tilka; Gary McCracken; Dave Myles; Paul Kersey; Jim Bruton; Phil Trudell; David Stone; Mike Gingrich; Greg Chadd; Steve McMurray; Peter Fredette; Billy Sheehan; Pye Dubois
- Website: maxwebster.ca

Max Webster is a Canadian rock band formed in Toronto in 1972. The band was relatively successful in Canada, with several best-selling albums, and had some minor success in the UK, before dissolving in 1981. The band's founder, Kim Mitchell, subsequently enjoyed a long and successful solo career in Canada. In 2023, the band was inducted into Canada's Walk of Fame.

== Biography ==
Initially a trio for their first gigs in December 1972, the original members were guitarist and vocalist Kim Mitchell, bassist Mike Tilka, and drummer Phil Trudell. The band were briefly called Stinky, then Special Delivery. They settled on Max Webster by early 1973, a name concocted by Tilka while playing with Daryl Stuermer in a Milwaukee band called Family at Mac's (Stuermer had written a song inspired by Ben Webster called "Song for Webster").

The lineup was augmented to a quartet in early 1973 with Jim Bruton being added on keyboards. Paul Kersey replaced Trudell in April 1973, and Terry Watkinson replaced Bruton in February 1974. Max Webster were signed by SRO Management in 1975, and a year later their self-titled debut album, co-produced by Terry Brown, was released. The band quickly gained a reputation on the Toronto bar scene for their humour, stage antics, and repertoire including Jethro Tull and Frank Zappa covers as well as their compositions spanning a wide range of genres. The Mitchell/Tilka/Kersey/Watkinson lineup was the longest-lasting in the band's history, and by 1976 they had over 50 original songs in their catalog.

After a Canadian tour opening for Rush, Kersey left the band and was replaced by Gary McCracken. After recording and touring for their second album, High Class in Borrowed Shoes (1977), Tilka would follow suit and leave the band, being replaced by Dave Myles (although Billy Sheehan was Mitchell's first choice, who did pre-production for their next album while Tilka remained playing gigs). Myles had played with both Mitchell and McCracken in a series of pre-Max Webster bands, all based in their hometown of Sarnia, Ontario.

Mitchell and lyricist Pye Dubois wrote the majority of their material, with their collaboration beginning in Greece in 1972. Watkinson wrote one to three songs per album, and McCracken and Myles would eventually contribute material as well.

Max Webster toured heavily from the mid-1970s to the early 1980s, usually playing 200-250 dates a year in the bars, high schools, theatres, and arenas. Artists they opened for included Bachman–Turner Overdrive, Blondie, The Cars, Cheap Trick, Peter Gabriel, Genesis, The Guess Who, Kansas, Ted Nugent, Rainbow, Rare Earth, REO Speedwagon, Rush, Strawbs, and Styx. By 1978 the band were headliners in most major Canadian markets, although they continued to do extensive tours with Rush outside of Canada, supporting them over 200 times.

Their third album, Mutiny Up My Sleeve (1978), was produced by the band and Terry Brown and their now ex-bassist Mike Tilka (who was now working in the Anthem/SRO office and was called in to finish the album after Brown quit). The Mitchell/Watkinson/McCracken/Myles lineup would last through their fourth album, A Million Vacations, and a subsequent live album, Live Magnetic Air, both of which were issued in 1979 (Brown reunited with the band for the latter).

Though their albums had become FM radio staples in Canada, A Million Vacations was the first Max Webster album to generate hit singles that appeared in the Canadian top 100. The group's first hit was "Let Go the Line," written and sung by Terry Watkinson, and peaked at No. 41 on the Canadian charts. Follow-up single "A Million Vacations" was written by McCracken/Dubois, sung by McCracken, and peaked at No. 80 in Canada. The album's third and final single, "Paradise Skies" was a Mitchell/Dubois composition sung by Mitchell, and was a minor hit in both Canada (number 21) and the UK Singles Chart (number 43).

With some international recognition having arrived, Max Webster then toured the UK and Europe backing Rush in 1979 and played successful dates of their own at the famed Marquee Club in London. However, their career momentum was stalled when the band's American label Capitol Records refused to finance a follow-up headlining European tour. The band returned to the UK over a year later, but poor ticket sales from a lack of promotion led to their shows being cancelled, and only two dates supporting Black Sabbath were fulfilled.

Prior to the recording of the band's fifth and final studio album, Universal Juveniles (1980), Watkinson exited, leaving Max Webster a trio of Mitchell, McCracken, and Myles. Universal Juveniles was recorded with the assistance of session musicians David Stone (who also briefly toured with the band) and Doug Riley. The song "Battle Scar" was recorded live with all three members of Rush playing alongside Max Webster (Watkinson returned just for this session).

Myles left the band immediately after the album was recorded, leaving Mitchell and McCracken as the only serving members. Mitchell soon assembled a new touring lineup with Mike Gingrich on bass, Greg Chadd on keyboards, and Steve McMurray on second guitar. Watkinson eventually rejoined in December 1980 as a salaried touring member, but Mitchell nonetheless decided to dissolve the band after a gig supporting Rush in Memphis, Tennessee on April 16, 1981, primarily citing exhaustion and a lack of label support.

== Legacy and reunions ==
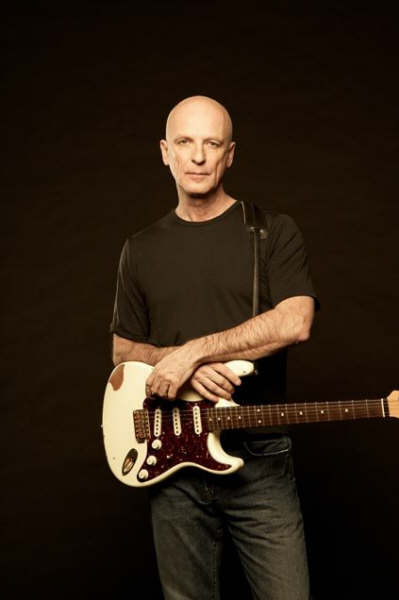
Founding member, vocalist and guitarist Kim Mitchell

Max Webster were close friends of fellow Canadian musicians Rush. In a 1978 interview, Rush bassist and vocalist Geddy Lee commented that he enjoyed their music, insisting "they're quite hard to describe, but they have amazing musicianship and very interesting lyrics."

Although successful in Canada, Max Webster failed to achieve much success elsewhere. "Paradise Skies" was a minor UK hit, reaching No. 43 on the singles chart there. They also appeared on Top of the Pops in 1979, playing to a pre-recorded track that was recorded at Abbey Road Studios. Kim Mitchell's subsequent solo career, however, reached a much broader audience and he achieved popularity beyond Canada during the 1980s.

Among the highlights of the band's career were their New Year's Eve shows at Toronto's Maple Leaf Gardens. Geddy Lee joined the band onstage to sing and play his Teardrop bass guitar for "Battle Scar" on December 31, 1980.

The band reunited in 1990 for a gig at the Toronto Music Awards, with the High Class in Borrowed Shoes lineup of Kim Mitchell, Terry Watkinson, Mike Tilka, and Gary McCracken. Max Webster did a proper reunion tour in 1995–96, with longtime Mitchell collaborator Peter Fredette joining the band as bassist in place of Tilka.

On May 24, 2007, The Mitchell/Watkinson/Tilka/McCracken lineup of Max Webster reunited for a one-off gig as part of the Q107 30th anniversary concert and live radio special at The Docks in Toronto. McCracken sang "A Million Vacations" with his tech Robert Sibony on drums, and Fredette joined the band onstage to sing Geddy Lee's part on "Battle Scar."

From April 2004 until August 2015, Kim Mitchell hosted the weekday afternoon drive slot (2 p.m.-6 p.m.) on Q107 (107.1) in Toronto, Ontario.

In the 1990s Watkinson and Tilka formed the band Antlers, mostly playing Max Webster songs and classic rock covers. The band continued on and off for more than 20 years, playing at various venues around southern Ontario.

Gary McCracken taught music in his hometown of Sarnia, Ontario.

Rock Candy Records in England has re-released the first four Max Webster albums.

In 2017 a box set package called The Party was released by Anthem Records on vinyl, compact disc and digital formats. The release featured remastered versions of all the band's previously released material (with the exception of Hot Spots and Overnight Sensation, which had appeared on Diamonds Diamonds), unreleased live and studio songs, and Kim Mitchell's long out-of-print solo EP. The vinyl set includes a booklet, a poster and a sticker.

Paul Gilbert cites Mitchell's playing on Universal Juveniles to have been a great influence on his guitar style. Music critic and biographer Martin Popoff cites Max Webster as "the finest rock 'n' roll band that ever was".

On September 28, 2023, Max Webster was inducted into Canada's Walk of Fame at the Canada's Rock of Fame induction ceremony at Massey Hall in Toronto. All of the longest serving members of the band attended (Mitchell, Tilka, Kersey, Watkinson, McCracken and Myles).

Australian guitarist Steve McMurray, who joined as a touring member in the final year of the group's initial run, died on March 5, 2014, aged 64.

Four members of group died in 2026: Terry Watkinson died on February 28, at the age of 85, early member Jim Bruton died on June 7, at the age of 78, songwriter Pye Dubois died on September 15, at the age of 77, and Gary McCracken died two days later, September 17, at the age of 75.

In October 2026, a reunion show, billed as "Max Webster featuring Kim Mitchell & Friends", was announced for March 12, 2027 at the OLG Stage at Niagara Fallsview Casino Resort in Niagara Falls, Ontario, as a tribute to Watkinson, Dubois and McCracken.

== Band members ==
- Kim Mitchell – guitar, vocals (1972–1981, 1990, 1995–1996, 2007)
- Terry Watkinson – keyboards, synthesizer, vocals (1974–1980, 1980–1981, 1990, 1995–1996, 2007; died 2026)
- Mike Tilka – bass, synthesizer, vocals (1972–1977, 1990, 2007)
- Gary McCracken – drums, percussion, vocals (1976–1981, 1990, 1995–1996, 2007; died 2026)
- Dave Myles – bass, bass pedals, vocals (1977–1980)
- Paul Kersey – drums, percussion (1973–1976)
- Jim Bruton – keyboards (1973–1974; died 2026)
- Phil Trudell – drums, percussion (1972–1973)
- David Stone – keyboards, synthesizer (1980)
- Mike Gingrich – bass, bass pedals, vocals (1980–1981)
- Steve McMurray – guitar (1980–1981; died 2014)
- Greg Chadd – keyboards, synthesizer (1980)
- Peter Fredette – bass, vocals (1995–1996)
- Billy Sheehan – bass (1977)
- Pye Dubois – lyrics (1973–1981, died 2026)

== Discography ==
=== Studio albums ===
Year	Title	Chart positions	Certifications
Year	Title	CAN	
1976	Max Webster	32	Gold
1977	High Class in Borrowed Shoes	44	Gold
1978	Mutiny Up My Sleeve	53	Gold
1979	A Million Vacations	13	Platinum
1980	Universal Juveniles	41	Gold

A United Kingdom only release called Magnetic Air was released in 1979 by Capitol-EMI Records to showcase the band to a wider audience. It features live tracks from the Live Magnetic Air album as well as songs from the first two albums, Max Webster and High Class in Borrowed Shoes, as they were not released in the UK.

=== Live albums ===
Year	Title	Chart positions	Certifications
Year	Title	CAN	CAN
1979	Live Magnetic Air	17	Gold

=== Compilation albums ===
Year	Title	Chart positions
Year	Title	CAN
1981	Diamonds Diamonds	47
1989	The Best of Max Webster	–

=== Singles ===
List of singles, with selected chart positions and certifications, showing year released and album name
Year	Title	Peak chart positions		Label / Cat. No.	Album
Year	Title	CAN	UK	CAN	Album
1976	"Blowing The Blues Away" b/w "Hangover"	-	-	Taurus TR 006	Max Webster (Taurus TR-101) (rereleased on Anthem ANR-1-1006)
1977	"Words To Words" b/w "In Context Of The Moon"	-	-	Anthem ANS-003	High Class In Borrowed Shoes (Anthem ANR-1-1007)
1977	"Diamonds, Diamonds" b/w "Rain Child"	-	-	Anthem ANS-005	High Class In Borrowed Shoes (Anthem ANR-1-1007)
1979	"Let Go The Line" b/w "Moon Voices"	39	—	Anthem ANS-012	A Million Vacations (Anthem ANR-1-1018)
1979	"A Million Vacations" b/w "Rascal Houdi" (withdrawn)	-	-	Anthem ANS-013 (first pressing)	A Million Vacations (Anthem ANR-1-1018)
1979	"A Million Vacations" b/w "Night Flights"	80	-	Anthem ANS-013 (reissue)	A Million Vacations (Anthem ANR-1-1018)
1979	"Paradise Skies (live)" b/w "Paradise Skies (studio)"	-	-	Anthem ANS-014 promo only	Live Magnetic Air (Anthem ANR-1-1019) A Million Vacations (Anthem ANR-1-1018)
1980	"Paradise Skies (studio)" b/w "In Context Of The Moon (live)"	47	43	Anthem ANS-014 (reissue)	A Million Vacations (Anthem ANR-1-1018) Live Magnetic Air (Anthem ANR-1-1019)
1980	"Blue River Liquor Shine (edit)" b/w "Check"	98	-	Anthem ANS-027	Universal Juveniles (Anthem ANR-1-1027)
1980	"Night Flights (live)" b/w "Hangover (live)"	-	-	Anthem ANS -020	Live Magnetic Air (Anthem ANR-1-1019)
1981	"Hot Spots" (previously unreleased) b/w "Battle Scar" (with Rush)	-	-	Anthem ANS-037	Diamonds Diamonds (Anthem ANR-1-1033) Universal Juveniles (Anthem ANR-!-1027)

=== Boxsets ===
Year	Title	Format
2017	The Party 1976–82	CD/LP
