= Carl Dixon =

Canadian rock singer, keyboard player and guitarist

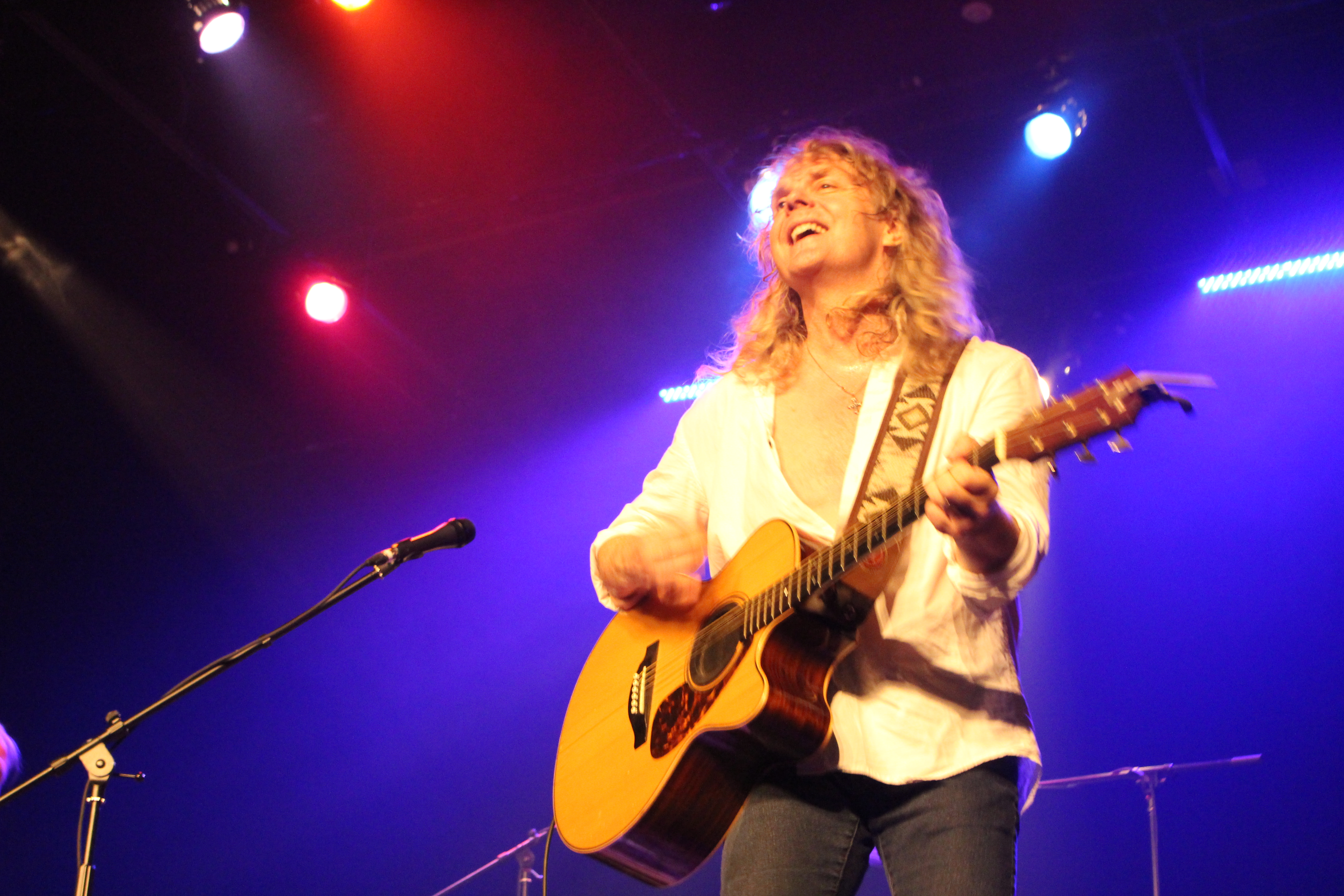
Dixon in 2018

Carleton Anthony "Carl" Dixon is a Canadian rock singer, keyboardist and guitarist. He has been a member of the bands Coney Hatch, April Wine and The Guess Who.

== Early life and education ==
Dixon was born in Sault Ste. Marie, Ontario, and grew up listening to rock music in the 1970s. He graduated from Barrie North Collegiate Institute in 1977.

== Career ==
Dixon moved to Montreal in 1979 to perform with a band called Firefly. In 1981, he left Firefly, moving to Toronto, where he answered an advertisement from the band Coney Hatch, becoming its lead singer. While with Coney Hatch, he wrote and co-wrote many of their hits, such as "Hey Operator" and "Devil's Deck". He spent most of the 1980s touring with Coney Hatch, opening for Iron Maiden's Piece of Mind Tour across North America, and Judas Priest's Screaming for Vengeance Tour 1982. In the 1990s, he pursued his solo career writing for Rondor Publishing (now Universal) and oversaw the production of Coney Hatch's Best Of compilation album.

Throughout his career, Dixon also toured with heavy metal icons such Iron Maiden, Judas Priest, Triumph, Ted Nugent, Accept and Krokus. During his songwriting deal with Rondor Music, he wrote the song "Taste of Love" with Brett Walker for Jimi Jamison. That version was used on an episode of Baywatch titled "Life Guards Can't Jump". In 1989, his demo song "Fool's Paradise" was heard in the 1989 horror film Freakshow. His music was also used in Heaven Before I Die, a feature film with Omar Sharif. "Feel the Feeling Again", written by Dixon, was used on an episode of television series Degrassi High. Dixon toured with April Wine, playing keyboard, guitar and backing vocals from 2001 to 2004. He performed on the April Wine Greatest Hits Live album in 2003.

In 1997, Dixon was invited to join The Guess Who as lead singer. He performed and recorded with the band until spring 2000, and again from early 2004 until 2008. In April 2008, he was critically injured in a car accident in Australia. He remained hospitalised in Melbourne, Australia, for five months. Unable to play and sing, he was replaced in the Guess Who by Derek Sharp. Dixon made a guest appearance with The Guess Who as lead singer for two shows in January 2016 in West Palm Beach, Florida, and Albuquerque, New Mexico.

His youngest daughter, Lauren Dixon, is most publicly known for her role as Stevie Lake on the 2008 series reboot of The Saddle Club. Dixon wrote the song "Just Because" for The Saddle Club season 3 CD "Best Friends".

28 years after the release of its last album, Coney Hatch regrouped, keeping a promise by Andy Curran made to Dixon while he was in his coma, that if he survived they would release a new album. Coney Hatch Four was released by the European label Frontiers Records in 2013 and was voted into the top 50 rock albums of 2013 by the UK's Classic Rock magazine but the album received little airplay in Canada.

Dixon wrote an autobiography about being a singer and musician during the height of Canadian rock, and about redefining his life after the car accident. His book, Strange Way To Live, was published in January 2015 by Dundurn Press and received favourable reviews including from CBC.

Despite ongoing injuries and the effects of severe head trauma, Dixon continues to perform as a musician and singer. Unbroken, his eighth solo album, was released in Europe and Asia by AOR Heaven and Rubicon Music. It was awarded number 22 in the top 30 Rock Albums of 2019 by the Melodic Rock website. Dixon has an increasing presence as an inspirational speaker, sharing his comeback story and music at corporate and safety events. He released an anthology of his works in a 6CD set album Peaced Together in 2026, his ninth solo album. He is signed to Anthem Entertainment, Toronto, and The National Speakers Bureau, Canada.

== Personal ==
Dixon is married to film producer Helen Parker, an Australian.

Preceded by Terry Hatty	Lead singer in The Guess Who	Succeeded by Derek Sharp
