= Gary McCracken =

Canadian musician (1951–2026)

Gary McCracken (19 May 1951 – 17 September 2026) was a Canadian musician. He was the drummer for the band Max Webster from 1976 to 1981, when the band dissolved. As a member of Max Webster, McCracken played on four studio albums and was co-writer and lead vocalist for the band's hit 1979 single, "A Million Vacations". He also collaborated on "Battle Scar" with Rush and drummer Neil Peart in 1980. McCracken has also played with bands including Triumph, Wrabit, Klaatu, and released a solo album, Audioscapes, in 2000.

In 2007, he was voted 32nd on Parade's Top 40 Classic Rock Drummers of All Time.

From his time with Max Webster, McCracken taught music in his hometown of Sarnia, Ontario. He died on 17 September 2026, at the age of 75.
