= Anthem Records =

Canadian record label

- Parent company: Anthem Entertainment (formerly Ole Media Management)
- Founded: 1977
- Founder: Ray Danniels; Vic Wilson
- Distributors: Polydor (May 1977 – March 1978); Capitol-EMI (March 1978 – October 1989); CBS (later Sony) (October 1989 – October 1995); MCA (now Universal) (October 1995 – present)
- Genre: Hard rock, alternative rock
- Country of origin: Canada
- Location: Toronto, Ontario
- Official website: anthem.music

Anthem Records is an independent record label based in Toronto, Ontario, Canada. The company was formed in May 1977 by Ray Danniels and Vic Wilson with initial recording artists Rush, Max Webster, Liverpool and A Foot in Coldwater. The three members of Rush (Geddy Lee, Neil Peart and Alex Lifeson) became associate directors of Anthem.

== Background ==
The label's predecessor was Moon Records. Anthem was formed so that Rush would have more control of their work at home in Canada (their international deal with Mercury Records initially included Canada), and so other Canadian bands would have a home, as they could not get signed by the major labels' offices in Toronto or Montreal. Anthem's sister company is SRO Management. SRO is run by Danniels and Wilson. It oversees flagship act Rush, as well as other bands, on and off Anthem.

Lawrence Gowan had also recorded for the label before joining Styx in 1999.

In November 2015, Anthem was acquired by Ole Media Management. In June 2019, Ole rebranded as Anthem.

== See also ==
- List of record labels
