= Snakes & Arrows Live =

Live album by Rush
- Released: April 14, 2008
- Recorded: October 16–17, 2007
- Venue: Rotterdam Ahoy (Rotterdam, The Netherlands)
- Genre: Progressive rock; hard rock
- Length: 151:42
- Label: Anthem

Rush chronology
Snakes & Arrows (2007)	Snakes & Arrows Live (2008)	Retrospective III: 1989–2008 (2009)

Rush chronology
Rush Replay X 3 (2006)	Snakes & Arrows Live (2008)

Singles from Snakes & Arrows Live
- 1. "Workin' Them Angels (Live)" Released: 2008

Professional ratings
Review scores
Source	Rating
AllMusic	4/5 stars
The Encyclopedia of Popular Music	2/5 stars
PopMatters	8/10 stars
The Rolling Stone Album Guide	2/5 stars

Snakes & Arrows Live is a live double CD and DVD by Canadian band Rush. The CD was released on April 14, 2008, in the UK and on April 15, 2008, around the world. It was also released on DVD and Blu-ray on November 25, 2008. The material was taken from two performances during the first leg of the Snakes & Arrows Tour, recorded at the Ahoy Arena in Rotterdam, Netherlands on October 16 and 17, 2007. The album features nine of its 27 tracks drawn from Snakes & Arrows.

The DVD was compiled from the two Rotterdam performances described above, and also includes supplemental material from the second leg of the tour, recorded at the Verizon Wireless Amphitheatre at Encore Park in Alpharetta, Georgia (metro Atlanta) on July 22, 2008. While the DVD portion is a three-disc set, the Blu-ray version of Snakes & Arrows Live is a single disc. The third DVD includes four songs that were played during the 2008 leg of the tour, replacing "Entre Nous", "Secret Touch", "Circumstances", and "Distant Early Warning" in the set list.

== Track listing ==
All songs written by Geddy Lee, Alex Lifeson, and Neil Peart except where noted.

=== Disc one ===
1. "Limelight" – 4:47
2. "Digital Man" – 6:56
3. "Entre Nous" – 5:18
4. "Mission" – 5:39
5. "Freewill" – 6:01
6. "The Main Monkey Business" (Instrumental) – 6:06
7. "The Larger Bowl" – 4:21
8. "Secret Touch" – 7:45
9. "Circumstances" – 3:46
10. "Between the Wheels" – 6:01
11. "Dreamline" – 5:15
12. "Far Cry" – 5:20
13. "Workin' Them Angels" – 4:48
14. "Armor and Sword" – 6:57

=== Disc two ===
1. "Spindrift" – 5:46
2. "The Way the Wind Blows" – 6:24
3. "Subdivisions" – 5:43
4. "Natural Science" – 8:34
5. "Witch Hunt" – 4:49
6. "Malignant Narcissism" (Lee/Lifeson) – "De Slagwerker (Drum Solo)" (Peart) (instrumental) – 10:41
7. "Hope" (Instrumental; Lifeson) – 2:21
8. "Distant Early Warning" – 4:53
9. "The Spirit of Radio" – 5:03
10. "Tom Sawyer" (Lee/Lifeson/Peart/Pye Dubois) – 5:48
11. "One Little Victory" – 5:26
12. "A Passage to Bangkok" – 3:57
13. "YYZ" (Instrumental; Lee/Peart) – 5:17

== DVD track listing ==
=== Disc 1 (Live in Rotterdam) ===
1. "Limelight" – 4:47
2. "Digital Man" – 6:56
3. "Entre Nous" – 5:18
4. "Mission" – 5:39
5. "Freewill" – 6:01
6. "The Main Monkey Business" (From Snakes & Arrows) – 6:06
7. "The Larger Bowl" (From Snakes & Arrows) – 4:21
8. "Secret Touch" – 7:45
9. "Circumstances" – 3:46
10. "Between the Wheels" – 6:01
11. "Dreamline" – 5:15

==== Extras ====
- Harry Satchel in What's That Smell? (Used as video intro for the second set in the 2008 tour leg)
- 2007 Tour Outtakes
- What's That Smell? Outtakes
- "Far Cry" (Alternate cut featuring rear screen footage)
- "The Way the Wind Blows" (Alternate cut featuring rear screen footage)
- "Red Sector A" (recorded live during the R30: 30th Anniversary Tour) – 5:18

=== Disc two ===
Video intro: The Plane of Dharma (Used before second set during 2007 tour leg)

1. "Far Cry" (From Snakes & Arrows) – 5:20
2. "Workin' Them Angels" (From Snakes & Arrows) – 4:48
3. "Armor and Sword" (From Snakes & Arrows) – 6:57
4. "Spindrift" (From Snakes & Arrows) – 5:46
5. "The Way the Wind Blows" (From Snakes & Arrows) – 6:24
6. "Subdivisions" – 5:43
7. "Natural Science" – 8:34
8. "Witch Hunt" – 4:49
9. "Malignant Narcissism" (From Snakes & Arrows) – "De Slagwerker (Drum Solo)" – 10:41
10. "Hope" (From Snakes & Arrows) – 2:21
11. "Distant Early Warning" – 4:53
12. "The Spirit of Radio" – 5:03
13. "Tom Sawyer" – 5:48
14. "One Little Victory" – 5:26
15. "A Passage to Bangkok" – 3:57
16. "YYZ" – 5:17

=== Disc three (Bonus material) ===
==== Oh, Atlanta (The Authorized Bootlegs) ====
1. "Ghost of a Chance" – 5:50
2. "Red Barchetta" – 7:25
3. "The Trees" – 5:57
4. "2112 Overture/The Temples of Syrinx" – 7:00

== Personnel ==
- Geddy Lee – bass, synthesizers, vocals
- Alex Lifeson – electric and acoustic guitars, bass pedal synth
- Neil Peart – drums, percussion

== Charts ==
Audio

Chart (2008)	Peak position
Canadian Albums (Billboard)	8
Dutch Albums (Album Top 100)	36
German Albums (Offizielle Top 100)	63
Swedish Albums (Sverigetopplistan)	42
UK Albums (OCC)	70
US Billboard 200	18
US Top Hard Rock Albums (Billboard)	5
US Top Rock Albums (Billboard)	1
US Indie Store Album Sales (Billboard)	12

== Certifications ==
DVD

Region	Certification	Certified units/sales
Canada (Music Canada)	5× Platinum	50,000^{^}
United States (RIAA)	2× Platinum	200,000^{^}
^{^} Shipments figures based on certification alone.
