= Snakes & Arrows Tour =

2007–2008 concert tour by Rush

- World tour by Rush
- Promotional poster for the tour
- Location: Europe; North America
- Associated album: Snakes & Arrows
- Start date: June 13, 2007
- End date: July 24, 2008
- Legs: 3
- No. of shows: 114

Rush concert chronology
- R30: 30th Anniversary World Tour (2004); Snakes & Arrows Tour (2007–08); Time Machine Tour (2010–11)

The Snakes & Arrows Tour was a concert tour by Canadian rock band Rush to promote the studio album Snakes & Arrows. The first leg of the tour began on June 13, 2007, in Atlanta and concluded on October 29, 2007, at Hartwall Arena in Helsinki, Finland. The 2008 portion of the tour started on April 11, 2008, in San Juan, Puerto Rico at José Miguel Agrelot Coliseum and ended on July 24, 2008, in Noblesville, Indiana at the Verizon Wireless Amphitheatre. The tour was Rush's most successful to date, grossing nearly $65 million. At 114 shows, it is Rush's second-longest tour, after the Hemispheres tour back in 1978 –79.

Rush released the double live album Snakes & Arrows Live on April 15, 2008, documenting the 2007 leg. It contains the entire 2007 setlist recorded over two days, October 16–17, in Rotterdam, Netherlands. The album features the song "Distant Early Warning" in place of "Summertime Blues".

During this tour, Rush once again used their connections to add humor to their performances. "The Larger Bowl (A Pantoum)" featured an intro from SCTV's own Bob and Doug McKenzie, while "Tom Sawyer" was preceded by an intro from South Park characters Cartman, Stan, Kyle, and Kenny.

== Performance changes ==
This tour differed from previous Rush tours in an increase of new material played (nine songs compared to the more usual four or five) and the reintroduction of songs that have not been played for decades (for example "Circumstances", last played when the band was touring for 1978's Hemispheres, and "A Passage to Bangkok", which was last played in its entirety on the Moving Pictures Warm-Up tour and included as a cut on 1981's double-live album Exit... Stage Left). The first leg also marked the first time "Entre Nous" from Permanent Waves was performed live. Some of the older songs (e.g. "Digital Man" from Signals) were shortened.

Neil Peart's drum solo underwent changes. The big band ending, which on previous tours featured Peart's performance of "One O'Clock Jump" by Count Basie, instead incorporated a portion of "Cotton Tail", a song he recorded with the Buddy Rich Band on the tribute Burning For Buddy, Vol. 1. The marimba section from "Pieces of Eight" and the tribal excerpt piece from "Scars" were also dropped.

== 2007 leg setlist ==
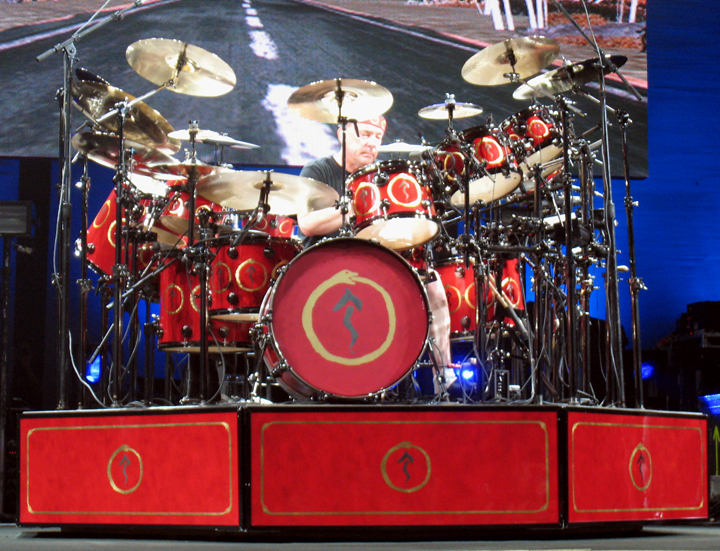
Neil Peart and his custom Snakes & Arrows drums

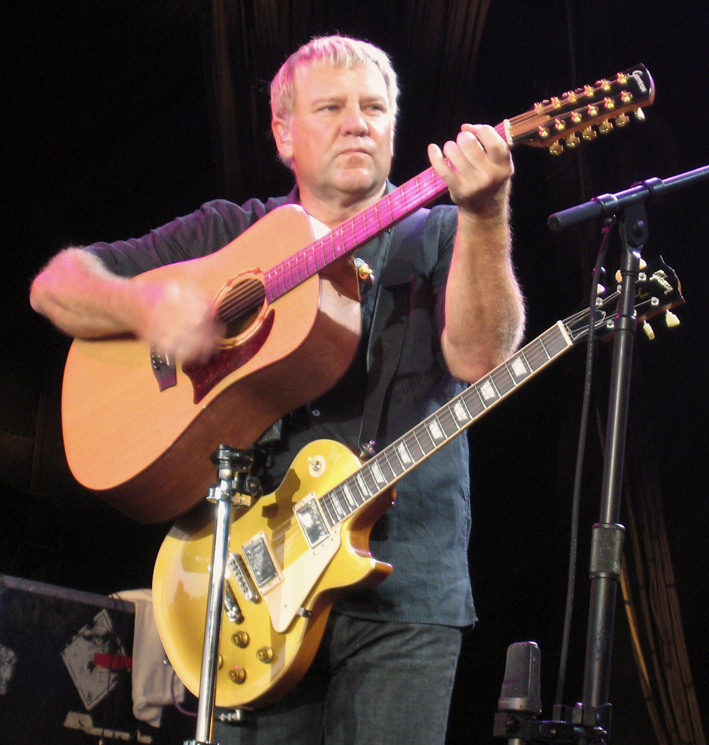
Alex Lifeson playing his Garrison GD25-12 guitar

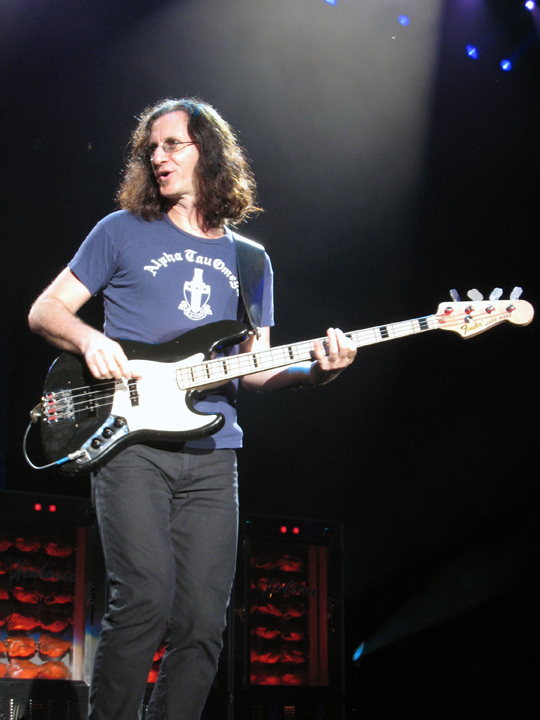
Geddy Lee playing his signature Fender Jazz Bass

=== Set 1 ===
1. "Limelight"
2. "Digital Man"
3. "Entre Nous"
4. "Mission"
5. "Freewill"
6. "The Main Monkey Business"
7. "The Larger Bowl (A Pantoum)"
8. "Secret Touch"
9. "Circumstances"
10. "Between the Wheels"
11. "Dreamline"

Set 2

1. "Far Cry"
2. "Workin' Them Angels"
3. "Armor and Sword"
4. "Spindrift"
5. "The Way the Wind Blows"
6. "Subdivisions"
7. "Natural Science"
8. "Witch Hunt"
9. "Malignant Narcissism"
10. "De Slagwerker" (Neil Peart drum solo)
11. "Hope"
12. "Summertime Blues" or "Distant Early Warning" (alternated starting on July 4, 2007, and permanently added to the setlist for the entire European leg)
13. "The Spirit of Radio"
14. "Tom Sawyer"

Encore:

1. "One Little Victory"
2. "A Passage to Bangkok"
3. "YYZ"

== 2008 leg setlist ==
=== Set 1 ===
1. "Limelight"
2. "Digital Man"
3. "Ghost of a Chance"
4. "Mission"
5. "Freewill"
6. "The Main Monkey Business"
7. "The Larger Bowl (A Pantoum)"
8. "Red Barchetta"
9. "The Trees"
10. "Between the Wheels"
11. "Dreamline"

Set 2:

1. "Far Cry"
2. "Workin' Them Angels"
3. "Armor and Sword"
4. "Spindrift"
5. "The Way the Wind Blows"
6. "Subdivisions"
7. "Natural Science"
8. "Witch Hunt"
9. "Malignant Narcissism"
10. "De Slagwerker" (Neil Peart drum solo)
11. "Hope"
12. "The Spirit of Radio"
13. "2112"
  I."Overture"
  II."The Temples of Syrinx"
14. "Tom Sawyer"

Encore:

1. "One Little Victory"
2. "A Passage to Bangkok"
3. "YYZ"

== Tour dates ==
List of 2007 concerts
Date	City	Country	Venue	Capacity/Attendance/Gross
June 13, 2007	Atlanta	United States	HiFi Buys Amphitheatre	15,949 / 8,998 / $505,255
June 15, 2007	West Palm Beach	United States	Sound Advice Amphitheater	19,238 / 9,432 / $492,908
June 16, 2007	Tampa	United States	Ford Amphitheater	19,508 / 13,434 / $605,896
June 18, 2007	Charlotte	United States	Verizon Wireless Amphitheatre	18,700 / 8,287 / $408,908
June 20, 2007	Raleigh	United States	Walnut Creek Amphitheater	20,036 / 8,085 / $348,592
June 22, 2007	Virginia Beach	United States	Verizon Wireless Amphitheatre	??? / ??? / ???
June 23, 2007	Bristow	United States	Nissan Pavilion	22,661 / 12,203 / $708,378
June 25, 2007	Burgettstown	United States	Post-Gazette Pavilion	23,070 / 9,257 / $380,157
June 27, 2007	Mansfield	United States	Tweeter Center	14,245 / 12,358 / $689,995
June 29, 2007	Scranton	United States	Toyota Pavilion at Montage Mountain	17,161 / 8,482 / $405,990
June 30, 2007	Saratoga Springs	United States	SPAC	25,240 / 10,847 / $525,626
July 2, 2007	Wantagh	United States	Nikon at Jones Beach Theater	13,851 / 12,300 / $860,671
July 4, 2007	Corfu	United States	Darien Lake Performing Arts Center	21,800 / 7,624 / $429,109
July 6, 2007	Camden	United States	Tweeter Center	24,956 / 12,180 / $662,267
July 8, 2007	Holmdel	United States	PNC Bank Arts Center	16,996 / 12,014 / $628,792
July 9, 2007	Uncasville	United States	Mohegan Sun Arena	7,793 / 7,793 / $452,900
July 18, 2007	Calgary	Canada	Pengrowth Saddledome	12,026 / 11,006 / $808,041
July 20, 2007	Auburn	United States	White River Amphitheatre	15,552 / 13,689 / $638,462
July 21, 2007	Ridgefield	United States	The Amphitheater at Clark County	13,188 / 10,986 / $581,898
July 23, 2007	Hollywood	United States	Hollywood Bowl	17,563 / 14,696 / $1,074,586
July 25, 2007	Irvine	United States	Verizon Wireless Amphitheater	11,563 / 10,347 / $682,819
July 27, 2007	Phoenix	United States	Cricket Wireless Pavilion	16,066 / 12,276 / $485,795
July 28, 2007	Paradise	United States	MGM Grand Garden Arena	11,034 / 10,002 / $922,675
July 30, 2007	Chula Vista	United States	Coors Amphitheater	9,831 / 8,959 / $412,235
August 1, 2007	Mountain View	United States	Shoreline Amphitheatre	11,000 / 9,101 / $507,546
August 3, 2007	Concord	United States	Sleep Train Pavilion	10,916 / 9,775 / $529,150
August 4, 2007	Wheatland	United States	Sleep Train Amphitheatre	9,000 / 8,428 / $409,880
August 6, 2007	West Valley City	United States	USANA Amphitheatre	14,500 / 10,971 / $492,950
August 8, 2007	Morrison	United States	Red Rocks Amphitheatre	8,753 / 8,753 / $674,504
August 11, 2007	Dallas	United States	Smirnoff Music Centre	16,500 / 13,366 / $690,086
August 12, 2007	Selma	United States	Verizon Wireless Amphitheater	15,155 / 11,469 / $527,568
August 14, 2007	The Woodlands	United States	Cynthia Woods Mitchell Pavilion	14,490 / 11,904 / $646,748
August 23, 2007	Bonner Springs	United States	Verizon Wireless Amphitheatre	12,500 / 8,104 / $406,416
August 24, 2007	Maryland Heights	United States	Verizon Wireless Amphitheater	16,500 / 12,135 / $490,721
August 26, 2007	Noblesville	United States	Verizon Wireless Music Center	12,500 / 9,599 / $424,449
August 28, 2007	Clarkston	United States	DTE Energy Music Theatre	13,213 / 11,384 / $602,300
August 30, 2007	Cuyahoga Falls	United States	Blossom Music Center	13,491 / 10,527 / $449,578
September 1, 2007	Cincinnati	United States	Riverbend Music Center	16,435 / 10,776 / $479,040
September 2, 2007	Columbus	United States	Germain Amphitheater	12,891 / 10,241 / $463,661
September 6, 2007	Milwaukee	United States	Marcus Amphitheater	13,299 / 12,100 / $516,155
September 8, 2007	Tinley Park	United States	First Midwest Bank Amphitheatre	18,174 / 16,613 / $847,695
September 9, 2007	Saint Paul	United States	Xcel Energy Center	14,956 / 11,402 / $752,618
September 12, 2007	London	Canada	John Labatt Centre	8,936 / 8,608 / $627,749
September 14, 2007	Quebec City	Canada	Colisée de Québec	7,000 / 6,604 / $489,689
September 15, 2007	Montreal	Canada	Bell Centre	12,000 / 11,662 / $967,692
September 17, 2007	New York City	United States	Madison Square Garden	12,125 / 11,786 / $1,022,675
September 19, 2007	Toronto	Canada	Air Canada Centre	11,950 / 11,950 / $605,304
September 21, 2007	Ottawa	Canada	Scotiabank Place	16,500 / 10,870 / $594,490
September 22, 2007	Toronto	Canada	Air Canada Centre	11,950 / 10,304 / $592,306
October 3, 2007	Glasgow	Scotland	SECC	9000 / 7,820 / $485,330
October 5, 2007	Newcastle	England	Metro Radio Arena	9000 / 6,989 / $427,560
October 6, 2007	Sheffield	England	Hallam FM Arena	11,000 / 10,102 / $455,403
October 9, 2007	London	England	Wembley Arena	9,890 / 9,890 / $710,000
October 10, 2007	London	England	Wembley Arena	9,890 / 9,130 / $687,330
October 12, 2007	Birmingham	England	NEC Arena	12,643 / 12,643 / $875,300
October 14, 2007	Manchester	England	MEN Arena	15,552 / 15,552 / $977,290
October 16, 2007	Rotterdam	Netherlands	Ahoy	5,800 / 5,800 / $377,000
October 17, 2007	Rotterdam	Netherlands	Ahoy	5,800 / 5,800 / $377,000
October 19, 2007	Oberhausen	Germany	König Pilsener Arena	10,000 / 6,550 / $398,995
October 21, 2007	Mannheim	Germany	SAP Arena	12,500 / 9,170 / $567,540
October 23, 2007	Milan	Italy	Forum Arena	9,000 / 5,020 / $362,020
October 26, 2007	Oslo	Norway	Spektrum	7,300 / 7,300 / 458,000
October 27, 2007	Stockholm	Sweden	Globen Arena	12,000 / 10,886 / $496,405
October 29, 2007	Helsinki	Finland	Hartwall Arena	11,200 / 11,200 / $577,347

List of 2008 concerts
Date	City	Country	Venue	Capacity/Attendance/Gross
April 11, 2008	San Juan	Puerto Rico	Coliseo de Puerto Rico	9,598 / 6,855 / $740,155
April 13, 2008	Fort Lauderdale	United States	BankAtlantic Center	8,432 / 8,432 / $568,067
April 15, 2008	Orlando	United States	Amway Arena	8,517 / 7,612 / $513,348
April 17, 2008	Jacksonville	United States	Jacksonville Veterans Memorial Arena	12,234 / 6,271 / $341,025
April 19, 2008	The Woodlands	United States	Cynthia Woods Mitchell Pavilion	11,033 / 7,653 / $507,265
April 20, 2008	New Orleans	United States	New Orleans Arena	12,987 / 10,529 / $663,000
April 23, 2008	Austin	United States	Frank Erwin Center	7,836 / 7,049 / $417,260
April 25, 2008	Dallas	United States	Gexa Energy Pavilion	11,500 / 8,496 / $546,048
April 26, 2008	Oklahoma City	United States	Ford Center	8,497 / 7,953 / $477,831
April 29, 2008	Albuquerque	United States	Journal Pavilion	11,496 / 7,653 / $345,952
May 1, 2008	Phoenix	United States	Cricket Wireless Pavilion	12,000 / 8,531 / $420,818
May 3, 2008	Reno	United States	Reno Events Center	6,114 / 6,114 / $468,486
May 4, 2008	Concord	United States	Sleep Train Pavilion	11,500 / 9,451 / $469,767
May 6, 2008	Los Angeles	United States	Nokia Theater	6,308 / 4,930 / $592,788
May 8, 2008	Los Angeles	United States	Nokia Theater	6,308 / 4,930 / $592,788
May 10, 2008	Paradise	United States	Mandalay Bay Events Center	8,449 / 7,762 / $680,901
May 11, 2008	Irvine	United States	Verizon Wireless Amphitheater	12,298 / 9,488 / $615,582
May 20, 2008	Moline	United States	iWireless Center	6,526 / 5,789 / $298,153
May 22, 2008	Saint Paul	United States	Xcel Energy Center	12,440 / 7,901 / $494,340
May 24, 2008	Winnipeg	Canada	MTS Centre	10,333 / 7,802 / $419,459
May 25, 2008	Regina	Canada	Brandt Centre	6,186 / 5,548 / $375,778
May 27, 2008	Edmonton	Canada	Rexall Place	11,250 / 8,779 / $496,569
May 29, 2008	Vancouver	Canada	GM Place	14,000 / 10,150 / $589,540
May 31, 2008	George	United States	The Gorge	14,482 / 10,450 / $638,211
June 1, 2008	Ridgefield	United States	The Amphitheater at Clark County	10,790 / 8,157 / $449,155
June 3, 2008	Nampa	United States	Idaho Center	6,160 / 5,568 / $330,479
June 5, 2008	Morrison	United States	Red Rocks Amphitheatre	Postponed to June 25, 2008, due to severe weather
June 7, 2008	Kansas City	United States	Starlight Theater	7,733 / 6,339 / $373,564
June 9, 2008	Chicago	United States	United Center	10,863 / 10,600 / $802,843
June 10, 2008	Detroit	United States	Joe Louis Arena	13,835 / 8,744 / 571,309
June 12, 2008	Montreal	Canada	Bell Centre	9,468 / 7,575 / $655,450
June 14, 2008	Philadelphia	United States	Wachovia Center	12,017 / 9,801 / $662,621
June 15, 2008	Mansfield	United States	Comcast Center	10,734 / 8,263 / $617,859
June 25, 2008	Morrison	United States	Red Rocks Amphitheatre	8,412 / 8,412 / $672,514
June 27, 2008	Milwaukee	United States	Marcus Amphitheater	25,000 / 11,272 / $787,005
June 28, 2008	Maryland Heights	United States	Verizon Wireless Amphitheater	12,000 / 9,744 / $443,455
June 30, 2008	Cincinnati	United States	Riverbend Music Center	10,000 / 7,894 / $419,600
July 2, 2008	Burgettstown	United States	Post-Gazette Pavilion	12,500 / 8,190 / $329,076
July 4, 2008	Atlantic City	United States	Mark Etess Arena	5,256 / 4,327 / $365,252
July 5, 2008	Saratoga Springs	United States	SPAC	13,633 / 9,202 / $490,540
July 7, 2008	Uncasville	United States	Mohegan Sun Arena	7,514 / 6,619 / $455,230
July 9, 2008	Toronto	Canada	Molson Amphitheatre	15,949 / 15,949 / 900,480
July 11, 2008	Manchester	United States	Verizon Wireless Arena	8,679 / 7,989 / $496,740
July 12, 2008	Holmdel	United States	PNC Bank Arts Center	12,700 / 9,641 / $638,247
July 14, 2008	Wantagh	United States	Nikon at Jones Beach Theater	10,829 / 9,070 / $733,035
July 17, 2008	Hershey	United States	Hersheypark Stadium	13,153 / 9,597 / $631,050
July 19, 2008	Bristow	United States	Nissan Pavilion	14,500 / 10,784 / $684,385
July 20, 2008	Charlotte	United States	Verizon Wireless Amphitheater	12,517 / 8,997 / $399,279
July 22, 2008	Alpharetta	United States	Verizon Wireless Amphitheatre at Encore Park	12,000 / 10,559 / $701,025
July 24, 2008	Noblesville	United States	Verizon Wireless Music Center	24,000 / 9,987 / $445,652
