= List of songs recorded by Rush =

This is a comprehensive list of compositions performed or recorded by the Canadian rock band Rush or its principal members Alex Lifeson, Geddy Lee, and Neil Peart, including contributions made to other artists.

== List ==
Song	Album	Year	Notes	Ref.
"Losing Again"	Unreleased song	1969	Played by the band as early as February 1969; their first original tune.	
"You Don't Love Me"	Unreleased song	1969	Played by the band as early as February 1969; a cover of a John Mayall's Bluesbreakers tune (remake of Willie Cobbs original) that featured then-keyboardist (and future brother-in-law of Geddy Lee) Lindy Young singing lead vocals.	
"Living Loving Maid"	Unreleased song	1969	Played by the band as early as November 1969; a cover of the Led Zeppelin tune from the Led Zeppelin II album. Geddy Lee states the song was in Rush's setlist for a while during their early bar playing days, being one of the few Led Zeppelin tunes they attempted that wasn't too difficult for them to play at the time.	
"Child Reborn"	Unreleased song	1969	Played by the band as early as November 1969; an original notable for its multiple time changes that seemed to guarantee a hostile reaction at high school dances.	
"Feel So Good"	Unreleased song	1970	Played by the band as early as September 1970.	
"Keep in Line"	Unreleased song	1970	Played by the band as early as September 1970.	
"Love Light"	Unreleased song	1970	Played by the band as early as September 1970.	
"Marguerite"	Unreleased song	1970	Played by the band as early as September 1970.	
"Mike's Idea"	Unreleased song	1970	Played by the band as early as September 1970.	
"Morning Star"	Unreleased song	1970	Played by the band as early as September 1970.	
"Number One"	Unreleased song	1970	Played by the band as early as September 1970.	
"Run Willie Run"	Unreleased song	1970	Played by the band as early as September 1970. Southern R&B song about a young guy who's running from the law.	
"Sing Guitar"	Unreleased song	1970	Played by the band as early as September 1970.	
"Slaughterhouse"	Unreleased song	1970	Played by the band as early as September 1970.	
"Tale"	Unreleased song	1970	Played by the band as early as September 1970.	
"Not Fade Away"	Non-album single	1973	Drummer: John Rutsey; First single released; Buddy Holly cover; Lifeson states the band used to play a really heavy version of this song during their early bar years, but toned it down a lot when this 1973 single was recorded for better commercial appeal. Originally planned for inclusion on Rush's debut album, but scrapped in the end. The song has not been released in any format since the initial 1973 Moon Records release until 2025, when it was included on the band's 50th anniversary box set. Allegedly, only 500 copies of the single were pressed.	
"You Can't Fight It"	Non-album single	1973	Drummer: John Rutsey; First original song released; B Side of Not Fade Away single; Music: Geddy Lee; Lyrics: John Rutsey; Played by the band as early as 1971. Originally planned for inclusion on Rush's debut album, but scrapped in the end. The song has not been released in any format since the initial 1973 Moon Records release until 2025, when it was included on the band's 50th anniversary box set. Allegedly, only 500 copies of the single were pressed.	
"Finding My Way"	Rush	1974	Drummer: John Rutsey	
"Need Some Love"	Rush	1974	Drummer: John Rutsey	
"Take a Friend"	Rush	1974	Drummer: John Rutsey	
"Here Again"	Rush	1974	Drummer: John Rutsey; Lyrics: Alex Lifeson	
"What You're Doing"	Rush	1974	Drummer: John Rutsey	
"In the Mood"	Rush	1974	Drummer: John Rutsey	
"Before and After"	Rush	1974	The band's first-ever suite, being of "Before" and "After", initially named "Before/After" on Lee's handwritten lyrics sheet; Drummer: John Rutsey	
"Working Man"	Rush	1974	Drummer: John Rutsey; First song with US radio play (WMMS radio in Cleveland, Ohio)	
"I've Been Runnin’"	R40 DVD / BD Box Set	1974	Drummer: John Rutsey; Previously unreleased early song, featured as bonus material on the 2014 compilation R40. Disk 6 Bonus Disk. Filmed during Spring 1974 at the Laura Secord Secondary School in St. Catharines, Ontario.	
"The Loser"	R40 DVD / BD Box Set	1974	Drummer: John Rutsey; Previously unreleased early song, featured as bonus material on the 2014 compilation R40. Disk 6 bonus disk. Filmed during Spring 1974 at the Laura Secord Secondary School in St. Catharines, Ontario.	
"Fancy Dancer"	Semi-official / RoIO releases	1974	Semi-officially released in 2011 as ABC 1974 - The First American Broadcast; circulated as bootleg releases since the year 2000; Recorded on 26 August 1974 at the Agora Ballroom in Cleveland, Ohio. Occasionally played during their debut album tour of 1974. Originally planned for inclusion on Fly by Night, but ultimately scrapped. About a love gone bad.	
"Bad Boy"	Semi-official / RoIO releases	1974	Semi-officially released in 2011 as ABC 1974 - The First American Broadcast; circulated as bootleg releases since the year 2000; Recorded on 26 August 1974 at the Agora Ballroom in Cleveland, Ohio. Regularly played by the band during their debut album tour of 1974, and occasionally during the Fly By Night tour of 1975. Larry Williams cover.	
"Garden Road"	Semi-official / RoIO releases	1974	Semi-officially released in 2011 as ABC 1974 - The First American Broadcast; circulated as bootleg releases since the year 2000; recorded on 26 August 1974 at the Agora Ballroom in Cleveland, Ohio. Played by band as early as 1970; Excerpt played at the very end of "Working Man" during the R40 Tour in 2015. Alludes to finding happiness with an early love.	
"Anthem"	Fly by Night	1975	"...the name of our record company, which is Anthem Records in Canada, came from this song. Neil was in an Ayn Rand period, so he wrote the song about being very individual. We thought we were doing something that was different from everybody else." ~ Alex Lifeson	
"Best I Can"	Fly by Night	1975	Played by band as early as 1974, prior to Peart being a member, although Peart is the drummer on the studio release.	
"Beneath, Between, and Behind"	Fly by Night	1975	First song co-written by Geddy Lee, Alex Lifeson, and Neil Peart	
"By-Tor and the Snow Dog"	Fly by Night	1975	The band's first fantasy and science fiction epic track; I. At the Tobes of Hades; II. Across the Styx; III. Of the Battle (a. Challenge and Defiance, b. 7/4 War Furor, c. Aftermath, d. Hymn of Triumph); IV. Epilogue	
"Fly by Night"	Fly By Night	1975	Considered the most pop-like piece on the album	
"Making Memories"	Fly by Night	1975	Written on the road where the band got lost somewhere around Indiana.	
"Rivendell"	Fly by Night	1975	Inspired by Rivendell, a fictional realm created by author J.R.R. Tolkien	
"In the End"	Fly by Night	1975	A song about coming home after being on the road	
"Bastille Day"	Caress of Steel	1975	Inspired by the storming of the Bastille in French history.	
"I Think I'm Going Bald"	Caress of Steel	1975	Discusses aging. Peart chose the title of the track based on Lifeson always being worried about his potential hair loss.	
"Lakeside Park"	Caress of Steel	1975	Inspired by an amusement park in Port Dalhousie, Ontario	
"The Necromancer"	Caress of Steel	1975	I. Into the Darkness; II. Under the Shadow; III. Return of the Prince; Inspired by the fictional character Sauron from The Hobbit by J.R.R. Tolkien	
"The Fountain of Lamneth"	Caress of Steel	1975	I. In the Valley; II. Didacts and Narpets; III. No One at the Bridge; IV. Panacea; V. Bacchus Plateau; VI. The Fountain	
"2112"	2112	1976	I. "Overture"; II. "The Temples of Syrinx"; III. "Discovery"; IV. "Presentation"; V. "Oracle: The Dream"; VI. "Soliloquy"; VII. “Grand Finale"	
"A Passage to Bangkok"	2112	1976	Inspired by A Passage to India by E. M. Forster, the song describes a dreamlike journey around the world in search of marijuana fields, with an allusion to Acapulco Gold.	
"The Twilight Zone"	2112	1976	Inspired by The Twilight Zone television anthology series written and hosted by Rod Serling.	
"Lessons"	2112	1976	Lifeson has sole songwriting credit which is rare for the band.	
"Tears"	2112	1976	Keyboards: Hugh Syme; Lyrics: Geddy Lee	
"Something for Nothing"	2112	1976	Inspired by writing found on a building near Shrine Auditorium in Los Angeles, California that read: "Freedom isn’t free".	
"A Farewell to Kings"	A Farewell to Kings	1977	Title adapted from Ernest Hemingway’s novel A Farewell to Arms.	
"Xanadu"	A Farewell to Kings	1977	Inspired by the poem Kubla Khan written by Samuel Taylor Coleridge	
"Closer to the Heart"	A Farewell to Kings	1977	Lyrics co-written by Peart and Peter Talbot	
"Cinderella Man"	A Farewell to Kings	1977	Inspired by Mr. Deeds Goes to Town.	
"Madrigal"	A Farewell to Kings	1977	A madrigal is a secular vocal music composition	
"Cygnus X-1 Book I: The Voyage"	A Farewell to Kings	1977	Inspired by a Time Magazine article on black holes.	
"Cygnus X-1 Book II: Hemispheres"	Hemispheres	1978	I. "Prelude"; II. "Apollo: Bringer of Wisdom"; III. "Dionysus: Bringer of Love"; IV. "Armageddon: The Battle of Heart and Mind"; V. "Cygnus: Bringer of Balance"; VI. "The Sphere: A Kind of Dream"	
"Circumstances"	Hemispheres	1978	Written by Peart about his experience on his own at 18 years old in England.	
"The Trees"	Hemispheres	1978	Inspired by Dr. Seuss’s The Lorax.	
"La Villa Strangiato"	Hemispheres	1978	I. Buenos Nochus, Mein Froinds!; II. To sleep, perchance to dream...; III. Strangiato theme; IV. A Lerxst in Wonderland; V. Monsters!; VI. The Ghost of the Aragon; VII. Danforth and Pape; VIII. The Waltz of the Shreves; IX. Never turn your back on a Monster!; X. Monsters! (Reprise); XI. Strangiato theme (Reprise); XII. A Farewell to Things. An instrumental based on dreams of Lifeson	
"Sir Gawain and the Green Knight"	Unreleased song	1979	Written for Permanent Waves, but ultimately scrapped at the last minute after all tracks were already completed. Loosely reworked into "Natural Science". Inspired by the 14th-century Arthurian poem Sir Gawain and the Green Knight. Peart's original handwritten lyric sheet survives.	
"The Spirit of Radio"	Permanent Waves	1980	Inspired by a slogan of Toronto radio station CFNY, which was the first station to play a Rush song over the air.	
"Freewill"	Permanent Waves	1980	"[Musically], the song is a new thing for us in terms of time signatures. [The piece is mostly in 13/4.] We experiment a lot with time signatures. We work in nearly every one of them that I know of that's legitimate: all of the 5s, 7s, 9s, 11s, 13s, and combinations thereof." ~ Neil Peart	
"Jacob's Ladder"	Permanent Waves	1980	Inspired by crepuscular rays, also known as Jacob's ladder.	
"Entre Nous"	Permanent Waves	1980	French expression translated as "between us"	
"Different Strings"	Permanent Waves	1980	Piano: Hugh Syme	
"Natural Science"	Permanent Waves	1980	I. Tide Pools; II. Hyperspace; III. Permanent Waves	
"Tom Sawyer"	Moving Pictures	1981	Co-written by Pye Dubois. Inspired by the fictional character Tom Sawyer created by Mark Twain; The quintessential Rush song.	
"Red Barchetta"	Moving Pictures	1981	Inspired by 'A Nice Morning Drive', by Richard S. Foster	
"YYZ"	Moving Pictures	1981	Inspired by the International Air Transport Association airport code for the Toronto Pearson International Airport; Pronounced Y-Y-Zed.	
"Limelight"	Moving Pictures	1981	Inspired by the experience of being a touring musician.	
"The Camera Eye"	Moving Pictures	1981	Comprises two movements, focusing on New York City and London, respectively.	
"Witch Hunt"	Moving Pictures	1981	Fear: Part III	
"Vital Signs"	Moving Pictures	1981	I. "+ [Plus]"; II. "÷ [Divided By]"; III. "="; IV. "− [Minus]"; V. "× [Multiplied By]"; VII. "="; Inspired by the language of electronics and computers.	
"Broon's Bane"	Exit...Stage Left	1981	Guitar solo; Named after long-time producer Terry Brown whom the band had nicknamed "Broon".	
"Subdivisions"	Signals	1982	About growing up in the suburbs.	
"The Analog Kid"	Signals	1982	About growing up in the age of analog.	
"Chemistry"	Signals	1982	First time all three of members of the band collaborated on the lyrics.	
"Digital Man"	Signals	1982	"The digital man character was running in the fast lane, faster than life." ~ Neil Peart	
"The Weapon"	Signals	1982	Fear: Part II	
"New World Man"	Signals	1982	Billboard Hot 100 highest-charting single for the band (#21; 30 Oct 1982)	
"Losing It"	Signals	1982	Electric Violins: Ben Mink	
"Countdown"	Signals	1982	Inspired by the STS-1 Space Shuttle flight.	
"Distant Early Warning"	Grace Under Pressure	1984	Title refers to the systems that are part of the North American Aerospace Defense Command.	
"Afterimage"	Grace Under Pressure	1984	In memory of Robbie Whelan (a friend of the band) who died in a car accident near the studio where the band recorded the album.	
"Red Sector A"	Grace Under Pressure	1984	Addresses imprisonment in Nazi concentration camps.	
"The Enemy Within"	Grace Under Pressure	1984	Fear: Part I	
"The Body Electric"	Grace Under Pressure	1984	Title derived from the poem I Sing the Body Electric by Walt Whitman and a novel of the same name by Ray Bradbury.	
"Kid Gloves"	Grace Under Pressure	1984	"1983 was a tough year for us. The last tour was a grind, and everybody had been going through some changes. Before Peter [Henderson, the producer of Grace Under Pressure] we had a couple of other people in mind we wanted to work with [namely, Steve Lillywhite, producer of U2], but things got screwed up along the way and there was a bit of a panic. ‘Kid Gloves’ is our response to rolling with the punches during pressure." ~ Alex Lifeson	
"Red Lenses"	Grace Under Pressure	1984	Song that uses alliteration regarding the word "red".	
"Between the Wheels"	Grace Under Pressure	1984	"The idea of ‘Between the Wheels’ was really kind of the opposite of ‘Digital Man,’ where life goes faster than a person does." ~ Neil Peart	
"The Big Money"	Power Windows	1985	Inspired by the U.S.A. trilogy book The Big Money written by John Dos Passos.	
"Grand Designs"	Power Windows	1985	Inspired by the District of Columbia trilogy book The Grand Design written by John Dos Passos.	
"Manhattan Project"	Power Windows	1985	Inspired by the Manhattan Project research and development project which produced the first atomic bombs.	
"Marathon"	Power Windows	1985	"The song ‘is about the triumph of time and a kind of message to myself, because I think life is too short for all the things that I want to do. There's a self-admonition saying that life is long enough. You can do a lot, just don't burn yourself out too fast trying to do everything at once. ‘Marathon’ is a song about individual goals and trying to achieve them. And it's also about the old Chinese proverb: ‘The journey of a thousand miles begins with one step.'" ~ Neil Peart	
"Territories"	Power Windows	1985	Inspired by New Territories in Hong Kong.	
"Middletown Dreams"	Power Windows	1985	Inspired by writer Sherwood Anderson and painter Paul Gauguin.	
"Emotion Detector"	Power Windows	1985	Originally intended to be a ballad.	
"Mystic Rhythms"	Power Windows	1985	Inspired by astrology.	
"Force Ten"	Hold Your Fire	1987	Co-written by Pye Dubois. Inspired by the Beaufort scale wind speed rating.	
"Time Stand Still"	Hold Your Fire	1987	Vocals (additional): Aimee Mann	
"Open Secrets"	Hold Your Fire	1987	The lyric ‘That's not what I meant at all’ is from the T.S. Eliot poem, The Love Song of J. Alfred Prufrock.	
"Second Nature"	Hold Your Fire	1987	Articulates a moderating of Peart's environmental goals over time (according to his book Roadshow).	
"Prime Mover"	Hold Your Fire	1987	Inspired by Aristotle and Plato.	
"Lock and Key"	Hold Your Fire	1987	Inspired by the killer instinct found in humanity.	
"Mission"	Hold Your Fire	1987	Inspired by the struggles of Vincent van Gogh, Virginia Woolf, and F. Scott Fitzgerald.	
"Turn the Page"	Hold Your Fire	1987	"I had a major problem with playing ‘Turn the Page’ live on tour. It's a very busy bass part, and the vocal part doesn't really relate to it very much. Eventually I got it, but it took a lot of practice." ~ Geddy Lee	
"Tai Shan"	Hold Your Fire	1987	Inspired by Mount Tai.	
"High Water"	Hold Your Fire	1987	Inspired by mankind's evolution from water-dwelling creatures.	
"The Rhythm Method"	A Show of Hands	1989	Drum solo	
"Show Don't Tell"	Presto	1989	Peart's voice is mixed in low in the background on the lines, "I will be the judge / Give the jury direction."	
"Chain Lightning"	Presto	1989	"...the whole idea of the song was response and how people respond to things...a lot of the thrust of that song is how things are transferred, like chain lightning or enthusiasm or energy or love are things that are contagious, and if someone feels them, they are easily transferable to another person,...‘Reflected in another pair of eyes’ is the idea that it's a wonderful thing already,...but if there's someone else there with you to share it, then it multiplies, you know, it becomes exponentially a bigger experience..." ~ Neil Peart	
"The Pass"	Presto	1989	Speaks to the friends of those who have committed suicide.	
"War Paint"	Presto	1989	Refers to cosmetic makeup and the psychological masks of youth.	
"Scars"	Presto	1989	"I think it's part of everyone's experience that a certain record reflects a certain period of their life, and that's a pleasurable scar, you know, there's a mark left on you, a psychological fingerprint left by a very positive experience. And music is an easy one, but it translates to so many other parts of life where it's a given that, for instance, the sense of smell is one of the strongest forces in your memory, where a given smell will suddenly conjure up a whole time of your life, and again, it triggers another scar, it triggers another psychological imprint that was left by a pleasurable thing..." ~ Neil Peart	
"Presto"	Presto	1989	"I had used ‘Presto’ in an ironic sense, in wishing that I had magic powers to make things right. And I really just liked the word."	
"Superconductor"	Presto	1989	The line That's Entertainment! refers to the film on musicals with the same name.	
"Anagram"	Presto	1989	Subtitled For Mongo as a tribute to the Mel Brooks film Blazing Saddles which contains a scene when the character Bart calls out "Candygram for Mongo".	
"Red Tide"	Presto	1989	Inspired by the phenomenon known as a Red tide.	
"Hand Over Fist"	Presto	1989	Inspired by the game Rock-paper-scissors.	
"Available Light"	Presto	1989	"On a tune like ‘Available Light,’ where the bass just provides some simple, low-end support, I'd rather play the keyboards and sing. It's just a question of what instrument will be rewarding to play from a player's point of view..." ~ Geddy Lee	
"Dreamline"	Roll the Bones	1991	Inspired by The Trinity Paradox by Kevin Anderson.	
"Bravado"	Roll the Bones	1991	"We will pay the price, but we will not count the cost" is a line from the book The Tidewater Tales by John Barth.	
"Roll the Bones"	Roll the Bones	1991	Lee performs the rap section using a digitally lowered version of his voice.	
"Face Up"	Roll the Bones	1991	Inspired by card games with a wild card option.	
"Where's My Thing?"	Roll the Bones	1991	"Gangster of Boats" Trilogy: Part IV	
"The Big Wheel"	Roll the Bones	1991	"...It's where I’ve looked for a universal of that trade-off between innocence and experience, and (The Big Wheel) certainly addresses that...." ~ Neil Peart	
"Heresy"	Roll the Bones	1991	Inspired by the falling of the Berlin Wall.	
"Ghost of a Chance"	Roll the Bones	1991	...‘Ghost of a Chance’ fit right in with my overall theme of randomness and contingency and so on, but at the same time it was a chance for me to write about love in a different way, of saying, ‘Here are all these things that we go through in life and the people we meet, it's all by chance.... ~ Neil Peart	
"Neurotica"	Roll the Bones	1991	"Some people can't deal with the world as it is, or themselves as they are, and feel powerless to change things—so they get all crazy. They waste away their lives in delusions, paranoia, aimless rage, and neuroses, and in the process they often make those around them miserable, too. Strained friendships, broken couples, warped children. I think they should all stop it." ~ Neil Peart	
"You Bet Your Life"	Roll the Bones	1991	"I particularly like the lyrics in ‘You Bet Your Life.’ I wove together all the different religions and musical styles and everything. Those kinds of things are really fun and satisfying...." ~ Neil Peart	
"Animate"	Counterparts	1993	Addresses man's anima as defined by Carl Jung.	
"Stick It Out"	Counterparts	1993	"I love the riff. It's a great riff song. I love playing it, and it's a very bass-heavy song, which always makes me happy." ~ Geddy Lee	
"Cut to the Chase"	Counterparts	1993	"Genius is the fire that lights itself." ~ Neil Peart	
"Nobody's Hero"	Counterparts	1993	Orchestration: Michael Kamen; Inspired in part by the death of a friend of Neil Peart, named Ellis.	
"Between Sun and Moon"	Counterparts	1993	Co-written by Pye Dubois. "Pete Townshend can make an acoustic sound so heavy and powerful. I’ve always admired that. On ‘Between Sun and Moon’ there's a musical bridge before the solo that's very Who-ish. I even throw Keith Richards in there. The song is really a tribute to the ’60s." ~ Alex Lifeson	
"Alien Shore"	Counterparts	1993	The voice in the beginning of the song is Lifeson holding his nostrils closed, saying 'out of my nose'.	
"The Speed of Love"	Counterparts	1993	"...a song about love, about the subject of it....demythologizing, debunking." ~ Neil Peart	
"Double Agent"	Counterparts	1993	"...it's one of the goofiest songs I think we’ve ever written, but I’m quite happy with the result. In its own way, I think it's an interesting little piece of lunacy." ~ Geddy Lee	
"Leave That Thing Alone"	Counterparts	1993	"I think this is the best instrumental we've ever written." ~ Geddy Lee	
"Cold Fire"	Counterparts	1993	"I had been inspired, I think, by a Paul Simon song, where I wanted to couch song lyrics in conversation—he said, she said, and all that. Simon has a song, maybe on Rhythm of the Saints, where it's in conversation." ~ Neil Peart	
"Everyday Glory"	Counterparts	1993	"This song ended up being an analog-tape mix. For the last few years I’ve mixed only to digital, because I figured it was just a better tape recorder. But certain songs have a heavier midrange content, and on playback the analog recorder softens the midrange a bit, giving it a more likable sound." ~ Geddy Lee	
"Test for Echo"	Test for Echo	1996	Co-written by Pye Dubois. "The lyrics give a video-view of this wacky world of ours and offers this tacit response: ‘Excuse me, does anybody else think this is weird? Am I weird?’ While the answer to those questions might be ‘Yes!’ it's good to know that you're not the only one, that you're not alone." ~ Neil Peart	
"Driven"	Test for Echo	1996	"...is just from a bass player's point of view. I wrote that song with three tracks of bass. I brought it to Alex and said, ‘Here's the song; I did three tracks of bass, but I just did that to fill in for the guitar,’ and he said, ‘Let's keep it with the three basses.’ So, I said, ‘I love you.'" ~ Geddy Lee	
"Half the World"	Test for Echo	1996	"...is one of our finest moments as songwriters as far as writing a concise song without being wimpy or syrupy. It's got a little bit of everything: nice melody, and yet it’s still aggressive. It’s hard for us to write that kind of song, really. You’d have to go back to ‘Closer to the Heart’ to find an example of that."	
"The Color of Right"	Test for Echo	1996	Inspired by the legal term: colour of right.	
"Time and Motion"	Test for Echo	1996	Inspired by music artists Soundgarden and Smashing Pumpkins.	
"Totem"	Test for Echo	1996	"The choruses in ‘Totem’ are really interesting. I created a soundscape by using harmonics with a kind of Celtic melody over it that's quite distant. In the song, in terms of dynamics, it's a really beautiful shift." ~ Alex Lifeson	
"Dog Years"	Test for Echo	1996	Inspired by the aging profile of dogs.	
"Virtuality"	Test for Echo	1996	Inspired by the concept of virtual reality.	
"Resist"	Test for Echo	1996	The instrument played at the beginning of the song is a hammer dulcimer.	
"Limbo"	Test for Echo	1996	Instrumental with the inclusion of the line "Whatever happened to my Transylvania twist?" from the song Monster Mash by Bobby "Boris" Pickett and the Crypt-Kickers.	
"Carve Away the Stone"	Test for Echo	1996	Inspired by Sisyphus.	
"The Rhythm Method 1997"	Different Stages	1998	Drum solo	
"One Little Victory"	Vapor Trails	2002	"We fiddled with the order of the songs on Vapor Trails right up until the last minute. However, we never doubted which song would open the album, for "One Little Victory" made such an uncompromising announcement: "They’re ba-a-a-ack!"" ~ Neil Peart	
"Ceiling Unlimited"	Vapor Trails	2002	Inspired by the weather and aeronautical term referring to the height of the lowest obscuring cloud layer above the ground.	
"Ghost Rider"	Vapor Trails	2002	Based on the self-imposed exile of Peart after losing both his daughter and wife within a 10-month period.	
"Peaceable Kingdom"	Vapor Trails	2002	Inspired by the Peaceable Kingdom series of paintings by Edward Hicks. Inspired by the 9/11 tragedy.	
"The Stars Look Down"	Vapor Trails	2002	Inspired by the title of a novel with the same name written by A. J. Cronin.	
"How It Is"	Vapor Trails	2002	The line "foot upon the stair, shoulder to the wheel" was inspired by Thomas Wolfe.	
"Vapor Trail"	Vapor Trails	2002	Inspired by the long thin artificial clouds that sometimes form behind aircraft known as a contrail.	
"Secret Touch"	Vapor Trails	2002	The line "secret touch on the heart" comes from Joseph Conrad’s Victory and "there is never love without pain" comes from Sister of My Heart by Chitra Banerjee Divakaruni.	
"Earthshine"	Vapor Trails	2002	Inspired by the reflected light phenomenon of earthshine.	
"Sweet Miracle"	Vapor Trails	2002	"The lyrics I felt were very moving, and the melody just came out of me." ~ Geddy Lee	
"Nocturne"	Vapor Trails	2002	Inspired by the issue What Do Dreams Want? in the periodical Utne Reader.	
"Freeze"	Vapor Trails	2002	Fear: Part IV	
"Out of the Cradle"	Vapor Trails	2002	Inspired by Out of the Cradle Endlessly Rocking by Walt Whitman.	
"O Baterista"	Rush in Rio	2003	Drum solo Translates as "The Drummer" in Portuguese.	
"Summertime Blues"	Feedback	2004	Eddie Cochran cover song from Neil Peart's early pre-Rush career reproduced for the album.	
"Heart Full of Soul"	Feedback	2004	The Yardbirds cover song.	
"For What It's Worth"	Feedback	2004	Buffalo Springfield cover song from Alex Lifeson's early pre-Rush career reproduced for the album.	
"The Seeker"	Feedback	2004	The Who cover song.	
"Mr. Soul"	Feedback	2004	Buffalo Springfield cover song from early Rush band reproduced for the album.	
"Seven and Seven Is"	Feedback	2004	Love cover song.	
"Shapes of Things"	Feedback	2004	The Yardbirds cover song from early Rush band reproduced for the album.	
"Crossroads"	Feedback	2004	Robert Johnson cover song from Neil Peart's early pre-Rush career and early Rush band reproduced for the album.	
"R30 Overture"	R30: 30th Anniversary World Tour	2005	I. "Finding My Way"; II. "Anthem"; III. "Bastille Day"; IV. "A Passage to Bangkok"; V. "Cygnus X-1"; VI. "Hemispheres: Prelude"	
"Der Trommler"	R30: 30th Anniversary World Tour	2005	Drum solo; Translates as "The Drummer" in German.	
"Far Cry"	Snakes & Arrows	2007	"It was almost like we already knew the song when we wrote it. We just played it. And that was really cool. That doesn't happen very often. We were high-fiving and the whole thing, because it's a relief when something like that happens, for sure." ~ Alex Lifeson	
"Armor and Sword"	Snakes & Arrows	2007	"Spiritual yearnings are natural to many people and may give them solace or hope, but extremists of any kind are not content with faith as armor, they must forge it into a sword." ~ Neil Peart	
"Workin' Them Angels"	Snakes & Arrows	2007	"I didn't think I was foolhardy or irresponsible, but a certain level of risk in life seemed worthwhile for the promised return—excitement and treasured experiences—and though I didn't really believe in ‘them angels,’ if I had them, I guessed I kept them pretty busy." ~ Neil Peart	
"The Larger Bowl"	Snakes & Arrows	2007	Pantoum.	
"Spindrift"	Snakes & Arrows	2007	Inspired by Robert Frost’s epitaph, "I had a lover's quarrel with the world."	
"The Main Monkey Business"	Snakes & Arrows	2007	Title inspired by a conversation Geddy Lee had with his Polish mother.	
"The Way the Wind Blows"	Snakes & Arrows	2007	Compares the way our views are shaped as children to the way trees are shaped by the force of the wind over the years. If we grow up with extremist, intolerant views among our parents and others who are influential in our lives, then we can expect our views to reflect that extremism and intolerance.	
"Hope"	Snakes & Arrows	2007	Instrumental for twelve-string guitar performed by Alex Lifeson.	
"Faithless"	Snakes & Arrows	2007	Strings: Ben Mink; "To me there were two kinds of faith: a good kind that could be protective and help people, and a bad kind that was militant and you wanted to kill people." ~ Neil Peart	
"Bravest Face"	Snakes & Arrows	2007	We can never know reality beyond the surface, so accept reality as we see it and put on our bravest face.	
"Good News First"	Snakes & Arrows	2007	"I kind of couch the lyrics in the traditional relationship song of a quarrel between two people, but, again, it's in fact me arguing with these whole masses of people who just happen to disagree with me." ~ Neil Peart	
"Malignant Narcissism"	Snakes & Arrows	2007	Inspired by the antisocial personality disorder known as malignant narcissism.	
"We Hold On"	Snakes & Arrows	2007	The line "measured out in coffee breaks" is from T.S. Eliot.	
"De Slagwerker"	Snakes & Arrows Live	2008	Drum solo; Translates as "Drummer" in Dutch.	
"Moto Perpetuo"	Time Machine 2011: Live in Cleveland	2011	Drum solo; Title is defined as a fast instrumental passage made up of notes of equal length.	
"O'Malley's Break"	Time Machine 2011: Live in Cleveland	2011	Guitar solo	
"Caravan"	Clockwork Angels	2012	Single released 2010; album released 2012; The line "In a world lit only by fire" comes from the title of a history of medieval times by William Manchester.	
"BU2B"	Clockwork Angels	2012	Single released 2010; album released 2012; A soliloquy and pantoum.	
"Clockwork Angels"	Clockwork Angels	2012	Contains a "bluesy bar band section" midway through the song.	
"The Anarchist"	Clockwork Angels	2012	Strings arranged and conducted by David Campbell.	
"Carnies"	Clockwork Angels	2012	Inspired by Robertson Davies and Herbert Gold.	
"Halo Effect"	Clockwork Angels	2012	Strings arranged and conducted by David Campbell.	
"Seven Cities of Gold"	Clockwork Angels	2012	Inspired by the myth of the Seven Cities of Gold.	
"The Wreckers"	Clockwork Angels	2012	Strings arranged and conducted by David Campbell.	
"Headlong Flight"	Clockwork Angels	2012	Inspired by Freddie Gruber.	
"BU2B2"	Clockwork Angels	2012	Strings arranged and conducted by David Campbell.	
"Wish Them Well"	Clockwork Angels	2012	"We always loved the lyrics, but this was a tough song to figure out," ~ Alex Lifeson	
"The Garden"	Clockwork Angels	2012	Strings arranged and conducted by David Campbell; Piano: Jason Sniderman	
"Here It Is!"	Clockwork Angels Tour	2013	Drum solo	
"Drumbastica"	Clockwork Angels Tour	2013	Drum solo; interlude during "Headlong Flight"	
"Peke's Repose"	Clockwork Angels Tour	2013	Guitar solo; lead-in to "Halo Effect"	
"The Percussor"	Clockwork Angels Tour	2013	Drum solo; I. "Binary Love Theme"; II. "Steambanger's Ball"	
"The Story So Far"	R40 Live	2015	Drum solo; interlude during "Cygnus X-1"	

== Solo projects ==
=== Alex Lifeson ===
Victor

Song	Album	Year	Notes	Ref.
"Don't Care"	Victor	1996	Vocals: Edwin; Drums: Blake Manning	
"Promise"	Victor	1996	Vocals: Edwin; Drums: Blake Manning	
"Start Today"	Victor	1996	Vocals: Dalbello; Drums: Blake Manning	
"Mr. X"	Victor	1996	Bass: Peter Cardinali; Drums: Blake Manning	
"At the End"	Victor	1996	Vocals: Edwin; Programming: Adrian Zivojinovich	
"Sending Out a Warning"	Victor	1996	Vocals: Edwin; Drums: Blake Manning	
"Shut Up Shuttin' Up"	Victor	1996	Bass: Peter Cardinali; Drums: Blake Manning	
"Strip and Go Naked"	Victor	1996	Drums: Blake Manning	
"The Big Dance"	Victor	1996	Vocals: Edwin; Bass: Les Claypool; Programming: Adrian Zivojinovich	
"Victor"	Victor	1996	Bass: Peter Cardinali; Horns: Colleen Allen; Drums: Blake Manning; From collected poems of W.H. Auden	
"I Am the Spirit"	Victor	1996	Vocals: Edwin; Drums: Blake Manning	

Lerxst Demo Archives

Song	Album	Year	Notes	Ref.
"Kroove"	Lerxst Demo Archives Pt 1	1996	Instrumental; written and recorded in Lifeson's home studio	
"Banjo Bob"	Lerxst Demo Archives Pt 1	1999	Instrumental; recorded at Lerxst Sound with Jim MacLellan	
"Serbs"	Lerxst Demo Archives Pt 1	1999	Instrumental; with Jim MacLellan	

Alex Lifeson

Song	Album	Year	Notes	Ref.
"Cherry Lopez Lullaby"	Alex Lifeson	2021	Instrumental written during the mix session of Clockwork Angels while in LA for months starting early 2012	
"Kabul Blues (instrumental)"	Alex Lifeson	2021	Andy Curran (bass guitar)	
"Spy House (instrumental)"	Alex Lifeson	2021	Andy Curran (bass guitar); David Quinton Steinberg (drums)	

Envy of None

Song	Album	Year	Notes	Ref.
"Never Said I Love You"	Envy of None	2022	Vocals: Maiah Wynne, Guitar: Alfio Annibalini, Bass: Andy Curran	
"Shadow"	Envy of None	2022	Vocals: Maiah Wynne, Guitar: Alfio Annibalini, Bass: Andy Curran	
"Look Inside"	Envy of None	2022	Vocals: Maiah Wynne, Guitar: Alfio Annibalini, Bass: Andy Curran	
"Liar"	Envy of None	2022	Vocals: Maiah Wynne, Guitar: Alfio Annibalini, Bass: Andy Curran	
"Spy House"	Envy of None	2022	Vocals: Maiah Wynne, Guitar: Alfio Annibalini, Bass: Andy Curran	
"Dog's Life"	Envy of None	2022	Vocals: Maiah Wynne, Guitar: Alfio Annibalini, Bass: Andy Curran	
"Kabul Blues"	Envy of None	2022	Vocals: Maiah Wynne, Guitar: Alfio Annibalini, Bass: Andy Curran	
"Old Strings"	Envy of None	2022	Vocals: Maiah Wynne, Guitar: Alfio Annibalini, Bass: Andy Curran	
"Dumb"	Envy of None	2022	Vocals: Maiah Wynne, Guitar: Alfio Annibalini, Bass: Andy Curran	
"Enemy"	Envy of None	2022	Vocals: Maiah Wynne, Guitar: Alfio Annibalini, Bass: Andy Curran	
"Western Sunset"	Envy of None	2022	Vocals: Maiah Wynne, Guitar: Alfio Annibalini, Bass: Andy Curran	
"Lethe River"	That Was Then, This Is Now EP	2023	Vocals: Maiah Wynne, Guitar: Alfio Annibalini, Bass: Andy Curran	
"You'll Be Sorry"	That Was Then, This Is Now EP	2023	Vocals: Maiah Wynne, Guitar: Alfio Annibalini, Bass: Andy Curran	
"Dog's Life (Remix)"	That Was Then, This Is Now EP	2023	Vocals: Maiah Wynne, Guitar: Alfio Annibalini, Bass: Andy Curran	
"Dumb (Der Dummkopf Remix)"	That Was Then, This Is Now EP	2023	Vocals: Maiah Wynne, Guitar: Alfio Annibalini, Bass: Andy Curran	
"That Was Then"	That Was Then, This Is Now EP	2023	Vocals: Maiah Wynne, Guitar: Alfio Annibalini, Bass: Andy Curran	

=== Geddy Lee ===
Song	Album	Year	Notes	Ref.
"My Favorite Headache"	My Favorite Headache	2000	Drums: Matt Cameron	
"The Present Tense"	My Favorite Headache	2000	Drums: Matt Cameron	
"Window to the World"	My Favorite Headache	2000	Drums: Matt Cameron; Steel Guitar: Waylon Wall	
"Working at Perfekt"	My Favorite Headache	2000	Drums: Matt Cameron; Cellos: John Friesen	
"Runaway Train"	My Favorite Headache	2000	Drums: Matt Cameron	
"The Angels' Share"	My Favorite Headache	2000	Drums: Matt Cameron	
"Moving to Bohemia"	My Favorite Headache	2000	Drums: Matt Cameron	
"Home on the Strange"	My Favorite Headache	2000	Drums: Jeremy Taggart	
"Slipping"	My Favorite Headache	2000	Drums: Matt Cameron; Vocals (backward): Pappy Rosen	
"Still"	My Favorite Headache	2000	Drums: Matt Cameron	
"Grace to Grace"	My Favorite Headache	2000	Drums: Matt Cameron	
"Gone"	The Lost Demos	2023	Mixed by David Bottrill	
"I Am, You Are"	The Lost Demos	2023	Guitar & Violin: Ben Mink Mixed by David Bottrill	

=== Neil Peart ===
Song	Album	Year	Notes	Ref.
"Pieces of Eight"	Modern Drummer Flexi-Disc release	1987	Drum solo audio track	
"Momo's Dance Party"	A Work in Progress (film)	1997	Drum solo audio track	
"The Hockey Theme"		2009	Neil Peart arranged and re-recorded the NHL Hockey Theme for NHL broadcasts on TSN and RDS.	

== Collaborations ==
=== Duo projects ===
Alex Lifeson and Geddy Lee

Song	Album	Year	Notes	Ref.
"O Canada"	South Park: Bigger, Longer & Uncut	1999	With Terrance and Phillip	
"I Fought the Law"	Trailer Park Boys: The Movie	2006	The Big Dirty Band; Supergroup formed by Alex Lifeson	

=== Trio projects ===
Song	Album	Year	Notes	Ref.
"Battle Scar"	Universal Juveniles	1980	Max Webster featuring Rush	
"Tough Break"	Unreleased single	1981	"The Fab Pros" (Rush and two crew members: Tony Geranios; Skip Gildersleeve)	

=== Alex Lifeson ===
Song	Album	Year	Notes	Ref.
"Crying Over You"	Alien Shores	1985	Guitar solo for Platinum Blonde	
"Holy Water"	Alien Shores	1985	Guitar solo for Platinum Blonde	
"Beyond Borders"	N/A	1987	Guitar for Canadian Guitar Summit for Guitar Player Magazine. Written by Rik Emmett.	
"In the Danger Zone"	Serious Business	1988	Guitar solo for Greenway. Features Aldo Nova on keyboard.	
"Smoke on the Water"	The Earthquake Album	1989	Guitar for Rock Aid Armenia	
"All the Lovers in the World"	Lost Brotherhood	1990	Guitar for Lawrence Gowan	
"Lost Brotherhood"	Lost Brotherhood	1990	Guitar for Lawrence Gowan	
"Call It a Mission"	Lost Brotherhood	1990	Guitar for Lawrence Gowan	
"The Dragon"	Lost Brotherhood	1990	Guitar for Lawrence Gowan	
"Love Makes You Believe"	Lost Brotherhood	1990	Guitar for Lawrence Gowan	
"Fire It Up"	Lost Brotherhood	1990	Guitar for Lawrence Gowan	
"Out of a Deeper Hunger"	Lost Brotherhood	1990	Guitar for Lawrence Gowan	
"Tender Young Hero"	Lost Brotherhood	1990	Guitar for Lawrence Gowan	
"Message from Heaven"	Lost Brotherhood	1990	Guitar for Lawrence Gowan	
"Holding This Rage"	Lost Brotherhood	1990	Guitar for Lawrence Gowan	
"Just Scream"	Ragged Ass Road	1995	Guitar solo for Tom Cochrane	
"Crawl"	Ragged Ass Road	1995	Guitar for Tom Cochrane	
"Will of the Gun"	Ragged Ass Road	1995	Guitar for Tom Cochrane	
"Like a Girl"	Scenery and Fish	1996	Guitar for I Mother Earth	
"The Little Drummer Boy"	Merry Axemas: A Guitar Christmas	1997	In collaboration with multiple hard rock artists	
"March of the High Guard"	Gene Roddenberry's Andromeda	2000	Television series soundtrack composed 2000; released 2002	
"Wasted Me"	The Better Life	2000	Guitar and producer for 3 Doors Down; released on special Australian 2-CD set and B-side import single of Kryptonite.	
"Dangerous Game"	Away from the Sun	2000	Guitar and producer for 3 Doors Down; released in 2002.	
"Dead Love"	Unreleased single	2000	Guitar and producer for 3 Doors Down	
"Star 24 (No Apologies)"	Born 4	2006	Guitar for Jakalope	
"Anesthetize"	Fear of a Blank Planet	2007	Guitar solo for Porcupine Tree	
"Sacred and Mundane"	Fly Paper	2008	Guitar for Tiles	
"Don't Look Back"	The Double	2011	Outro for the movie The Double	
"Losin'"	All is More Than Both	2012	Guitar solo for Jason Plumb	
"Once A Warrior"	Disconnect	2014	Guitar solo for John Wesley	
"End of the Line"	RES9	2016	Guitar for Rik Emmett	
"Human Race"	RES9	2016	Guitar (twelve-string) for Rik Emmett	
"On That Note"	Borrego	2017	Guitar/co-written for Marco Minnemann	
"South End"	Borrego	2017	Guitar for Marco Minnemann	
"Il Monstro Atomico"	Clone of the Universe	2018	Guitar for Fu Manchu	
"Evil and Here to Stay"	Nobody Told Me	2019	Guitar for John Mayall	
"My Sister"	My Sister	2019	Guitar (electric and acoustic)/Co-producer with Marco Minnemann; featuring Dave Kollar (Guitar) and Mikaela Attard (Vocals)	
"Lovers Calling"	My Sister	2019	Guitar (electric and acoustic)/Co-producer with Marco Minnemann; featuring Mohini Dey (Bass) and Maia Wynne (Vocals); Also available as an EP as well as instrumental version.	
"One Day"	Atheists and Believers	2019	Guitar for The Mute Gods	
"Charmed"	American Rock 'n' Roll	2019	Guitar for Don Felder	
"I Have Seen the Way"	The Atlas Underground Flood	2021	Guitar for Tom Morello	

=== Geddy Lee ===
Song	Album	Year	Notes	Ref.
"Take Off"	Great White North	1981	Vocals for comedians Bob and Doug McKenzie; Highest charting Hot 100 single for any member of Rush (#16; 27 Mar 1982)	
"All the Horses Running"	Vignettes	1983	Bass for Marie-Lynn Hammond	
"Over Queen Charlotte Sound"	Vignettes	1983	Bass for Marie-Lynn Hammond	
"Tears Are Not Enough"	We Are the World	1985	Vocals (supporting) for Northern Lights	
"Good for Sule"	Blue Green Orange	1999	Bass for I Mother Earth	
"When I Close My Eyes"	Transylvania Avenue	2010	Bass for The Black Sea Station	
"March of the Shikker"	Transylvania Avenue	2010	Vocals for The Black Sea Station	
"Territory"	The Great Detachment	2016	Bass for Wintersleep	

=== Neil Peart ===
Song	Album	Year	Notes	Ref.
"Retribution"	J.R Flood	1970	Drums for J.R. Flood Demo	
"Gypsy"	J.R Flood	1970	Drums for J.R. Flood Demo	
"Wake Up"	J.R Flood	1970	Drums for J.R. Flood Demo	
"It's Not Hard"	J.R Flood	1970	Drums for J.R. Flood Demo	
"Lonely Man"	J.R Flood	1970	Drums for J.R. Flood Demo	
"Tide Keeps Rollin'"	J.R Flood	1970	Drums for J.R. Flood Demo	
"Flaming Blackbird"	J.R Flood	1970	Drums for J.R. Flood Demo	
"Giant Killer"	J.R Flood	1970	Drums for J.R. Flood Demo	
"Polar Bear"	J.R Flood	1970	Drums for J.R. Flood Demo	
"Champion"	Champion	1985	Drums for Jeff Berlin	
"Marabi"	Champion	1985	Drums for Jeff Berlin	
"Cottontail"	Burning for Buddy Volume 1	1994	Tribute to Buddy Rich	
"One O'Clock Jump"	Burning for Buddy Volume 2	1997	Tribute to Buddy Rich	
"Save Me From Myself"	Burning the Days	2009	Drums for Vertical Horizon	
"Welcome to the Bottom"	Burning the Days	2009	Drums for Vertical Horizon	
"Even Now"	Burning the Days	2009	Drums and Lyrics for Vertical Horizon	
"Instamatic"	Echoes from the Underground	2013	Drums for Vertical Horizon	
"South for the Winter"	Echoes from the Underground	2013	Drums for Vertical Horizon	
"The Impulsive Type"	Untold Tales	2017	Drums for Glass Hammer	

== See also ==
- Rush discography
- List of Rush instrumentals
