= Distant Early Warning =

Distant Early Warning may refer to:

- Distant Early Warning Line, a series of radar stations in the Arctic, operated during the Cold War by the United States, Canada, Greenland and Iceland
- "Distant Early Warning", a song by the Canadian rock band Rush from the album Grace Under Pressure (1984)
