= Empat perkataan =

Poetic form in Singaporean poetry

The empat perkataan (from the Malay words for "four" and "words") is a poetic form used in contemporary Singaporean poetry in English. The editors of the anthology UnFree Verse group it among "new or re-discovered forms" in Singaporean poetry, alongside the twin cinema and liwuli.

== Structure ==
The classic empat perkataan abides by the following rules and has no fixed length.

- All lines consist of exactly four words.
- The four words should not proceed in traditional sentence form but consist of fragments associated by either meaning or sound.
- The lines are rhymed or assonant with a rhyme scheme either conforming to couplets (AABBCCDD), or alternating rhymes (ABABCDCD).
- In its strictest form, all of the words in an empat perkataan should be of two syllables.

At its best, the empat perkataan can create a surprising confluence of associated meaning and mood reminiscent of more post-modern forms.

== Variants ==
The classic version of the form with adherence to all rules is known as the empat perkataan perempuan. Less adherent versions omitting the two-syllable rule are known as empat perkataan sajak, whereas the simplest version not adhering to any rhyme scheme or syllabic constraints is known as the empat perkataan kosong.

== See also ==
- Pantoum or Pantun
- Syair
- Hainteny
