= Spin drift =

Spin drift can refer to:

- Spindrift, a song from Rush's 2007 album Snakes & Arrows
- The Magnus effect
