= Witch Hunt (song) =

Song by Rush

Song by Rush

from the album Moving Pictures
- Released: February 12, 1981
- Recorded: December 8, 1980
- Genre: Progressive rock
- Length: 4:46
- Label: Anthem
- Composers: Alex Lifeson; Geddy Lee
- Lyricist: Neil Peart
- Producers: Rush; Terry Brown

Moving Pictures track listing
- 7 tracks Side one: 1. "Tom Sawyer"; 2. "Red Barchetta"; 3. "YYZ"; 4. "Limelight"; Side two: 1. "The Camera Eye"; 2. "Witch Hunt"; 3. "Vital Signs"

"Witch Hunt" is a song by Canadian rock band Rush. It was released on their 1981 album Moving Pictures, and unlike many other Rush songs it was a true studio production, with a variety of percussion instruments and overdubs, and a separate keyboard player. It is the first of four songs in what has been called the band's "Fear" series, the other three being "The Weapon" (from Signals, 1982), "The Enemy Within" (from Grace Under Pressure, 1984), and "Freeze" (from Vapor Trails, 2002), although this song is the third part of the series in order, and went on reverse chronological order by the album (except that "Freeze" is the exact fourth part of the series like normal chronological order).

== Content, lyrics, and production ==
The song opens with the sounds of a mob, which Lifeson explained was recorded outside Le Studio on a cold December day, with the band and others shouting, warmed by a bottle of Scotch whiskey; they recorded a dozen tracks of this. The lyrics describe how a vigilante mob gathers under torch light, distorting the features of the "twisted and grotesque" faces: "The righteous rise / With burning eyes / Of hatred and ill-will / Madmen fed on fear and lies / To beat and burn and kill". The lyrics do not explain what the mob intends to do, but in the second set of stanzas indicate that the mob feeds on xenophobia and religious zealotry: "They say there are strangers who threaten us / Our immigrants and infidels / They say there is strangeness too dangerous / In our theaters and bookstore shelves".

Neil Peart explained later that the song was done as "a studio production number", as opposed to most other songs, which were done as a three-piece band. It features a broad array of percussive instruments: "gong bass drums, wind chimes, glockenspiel, tubular bells, conga, cowbell, vibraslap, various electronic effects", according to Peart. Cover designer Hugh Syme contributed synthesizer and in one verse the drums are double-tracked. Music critic Martin Popoff described it as "the most reworked and fretted-over song of the album".

The song was recorded on the same day as the death of John Lennon. Geddy Lee commented, "We were right in the middle of recording it when that all went down."

=== Critical evaluations ===
The "foreboding" song's lyrics are written by Neil Peart, and they "criticize intolerance", according to Steven Horwitz, who places the song in the context of the Moral Majority of the late 1970s and early 1980s, when "those who know what's best for us" were invited to "rise and save us from ourselves". Max Mobley, writing in 2014, recognized themes from Kurt Vonnegut in the song and remarked that the "song seems incredibly relevant today", "given how intolerant and angry we are today".

== Live performance ==
"Witch Hunt" was not played live until the Grace Under Pressure Tour, when it appeared as part of the "Fear" trilogy in sequence. It was also played during the following Power Windows Tour as a standalone number. After this, it disappeared from the regular live setlist until its return during the Snakes & Arrows Tour (where it was a good fit, according to Max Mobley, "in...mood and message"). It was also played on the following Time Machine Tour but was removed from the band's following two tours. It has reappeared in setlists on the Fifty Something Tour when the band plays the Moving Pictures album in its entirety. "Witch Hunt" was the only song from Moving Pictures not to be performed on that album's tour.

On the Grace Under Pressure tour, the song acquired an additional lengthy guitar solo at the end, as can be seen on the tour video. For Andrew Cole, a musician and English professor at Princeton, this is an instance of Lifeson "translating" (a term Cole uses in the way in which Walter Benjamin used it) the original—the guitar "embellishing, nay, translating Geddy's flangey breakout bass part from the studio cut". The later version on A Show of Hands has a "more elaborate" solo: "Rush practices Benjaminian translation in homage to its own originals, plausibly knowing that interest can lie as much in variation as in fidelity".

== See also ==
- List of Rush songs
