= Sisindiran =

Sundanese poem

Sisindiran (Banten dialect: Susualan, Badui language: Bangbalikan) is a Sundanese poem in which an allusion (sindir) is given by a combination of words which allude to the real meaning by sound association. Sisindiran (susualan) are often found in Sundanese verse: in tembang Sunda they occur mainly in the Panambih Songs. They invariably consist of a cangkang ("cover, rind, skin") without meaning, followed by a eusi ("content" or "essence"), the real meaning. The association between the "cover" and the real meaning is indicated by structural correspondences of sound and patterns. If the sound patterns of the cangkang and the eusi are parallel, the sisindiran is termed a paparikan. This is the case for instance, in the following poem where the first two lines constitute the cangkang and the third and the fourth lines the eusi:

Sok hayang nyaba ka Bandung
Hayang nyaho pabrik kina
Sok hayang nanya nu pundung
Hayang nyaho mimitina

Often I want to go to Bandung,
I want to see the quinine factory.
Often I want to question a grieved person,
I want to know how it started.

In Indonesian, such paparikan, consisting as a rule of four lines of eight syllables each, are called pantun, not to be confused with the Sundanese (carita) pantun. However, this Indonesian (Malay) pantun often has lines that do not contain exactly eight syllables (see for examples in Braasem 1950).

== See also ==
- Sundanese people
