= The Spirit of Radio =

- UK 7" single

Single by Rush

from the album Permanent Waves
- B-side: "Circumstances" (US); "The Trees" (UK)
- Released: December 1979 (promo); February 1980 (single)
- Recorded: 1979
- Studio: Le Studio (Morin-Heights, Quebec)
- Genre: New wave; progressive rock; art rock; power pop
- Length: 4:56 (album version); 3:40 (US/Canada single edit); 3:00 (UK single edit)
- Label: Mercury
- Songwriters: Neil Peart; Geddy Lee; Alex Lifeson
- Producers: Rush; Terry Brown

Rush singles chronology
"Circumstances" (1979)	"The Spirit of Radio" (1979)	"Entre Nous" (1980)
"Resist" (1997)	""The Spirit of Radio" (Live)" (1998)	"One Little Victory" (2002)

Music video
- "The Spirit of Radio" on YouTube

"The Spirit of Radio" is a song by Canadian rock band Rush, released from their 1980 album Permanent Waves. The song's name was inspired by Brampton, Ontario based radio station CFNY-FM's slogan. It was significant in the growing popularity of the band, becoming their first top 30 single in Canada and reaching number 51 on the US Billboard Hot 100.

== Background ==
The introduction of the song was composed in a mixolydian mode scale built on E; most of the rest, barring repetitions of the introductory guitar riff, is in conventional E major.

Guitarist Alex Lifeson explained the song's opening riff as "I just wanted to give it something that gave it a sense of static – radio waves bouncing around, very electric. We had that sequence going underneath, and it was just really to try and get something that was sitting on top of it, that gave it that movement."

"The Spirit of Radio" features the band experimenting with a reggae style in its closing section. Reggae would be explored further on the band's next three records, Moving Pictures, Signals, and Grace Under Pressure. The group had experimented with reggae-influenced riffs in the studio and had come up with a reggae introduction to "Working Man" on their tours, so they decided to incorporate a passage into "The Spirit of Radio", and as Lifeson said, "to make us smile and have a little fun".

Lyrically, the song is a lament on the change of FM radio from free-form to commercial formats during the late 1970s. The Brampton, Ontario based station CFNY-FM—which had not abandoned free-form programming—is cited as an inspiration for the song. The reggae finale also has lyrics inspired by the song "The Sound of Silence" by Simon & Garfunkel. The station's story is told in the 2026 documentary CFNY: The Spirit of Radio, which features Rush's Geddy Lee.

== Single release ==
Rush had grazed the UK Top 40 two years earlier with "Closer to the Heart". However, when "The Spirit of Radio" was issued as a single in February 1980, it reached number 13 on the UK Singles Chart in March. It remains their biggest UK hit to date (the 7" single was a 3:00 edited version which has not appeared on CD, as of 2011). In the US, the single peaked at number 51 on the Billboard Hot 100 in 1980 and number 22 in Canada, and in 1998 a live version of the song reached number 27 on the Mainstream Rock Chart.

Promotional 12-inch copies were released in the United States in late 1979 with the B-sides of "Working Man" and "The Trees", and the song being incorrectly titled "The Spirit of the Radio".

== Reception ==
Cash Box said that "Geddy Lee's high vocals and the band's electrically charged instrumental should click on AOR lists."

"The Spirit of Radio" was named one of The Rock and Roll Hall of Fame's 500 Songs that Shaped Rock and Roll and was among five Rush songs inducted into the Canadian Songwriters Hall of Fame on March 28, 2010. Record World called it a "crafty rocker that's an out-of-the-box AOR-pop smash."

Classic Rock readers voted "The Spirit of Radio" the fourth best Rush song.

The song was covered by the British alternative rock band Catherine Wheel in 1996, with their version appearing both on their B-sides and rarities album Like Cats and Dogs and on the CFNY-branded compilation album Spirit of the Edge, Vol. 2.

== Music video ==
In celebration of the 40th anniversary of Permanent Waves, on June 12, 2020, Rush produced an animated music video by Fantoons Animation Studio. The video features the band as they appeared around 1980. It also features nods to Guglielmo Marconi (an Italian inventor instrumental in the development of radio) as well as radio DJs from the time that were influential in Rush's development. The video also pays homage to Rush's drummer, the late Neil Peart, "whose music and lyrics continue to capture the hearts and imaginations of the fans".

== Weekly charts ==
Weekly chart performance for "The Spirit of Radio"
Chart (1980)	Peak position
Canada Top Singles (RPM)	22
Luxembourg (Radio Luxembourg)	16
UK Singles (Official Charts)	13
US Billboard Hot 100	51

== See also ==
- List of Rush songs
