= Far Cry (Rush song) =

Single by Rush

from the album Snakes & Arrows
- Released: March 12, 2007
- Recorded: 2006
- Genre: Hard rock, progressive rock
- Length: 5:21
- Label: Anthem/Atlantic
- Songwriters: Neil Peart; Geddy Lee; Alex Lifeson
- Producers: Nick Raskulinecz; Rush

Rush singles chronology
"Summertime Blues" (2004)	"Far Cry" (2007)	"Spindrift" (2007)

Music video
- "Rush - Far Cry (Official Video)" on YouTube

Audio sample
- "Far Cry" (2007): file; help

"Far Cry" is a song by the Canadian progressive rock band Rush. It was released as the first single from their 2007 album Snakes & Arrows. It was released to radio on March 12, 2007, then saw a digital release four days later. The song peaked at number 22 on the Billboard Mainstream Rock Tracks chart. It was the ninth-most played song on rock radio stations in Canada in 2007.

Guitarist Alex Lifeson said about the song: "It was almost like we already knew the song when we wrote it. We just played it. And that was realy [sic] cool. That doesn't happen very often. We were high-fiving and the whole thing, because it's a relief when something like that happens, for sure."

"Far Cry" would later be included on Rush's compilation Retrospective 3 (2009).

== Background ==
The song evolved from a studio jam session between Alex Lifeson and Geddy Lee. Neil Peart unexpectedly left lyrics he had just finished on the table with the chorus highlighted. Lee began singing the chorus along with a section of the jam and, according to him, it seemed to fit.

"Far Cry" was played on every tour following its release in 2007 (Snakes & Arrows Tour, Time Machine Tour, Clockwork Angels Tour, R40 Tour, and the Fifty Something Tour).

== Video ==
The video, directed by Christopher Mills, was released on May 8, 2007. It contains extensive stop-motion footage featuring the band's members and clips from their 1970s and 1980s videos.

== See also ==
- List of songs recorded by Rush
