= Entre Nous (Rush song) =

Single by Rush

from the album Permanent Waves
- B-side: "Different Strings"
- Released: April 1980
- Genre: Progressive rock; progressive pop
- Length: 4:37 (album version); 3:45 (single version)
- Label: Mercury
- Songwriters: Neil Peart, Geddy Lee, Alex Lifeson
- Producers: Rush and Terry Brown

Rush singles chronology
"The Spirit of Radio" (1980)	"Entre Nous" (1980)	"Limelight" (1981)

"Entre Nous" ("Between Us" in French) is the fourth track on the 1980 album Permanent Waves by progressive rock band Rush. It was also released as a single. The song appeared on the concert album Snakes & Arrows Live, released on April 15, 2008.

Rolling Stone magazine called the song a "straight-ahead rocker with an artfully segued acoustic chorus." Cash Box called it a "whirling yet highly melodic track" and said it has "a grandiose opening of synthesizer and drum crescendoes." Record World called it a "melodic rocker that spotlights Geddy Lee's stellar vocal."

== Title ==
According to Robert Telleria, the title, which means "between us" in French, comes from Ayn Rand's 1943 novel The Fountainhead and captures the sense of rapport Neil Peart feels with members of the audience. In some foreign pressings, the label included the English translation.

== Personnel ==
- Geddy Lee – lead vocals, bass guitar, synthesizer
- Alex Lifeson – guitars
- Neil Peart – drums
