= Snakes & Arrows =

Studio album by Rush
- Released: May 1, 2007
- Recorded: November–December 2006
- Studios: Grandmaster, Los Angeles, California; Allaire, Shokan, New York
- Genres: Hard rock; progressive rock
- Length: 62:50
- Label: Anthem
- Producers: Nick Raskulinecz; Rush

Rush chronology
Gold (2006)	Snakes & Arrows (2007)	Snakes & Arrows Live (2008)

Singles from Snakes & Arrows
- 1. "Far Cry" Released: March 12, 2007; 2. "Spindrift" Released: June 1, 2007; 3. "The Larger Bowl" Released: June 25, 2007

Snakes & Arrows is the eighteenth studio album by Canadian rock band Rush, released on May 1, 2007 by Anthem Records. After their R30: 30th Anniversary Tour ended in October 2004, the band took a one-year break; during the break, they agreed to start work on a follow-up in January 2006. The album was recorded in five weeks with co-producer Nick Raskulinecz, a fan of the group who was praised by each member for his approach and technique. It contains three instrumental tracks, the most on any Rush album.

Snakes & Arrows was released on CD and a limited edition double LP (5,000 copies) and Music Video Interactive format (25,000 copies). It peaked at No. 3 in Canada and the United States and in September 2007, was certified gold in Canada. Rush were nominated for a Grammy Award for Best Rock Instrumental Performance for "Malignant Narcissism". Snakes & Arrows was named one of Classic Rock's ten essential progressive rock albums of the decade. It was reissued and remastered in 2013 as a part of The Studio Albums 1989–2007 box set. In 2016, it was reissued after being remastered by Sean Magee at Abbey Road Studios following a direct approach by Rush to remaster their entire back catalogue.

The songs "Far Cry" and "Workin' Them Angels" would later appear on Rush's compilation album Retrospective 3 (2009).

== Background and writing ==
In October 2004, Rush finished their R30: 30th Anniversary Tour and began a year-long break in activity. During this time they were involved in the R30: 30th Anniversary World Tour DVD, interviews for which revealed their intention to start on a new studio album in early 2006, their first of new material since Vapor Trails (2002). The group felt charged up having recorded their covers EP Feedback (2004), which saw them play simple and direct songs and record it live as opposed to their own more thought-out and complex music. Such an approach was adopted for Snakes & Arrows.

Work on the album began in January 2006 and the band members adopted their usual writing method of Lee and Lifeson jamming on new musical ideas while Peart works alone on the lyrics. Rather than work in the same facility, this time Lee and Lifeson worked out of their home studios in Toronto and gradually moulded their ideas into arranged songs using a click track as a guide drum part. They worked a three-day week, starting around noon until around 5 p.m. Peart, who'd relocated to southern California in 2000, worked from home and collaborated with his bandmates online and travelled to Toronto and New York throughout the writing and recording phases. Lifeson said that the group did more pre-production work than before and that Lee and himself adopted a more casual and relaxed approach to writing.

Lifeson had met guitarist David Gilmour during Gilmour's tour stop in Toronto who inspired him to write on an acoustic guitar as an indicator of how strong a tune is. Gilmour is thanked in the liner notes of Snakes & Arrows. During the writing sessions, Peart experimented with new equipment such as the Roland V-Drum TD-20, a kit which he used on the album to trigger samples. Much of the album is written in a 3/4 time signature. A writer for the National Post compared much of the material to that of Hemispheres (1978) with the "unexpected, angular chord changes". Peart was inspired to write lyrics on various themes including faith, fear, the association of religion and war, hope and despair, and the religious billboards he saw on his motorcycle journey across the United States which he detailed in his fourth book Roadshow: Landscape with Drums – A Concert Tour by Motorcycle (2006), written during the R30 tour. He was also inspired by Robert Frost's epitaph: "I had a lover's quarrel with the world" and used lyrical ideas that he had initially put down 15 years prior.

In March 2006, Lee and Lifeson had completed rough versions of six tracks and played them to Peart at his house in Quebec. Peart said he would "never forget first hearing the initial few songs for this album. It is always a thrill to hear my words sung for the first time […] there's a sense of affirmation in knowing that Geddy found those words worth singing." Peart was particularly excited upon hearing "Bravest Face" and "The Way the Wind Blows" due to their fresh sound and how different they were from previous Rush songs. He picked "spiritual" as the word that best described the essence of the songs presented to him. Snakes & Arrows features three instrumentals, the most of any Rush album. In May 2006, the three moved into Cherry Beach Sound in Toronto for one month to develop the songs and by early June, they had eight tracks they were happy with. After a summer break, they resumed work in September and "kept working until it was finished."

Peart came up with the album's title as he worked on the lyrics to "Armor and Sword". He'd researched several sources, including the ancient Indian board game leela, a precursor to the modern children's game snakes and ladders, and the quote "slings and arrows" from the Shakespeare play Hamlet. By the time the album was being mixed, the title was agreed upon. Peart wrote that the title was chosen to "describe the 'good' kind of faith as being armor, while the 'bad' kind of faith is a sword". He would always check a master list at a record shop to see if an album title had been used by another band, but this time he searched online and found out about the leela game which had also been called "the game of snakes and arrows". Peart then found a gameboard painted by Harish Johari which he presented to Lee and Lifeson; the three agreed to make it the front cover and worked with their longtime cover designer Hugh Syme to incorporate it into the sleeve layout.

== Recording ==
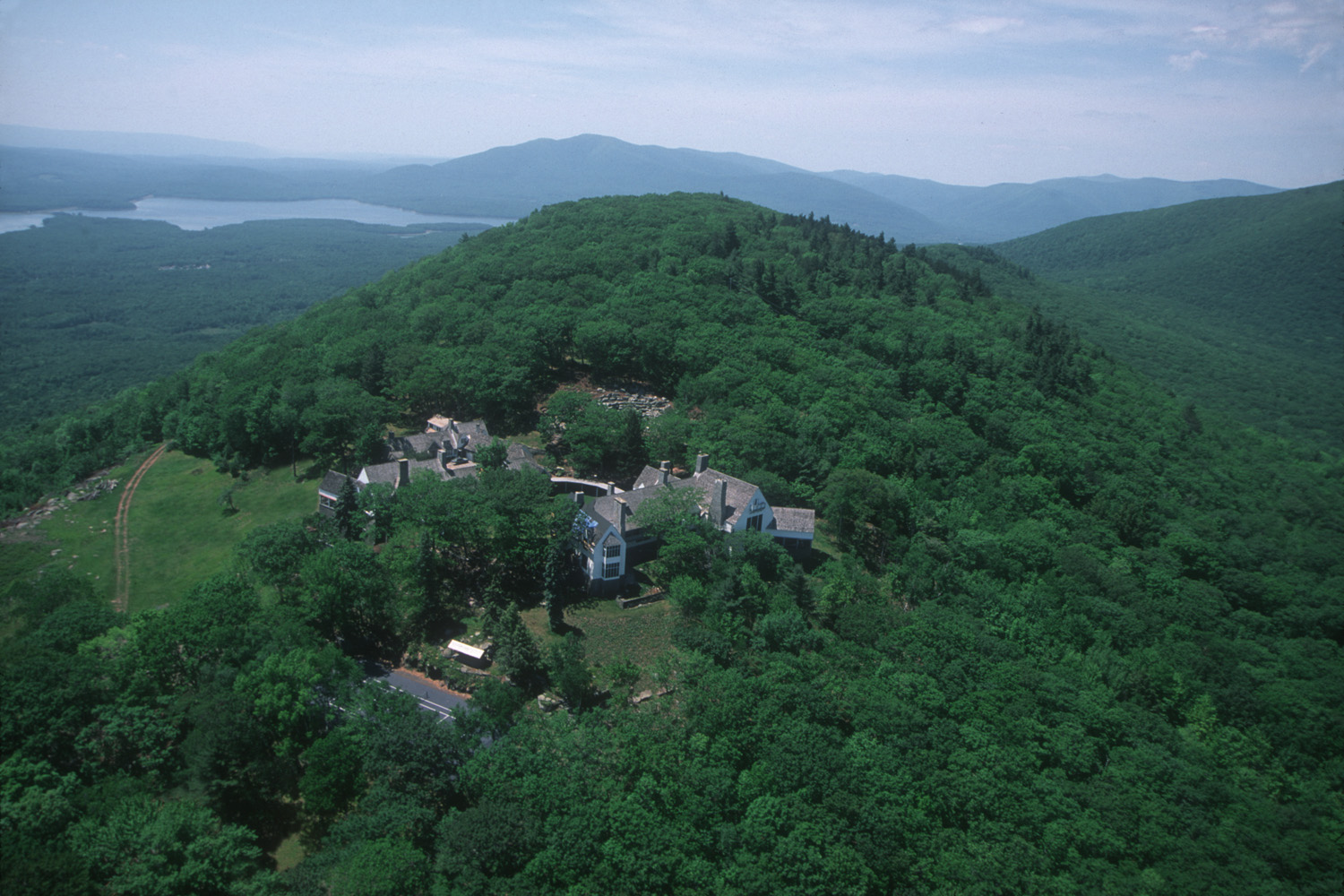
Allaire Studios

The main recording sessions took place across 36 days in November and December 2006 at Allaire Studios within Glen Tonche, an estate set upon Mount Tonch in the Catskill Mountains, New York. Peart had worked at the studio for his instructional DVD Anatomy of a Drum Solo and convinced Lee and Lifeson to record there over Toronto. The band had initially planned to stay at Allaire for two weeks to record the drums and some bass before returning to Toronto and recording the guitars at Lifeson's home studio, but the positive surroundings, available equipment, and productive sessions led to their stay extended by four weeks, during which the album was completed there. The band would start around 10 a.m. and work until late and would enter the studio at any time if the urge was strong enough, including one session which took place at 2 a.m. Additional recording was done at Grandmaster Recorders in Los Angeles. The album was recorded using Pro Tools software.

Rush were joined by engineer and mixer Richard Chycki, who had worked with Lifeson on the mixes for the R30: 30th Anniversary World Tour DVD and had worked on a re-recording of their 1977 song "Closer to the Heart" for a benefit. The band were impressed with Chycki and chose him to work on Snakes & Arrows. During the writing stage the group sought a new co-producer "for fresh input and new directions". Among the considerations was American musician and producer Nick Raskulinecz, who had worked with Foo Fighters and Velvet Revolver and asked his management to contact the band when he learned that Rush were to make a new album. Initially, he was turned down and was told they had already picked one, but plans fell through and two months later he was chosen. A fan of the band, Raskulinecz's second ever concert was seeing Rush during their Moving Pictures (1981) tour when he was twelve and started work in September 2006 following the group's summer break. He encouraged the band to explore their own limits and to incorporate the complex rhythmic and melodic patterns that characterized their albums from the 1970s. The band gave him the nickname "Booujze" in reference to vocalisations and air drumming that he would make to communicate his drum ideas to Peart, with "booujze" representing a bass drum and cymbal crash that he suggested for a part to "Far Cry". At Raskulinecz's direction, Peart would record a final drum take to the previously recorded guide track alone or record parts with Lee also playing. Other times, he would have the band play at once. When he had a take he was satisfied with, his focus turned to getting the best drum performance.

The album was mixed in almost four weeks in January 2007 at Ocean Way Recording in Los Angeles by Chycki with assistance from Raskulinecz and Scott Moore. It was done using a Neve 88R mixing console. The surroundings suited Peart as the studio was close to his home and enjoyed Lee and Lifeson coming over after travelling far to record with them. The band would leave the studio and play tennis or golf, leaving Chycki and Raskulinecz to assemble a mix for their approval. It was then mastered by Brian Gardner who was assisted by Andrew Alekel and completed some months ahead of schedule.

Lee's main bass guitar on the album is a 1972 Fender Jazz model; at the insistence of Raskulinecz, Lee used his Moog Taurus bass pedals on all but two tracks, the most use since Power Windows (1985). A Mellotron is also used some songs, including "Faithless" and "Good News First", for an orchestral texture. Lifeson uses his semi-acoustic Gibson ES-335, a Gibson Les Paul Goldtop, and a Fender Telecaster as the main guitars on the album, in addition to a custom built Garrison 6- and 12-string specifically made for the album's sessions, a Gibson Jumbo and 12-string acoustic, and a Garrison mandola, mandolin, and bouzouki. Peart performed on a "West Coast" drum kit built by Drum Workshop that he had acquired in early 2006 that was a replica of his stage kit minus the electronic pads. He was so satisfied with the kit, he had them shipped to Toronto for the album's pre-production recordings. After he had finished putting down the drum parts Peart informed Chycki and Raskulinecz that recording for Snakes & Arrows was the most enjoyable of his career and that the results were the most satisfying.

== Songs ==
When Peart was recording his drum parts on "Far Cry", Raskulinecz suggested to solo over the "intricate syncopated" part at the beginning and end of the song. He later said: "Of course the only answer from a drummer is, 'Yes, of course I can,' but I would never have suggested it."

"Armor and Sword" has an opening rhythm that Peart attributes to the Buddy Rich tune "Mercy, Mercy, Mercy", which drummer Dave Weckl had adopted on Peart's tribute album Burning for Buddy and on Test for Echo (1996) by Rush. It features a sample of sheet metal triggered by Peart on his Roland TD-20 kit. The battlefield imagery that had come to Peart while writing its lyrics made him recall a line from "Dover Beach" by English poet Matthew Arnold which excited him due to its synchronicity. As a tribute, Peart included a different line from the poem into the lyric: "Confused alarms of struggle and flight."

"Workin' Them Angels" has Peart shifting between a 3/4 and 4/4 time signature throughout and suggested to have the choruses in 4/4 to take the "lilt" out of the track for a moment. The change forced him to become more creative and devise ways of switching between the two rhythms seamlessly.

"The Larger Bowl" includes Peart playing a real and sampled tambourine. The lyrics include several ideas that Peart had in his rhyming dictionary that had various writing forms and sonnets, including the Malay pantun. He had not bothered to present it to Lee and Lifeson before until he realised that it may "spark a musical echo", which became the song's fifth verse.

"Spindrift" has a reprise of its introduction at the end, which Raskulinecz suggested to follow the false ending and encouraged Peart to "go wild" during the fade-out. According to drummer and lyricist Neil Peart, the lyrics to "Spindrift" use sea-weather imagery as a metaphor for a lover's quarrel.

"The Main Monkey Business" is an instrumental that Peart called "a tour-de-force to write, arrange, and perform," which took more time to put together than some of the other songs on the album combined. It took Peart three days to learn the drum parts, which included triggered samples of a sleigh bell, güiro, and a whistle slowed down that is used only in the third verse. Initially he played the track without a snare drum to create a darker sound which in turn suited its overall atmosphere, but ended up using a piccolo snare during a guitar solo. Its title derived from a quote from Lee's mother in a conversation about a cousin of theirs. It features samples of a tambourine and ethnic percussion sounds triggered by Peart on his Roland TD-20 kit. A mix of the track with just the drums was posted on Peart's website.

"The Way the Wind Blows" is Peart's favorite track on the album from a drumming and listening perspective.

"Hope" is a solo acoustic guitar instrumental written by Lifeson who plays a Garrison AG-400 12-string with D-A-D-A-A-D tuning. The first full take was used for the album and mixing took place straight after the recording. It was recorded in the Great Hall at Allaire with rugs placed on the floor to minimise the high amount of echo that the acoustics provided. He wrote the tune having jammed ideas with various alternate tunings at his home and continued during the writing sessions when Lee worked on vocals, during which he worked on the song. Lifeson was pleased with the track as he had not recorded a solo guitar track for a Rush album for a long time.

For "Faithless", the group made a conscious effort to write and perform a song at a slower tempo than was usual for them. Such a framework gave Peart a fresher approach to how he constructed and placed drum fills. He credits Raskulinecz who suggested to play out the song with a military snare drum roll.

"Malignant Narcissism", the third instrumental, was titled after, and contains a spoken passage from, the comedy film Team America: World Police (2004). Writers Trey Parker and Matt Stone were Rush fans and were pleased with the band's decision to have been inspired to name the track after the film. A screening of the film was organised at Allaire Studios during Thanksgiving holiday as Raskulinecz had not seen it. The track came about after the twelve other songs on the album had been put down and Raskulinecz and Lee were working on vocal tracks. During a respite, Lee started to riff the tune on a fretless Jaco Pastorius bass that Fender had sent to him at Allaire Studios through his endorsement deal. Raskulinecz heard it and recorded through the vocal microphone (this moment was captured on film and appears in the documentary "The Game of Snakes and Arrows" on the album's MVI edition) and later assembled the best parts into a rough track that was finalised as a drum and bass arrangement by Lee and Peart. The guitar parts were added later as Lifeson was in Florida at the time it was put together. Peart had asked his drum technician to pack away his kit but leave four cymbals and four drums for Raskulinecz to "play around on", but ended up recording his drum parts for the track with that basic setup. It was recorded in one day. Peart played with Buddy Rich, Tony Williams, Terry Bozzio, and Steve Gadd in mind.

== Release ==
=== Promotion and formats ===
On March 12, 2007, the band unveiled a new website at the official Rush website, primarily to promote the album. The first single from the album, "Far Cry", was posted as on-demand streaming audio on this site at that time. The band also announced that the single was being released to US and Canadian radio stations. On May 8, 2007, the band announced the release of a video for "Far Cry", and on June 1, 2007, "Spindrift" was released to radio stations as the album's official second single. The third single for the album, "The Larger Bowl" was released June 25 to radio where it positioned within the top 30 of the Mainstream Rock and Media Base Mainstream charts.

Snakes & Arrows is one of the first albums released on Warner Music's MVI (Music Video Interactive) format. This format is a 25,000 copy limited edition. The album comes in a deluxe box, and includes the 13 songs on the album in hi-resolution audio, the entire album in 5.1 surround sound, a 40-minute video documentary on the making of the album, a 26-page booklet (4 pages more than the otherwise identical CD booklet), wallpapers, buddy icons and an exclusive poster for fans that register the MVI copy. After several production delays, the MVI was released on June 26, 2007.

The DVD-ROM portion has 192-kbit/s MP3 files of the entire album. The DVD-Video portion contains both a "high-resolution audio" track (96 kHz/24-bit stereo LPCM) as well as a 5.1 surround-sound track (448 kbit/s Dolby Digital, 48 kHz). There is no DVD-Audio content on the disc.

=== Commercial performance ===
The album debuted at number three on the U.S. Billboard 200, selling about 93,000 copies in its first week.

Professional ratings
Aggregate scores
Source	Rating
Metacritic	73/100
Review scores
Source	Rating
AllMusic	4/5 stars
The Encyclopedia of Popular Music	3/5 stars
IGN	7.5/10
Jam!	3.5/5 stars
Manchester Evening News	2/5 stars
Now	3/5 stars
PopMatters	8/10 stars
Rolling Stone	3/5 stars
The Washington Post	(favorable)

== Tour ==
In promotion of Snakes & Arrows, Rush kicked off their planned intercontinental Snakes & Arrows Tour on June 13, 2007, in Atlanta, Georgia, which ran through October and covered the United States, Canada and Europe. The 2008 leg of the tour started on April 11, 2008, in San Juan, Puerto Rico at José Miguel Agrelot Coliseum and came to a close July 24, 2008, in Noblesville, Indiana.

== Track listing ==
All lyrics are written by Neil Peart; all music is composed by Geddy Lee and Alex Lifeson, except "Hope" by Lifeson.

No.	Title	Length
1.	"Far Cry"	5:21
2.	"Armor and Sword"	6:36
3.	"Workin' Them Angels"	4:47
4.	"The Larger Bowl (A Pantoum)"	4:07
5.	"Spindrift"	5:24
6.	"The Main Monkey Business" (instrumental)	6:01
7.	"The Way the Wind Blows"	6:28
8.	"Hope" (instrumental)	2:03
9.	"Faithless"	5:31
10.	"Bravest Face"	5:12
11.	"Good News First"	4:51
12.	"Malignant Narcissism" (instrumental)	2:17
13.	"We Hold On"	4:13

== Personnel ==
Credits are adapted from the album's liner notes.

Rush

- Neil Peart – drums, electronic percussion, tambourine
- Geddy Lee – bass guitar, keyboards, Mellotron, vocals
- Alex Lifeson – 6 and 12-string acoustic and electric guitars, mandola, mandolin, bouzouki

Additional personnel

- Ben Mink – strings on "Faithless"

Production

- Rush – production, arrangements
- Nick Raskulinecz – production, additional engineering and mixing at Ocean Way Recording, arrangements
- Richard Chycki – engineering, mixing
- Matt Snedecor – assistant engineer at Allaire Studios
- Andrew Alekel – assistant engineer at Grandmaster Recorders
- Scott Moore – assistant engineer at Ocean Way Recording
- Inaam Haq – pre-production assistant at Cherry Beach Studios
- Brian "Big Bass" Gardner – mastering
- Hugh Syme – art direction, design, illustrations
- Harish Johari – cover painting
- Andrew MacNaughtan – band photograph

== Charts ==
2007 weekly chart performance for Snakes & Arrows
Chart (2007)	Peak position
Canadian Albums (Billboard)	3
Dutch Albums (Album Top 100)	16
Finnish Albums (Suomen virallinen lista)	4
German Albums (Offizielle Top 100)	29
Italian Albums (FIMI)	43
Japanese Albums (Oricon)	40
Norwegian Albums (VG-lista)	13
Scottish Albums (Official Charts)	11
Swedish Albums (Sverigetopplistan)	6
UK Albums (Official Charts)	13
UK Rock & Metal Albums (Official Charts)	1
US Billboard 200	3
US Top Hard Rock Albums (Billboard)	22
US Top Rock Albums (Billboard)	1
US Indie Store Album Sales (Billboard)	1

2026 weekly chart performance for Snakes & Arrows
Chart (2026)	Peak position
Hungarian Physical Albums (MAHASZ)	6

== Certifications ==
Region	Certification	Certified units/sales
Canada (Music Canada)	Gold	50,000^{^}
^{^} Shipments figures based on certification alone.
