= Hope (instrumental) =

Instrumental by Rush

from the album Snakes & Arrows
- Released: May 1, 2007
- Genre: Instrumental
- Length: 2:02
- Label: Atlantic
- Composer(s): Alex Lifeson
- Producer(s): Rush; Nick Raskulinecz

Hope is an acoustic instrumental from Rush's 2007 album Snakes & Arrows. It was performed on a twelve-string guitar in D Modal (D-A-D-A-A-D) tuning.

== Background ==
"Hope" is one of the three instrumentals on the Rush album Snakes & Arrows. According to Neil Peart, the title of the instrumental was inspired by the chorus of the ninth Snakes & Arrows track "Faithless", which contains the word "Hope". It is the band's second shortest studio-album-song, clocking in at 2 minutes 2 seconds. Unusual for Rush's compositions, the song was written by Alex Lifeson alone. It is played on a twelve-string guitar and was recorded in two takes. The second take was "just for the heck of it".

A live version of "Hope" was nominated for a Grammy Award, which appeared on the compilation disc Songs for Tibet. The song was recorded on May 25, 2008, in Regina, Saskatchewan, Canada.

== See also ==
- List of Rush songs
- List of Rush instrumentals
