= Malignant Narcissism (song) =

Instrumental by Rush

from the album Snakes & Arrows
- Released: May 1, 2007
- Genre: Progressive rock, hard rock, instrumental rock
- Length: 2:17
- Label: Atlantic
- Songwriters: Alex Lifeson, Geddy Lee
- Producers: Rush and Nick Raskulinecz

Malignant Narcissism is an instrumental track from Rush's 2007 album Snakes & Arrows. "Malignant Narcissism" was nominated for a 2008 Grammy under the category of Best Rock Instrumental Performance, Rush's fifth nomination in said category. However, the song lost to Bruce Springsteen's "Once Upon a Time in the West" making it their fifth defeat in that category.

== Song title inspiration ==
The band found inspiration for the title of the song in the dialogue from the Trey Parker and Matt Stone film Team America: World Police. In that film, the psychological term malignant narcissism is used in reference to Islamic terrorists. The only voice heard is from an audio sample taken from the film, appearing at 1:08 in the song featuring a female voice saying, "Usually a case of malignant narcissism brought on during childhood".

We’re all big Matt Stone fans, and South Park fans, so we were all fans of that movie, and [Rush drummer-lyricist] Neil [Peart] is friends with Matt Stone. And Matt and Trey Parker were both Rush fans at some point. So they keep in contact. And [Neil] said, ‘Look, we want to do this song called "Malignant Narcissism", and [Matt] was thrilled. He said, ‘Great!’

— Rush bassist/vocalist Geddy Lee

== Composition and production ==
Bassist/vocalist Geddy Lee describes the development of the song in an interview with Toronto rock station Q107 (CILQ-FM). "Malignant Narcissism" was the last song recorded during the production of Snakes & Arrows, and was completed in a few days. While guitarist Alex Lifeson was away from the studio, Lee contacted Fender Musical Instruments Corporation and requested a Jaco Pastorius signature fretless bass delivered to the studio, on evaluation from Fender. According to Lee, he was interested in the bass for several reasons, including his lack of familiarity with fretless basses.

While Lee was experimenting with the bass in the studio, co-producer Nick Raskulinecz overheard Lee playing a catchy riff and suggested this be incorporated into a new song (this exchange was captured on film, and is part of the documentary section of the MVI edition of Snakes & Arrows). Rush drummer Neil Peart was present, but his expansive drum kit had already been shipped off from the studio. With Raskulinecz's encouragement, Peart decided to challenge himself with an unfamiliar instrument setup, like Lee had done with fretless bass. Peart assembled a small kit composed of four drums, the smallest kit he had ever used when recording for a Rush album. Peart recorded drum parts for "Malignant Narcissism" with this minimal kit. Like Lee's bassline, the opening drumming of counting off on the snare rim, was also a bit of a fluke. As Neil Peart describes in a 2007 Modern Drummer article, "Booujze heard me counting off the tempo on my snare rim, and wanted me to start the song like that".

When Lifeson returned to the studio, he had one day to compose a guitar part to play over Lee's fretless riffing, which he did. The piece was added to the nearly finished album, thus making Snakes & Arrows the first Rush album to contain more than one instrumental, this album ending up with three.

== See also ==
- List of Rush songs
- List of Rush instrumentals
