= Pantun =

Malay poetic form

- Medium: Oral poetry
- Originating culture: Malayic

Pantun
- UNESCO Intangible Cultural Heritage
- Country: Brunei, Indonesia, and Malaysia
- Reference: 02274
- Region: Asia and the Pacific

Inscription history
- Inscription: 2025 (20th session)
- List: Representative

Pantun (Arab Melayu: ڤنتون) is a Malayic oral poetic form used to express intricate ideas and emotions. It generally consists of an even number of lines and is based on $\mathrm{ABAB}$ rhyming schemes. The shortest pantun consists of two lines, known as the pantun dua kerat in Malay, while the longest, the pantun enam belas kerat, can have 16 lines.

Pantun is a disjunctive form of poetry that always comes in two parts: the first part is a prefatory statement called pembayang or sampiran which has no immediate logical or narrative connection with the second or closing statement called maksud or isi. However, they are always connected by rhyme and other verbal associations, such as puns and repeating sounds. There is also an oblique but necessary relationship, and the first statement often serves as a metaphor for the second. The most popular forms of pantun are the quatrain (four lines) and the couplet (two lines), which both feature prominently in literature and modern popular culture.

The earliest literary records of pantun date back to the 15th century Malacca Sultanate, although some historians believe that pantun may be as old as, or even precede, Classical Malay itself, having grown and spread during the Srivijaya era, from which the founder of Malacca originated. Pantun during the Malacca era was featured in the most important Malay literary text, the Malay Annals, and is regarded as a high art integral to classical Malay literature. It also thrived naturally in the daily communication of traditional Malay society and served as an important expressive tool in Malay songs, rituals, performing arts, and all forms of storytelling.

== Etymology ==
According to Za'aba, the word pantun is thought to have evolved from the Malay word sepantun (Jawi: سڤنتون), meaning 'same as'. This word is used to signify a proverbial metaphor or simile, a type of figure of speech commonly found in traditional pantun or proverbs from classical Malay literature. The archaic meaning of *pantun* in Malay also refers to a form of proverb used for indirect references, which has a similar role to pantun as poetry, still generally created in styles portraying sindir (indirect references) and kias (analogies).

Another theory suggests that pantun originated from the word penuntun ('guider'), from the noun-building prefix pe(n) and the verb tuntun (Jawi: تونتون) or 'to guide'. Alternatively, Brandstetter suggested that the word originates from tun and its similar sounding variants in Austronesian languages, with multiple meanings: Kapampangan tuntun ('well organized'), Tagalog tonton ('skillful arrangement'), Old Javanese tuntun ('thread'), atuntun ('well arranged'), matuntun ('to lead'), and Toba Batak pantun ('polite' or 'worthy of respect'). Winstedt supported this opinion, noting that in many Austronesian languages, words suggesting 'something set out in rows' gradually acquired the new meaning of 'well-arranged words', in prose or in poetry. Ari Welianto suggested that pantun originated from the Minangkabau word patuntun, which means "guide".

Linguist Tom Hoogervorst proposes that pantun may have been derived from a fossilized form of Old Javanese parik meaning "together" suffixed with -ntən indicating a formal (krama) register corresponding to Malay -ntan or the Banjarese -ntang.

== History ==
Some scholars believe that pantuns predates literacy and may be as old as the Malay language itself. Muhammad Haji Salleh believes that the pantuns form grew and spread from Srivijaya, most probably from around the cities of Palembang or the Malayu. As Palembang became more dominant, the pantuns of the two cities would have been known to each other's populations, despite their political rivalry, as they used the same language. Nevertheless, the tradition is known to have reached its refined form with the flowering of classical Malay literature from the 15th century. Notable literary works like the Malay Annals and Hikayat Hang Tuah contain the earliest written examples of pantun.

For at least 500 years, pantun spread through Malay language tranmission via trade routes, ports, and migrations, becoming the most dynamic single literary form. Today, it is known in at least 40 dialects of Malay and 35 non-Malay languages in the Malay Peninsula and many islands of Maritime Southeast Asia. The popularity of pantun among hybrid communities like the Peranakans, Chitty, and Kristang people, signifies its prominent position as a cultural symbol in the Malay world. A type of pantun called pantun berkait, consisting of interwoven quatrains, was introduced to Western poetry in the 19th century by Ernest Fouinet and later popularised by Victor Hugo, forming the basis of the modern pantoum.

== Tradition ==
The pantun originated as a traditional oral form of expression, manifesting the traditional Malay's views of life and their surroundings, and utilized to express a wide range of emotions and ideas. As a symbol of Malay identity, pantuns are seen as reflections of adat ('customs') and adab ('manners'). As Malay culture emphasizes polite and indirect expressions, pantun are generally created using various forms of figurative language. Elements of metaphors, similes, symbols, personifications, eponyms, allusions, idioms, and proverbs are abundant in the elegantly compacted Malay pantuns.

In Malay culture, pantun is an important instrument of communication in various social, cultural, and economic activities. It is traditionally used to express feelings, give advice, exchange quizzes, and sweeten conversations. For example, pantuns are used in the customary verbal exchange in a Malay wedding (or engagement) ceremony, especially as part of the culturally sanctioned greetings between representatives of the bridegroom and bride upon arrival at the bride's house. As an expressive tool, pantuns are also used extensively in the lyrics of traditional Malay songs tuned to popular rhythms like Zapin, Inang, and Joget. Other notable applications of pantuns can be found as a structural support for art performances like Dondang sayang, Bangsawan, Mak yong, Mek Mulung, and Dikir barat. The skill in performing these poems lies in reciting them in a way that suggests singing while simultaneously demonstrating the ability to engage in quick, witty, and subtle dialogue.

Outside Malay-populated areas of the Indonesian archipelago, there are the kentrung traditions of central and eastern Java using structures similar to the pantun (called parikan) to recount religious or local historical tales to the accompaniment of a drum. Records from linguists in the early 20th century like Hans Frederich Overbeck and Joannes Jacobus De Hollander have no mention of this artform, so that appears to be a newer adaptation coming later after their period. Indeed, much of Indonesia's traditional literature forms the foundation of complex mixed-genre performances, such as the Randai of the Minangkabau of western Sumatra, which blends instrumental music, dance, drama, and martial arts in ceremonial settings.

== Description ==
In its most basic form, the pantun consists of a quatrain employing an ABAB rhyme scheme. A pantun is traditionally recited according to a fixed rhythm; as a rule of thumb, to maintain the rhythm, every line should contain between eight and 12 syllables. According to Katharine Sim, "The pantun is a four-lined verse consisting of alternating, roughly rhyming lines. The first and second lines sometimes appear completely disconnected in meaning from the third and fourth, but there is almost invariably a link of some sort. Whether it be a mere association of ideas, or of feeling, expressed through assonance or through the faintest nuance of thought, it is nearly always traceable" (Sim, page 12). The pantun is highly allusive, and to understand it, readers generally need to know the traditional meaning of the symbols the poem employs. An example (followed by a translation by Katharine Sim):

Tanam selasih di tengah padang,
Sudah bertangkai diurung semut,
Kita kasih orang tak sayang,
Halai-balai tempurung hanyut.

I planted sweet basil in mid-field
Grown, it swarmed with ants,
I loved but am not loved,
I am all confused and helpless.

According to Sim, halai-Balai tempurung hanyut literally means 'a floating coconut shell at sixes and sevens'. Selasih ('sweet basil') implies 'lover' because it rhymes with the word for that, kekasih. Other frequently recurring symbols are the flower and the bee, indicating a girl and her lover, the squirrel (tupai) implying a seducer, and the water hyacinth (bunga kiambang) meaning love that will not take root. The pantun often makes use of proverbs as well as geographical and historical allusions, for example, the following poem by Munshi Abdullah:

Singapura negeri baharu,
Tuan Raffles menjadi raja,
Bunga melur, cempaka biru,
Kembang sekuntum di mulut naga.

Singapore is a new country,
Tuan Raffles has become its lord,
Chinese jasmine, purple magnolia,
A burgeon of flower in the dragon's mouth.

This alludes to the foundation of Singapore in 1819 by Sir Stamford Raffles: Sim suggests the "flower on the dragon's mouth" an allusion to Raffles's wife, Olivia Mariamne Devenish protected under Stamford's own power.

Sometimes a pantun may consist of a series of interwoven quatrains, in which case it is known as a pantun berkait. This follows the $\mathrm{ABAB}$ rhyme scheme, with the second and fourth lines of each stanza becoming the first and third lines of the following stanza. Finally, the first and third lines of the first stanza become the second and fourth lines of the last stanza, usually in reverse order, so that the first and last lines of the poem are identical. This form of pantun has exercised the most influence on Western literature, where it is known as the pantoum.

== See also ==
- Pantoum
- Gurindam
- Hainteny
- Sisindiran
- Syair

== Sources ==
- Daillie, Francois-Rene (1988). Alam Pantun Melayu: Studies on the Malay pantun. Dewan Bahasa dan Pustaka. ISBN 978-9836203106.
- Ding, Choo Ming (2008). "The Role of Pantun as Cultural Identity for Nusantara in 21st Century and Beyond". Southeast Asia Journal. 18 (2).
- Harun Mat Piah (2007). Pantun Melayu : bingkisan permata. Yayasan Karyawan. ISBN 978-9814459884.
- Hirsch, Edward (2014). A Poet's Glossary. Houghton Mifflin Harcourt. ISBN 978-0151011957.
- Kassim Ahmad (1966). Characterisation in Hikayat Hang Tuah: A General Survey of Methods of Character-portrayal and Analysis and Interpretation of the Characters of Hang Tuah and Hang Jebat. Kuala Lumpur: Dewan Bahasa dan Pustaka, Kementerian Pelajaran Malaysia.
- Liaw, Yock Fang (2013). A History of Classical Malay Literature. ISEAS-Yusof Ishak Institute. ISBN 978-9814459884.
- Matusky, Patricia; Tan, Sooi Beng (2004), The Music of Malaysia: The Classical, Folk and Syncretic Traditions, Routledge, ISBN 978-0754608318
- Abels, Birgit (2011). Austronesian soundscapes : performing arts in Oceania and Southeast Asia. Amsterdam University Press. ISBN 978-9089640857.
- Muhammad Haji Salleh (2011). "Sailing the Archipelago in a boat of rhymes: Pantun in the Malay world". Wacana. 13 (1).
- Muhammad Haji Salleh (2018). Pantun: The poetry of passion. University of Malaya Press. ISBN 9789831009765.
- Overbeck, Hans Friedrich (1922). "The Malay Pantun". Journal of the Straits Branch of the Royal Asiatic Society. 85. Malaysian Branch of the Royal Asiatic Society.
- Sim, Katharine (1987). More than a Pantun: Understanding Malay Verse. Singapore: Times Publishing International.
- Wilkinson, R. J. (1908). Papers on Malay subjects : Life and Customs. 1. Kuala Lumpur: F.M.S. Govt. Press. Archived from the original on 2022-05-27.
- Winstedt, Richard Olaf (1969). A history of classical Malay literature. Oxford University Press. ASIN B0006CJ8PU.
- Wright, Arnold (1908). Twentieth Century Impressions of British Malaya: Its History, People, Commerce, Industries, and Resources. Lloyd's Greater Britain Publishing Company. Archived from the original on April 22, 2021.
- Za'aba (1962). Ilmu Mengarang Melayu (Malay Writing Skills). Dewan Bahasa dan Pustaka.
- Tengku Ritawati (2018). "Pantun in The Text of Nyanyian Lagu Melayu Asli". Harmonia: Journal of Arts Research and Education. 18 (1). Department of Education Drama, Dance and Music, Universitas Islam Riau, Indonesia.
