= The Larger Bowl (A Pantoum) =

Promotional single by Rush

from the album Snakes & Arrows
- Released: June 25, 2007
- Genre: Progressive rock, hard rock
- Length: 4:07
- Label: Atlantic
- Songwriter(s): Lifeson/Lee/Peart
- Producer(s): Rush & Nick Raskulinecz

Rush singles chronology
"Spindrift" (2007)	"The Larger Bowl" (2007)	"Caravan" (2010)

"The Larger Bowl" is the fourth track and third single from Rush's 2007 album Snakes & Arrows.

== Inspiration and lyrical structure ==
The lyrics were written by the drummer and primary lyricist Neil Peart. The title was inspired by a "dysentery dream" he had while touring West Africa on his bicycle in 1988.

Peart's book The Masked Rider: Cycling in West Africa includes a chapter entitled "The Larger Bowl" in which he describes the dream. The excerpt in which he mentions the song is as follows:

Anyway... a song was playing in the store, a plaintive ballad called "The Larger Bowl." Something about loneliness and the misfortunes of life, I recall. No such song as far as I know, but I like the title.

In the early 1990s, Peart put words to the title. The song is written in the form of a pantoum.

== See also ==
- List of Rush songs
