= A Passage to Bangkok =

Song by Rush

from the album 2112
- Released: March 1976
- Studio: Toronto Sound (Toronto)
- Genre: Hard rock; progressive rock
- Length: 3:34
- Label: Anthem
- Composers: Geddy Lee; Alex Lifeson
- Lyricist: Neil Peart
- Producers: Rush; Terry Brown

Lyric video
- "A Passage to Bangkok" on YouTube

"A Passage to Bangkok" is a song by Canadian rock band Rush, released in March 1976 by Anthem Records. The song appears on the band's fourth studio album 2112 (1976). With the album's title track comprising the first half of the record, "A Passage to Bangkok" opens the second side of the album (on the original LP and audio cassette).

== Composition ==
The song is in the key of E minor and is played in 4/4 time.

Guitarist Alex Lifeson said in 2009 that the Led Zeppelin song "Kashmir" inspired "A Passage to Bangkok".

== Lyrics ==
The song's lyrics, written by drummer Neil Peart, are widely interpreted as describing drug tourism; more specifically, it refers to cannabis tourism. The lyrics employ innuendo, eschewing naming any actual drugs. The song describes visiting Colombia, Mexico, Jamaica, Morocco, Thailand, Afghanistan, "golden Acapulco nights" (a reference to Acapulco Gold), Nepal, and Lebanon. Mention is made of "smoke rings", "pipe dreams", various fragrances, and welcoming natives who "pass along" their unspecified "yield".

Lifeson said:

This piece is about a fun little journey to all the good places you could go to have a puff. We thought it would be kind of fun to write a song about that, and Neil did it in a very eloquent way, I think. That song was probably written in a farmhouse, on an acoustic guitar, in front of a little cassette player of some sort. We would record like that and then go down in the basement and rehearse it.

In the documentary Classic Albums Presents the Making of 2112 & Moving Pictures (2010), Peart states the intent was to be "light in tone and write some funny songs" when discussing "A Passage to Bangkok". In the film, Foo Fighters drummer Taylor Hawkins, Rush producer Terry Brown, and Peart explain and demonstrate the subtleties in the song that make it a tongue-in-cheek reference to drug use in the 1970s.

== Reception ==
Ultimate Classic Rock ranked "A Passage to Bangkok" number 16 on their list of "All 167 Rush Songs Ranked Worst to Best", writing that it is "one of the sharpest vocal melodies the band wrote pre-1980, and it's a load of fun as a lyric". They thought it was the best song on 2112.

Greg Prato of AllMusic chose "A Passage to Bangkok" as one of the album's highlights.

== Personnel ==
- Geddy Lee – vocals, bass
- Alex Lifeson – guitars
- Neil Peart – drums
