= Limelight (song) =

Rush song

Single by Rush

from the album Moving Pictures
- B-side: "YYZ"
- Released: February 25, 1981
- Recorded: October – November 1980
- Studio: Le Studio, Morin Heights, Quebec
- Genre: Arena rock; hard rock
- Length: 4:19
- Label: Mercury
- Songwriters: Geddy Lee; Alex Lifeson; Neil Peart
- Producers: Rush; Terry Brown

Rush singles chronology
| "Entre Nous" (1980) | "Limelight" (1981) | "Vital Signs" (1981) |

Audio sample
- file; help

Music video
- "Limelight" on YouTube

"Limelight" is a song by Canadian progressive rock band Rush. It first appeared on the 1981 album Moving Pictures. The song's lyrics were written by Neil Peart with music written by Geddy Lee and Alex Lifeson. "Limelight" expresses Peart's discomfort with Rush's success and the resulting attention from the public. The song paraphrases the opening lines of the "All the world's a stage" speech from William Shakespeare's play As You Like It. The band had previously used the phrase for its 1976 live album. The lyrics also refer to "the camera eye", the title of the song that follows on the Moving Pictures album.

Released as the lead single from the album in February 1981, it charted at No. 4 on the U.S. Billboard Top Tracks chart and No. 55 on the U.S. Billboard Hot 100, and remains one of Rush's most popular songs commercially. "Limelight" was one of five Rush songs inducted into the Canadian Songwriters Hall of Fame on March 28, 2010. It was listed at No. 435 on Rolling Stone's "Top 500 Greatest Songs of All Time" in 2021. Lifeson's guitar solo in "Limelight" was also listed as Guitar World's 26th greatest guitar solo of all time.

== Background ==
In "Limelight", lyricist Neil Peart comments on the band's commercial success and the fame and its demands that come with rock star status. According to guitarist Alex Lifeson, the song is about "being under the microscopic scrutiny and the need for privacy—trying to separate the two and not always being successful at it". Bassist Geddy Lee describes the motivation for "Limelight" in a 1988 interview:

"Limelight" was probably more of Neil's song than a lot of the songs on that album in the sense that his feelings about being in the limelight and his difficulty with coming to grips with fame and autograph seekers and a sudden lack of privacy and sudden demands on his time [that] he was having a very difficult time dealing with. I mean we all were, but I think he was having the most difficulty of the three of us adjusting; in the sense that I think he's more sensitive to more things than Alex [Lifeson] and I are. It's difficult for him to deal with those interruptions on his personal space and his desire to be alone. Being very much a person who needs that solitude, to have someone coming up to you constantly and asking for your autograph is a major interruption in your own little world.

In a 2007 interview, Alex Lifeson gives his take on "Limelight":

It's funny: after all these years, the solo to "Limelight" is my favourite to play live. There's something very sad and lonely about it; it exists in its own little world. And I think, in its own way, it reflects the nature of the song's lyrics—feeling isolated amidst chaos and adulation.

== Recording and live performance ==
Lifeson's guitar solo was performed on what he called a "Hentor Sportscaster", a modified Fender Stratocaster equipped with a Floyd Rose vibrato arm. Critics frequently point out Lifeson's use of vibrato in the solo, with Max Mobley writing that it "is dripping with Floyd Rose whammy". "Limelight" has been described as Lifeson's "signature song", and critics cite the influence of Allan Holdsworth. Lifeson himself calls it his favourite solo.

The song was a staple of Rush's live performances, having been played on every tour since its release, up until the Grace Under Pressure Tour, when it was removed. It was then brought back for the following two tours, and was then removed again for the Presto Tour. It was then put back in all further tour setlists, until the R40 Live Tour.

Billy Talent released a cover of the song in 2025 for Prime Monday Night Hockey.

== Critical reception ==
Record World said that its "buzzsaw guitar and vocal dynamics" should appeal to pop radio. Cashbox identified "Limelight" as one of the "top cuts" from Moving Pictures.

== Personnel ==
=== Rush ===
- Geddy Lee – bass, vocals, synthesizers
- Alex Lifeson – electric and acoustic guitars
- Neil Peart – drums, percussion

=== Production ===
- Rush
- Terry Brown

== Chart performance ==
=== Weekly charts ===
Weekly chart performance for "Limelight"
| Chart (1981) | Peak position |
|---|---|
| Canada Top Singles (RPM) | 18 |
| Canada (CHUM) | 6 |
| US Billboard Hot 100 | 55 |
| US Mainstream Rock (Billboard) | 4 |

=== Year-end charts ===
| Chart (1981) | Position |
|---|---|
| Canada Top Singles (RPM) | 75 |

== In popular culture ==
- The song was featured in the films Sonny, Used Cars, That's My Boy, I Love You, Man, and Fanboys. The latter two films also feature the song "Tom Sawyer".
- Both a cover and the original version of the song are available as downloadable tracks for the music video game series Rock Band, the latter being bundled with the rest of the Moving Pictures album. It is also playable in Guitar Hero: Warriors of Rock and Guitar Hero Live.
- Upon the band's entrance into the Rock and Roll Hall of Fame, a slightly edited version of the song was used in the intro for CBC's Hockey Night in Canada on April 20, 2013.
- In an episode of the USA Network sitcom Playing House ("Drumline", Season 1, Episode 5), "Limelight" plays over the last scene.

== See also ==
- List of Rush songs
