= Natural Science (song) =

- Neil Peart's handwritten lyrics sheet for "Natural Science"

Song by Rush

from the album Permanent Waves
- Released: 14 January 1980
- Recorded: 1979
- Studio: Le Studio (Quebec)
- Genre: Progressive rock; hard rock
- Length: 9:20
- Label: Mercury
- Composers: Geddy Lee; Alex Lifeson
- Lyricist: Neil Peart
- Producers: Rush; Terry Brown

Rush suite chronology
"La Villa Strangiato" (1978)	"Natural Science" (1980)	"The Camera Eye" (1981)

"Natural Science" is a suite of three movements ("Tide Pools", "Hyperspace" and "Permanent Waves") by the Canadian rock band Rush. It was released as the final track on their 1980 album, Permanent Waves.

== Background ==
Guitarist Alex Lifeson said:

Once we had the guitar track down, we stuck a speaker cabinet outside—this was up at the studio in Morin Heights, Quebec—and we recorded the natural echo off the mountains in combination with the sound of splashing water and Geddy's voice. We didn't use any sort of synthetic echo on the water track.

== Parts ==
No.	Title	Starts at (approx.)	Length
1.	"Tide Pools"	0:00	2:18
2.	"Hyperspace"	2:19	2:49
3.	"Permanent Waves"	5:09	4:08
Total length:			9:20
