= Between the Wheels =

Song by Rush

from the album Grace Under Pressure
- Released: 12 April 1984
- Genre: Progressive rock; new wave
- Length: 5:44
- Label: Anthem
- Composer(s): Geddy Lee; Alex Lifeson
- Lyricist(s): Neil Peart
- Producer(s): Rush; Peter Henderson

Grace Under Pressure track listing
- 8 tracks Side one: 1. "Distant Early Warning"; 2. "Afterimage"; 3. "Red Sector A"; 4. "The Enemy Within"; Side two: 1. "The Body Electric"; 2. "Kid Gloves"; 3. "Red Lenses"; 4. "Between the Wheels"

"Between the Wheels" is a song by the Canadian rock band Rush. It was released on their 1984 album Grace Under Pressure.

== Composition and recording ==
"Between the Wheels" was composed in the key of D minor, and is played in common time.

News stories from the Toronto-based newspaper The Globe and Mail inspired the song's lyrics.

The line "Another lost generation" is from a quote by Gertrude Stein used by Ernest Hemingway at the beginning of The Sun Also Rises.

Bill Banasiewicz in the book Rush Visions said:

"Between the Wheels" is about pressure, and returns to the gloom of much of the rest of Grace Under Pressure. Alex's guitar really jumps out. A lyric from the song puts across what they all must have felt at the time. "We can go from boom to bust . . . from dreams to a bowl of dust".

== Reception ==
Ultimate Classic Rock ranked the song number 80 on their list of "All 167 Rush Songs Ranked Worst to Best", writing "there's nothing wrong with 'Between the Wheels', but it's hard to shake the feeling that Rush – and, well, other bands – have presented this same song more effectively in the past".

Louder ranked the song number 47 on their list of the top 50 Rush songs.
