= Grace Under Pressure (Rush album) =

1984 album by Rush

Studio album by Rush
- Released: April 12, 1984
- Recorded: November 1983 – March 1984
- Studios: Le Studio, Morin-Heights, Quebec
- Genres: Progressive rock; new wave; synth rock
- Length: 39:23
- Label: Anthem
- Producers: Rush; Peter Henderson

Rush chronology
Signals (1982)	Grace Under Pressure (1984)	Power Windows (1985)

Singles from Grace Under Pressure
- 1. "Distant Early Warning" Released: April 1984; 2. "The Body Electric" Released: May 1984 (UK); 3. "Red Sector A" Released: May 1984 (Can); 4. "Afterimage" Released: May 1984 (Japan)

Grace Under Pressure is the tenth studio album by Canadian rock band Rush, released April 12, 1984, on Anthem Records. After touring for the band's previous album, Signals (1982), came to an end in mid-1983, Rush started work on a follow-up in August. The band had decided not to work with longtime producer Terry Brown, who had collaborated with Rush since 1974. The new material accentuated the group's change in direction towards a synthesizer-oriented sound like its previous album. After some difficulty finding a suitable producer who could commit, the album was recorded with Peter Henderson.

Grace Under Pressure reached number 4 in Canada, number 5 in the UK, and number 10 on the U.S. Billboard 200. It was certified platinum in the U.S. for selling one million copies.

== Background and recording ==
In July 1983, Rush ended their 1982–1983 tour of North America and the UK in support of their previous album, Signals (1982). The group reconvened in mid-August to write and rehearse new material for a follow-up in a lodge in Horseshoe Valley in Barrie, Ontario. The sessions were productive, partly due to the set amount of time they gave themselves to work in and that studio time had already been booked. The band adopted its usual working method of Geddy Lee and Alex Lifeson working on music while Neil Peart worked on lyrics. News stories from the Toronto-based newspaper The Globe and Mail inspired some of the lyrics on the album, particularly "Distant Early Warning," "Red Lenses" and "Between the Wheels." Peart wrote that they came up with "Between the Wheels" on the first night and, after a few days, "Kid Gloves" and "Afterimage." In three weeks, the group had assembled a demo tape of the aforementioned tracks along with "Red Sector A" and "The Body Electric." Development then paused in September 1983 while Rush performed five nights at Radio City Music Hall in New York City, after which the band resumed album rehearsals.

Grace Under Pressure is the first Rush album that was not produced by Terry Brown since their self-titled debut effort. During the Signals tour in March 1983, Rush met with Brown in Miami to inform him that the band had decided to work with a different producer. The group wished to explore different approaches and techniques that someone else might offer which in turn would develop their sound but stressed that the change did not suggest any dissatisfaction in Brown's production. Peart recalled that the split was tough for both parties considering the length of time they had worked together, but that they split on good terms. Brown receives a tribute in the liner notes of Grace Under Pressure in French which translates to "And always our good old friend."

The search for a new producer began during Rush's 1983 European tour, where the band met several candidates during their visit to the UK. They met Steve Lillywhite, who initially agreed to the project, but he backed out two weeks before the band was to start rehearsing, as he had decided to work with Simple Minds instead. They had producer Trevor Horn and Yes bassist Chris Squire attend their concert at Wembley Arena with the prospect of choosing one of them to produce. Eventually, the group started pre-production alone, which Peart thought increased the band's desire to succeed: "This really drew us together and gave us a strong resolve and a mutual determination to make a really great record." Rush then met with another English producer during rehearsals who showed promise, but various problems that hindered his availability could not be solved in time. This was followed by the arrival of Englishman Peter Henderson, who the band liked and who agreed to produce and engineer, but his occasional indecisiveness ultimately left the band to handle the majority of the creative decisions themselves. Despite this, Rush and Henderson are credited as co-producers in the liner notes.

After a collection of demos had been worked out, the group entered Le Studio in Morin-Heights, Quebec to record, from November 1983 to March 1984, the longest period Rush had taken to record an album up to this point. It took two months to record all the basic tracks, and a further two for guitar, keyboards, vocals and percussion overdubs. The band spent up to 14 hours per day in the studio. In a 1984 interview, Lifeson picked Grace Under Pressure as the "most satisfying of all our records."

The album's title was inspired by a quotation from American novelist Ernest Hemingway. Peart was an avid reader and admirer of Hemingway, and liked the quotation "courage is grace under pressure" as he thought the quote reflected the ambient mood of the album's recording sessions.

A music video produced for "The Enemy Within" would be the first played by the Canadian music television channel MuchMusic, which launched in August 1984. Videos were also produced for "Distant Early Warning," "Afterimage," and "The Body Electric".

== Music ==
The album marks yet another development in Rush's sound; while continuing to make extensive use of keyboard synthesizers as on Signals, the band also experimented by incorporating elements of ska and reggae into some of the songs. The guitars played a larger role on this record than on Signals, with Lifeson stating, "I think the guitar on Signals took a bit of a back seat. The keyboards were really upfront ... though in a sense that's what we were trying to achieve, we wanted to go for a different perspective on the whole sound. But, possibly, we lost direction at times on Signals." Lifeson also pointed out that there is no acoustic guitar on Grace Under Pressure and the lack of ballad-type songs.

=== Songs ===
"Afterimage" was written about Robbie Whelan, a tape operator at Le Studio who was killed in a car accident a year prior to the album's release. The album was dedicated to his memory.

"Red Sector A" talks about the Holocaust imprisonment camps that were set up during World War II, specifically from the perspective of an unspecified person in the camp. Lyricist Neil Peart has stated that the detailed imagery in the song intentionally evokes concentration camps of the Holocaust, although he left the lyrics ambiguous enough that they could deal with any similar prison camp scenario. The song was inspired in part by Geddy Lee's mother's accounts of the Holocaust.

"The Body Electric" features a guitar solo with an added harmonizing effect with a delay which Lifeson described as "pretty bizarre."

== Tour ==
The band went on tour for the album from May to November in 1984. In addition, they performed at the Radio City Music Hall in New York, New York during September 1983 as a warm-up tour. During the 1984 tour, a setlist was made that included every song from the album, with "Afterimage" being swapped occasionally for "Kid Gloves". A performance at the Maple Leaf Gardens in Toronto was filmed and released as Grace Under Pressure Tour on home video in 1986. It was later released on Laserdisc, then remastered to DVD in 2006 and incorporated into the Replay X 3 box set. It has since been marketed by itself as both a DVD and CD. This was also the only tour in which (what was then) the "Fear" trilogy was played in full, which included "The Enemy Within," "The Weapon," and "Witch Hunt."

== Artwork ==
The cover was designed and painted by Hugh Syme, the creator of all Rush album cover artwork since 1975. The back cover features a band portrait by Armenian-Canadian photographer Yousuf Karsh. The group had decided to employ Karsh when they discussed ideas for the album's sleeve during rehearsals in Horseshoe Valley. Lifeson suggested to Peart a black-and-white band photograph, as the band had not done something like that on previous albums. Lee was enthusiastic towards the idea and suggested to use Karsh. Lifeson spoke of the end result: "It's definitely not a rock 'n' roll picture, but it's a very true, realistic picture of the three of us." The original vinyl pressing also featured a photo depicting an egg being held in a C-clamp.

== Release and reception ==
Professional ratings
Review scores
Source	Rating
AllMusic	3/5 stars
The Daily Vault	A−
The Encyclopedia of Popular Music	2/5 stars
The Essential Rock Discography	5/10
MusicHound Rock	1/5 stars
Rolling Stone	3/5 stars
The Rolling Stone Album Guide	2.5/5 stars
Uncut	4/5 stars
The Virgin Encyclopedia of 80s Music	2/5 stars

Grace Under Pressure was released in April 1984. It reached No. 4 in Canada, No. 5 in the UK, and No. 10 on the U.S. Billboard 200. It was certified platinum in the U.S. for selling one million copies.

Guitar World magazine placed the album on their list of "New Sensations: 50 Iconic Albums That Defined 1984".

== Reissues ==
Year	Label	Format	Notes
2015	Mercury	CD, LP, digital	Digitally remastered, 200 g audiophile vinyl. Also available in 24-bit/96 kHz and 24-bit/192 kHz digital formats.
March 13, 2026	Mercury	CD, LP, digital, Blu-Ray, box set	Super Deluxe Edition with 4xCD with a 2025 mix by Terry Brown and a Blu-Ray disc. Released in Japan on April 8, 2026.

== Track listing ==
All lyrics are written by Neil Peart; all music is composed by Geddy Lee and Alex Lifeson.

Side one
No.	Title	Length
1.	"Distant Early Warning"	4:45
2.	"Afterimage"	5:00
3.	"Red Sector A"	5:08
4.	"The Enemy Within" (Part I of "Fear")	4:33

Side two
No.	Title	Length
1.	"The Body Electric"	4:58
2.	"Kid Gloves"	4:16
3.	"Red Lenses"	4:39
4.	"Between the Wheels"	5:36

== Personnel ==
Rush

- Geddy Lee – bass, synthesizers, vocals
- Alex Lifeson – guitars, synthesizers
- Neil Peart – drums, percussion, electronic percussion

Production

- Rush – production, arrangements
- Peter Henderson – production, engineer, mixing
- Frank Opolko – assistant engineer
- Robert Di Gioia – assistant engineer
- Jon Erikson – pre-production engineer
- Paul Northfield – PPG synthesizer programming assistance
- Jim Burgess – PPG synthesizer programming assistance
- Bob Ludwig at Masterdisk – original mastering
- Yousuf Karsh – portrait
- Hugh Syme – art direction, cover painting
- Ray Danniels, SRO Productions – management
- Moon Records – executive production

== Charts ==
=== Weekly charts ===
Chart (1984)	Peak position
Canada Top Albums/CDs (RPM)	4
Dutch Albums (Album Top 100)	27
European Albums (European Top 100 Albums)	24
Finnish Albums (Suomen virallinen lista)	14
German Albums (Offizielle Top 100)	43
Swedish Albums (Sverigetopplistan)	18
UK Albums (Official Charts)	5
US Billboard 200	10

Chart (2026)	Peak position
German Rock & Metal Albums (Offizielle Top 100)	20

=== Year-end charts ===
Chart (1984)	Position
Canada Top Albums/CDs (RPM)	22

== Certifications ==
Region	Certification	Certified units/sales
Canada (Music Canada)	Platinum	100,000^{^}
United Kingdom (BPI)	Silver	60,000^{^}
United States (RIAA)	Platinum	1,000,000^{^}
^{^} Shipments figures based on certification alone.

== See also ==
- Grace Under Pressure Tour (audio-only releases)
- Grace Under Pressure Tour Video
