= Distant Early Warning (song) =

Single by Rush

from the album Grace Under Pressure
- B-side: "Between the Wheels"
- Released: April 1984
- Studio: Le Studio (Morin-Heights)
- Length: 4:45
- Label: Anthem
- Composers: Geddy Lee; Alex Lifeson
- Lyricist: Neil Peart
- Producers: Rush; Peter Henderson

Rush singles chronology
"Countdown" (1983)	"Distant Early Warning" (1984)	"The Body Electric" (1984)

"Distant Early Warning" is a song by Canadian rock band Rush. It was released as a single and as the lead track on their tenth studio album Grace Under Pressure (1984). As with most Rush songs, its music was composed by bassist and vocalist Geddy Lee and guitarist Alex Lifeson, while its lyrics were written by drummer Neil Peart.

== Lyrics and music ==
Greg Prato of AllMusic describes "Distant Early Warning" as a "tale about nuclear war". Its title is derived from the Distant Early Warning Line, a succession of missile detection radar systems located in Canada's northern Arctic region. Described by Stereogum as an "eloquent state-of-the-world address circa 1984", the song's lyrics contain references to nuclear fallout, acid rain, and communism, as well as environmentalism and the Cold War. Biographer Jon Collins calls the track an "environmental call to arms".

The song contains a synthesized intro played by Hugh Syme, who also created the artwork for the album. Collins opines that the track showcases Lifeson "at his dissonant best", while also highlighting its backing of "reverberating drums and keyboards".

== Release ==
Upon release, "Distant Early Warning" became a hit on US rock radio, reaching number three on the Billboard Top Tracks chart. The song has since been included on the compilation albums Chronicles (1990), Retrospective II: 1981–1987 (1997), and The Spirit of Radio: Greatest Hits 1974–1987 (2003), while live renditions appear on A Show of Hands (1989) and Rush in Rio (2003). A performance of the song was later released in promotion of the concert film Rush: Cinema Strangiato in 2019.

A music video was created for the song, directed by David Mallet. The video was filmed at Limehouse Studios in London and features Lee's son Julian. Described by Collins as "Kubrickesque", the video was Rush's first real attempt to appeal to MTV's audience.

== Personnel ==
- Geddy Lee – bass, keyboards, vocals
- Alex Lifeson – guitar
- Neil Peart – drums
- Hugh Syme – synthesizer
