= R40 Live =

Live album by Rush
- Released: November 20, 2015
- Recorded: June 17 and 19, 2015
- Venues: Air Canada Centre, Toronto, Canada
- Genres: Hard rock; progressive rock
- Length: 195:57 (CD version)
- Label: Anthem
- Producer: Allan Weinrib

Rush chronology
Clockwork Angels Tour (2013)	R40 Live (2015)

Professional ratings
Review scores
Source	Rating
AllMusic	4/5 stars

R40 Live is a live audio album and video release of Canadian rock band Rush, recorded on their high-grossing R40 Live Tour. Both formats were released November 20, 2015. The performances were filmed on June 17 and 19, 2015, at Air Canada Centre, Toronto, Canada.

The audio CD album consists of three discs. Disc 1 contains the entire first set, disc 2 contains the second set, and disc 3 contains the encore and seven bonus tracks.

R40 Live is noted for containing the only live performances of "Losing It", from the band's 1982 album Signals as well as "How It Is" from the band's 2002 album Vapor Trails. During set 1 of all disc formats, Benjamin Mink, who had played electric violin on the original studio recording, is featured as a guest performer. The album's common description, written by Philip Wilding, states: "The version [of Losing It] on the Signals album was raised ever higher by Ben Mink’s...wonderfully affecting violin part, the recreation of which had always put the song beyond the band’s live set." Among the bonus tracks on the third disc of the CD release is a second performance of the song featuring violinist Jonathan Dinklage, a member of the string ensemble that had backed Rush during their Clockwork Angels Tour.

Best Buy sold two deluxe edition box sets of R40 Live: CD/DVD and CD/Blu-ray. Both of these included an exclusive and limited-edition Starman projector flashlight, that projected a white Starman logo when the button was held. The metal flashlight is black with a gray label that reads "RUSH R40", and features a keychain on the end. These box sets were the only way to get the concert video and CD soundtrack together in a box set. Best Buy also made a promotional video for these deluxe box sets.

== Track listing ==
This is the track list for the three audio CDs.

All tracks are written by Neil Peart, Geddy Lee, and Alex Lifeson except where noted.

Set one (CD 1)
No.	Title	Length
1.	"The World Is...The World Is... [Intro Video]"	2:11
2.	"The Anarchist"	7:07
3.	"Headlong Flight/Drumbastica (drum solo)"	8:45
4.	"Far Cry"	5:31
5.	"The Main Monkey Business"	6:07
6.	"How It Is"	4:45
7.	"Animate"	6:15
8.	"Roll the Bones"	6:05
9.	"Between the Wheels"	5:58
10.	"Losing It" (with Ben Mink)	5:55
11.	"Subdivisions"	5:48

Set two (CD 2)
No.	Title	Length
1.	"Tom Sawyer" (Peart, Lee, Lifeson, Pye Dubois)	4:59
2.	"YYZ" (Lee, Peart)	4:41
3.	"The Spirit of Radio"	5:03
4.	"Natural Science"	8:31
5.	"Jacob's Ladder"	7:34
6.	"Cygnus X-1 Book II: Hemispheres: Prelude"	4:19
7.	"Cygnus X-1 Book I: The Voyage: Prologue/The Story So Far (drum solo)/Part III"	9:21
8.	"Closer to the Heart" (Peart, Lee, Lifeson, Peter Talbot)	3:07
9.	"Xanadu"	10:39
10.	"2112: Part I ("Overture")/Part II ("The Temples of Syrinx")/Part IV ("Presentation")/Part VII ("Grand Finale")"	12:15

Encore (CD 3, part 1)
No.	Title	Length
1.	"Mel's Rock Pile [Intro Video, featuring Eugene Levy]"	1:35
2.	"Lakeside Park/Anthem"	5:29
3.	"What You're Doing/Working Man" (Lee, Lifeson)	9:35

Bonus (CD 3, part 2)
No.	Title	Length
1.	"One Little Victory"	5:47
2.	"Distant Early Warning"	5:24
3.	"Red Barchetta"	7:08
4.	"Clockwork Angels"	7:46
5.	"The Wreckers"	5:39
6.	"The Camera Eye"	10:21
7.	"Losing It" (with Jonathan Dinklage)	6:13

The following info is on the CD bonus performances:

Track 4, “Clockwork Angels”, was recorded in Denver, Colorado on July 11, 2015.

Track 5, "The Wreckers", was recorded in Buffalo, New York on June 10, 2015.

Track 6, "The Camera Eye", was recorded in Kansas City, Missouri on July 9, 2015.

Jonathan Dinklage played the violin part for track 7, "Losing It", which was recorded in Los Angeles on August 1. He performed with the band during their earlier Clockwork Angels Tour, as part of the Clockwork Angels String Ensemble.

== Personnel ==
- Geddy Lee – vocals, bass guitar, keyboards, rhythm guitar in "Xanadu"
- Alex Lifeson - guitars, backing vocals
- Neil Peart – drums, percussion

== Charts ==
Audio

Chart (2015)	Peak position
Canadian Albums (Billboard)	30
Dutch Albums (Album Top 100)	54
German Albums (Offizielle Top 100)	49
UK Albums (Official Charts)	47
US Billboard 200	24
US Top Hard Rock Albums (Billboard)	1
US Top Rock Albums (Billboard)	1
US Indie Store Album Sales (Billboard)	2

== Certifications ==
DVD

Region	Certification	Certified units/sales
United States (RIAA)	Gold	50,000^{^}
^{^} Shipments figures based on certification alone.
