= Clockwork Angels Tour (album) =

Live album by Rush
- Released: November 19, 2013
- Recorded: November 25, 2012; November 28, 2012; November 30, 2012
- Venues: US Airways Center (Phoenix, AZ); American Airlines Center (Dallas, TX); AT&T Center (San Antonio, TX)
- Genres: Hard rock, progressive rock
- Length: 184:44
- Label: Anthem

Rush chronology
Clockwork Angels (2012)	Clockwork Angels Tour (2013)	R40 Live (2015)

Clockwork Angels Tour is a live album and film of Canadian progressive rock band Rush's Clockwork Angels Tour, released on November 19, 2013. The performances were selected from the band's shows in Phoenix, Dallas, and San Antonio (November 25, 28 and 30, 2012, respectively). On May 14, 2014, the DVD release was certified Platinum by the RIAA.

== Track listing ==
The CD album consists of three discs. Disc #1 contains the entire first set, disc #2 presents all tracks from the album Clockwork Angels that were performed during the tour, and disc #3 contains the rest of the second set plus encore and bonus tracks.

Disc One
No.	Title	Length
1.	"Subdivisions"	5:39
2.	"The Big Money"	6:02
3.	"Force Ten"	5:35
4.	"Grand Designs"	5:15
5.	"The Body Electric"	4:52
6.	"Territories"	6:46
7.	"The Analog Kid"	5:24
8.	"Bravado"	5:46
9.	"Where's My Thing?"/"Here It Is!" (drum solo)	8:23
10.	"Far Cry"	5:35

Disc Two
No.	Title	Length
1.	"Caravan"	5:42
2.	"Clockwork Angels"	8:12
3.	"The Anarchist"	6:59
4.	"Carnies"	5:16
5.	"The Wreckers"	5:27
6.	"Headlong Flight"/"Drumbastica" (drum solo)	8:17
7.	"Peke's Repose" (guitar solo)/"Halo Effect"	5:15
8.	"Seven Cities of Gold"	6:24
9.	"Wish Them Well"	6:41
10.	"The Garden"	7:16

Disc Three
No.	Title	Length
1.	"Dreamline"	5:19
2.	"The Percussor" (drum solo): I. "Binary Love Theme" (1:40); II. Steambanger's Ball" (1:30)	3:10
3.	"Red Sector A"	5:21
4.	"YYZ"	4:52
5.	"The Spirit of Radio"	6:28
6.	"Tom Sawyer" (Encore)	5:57
7.	"2112": Overture" /"The Temples of Syrinx"/"Grand Finale" (Encore)	8:24
8.	"Limelight" (Soundcheck Recording)" (Bonus Track)	4:43
9.	"Middletown Dreams" (Bonus Track)	5:23
10.	"The Pass" (Bonus Track)	5:05
11.	"Manhattan Project" (Bonus Track)	5:21

== DVD/Blu-ray extras ==
- "Can't Stop Thinking Big" tour documentary film
- Behind the Scenes (featuring Jay Baruchel)
- Intro/post-show video outtakes
- Interview with Dwush
- Family Goy
- Family Sawyer
- The Watchmaker (Video intro for the second set)
- Office of the Watchmaker (Post-show video)

== Personnel ==
Rush

- Geddy Lee – vocals, bass guitar, keyboards
- Alex Lifeson – guitar, backing vocals, piano on "The Garden"
- Neil Peart – drums, percussion

Clockwork Angels String Ensemble

- David Campbell – conductor
- Mario De Leon – violin
- Joel Derouin – violin
- Jonathan Dinklage – violin
- Gerry Hilera – violin
- Audrey Solomon – violin
- Adele Stein – cello
- Jacob Szekely – cello
- Hiroko Taguchi – violin
- Entcho Todorov – violin

The ensemble is featured on all tracks in the second set except "The Percussor" and "The Spirit of Radio," and also on the bonus track "Manhattan Project."

== Charts ==
Audio

Chart (2013)	Peak position
Canadian Albums (Billboard)	75
Dutch Albums (Album Top 100)	87
German Albums (Offizielle Top 100)	82
Hungarian Albums (MAHASZ)	40
UK Albums (Official Charts)	65
US Billboard 200	33
US Top Hard Rock Albums (Billboard)	12
US Top Rock Albums (Billboard)	12
US Indie Store Album Sales (Billboard)	12

== Certifications ==
DVD

Region	Certification	Certified units/sales
Canada (Music Canada)	3× Platinum	30,000^{^}
United States (RIAA)	Platinum	100,000^{^}
^{^} Shipments figures based on certification alone.
