= I Love You, Man =

2009 film by John Hamburg

- Theatrical release poster
- Directed by: John Hamburg
- Screenplay by: John Hamburg; Larry Levin
- Story by: Larry Levin
- Produced by: Donald De Line; John Hamburg
- Starring: Paul Rudd; Jason Segel; Rashida Jones; Andy Samberg; J. K. Simmons; Jane Curtin; Jon Favreau; Jaime Pressly
- Cinematography: Lawrence Sher
- Edited by: William Kerr
- Music by: Theodore Shapiro
- Production companies: DreamWorks Pictures; De Line Pictures; Bernard Gayle Productions; The Montecito Picture Company
- Distributed by: Paramount Pictures
- Release date: March 20, 2009
- Running time: 105 minutes
- Country: United States
- Language: English
- Budget: $40 million
- Box office: $92 million

I Love You, Man is a 2009 American bromantic comedy film written and directed by John Hamburg, based on a script by Larry Levin. The film stars Paul Rudd as a friendless man struggling to find a best man for his upcoming wedding, and the new best friend (Jason Segel) he finds strains his relationship with his fiancée (Rashida Jones).

The film was produced by DreamWorks Pictures, De Line Pictures, Bernard Gayle Productions and The Montecito Picture Company and released theatrically in the United States by Paramount Pictures on March 20, 2009, to mostly positive reviews. The film grossed $92 million on a $40 million budget. It marked the third collaboration between Segel and Rudd, after Knocked Up (2007) and Forgetting Sarah Marshall (2008).

== Plot ==
Peter Klaven, a Los Angeles real estate agent, proposes to his girlfriend Zooey Rice, and she accepts. He does not have any close male friends to share the news with, only family and female acquaintances. After overhearing her friends' concern over his lack of guy friends, Peter decides he needs to find some to have a best man for the wedding.

Peter turns to his gay younger brother, Robbie, for advice on meeting men. He makes a series of overtures toward various men, including Barry, the persistently hot-headed husband of Zooey's friend Denise. Barry is not fond of Peter, and Peter, after winning a beer-drinking contest, inadvertently projectile-vomits on Barry.

Feeling rejected, Peter gives up on the best man search. At an open house at Lou Ferrigno's mansion, which he is trying to sell, he meets Sydney Fife, an investor who is attending the show to pick up divorced women and take advantage of the free food. They become friends, bonding over their mutual adoration of the rock band Rush. Peter introduces Sydney to Zooey at their engagement party, but a nervous Sydney makes an awkward toast which includes veiled encouragement for Zooey to perform oral sex on Peter.

The next night, Peter attends a Rush concert with Sydney, on the condition that he bring Zooey. During the concert, she feels ignored by them. The next day, while shopping for tuxedos, Sydney asks Peter why he is marrying Zooey, and also asks for an $8,000 loan. After some thought, Peter decides to lend Sydney the money, and later asks him to be his best man. Zooey, meanwhile, has become suspicious of Sydney. Peter tells her that he lent Sydney money and asks her if she knows why they are getting married, since he had no answer to Sydney's question (not aware the question was supposed to stay between him and Sydney). Hurt and angry, Zooey leaves.

Peter goes to work the next morning, discovering Sydney has used the $8,000 loan to purchase billboard advertisements promoting Peter's real estate business (with photos of Peter that Sydney took). Still upset over his fight with Zooey, he confronts Sydney and ends their friendship. Peter then patches things up with Zooey, explaining that although he is nervous, he is ready to get married. As they prepare for the wedding, Sydney finds himself alone and desperate to hang out with someone.

At work, Peter discovers that Sydney's billboard advertising campaign was successful. He won back the right to the lucrative Ferrigno listing and many others left messages, wanting him to sell their houses. Feeling encouraged, Peter finally stands up to his insufferable colleague, Tevin Downey, who had been badgering Peter for half the selling rights to the Ferrigno property. Peter slaps him, telling him to back off.

Peter feels bad about fighting with Sydney but does not re-invite him to the wedding. Instead, he assembles an array of random groomsmen that includes Robbie, their father Oswald, and Ferrigno. Before the wedding, Zooey sees Peter looking forlorn, clearly missing Sydney. She calls and invites Sydney, who is, unbeknownst to them, already en route to the wedding.

Just before the vows are to be taken, Sydney makes a dramatic entrance via Vespa. He reminds Peter and Zooey that he is, in fact, a successful investor and returns the money he borrowed from Peter, announcing the billboards were their wedding present. Peter and Zooey declare their love to each other, Sydney assumes the role of best man, and the wedding continues.

At the wedding reception, Peter and Sydney join the hired band in a rendition of the Rush song "Limelight" and pull Zooey on stage to join them. Sydney attempts to toast the newlyweds and Peter runs to stop him, remembering Sydney's ill-advised toast at the engagement dinner.

== Cast ==
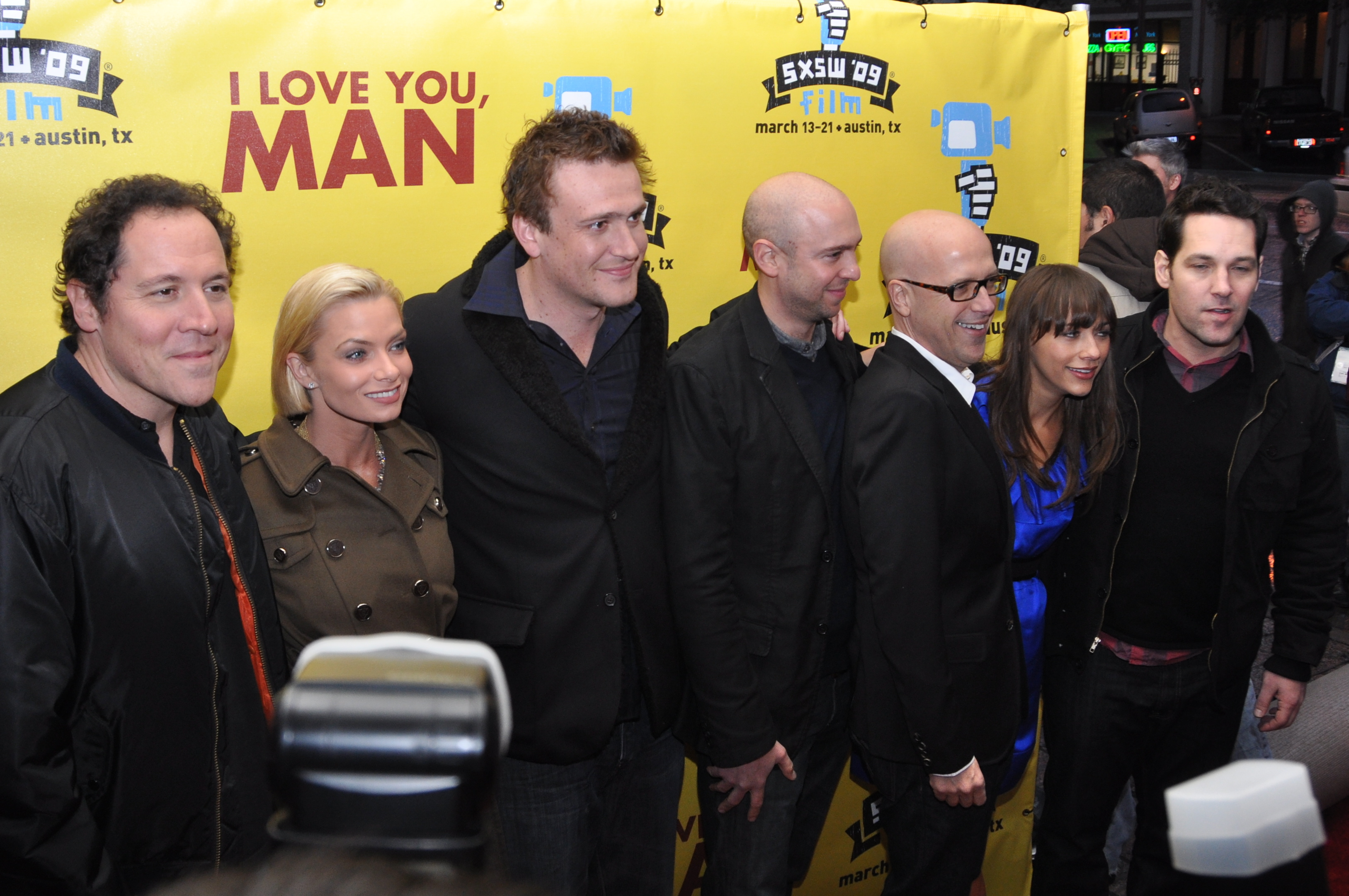
Jon Favreau, Jaime Pressly, Jason Segel, John Hamburg, Larry Levin, Rashida Jones, and Paul Rudd at the premiere in Austin, Texas in March 2009.

- Paul Rudd as Peter Klaven
- Jason Segel as Sydney Fife
- Rashida Jones as Zooey Rice
- Andy Samberg as Robbie Klaven
- J. K. Simmons as Oswald Klaven
- Jane Curtin as Joyce Klaven
- Jaime Pressly as Denise McLean
- Jon Favreau as Barry McLean
- Sarah Burns as Hailey
- Lou Ferrigno as himself
- Rob Huebel as Tevin Downey
- Thomas Lennon as Doug Evans
- Aziz Ansari as Eugene
- Nick Kroll as Larry
- Mather Zickel as Gil
- Murray Gershenz as Mel Stein
- Joe Lo Truglio as Lonnie
- Josh Cooke as Alan
- Jean Villepique as Leanne
- Jerry Minor, Jay Chandrasekhar, Seth Morris, and James Engel as Barry's Buddies
- Nelson Franklin and Ethan Smith as Sydney's Buddies
- David Krumholtz - uncredited, role was one of Sydney's Buddies
- Carla Gallo, Liz Cackowski, Kulap Vilaysack, Catherine Reitman, and Vicki Davis as Zooey's friends
- Kym Whitley, Colleen Crabtree, and Caroline Farah as Peter's co-workers
- Larry Wilmore as Minister
- Ping Wu as Mr. Chu
- Matt Walsh as Impatient Golfer
- Rush (Geddy Lee, Alex Lifeson, and Neil Peart) as themselves
- OK Go as the wedding band 'Tastes Like Chicken'

== Production ==
"I really wrote my own version of the script, so my version was always going to be R-rated. I wanted to discuss sex, I wanted to discuss – there were blowjobs in the movie, there was Sydney Fife's character who's no way he could live in a PG-13 universe. It wasn't like trying to be raunchy or gratuitous, it was just like, I think most people live in an R-rated world."" — John Hamburg, Director/Co-Writer/Producer

The script, Let's Be Friends, was originally written by Larry Levin. It was purchased but went unused for about 11 years before the film was made. John Hamburg was offered the script and kept turning it down, but after his friends moved to Los Angeles he was inspired by the experience of trying to meet more friends to give it a shot. When Hamburg finally took the script he rewrote it to make it as real as possible. The film was originally announced in December 2007, with production originally scheduled for March 2008. In March 2008, Variety revealed that executive producer Ivan Reitman's Montecito Picture Company officially began production on I Love You, Man during the week of March 31, 2008.

=== Casting ===
I Love You, Man is the third collaboration between Paul Rudd and Jason Segel, following the Judd Apatow projects Knocked Up and Forgetting Sarah Marshall, while writer/director Hamburg previously worked with Segel on Apatow's Undeclared television series. It only took one lunch to get Segel and Rudd to sign on to do the film and this set the stage for other actors to sign on. On February 13, 2008 it was announced that Rashida Jones would be the female lead opposite Rudd. Later, in an interview with FirstShowing.net, Jones revealed that because Segel and Rudd were already attached to the project she "knew immediately that it was gonna be even funnier than I would think." At the beginning of the March 31, 2008 week, The Hollywood Reporter announced that Jaime Pressly had joined the film's cast, playing the best friend of Rashida Jones' character. Hamburg comically stated that he was lucky in casting J.K. Simmons because his contract states "he has to be in one out of every four movies made." Jon Favreau started working on the film the same week Iron Man came out, a film which he directed. He said he "probably wouldn't have agreed to have done it had I known my life was going to be that shape", but Iron Man star Robert Downey Jr. told him that "It is the best thing you could do" – he said 'chop wood, carry water,' which is what they do in the Kung Fu movies to keep you humble."

=== Lawsuit ===
One of late President of Egypt Anwar Sadat's daughters filed a lawsuit in Egypt against the filmmakers because, in the film, Sydney's dog is named after her father. He tells Peter that he thinks "they look exactly alike." Samir Sabri, the lawyer in the case, asked the US embassy to apologize. Complaints were raised by Egyptian bloggers as well.

=== Rush ===
Rush was approached by Hamburg, a fan of the band, to appear in the film. The filming schedule was tight because there was a one-day window between two of their concerts on tour. The band later said that they enjoyed the experience. Hamburg felt that "once Rush got that I wasn't poking fun at them, that I'm genuinely a fan and the main characters of the movie are fans and it's kind of a loving tribute to them, I think that's when they came on board."

Subsequently, Rudd and Segel appeared in character as Peter and Sydney alongside the members of Rush in a short video played at the end of concerts during the band's 2010–11 Time Machine Tour. In August 2013, Rudd reprised his character at the final show of Rush's Clockwork Angels Tour, conducting the Clockwork Angels Orchestra (a string section which accompanied the band) during the song "YYZ." In 2015, on Rush's R40 Live Tour, Rudd and Segel were featured among other celebrities in an accompanying rear-screen video lip-synching the rap section to the song "Roll the Bones".. The duo reprised their roles on two video segments on Rush's Fifty Something tour that kicked off at the Los Angeles Forum on June 7 2026.

== Reception ==
=== Critical response ===
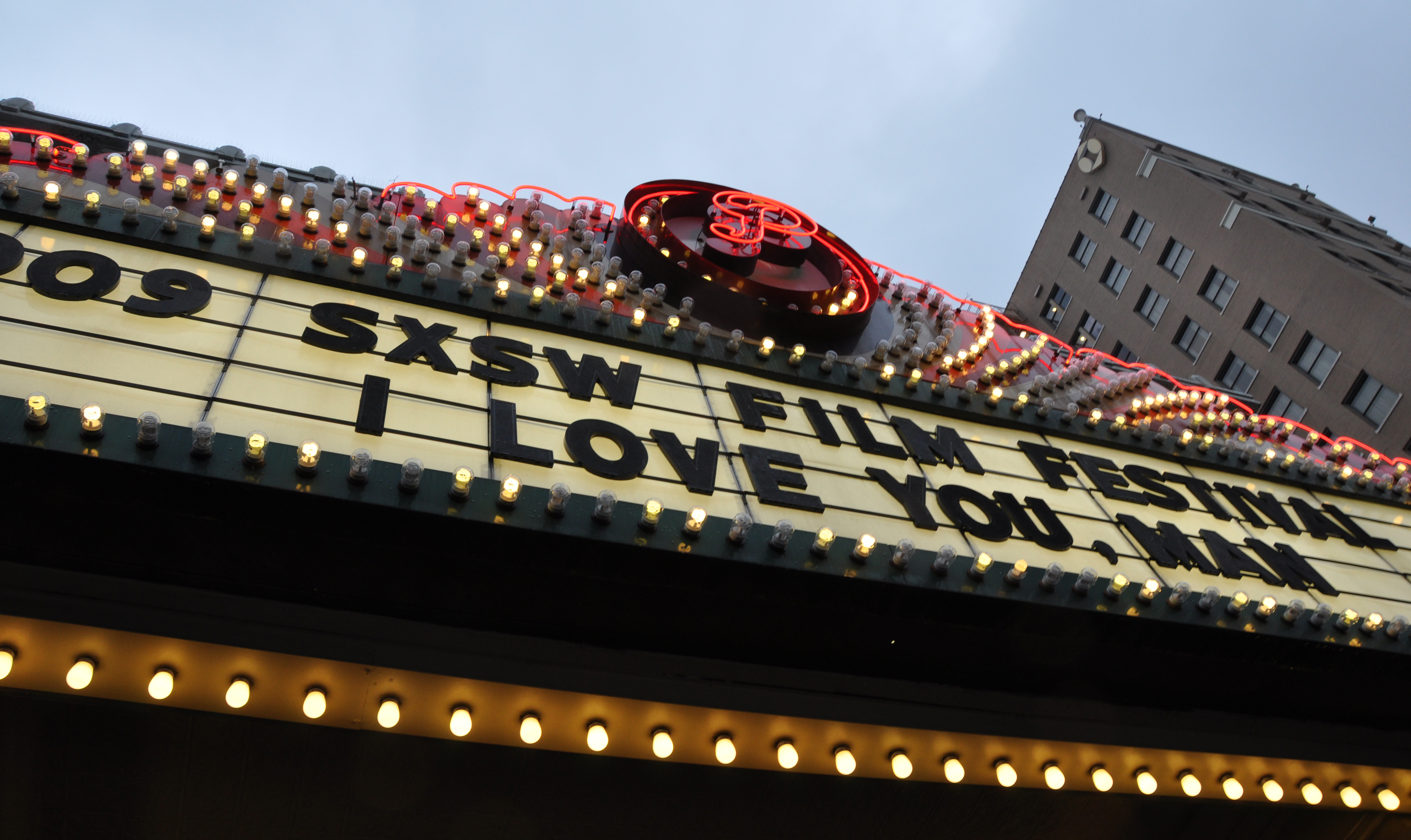
Sign at Paramount Theatre in Austin, Texas advertising the premiere of the film

On Rotten Tomatoes the film has an approval rating of 82% based on 204 reviews, with an average rating of 6.9/10. The website's critical consensus states, "I Love You, Man makes the most of its simple premise due to the heartfelt and hilarious performances of Paul Rudd and Jason Segel." On Metacritic the film has a weighted average score of 70 out of 100, based on 34 critics, indicating "generally favorable" reviews. Audiences surveyed by CinemaScore gave the film an average grade of "B+" on scale of A+ to F.

Giving the film three out of four stars, Peter Travers of Rolling Stone said that despite the formulaic plot, "the right actors can keep it afloat, even airborne." He also praised the supporting cast. Entertainment Weekly gave the film an "A", and said that "Paul Rudd gives a startlingly funny and original performance." USA Today gave the film a glowing review, stating "the movie works because everything hinges on the camaraderie and undeniable chemistry between Rudd and Segel." More conservatively, People magazine said the movie "sails along on goodwill and blush-worthy bawdiness," but concluded that "like instant chocolate pudding, it goes down easy — even if it isn't especially good for you."

The film was not without its critics. Peter Rainer of The Christian Science Monitor was not impressed with the film, and after noting that the character Sydney seemed to be written for Owen Wilson, Rainer remarked, "Maybe Wilson was busy. Lucky him." The Colorado Daily described the relationship between the male leads as a "watered-down false bromance", noting that the pace of their relationship seemed "rushed", and that Peter was looking out for his wife rather than his best friend.

=== Box office ===
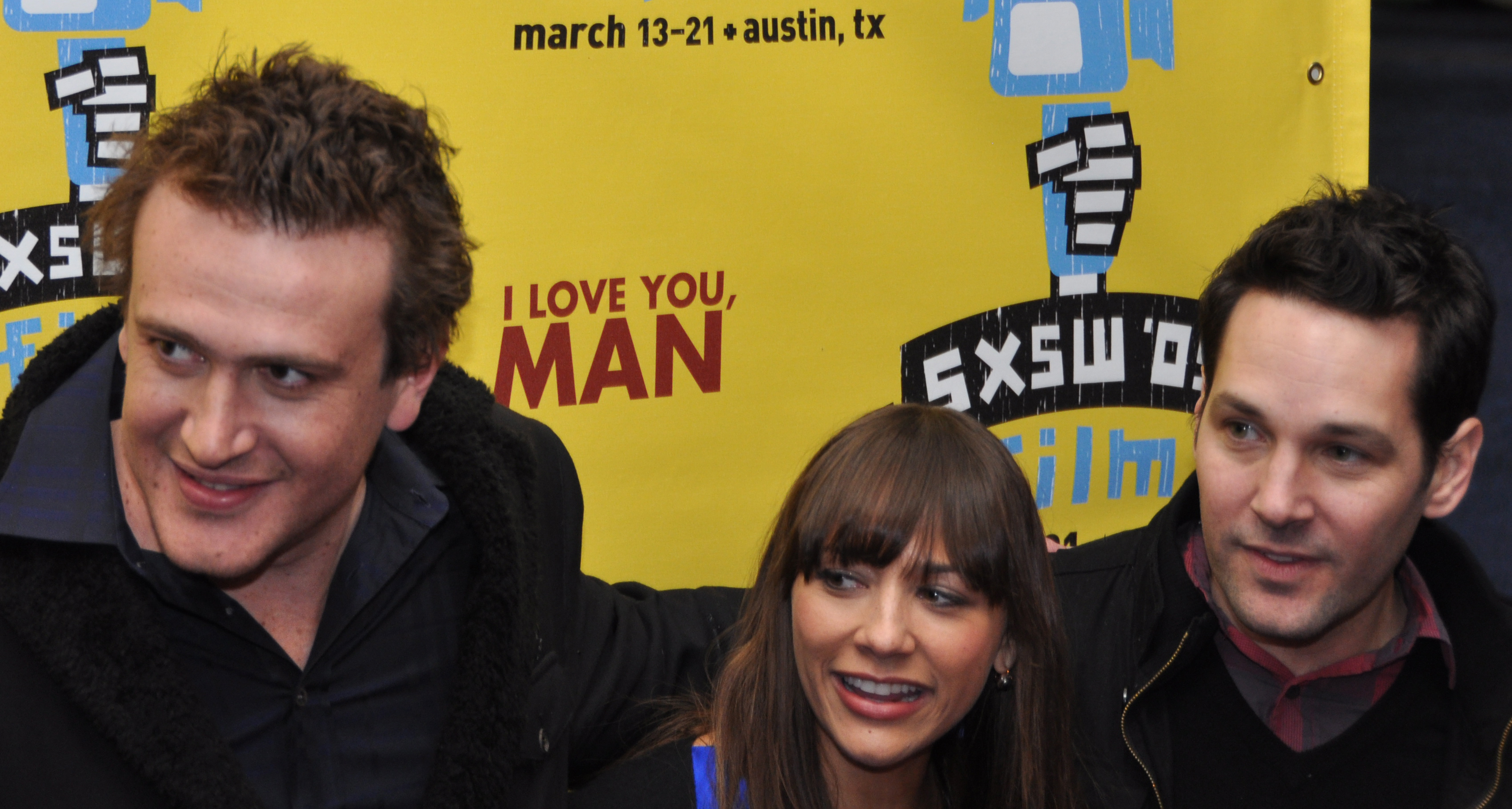
Segel (left), Jones, and Rudd at the film's Austin premiere

In its U.S. opening weekend, the film made $17.8 million in 2,711 theaters, ranking number two at the box office. I Love You, Man stayed in the box office top ten for five weeks and was number 27 among films released in 2009. The film grossed $71.4 million domestically and $20.2 million internationally making $93.4 million worldwide.

=== Home media ===
The film was released on Blu-ray and DVD on August 11, 2009, in the US and August 24, 2009, in Europe and as of November 2009 generated more than $22 million in DVD sales. I Love You, Man was ranked number two in sales during its opening week and declined from there. The DVD extras contains an hour and a half of content including a full performance of "Limelight".

=== Awards ===
The film has been nominated for Best Kiss for the 2009 MTV Movie Awards for the smooch between Thomas Lennon's character Doug and Rudd's Peter, but lost to Twilight. It was also nominated for a GLAAD Media Award for "Outstanding Film – Wide Release" during the 21st GLAAD Media Awards.

== Soundtrack ==
I Love You, Man

Soundtrack album by Various Artists
- Released: March 17, 2009
- Length: 49:11
- Label: Lakeshore Records
- Producer: Theodore Shapiro

Professional ratings
Review scores
Source	Rating
AllMusic	3.5/5 stars
SoundtrackNet	3/5 stars

Track #	Title	Performer	Length
1	"Good Times"	Latch Key Kid	2:30
2	"Oxford Comma"	Vampire Weekend	3:15
3	"Tom Sawyer"	Rush	4:35
4	"Set You Free"	The Black Keys	2:45
5	"Lights Out"	Santigold	3:12
6	"Soul of a Man"	Beck	2:37
7	"Limelight"	Rush	4:20
8	"Good Times Roll"	The Cars	3:47
9	"The Underdog"	Spoon	3:42
10	"Campus"	Vampire Weekend	2:56
11	"Mr. Pitiful"	Matt Costa	2:55
12	"Dancing With Myself"	The Donnas	3:28
13	"Waterslide"	The Bonedaddys	3:54
14	"Limelight"	Paul Rudd & Jason Segel	4:22
15	"Ain't That a Kick in the Head?"	Dean Martin	2:26
16	"Peter and Zooey"	Teddy Shapiro	2:17
