= Time Machine 2011: Live in Cleveland =

Live album by Rush
- Released: 8 November 2011
- Recorded: 15 April 2011
- Venue: Quicken Loans Arena in Cleveland, Ohio
- Genre: Progressive rock, hard rock
- Length: 146:59
- Label: Anthem
- Producer: Banger Films

Rush chronology
Working Men (2009)	Time Machine 2011: Live in Cleveland (2011)	Clockwork Angels (2012)

Professional ratings
Aggregate scores
Source	Rating
Metacritic	79/100
Review scores
Source	Rating
AllMusic	4/5 stars
Rolling Stone	3.5/5 stars

Time Machine 2011: Live in Cleveland is a concert DVD, Blu-ray and double CD by Canadian rock band Rush released on 8 November 2011. It was filmed on 15 April 2011 at the Quicken Loans Arena in Cleveland, Ohio during the band's Time Machine Tour. The DVD film was recorded by Banger Films, which had previously produced the Rush documentary Rush: Beyond the Lighted Stage. The Moving Pictures portion of the concert was released on vinyl and digitally under the title Moving Pictures: Live 2011. In Canada in 2023 and 2024, the film was carried on Hollywood Suite under the title, Rush: Time Machine Tour.

The album was nominated for a Juno Award in the "Music DVD of the Year" category. On 14 May 2014, the DVD was certified 2× Platinum in the US with 200,000 copies sold. It was later reissued as a part of the DVD and Blu-ray box set titled R40, released on 11 November 2014.

== Track listing ==
The following is the setlist of the concert filmed for Time Machine 2011: Live in Cleveland.

All tracks are written by Geddy Lee, Alex Lifeson and Neil Peart, except where noted.

Disc one
No.	Title	Writer(s)	Length
1.	"The Spirit of Radio"		5:02
2.	"Time Stand Still"		5:16
3.	"Presto"		6:32
4.	"Stick It Out"		4:22
5.	"Workin' Them Angels"		4:44
6.	"Leave That Thing Alone"	Lee, Lifeson	5:13
7.	"Faithless"		5:57
8.	"BU2B"		4:23
9.	"Freewill"		5:29
10.	"Marathon"		6:29
11.	"Subdivisions"		5:30
12.	"Tom Sawyer"	Lee, Lifeson, Peart, Pye Dubois	4:53
13.	"Red Barchetta"		6:55
14.	"YYZ"	Lee, Peart	4:32
15.	"Limelight"		4:31

Disc two
No.	Title	Writer(s)	Length
1.	"The Camera Eye"		10:10
2.	"Witch Hunt"		4:42
3.	"Vital Signs"		5:28
4.	"Caravan"		5:36
5.	"Moto Perpetuo/Love for Sale" (Drum solo)	Peart, Cole Porter	8:22
6.	"O'Malley's Break" (Acoustic solo)	Lifeson	1:33
7.	"Closer to the Heart"	Lee, Lifeson, Peart, Peter Talbot	3:28
8.	"2112 Overture/The Temples of Syrinx"		7:10
9.	"Far Cry"		6:22
10.	"La Villa Strangiato" (polka intro)		7:40
11.	"Working Man" (reggae intro)	Lee, Lifeson	6:40

== DVD/Blu-ray extras ==
- Outtakes from the video introductions to both sets
- Alternate film intro version of "Tom Sawyer"
- "Need Some Love" – Live at Laura Secord Secondary School, St Catharines, Ontario, 1974 (with original drummer John Rutsey; part of the band's appearance on the TV series Canadian Bandstand)
- "Anthem" – Live in Passaic, New Jersey, 1976

The post-show video that played during the tour (featuring Paul Rudd and Jason Segel) is not included on the DVD/Blu-ray release. In its place is a closing segment that features Lee, Lifeson and Peart performing a polka rendition of "Closer to the Heart" and portraying their characters from the video intro for the first set.

== Charts ==
Audio

Chart (2011)	Peak position
Canadian Albums (Billboard)	59
German Albums (Offizielle Top 100)	58
UK Albums (Official Charts)	70
US Billboard 200	54
US Top Hard Rock Albums (Billboard)	4
US Top Rock Albums (Billboard)	13
US Indie Store Album Sales (Billboard)	8

== Certifications ==
DVD

Region	Certification	Certified units/sales
United States (RIAA)	2× Platinum	200,000^{^}
^{^} Shipments figures based on certification alone.
