= Time Machine Tour =

2010–2011 concert tour by Rush

- Tour by Rush
- Promotional poster for the tour
- Location: Europe; North America; South America
- Start date: June 29, 2010
- End date: July 2, 2011
- Legs: 2
- No. of shows: 81

Rush concert chronology
- Snakes & Arrows Tour (2007–08); Time Machine Tour (2010–11); Clockwork Angels Tour (2012–13)

The Time Machine Tour was a concert tour by the Canadian rock band Rush that began on June 29, 2010 in Albuquerque, New Mexico and ended July 2, 2011 at The Gorge Amphitheatre in George, Washington. The tour was notable for featuring the album Moving Pictures played in its entirety for the first time live, as well as material from the band's then upcoming studio album Clockwork Angels (i.e. the songs "Caravan" and "BU2B", which had been released as a single in early June 2010). This tour is one of three where the setlist has been consistent throughout the entire tour, the others being the 1987 Hold Your Fire tour and the 2004 R30: 30th Anniversary Tour. This is also the first Rush tour to not include any songs from Roll the Bones in the set list since that album was released in 1991.

As a tribute to the city that first played their music on the radio, the Cleveland performance at Quicken Loans Arena on April 15, 2011 was recorded/filmed and released as a DVD, Blu-ray, and double CD titled Time Machine 2011: Live in Cleveland. This is the first official full-length live performance filming of Rush in the United States.

== Set list ==
Set 1

1. "The Spirit of Radio"
2. "Time Stand Still"
3. "Presto"
4. "Stick It Out"
5. "Workin' Them Angels"
6. "Leave That Thing Alone"
7. "Faithless"
8. "BU2B"
9. "Freewill"
10. "Marathon"
11. "Subdivisions"

Set 2

1. "Tom Sawyer"
2. "Red Barchetta"
3. "YYZ"
4. "Limelight"
5. "The Camera Eye"
6. "Witch Hunt"
7. "Vital Signs"
8. "Caravan"
9. "Moto Perpetuo/Love for Sale" (Neil Peart drum solo)
10. "O'Malley's Break" (Twelve-string guitar solo)
11. "Closer to the Heart"
12. "2112"
  I: "Overture"
  II: "The Temples of Syrinx"
13. "Far Cry"

Encore:

1. "La Villa Strangiato" (with polka intro)
2. "Working Man" (with reggae intro and "Cygnus X-1: Book I" outro)

Post Show:

Post-show video depicting the characters Peter Klaven and Sydney Fife (played respectively by Paul Rudd and Jason Segel) from the 2009 film I Love You, Man annoying the band members after the gig.

== Tour dates ==
List of 2010 concerts
Date	City	Country	Venue	Capacity/Attendance/Gross
June 29, 2010	Albuquerque	United States	The Pavilion	8,516 / 6,624 / $384,086
July 1, 2010	Kansas City	United States	Starlight Theatre	7,733 / 6,042 / $428,754
July 3, 2010	Milwaukee	United States	Marcus Amphitheater (Summerfest)	22,895 / 14,521 / $669,185
July 5, 2010	Chicago	United States	Charter One Pavilion	7,068 / 6,247 / $568,858
July 9, 2010	Sarnia	Canada	Sarnia Bayfest	20,000 / 19,546 / $1,220,000
July 11, 2010	Ottawa	Canada	Cisco Ottawa Bluesfest	35,000 / 31,298 / $1,970,000
July 13, 2010	Toronto	Canada	Molson Amphitheatre	14,528 / 12,453 / $813,868
July 15, 2010	Quebec City	Canada	Quebec City Summer Festival	100,000 / 88,550 / $3,860,000
July 17, 2010	Toronto	Canada	Air Canada Centre	12,191 / 12,191 / $1,258,740
July 19, 2010	Uncasville	United States	Mohegan Sun Arena	7,627 / 5,291 / $452,430
July 21, 2010	Camden	United States	Susquehanna Bank Center	14,880 / 9,760 / $696,214
July 23, 2010	Saratoga Springs	United States	Saratoga Performing Arts Center	13,977 / 8,297 / $575,493
July 24, 2010	Wantagh	United States	Nikon at Jones Beach Theatre	14,090 / 13,586 / $1,022,344
August 5, 2010	West Valley City	United States	USANA Amphitheatre	14,500 / 8,660 / $558,868
August 7, 2010	Auburn	United States	White River Amphitheatre	15,865 / 11,742 / $855,997
August 9, 2010	Mountain View	United States	Shoreline Amphitheatre	14,852 / 13,994 / $695,844
August 11, 2010	Los Angeles	United States	Gibson Amphitheatre	5,954 / 5,455 / $705,455
August 13, 2010	Irvine	United States	Verizon Wireless Amphitheatre	14,956 / 12,403 / $870,119
August 14, 2010	Paradise	United States	MGM Grand Garden Arena	10,258 / 9,591 / $993,351
August 16, 2010	Morrison	United States	Red Rocks Amphitheatre	8,660 / 8,188 / $750,685
August 18, 2010	Morrison	United States	Red Rocks Amphitheatre	8,660 / 8,188 / $750,685
August 20, 2010	Wichita	United States	Intrust Bank Arena	6,676 / 5,119 / $382,710
August 22, 2010	Maryland Heights	United States	Verizon Wireless Amphitheatre	13,000 / 11,008 / $614,821
August 23, 2010	Chicago	United States	Charter One Pavilion	7,068 / 6,247 / $568,858
August 25, 2010	Omaha	United States	Qwest Center Omaha	7,461 / 6,236 / $479,519
August 27, 2010	Saint Paul	United States	Minnesota State Fair	13,248 / 12,882 / $779,606
August 29, 2010	Columbus	United States	Nationwide Arena	12,354 / 11,402 / $831,186
August 31, 2010	Allentown	United States	Great Allentown Fair	9,694 / 9,622 / $706,830
September 2, 2010	Syracuse	United States	New York State Fair	17,367 / 12,364 / $710,980
September 3, 2010	Holmdel	United States	PNC Bank Arts Center	14,000 / 10,974 / $784,117
September 14, 2010	Boston	United States	TD Garden	11,903 / 11,331 / $948,004
September 16, 2010	Pittsburgh	United States	Consol Energy Center	11,487 / 11,053 / $687,691
September 18, 2010	Bristow	United States	Jiffy Lube Live	16,639 / 13,999 / $866,704
September 21, 2010	Tulsa	United States	BOK Center	10,027 / 7,110 / $577,753
September 23, 2010	San Antonio	United States	AT&T Center	11,326 / 9,289 / $731,550
September 25, 2010	The Woodlands	United States	Cynthia Woods Mitchell Pavilion	15,858 / 15,225 / $897,778
September 26, 2010	Dallas	United States	Superpages.com Center	13,715 / 11,420 / $723,024
September 29, 2010	Alpharetta	United States	Verizon Wireless Amphitheatre at Encore Park	12,086 / 11,437 / $745,988
October 1, 2010	Tampa	United States	1-800-ASK-GARY Amphitheatre	19,508 / 11,418 / $728,923
October 2, 2010	West Palm Beach	United States	Cruzan Amphitheatre	15,116 / 10,647 / $611,647
October 8, 2010	São Paulo	Brazil	Morumbi Stadium	50,600 / 26,015 / $3,337,130
October 10, 2010	Rio de Janeiro	Brazil	Praça da Apoteose	32,400 / 10,308 / $1,049,950
October 15, 2010	Buenos Aires	Argentina	G.E.B.A	18,392 / 8,528 / $655,162
October 17, 2010	Santiago	Chile	Estadio Nacional de Chile	51,000 / 36,840 / $3,720,293

List of 2011 concerts
Date	City	Country	Venue	Capacity/Attendance/Gross
March 30, 2011	Fort Lauderdale	United States	BankAtlantic Center	7,671 / 7,671 / $599,150
April 2, 2011	Greensboro	United States	Greensboro Coliseum	11,304 / 10,183 / $704,352
April 3, 2011	Nashville	United States	Bridgestone Arena	11,122 / 10,093 / $651,738
April 5, 2011	Louisville	United States	KFC Yum! Center	8,358 / 8,139 / $545,149
April 8, 2011	Hershey	United States	Giant Center	9,158 / 9,158 / $744,298
April 10, 2011	New York City	United States	Madison Square Garden	13,207 / 13,207 / $1,276,798
April 12, 2011	Chicago	United States	United Center	12,178 / 11,670 / $1,009,885
April 13, 2011	Toledo	United States	Huntington Center	5,969 / 5,736 / $370,004
April 15, 2011	Cleveland	United States	Quicken Loans Arena	14,970 / 14,970 / $958,727
April 17, 2011	Auburn Hills	United States	The Palace of Auburn Hills	9,987 / 9,987 / 826,549
April 19, 2011	Hamilton	Canada	Copps Coliseum	13,500 / 13,500 / $1,009,495
April 20, 2011	Montreal	Canada	Bell Centre	11,590 / 11,590 / $1,008,250
April 22, 2011	Baltimore	United States	1st Mariner Arena	11,006 / 11,006 / $821,493
May 4, 2011	Helsinki	Finland	Hartwall Areena	N/A
May 6, 2011	Stockholm	Sweden	Ericsson Globe	10,764 / 5,637 / $456,028
May 8, 2011	Malmö	Sweden	Malmö Arena	N/A
May 12, 2011	Dublin	Ireland	The O_{2}	7,000 / 6,278 / $602,861
May 14, 2011	Glasgow	Scotland	S.E.C.C. Arena	N/A
May 16, 2011	Sheffield	England	Motorpoint Arena	N/A
May 19, 2011	Manchester	England	Manchester Evening News Arena	10,285 / 9,115 / $861,850
May 21, 2011	Newcastle	England	Metro Radio Arena	6,508 / 5,151 / $505,613
May 22, 2011	Birmingham	England	LG Arena	12,628 / 11,287 / $1,092,646
May 25, 2011	London	England	The O_{2} Arena	13,517 / 12,984 / $1,221,530
May 27, 2011	Rotterdam	Netherlands	Rotterdam Ahoy	N/A
May 29, 2011	Frankfurt	Germany	Festhalle Frankfurt	N/A
June 8, 2011	Greenville	United States	Bi-Lo Center	10,422 / 8,027 / $503,228
June 10, 2011	New Orleans	United States	New Orleans Arena	9,804 / 9,804 / $671,618
June 12, 2011	Austin	United States	Frank Erwin Center	10,525 / 10,525 / $693,912
June 14, 2011	El Paso	United States	Don Haskins Center	6,338 / 6,338 / $428,500
June 16, 2011	Phoenix	United States	U.S. Airways Center	12,472 / 10,777 / $713,851
June 18, 2011	San Diego	United States	Cricket Wireless Amphitheatre	11,183 / 9,912 / $606,918
June 20, 2011	Los Angeles	United States	Gibson Amphitheatre	5,801 / 5,697 / $644,724
June 22, 2011	Los Angeles	United States	Gibson Amphitheatre	5,801 / 5,697 / $644,724
June 24, 2011	Paradise	United States	MGM Grand Garden Arena	N/A
June 26, 2011	Concord	United States	Sleep Train Pavilion	N/A
June 28, 2011	Ridgefield	United States	Sleep Country Amphitheatre	9,356 / 9,356 / $417,903
June 30, 2011	Vancouver	Canada	Rogers Arena	N/A
July 2, 2011	George	United States	Gorge Amphitheatre	12,206 / 11,911 / $748,934

=== Cancellations/postponements ===
The show on July 7, 2010 in Chicago at the Charter One Pavilion was postponed due to inclement weather. It was rescheduled for August 23, 2010. Fans attending the August 23, 2010 makeup show received an embroidered Rush baseball cap with "The Rain Date – Chicago 2010" on the back. Prior to kicking off the second leg of the tour, the band announced that they would be postponing the April 1, 2011 Greensboro, North Carolina show a day later and as a result, they would move the April 6, 2011 show in Toledo, Ohio to April 13, 2011.
