= Latch Key Kid =

American singer-songwriter

Background information
- Born: July 18, 1976 (age 49)
- Origin: Manhattan Beach, California, US
- Genres: Pop, rock, folk, alternative
- Occupations: Singer-songwriter, guitarist
- Instruments: Singing, guitar, piano, drums, harmonica, mandolin, bass
- Labels: Shadowmind Studios, Experience Records
- Website: www.latchkeykid.org

Gavin Heaney (born July 18, 1976) (professionally known as Latch Key Kid) is an American singer-songwriter from Manhattan Beach, California. His albums include the self-titled Latch Key Kid, released on September 21, 2005; Miracle Mile, released on January 23, 2008; All Becomes One, released on January 22, 2009; and Live & Acoustic, released on October 19, 2009.

== Biography ==
Born and raised in Manhattan Beach, California, Heaney attended Mira Costa High School and went to University of California, Santa Barbara, where he lived for about four years before moving back to Manhattan Beach.

As Latch Key Kid, he created his own signature sound by playing the guitar, bass, piano, drums, mandolin, and harmonica on his recordings. According to Billboard, Heaney's biggest strengths are that he "produces, plays multiple instruments, is stylistically diverse... His live show has been marketable, too." Inspirations include music from the 1960s such as The Beatles, Stevie Wonder, and Simon and Garfunkel. He has been described as "writing songs that are like smiles".

His song "Good Times" was used in the opening of the DreamWorks film I Love You, Man, and was included in the Lakeshore Records soundtrack of the film. A music video for the song was directed by Joey Boukadakis. The song was also used in the advertisements of Australian drama Packed to the Rafters and a 2008 Coca-Cola commercial entitled "Jinx" that first aired during Super Bowl XLII. The cola ad was considered, "A close second to Kina Grannis in terms of worldwide coming-out parties" for new artists. "The spot, featuring Democrat James Carville and Republican Bill Frist cavorting together, perfectly fit the mood of the cheery ditty about sharing good times with good friends."

"Good Times" and "Almost Anything" were used in the promos for the second season of the Australian TV show Packed to the Rafters and was featured in the Packed to the Rafters Soundtrack Volume 2. "Good Times" has also been used on Dancing with the Stars Australia and in the trailer for the Warner Brothers film The Invention of Lying. In October 2009, "Good Times" was featured in a one-minute short film entitled Dave Knoll Finds His Soul, featuring Masi Oka and directed by Milo Ventimiglia. The short was made for the Responsibility Project, a joint initiative of NBC and Liberty Mutual Group. The short aired during the Heroes episode "Hysterical Blindness" on October 12, 2009.

Hearney's 2009 album, All Becomes One, was released in Australia and New Zealand through Warner Music Australia. The track "Last Song" was used in Skyrunners, a Disney XD Original Movie that premiered on November 27, 2009.

== Charity ==
Latch Key Kid is an advocate for a variety of causes, working with Music for Relief and The Surfrider Foundation, among others.

== Discography ==
=== Albums ===
- Latch Key Kid (2005)
- Miracle Mile (2008)
- All Becomes One (2009)
- Live & Acoustic (2009)
- Latch Key Kid Redux (2010)
- Wide Open (2010)
- Mountain Songs (2011)

=== Singles ===
- 2008: "Good Times"
- 2008: "This World Keeps Turning"
- 2009: "Christmas Everyday"
- 2010: "It Might Be Love" (Duet with Lindsay Ray)
- 2010: "Wide Open"
- 2014: "Before I Fall" (with Sami Freeman)

=== Soundtracks ===
- 2009: I Love You, Man
- 2009: Packed to the Rafters Volume 2
- 2010: Degrassi Takes Manhattan
