= Clockwork Angels =

Studio album by Rush
- Released: June 8, 2012 (Note: Australian release date, released in North America on June 12 and in Europe on June 13.)
- Recorded: April 2010, (Note: "BU2B" and "Caravan") October–December 2011
- Studios: Blackbird (Nashville, Tennessee); Revolution (Toronto, Ontario)
- Genres: Hard rock; progressive rock
- Length: 66:04
- Label: Roadrunner
- Producers: Rush; Nick Raskulinecz

Rush chronology
Time Machine 2011: Live in Cleveland (2011)	Clockwork Angels (2012)	Clockwork Angels Tour (2013)

Singles from Clockwork Angels
- 1. "Caravan"/"BU2B" Released: June 1, 2010; 2. "Headlong Flight" Released: April 19, 2012; 3. "The Wreckers" Released: July 25, 2012; 4. "The Anarchist" Released: February 20, 2013; 5. "The Garden" Released: April 20, 2013

Clockwork Angels is the nineteenth and final studio album by Canadian rock band Rush, released on June 8, 2012, on Roadrunner Records. During the band's short break following its Snakes & Arrows Tour, the group decided to write a new studio album. Most of the album was recorded between October and December 2011 at Revolution Recording in Toronto, Ontario, Canada. It is the final album with drummer and lyricist Neil Peart before his death in 2020 and the final album before the band's initial dissolution from 2015 to 2025.

Two songs that would eventually appear on the album, "Caravan" and "BU2B", were recorded in April 2010, and had been released to radio stations and made available as a digital download on June 1, 2010. Following the release of the two songs, the band embarked on the Time Machine Tour, with "Caravan" and "BU2B" included in the set list. Clockwork Angels was completed following this tour. The album's second single, "Headlong Flight", was released April 19, 2012. The album's third single, "The Wreckers", was released July 25, 2012. On February 20, 2013, "The Anarchist" was released as the fourth and final single. A 10" picture disc single of the song "The Garden" was released as part of the 2013 Record Store Day Black Friday sale, limited to 3,000 copies.

The album debuted at No. 1 in Canada and at No. 2 on the Billboard 200 chart. The album won the award for Rock Album of the Year at the 2013 Juno Awards.

== Background and writing ==
At the end of the band's Snakes & Arrows Tour in July 2008, the group took a year-and-a-half long break; during this break, Rush released the live albums Snakes & Arrows Live (2008) and the compilation Working Men (2009). The band reconvened in Los Angeles in December 2009 to discuss what projects they wanted to undertake in the coming year. Among their options were to start a new studio album and to undergo a major tour; as Neil Peart later wrote: "Fools that we are, we ended up doing both." The idea of an album with a back story as opposed to a collection of different songs became an attractive one to the group, for which Peart detailed one set in a fictional world with a suite of songs telling a story. Rush had worked on new material as early as February 2009, but Alex Lifeson denied a speculation that they were set to make a concept album at that time.

Rush adopted the band's usual songwriting methods which involved Geddy Lee and Lifeson working on music at their home studios in Toronto while Peart worked alone from his California home on the lyrics. The group had encouraged one another to become more spontaneous with their solos in live performance which became a primary element while writing new music for Clockwork Angels. Lifeson had to consciously hold himself back from layering guitar tracks as he wanted to emphasize the "basic rockiness of the songs" and resorted to greater use of double tracking. The sessions were productive; in March 2010, Lee said: "Just about a month and a half ago we had no songs. And now we've been writing and now we've got about six songs that we just love" and Lifeson predicted a spring 2011 release.

After some weeks into the writing Peart had developed his story further, leading to the band's agreement to adapt it into a concept album while having each track make its own statement. Rush had previously recorded conceptual songs throughout their career, but had yet to commit to a full album concept. Lee was apprehensive towards the idea at first as he wanted the group to move forward in direction and not adopt something typical of fellow progressive rock bands of the 1970s. Music Radar wrote that despite the story-based theme, the album fails to get weighed down by the plot. In a change of pace, Peart wrote the lyrics to Clockwork Angels on a blank canvas without using any preconceived ideas that he had written down. Early in January 2010, Peart had written some ideas and sent them to Lee and Lifeson, who then paired the words to the pieces of music that they had come up with. Peart was influenced to devise a story and lyrics set in a dystopian steampunk-inspired world "lit only by fire", named after the same-titled book on the history of the Middle Ages by William Manchester and "driven by steam, intricate clockworks, and alchemy". He had incorporated elements of ancient tradition with Tarot cards on Vapor Trails (2002) and the ancient Hindi game leela on Snakes & Arrows and wanted to bring in alchemy for Clockwork Angels. Peart wrote a lyrical "chapter" for each of the album's twelve tracks, representing the mood or atmosphere of each track with its own symbol as depicted in the artwork. The plot is based on various sources such as Candide by Voltaire "with nods to" the novel The Sot-Weed Factor (1960) by John Barth and writers Michael Ondaatje, Joseph Conrad, Robertson Davies, Herbert Gold, Daphne du Maurier, and Cormac McCarthy, and early Spanish explorers in the American Southwest for the Seven Cities of Gold myth.

Development paused in April 2010 when Rush announced the band's Time Machine Tour; this tour was initially set to run from June to October of that year. The tour saw Rush perform two new songs that they had written for Clockwork Angels entitled "Caravan" and "BU2B". They had also written "The Garden" and "The Anarchist" at that point. With the first half of the Time Machine Tour finished, Lee and Lifeson resumed to write the rest of the album in early 2011, but the sessions had not produced strong enough results barring some "furious jams" that became the basis of "Carnies" and "Headlong Flight". There was also difficulty in matching Peart's lyrics to the new music which resulted in many rewrites, some on the day of recording via e-mail. Lifeson later complimented Peart: "Neil came through – he never complained."

In August 2010, Lifeson remarked that the album was turning out to be very musically diverse. In particular, Lifeson referred to the nearly finished title track "Clockwork Angels" as an "epic song" and a "multi-parted piece", described as "very dynamic". Peart said of the still in-work album in May 2011, "I intend it to be my highest achievement lyrically and drumming-wise." When the final writing sessions began in late 2011, Lee and Lifeson decided to swap instruments at one particular meeting. The result was what became "The Wreckers".

Clockwork Angels contains string arrangements composed of six violins and two cellos. During the album tour, concert sound mixer Brad Madix faced gain-before-feedback challenges when amplifying the strings for a large audience: "I'd worked with strings in the past, but it was always either in a very quiet setting with minimal sound reinforcement or the violins were strictly electric. On Rush's Clockwork Angels Tour, the band definitely meant for the strings to be featured and acoustic."

Though the band's 1976 and 1978 albums 2112 and Hemispheres are often referred to as concept albums, Clockwork Angels is the band's only true concept album as the album features a continuous theme with the lyrics telling a story that runs from beginning to end. Caress of Steel, 2112 and Hemispheres all feature a sidelong suite that tells a story. However, the lyrics of the other songs on those three albums have very little if anything to do with those stories.

== Production ==
=== Recording ===
Rush recorded Clockwork Angels in two phases. The first took place in April 2010 at Blackbird Studios in Nashville, Tennessee with Nick Raskulinecz returning as co-producer following his work on Snakes & Arrows (2007). The tracks "Caravan" and "BU2B" were recorded during this time and mixing was completed by Richard Chycki at the Sound Kitchen in Franklin, Tennessee. The band's initial plan was to return to the studio at the conclusion of the Time Machine Tour in October 2010 and have the album finished for a 2011 release. However, they decided to extend the tour with dates from March to July 2011, thus pushing back the release of Clockwork Angels. That August, the band announced their deal with Roadrunner Records in partnership with their domestic label Anthem Records to handle their international distribution, marking the end of their time with Atlantic Records which began with Presto (1989).

The second phase of recording took place at Revolution Recording in Toronto between October and December 2011. The strings were recorded at Ocean Way Recording in Los Angeles in January 2012.

On his personal website, Peart revealed that he took a new approach in writing and recording his drum tracks for the album:

I played through each song just a few times on my own, checking out patterns and fills that might work, then called in Booujzhe. He stood in the room with me, facing my drums, with a music stand and a single drumstick—he was my conductor, and I was his orchestra ... I would attack the drums, responding to his enthusiasm, and his suggestions between takes, and together we would hammer out the basic architecture of the part. His baton would conduct me into choruses, half-time bridges, and double-time outros and so on—so I didn't have to worry about their durations. No counting, and no endless repetition.

=== Novels ===
On February 9, 2012, science fiction novelist Kevin J. Anderson, a longtime friend of Neil Peart, announced that he would be writing a novelization of Clockwork Angels. He also revealed information about the album's concept:

In a young man's quest to follow his dreams, he is caught between the grandiose forces of order and chaos. He travels across a lavish and colorful world of steampunk and alchemy, with lost cities, pirates, anarchists, exotic carnivals, and a rigid Watchmaker who imposes precision on every aspect of daily life.

Released on September 4, 2012, the novel was followed by a loose sequel titled Clockwork Lives, which was published on September 15, 2015, followed by a graphic novel in 2018. During the final years of his life, Peart began working with Anderson on a third and final novel in the series; after Peart's death, his widow gave Anderson permission to continue the project. This book, Clockwork Destiny, was published in June 2022.

=== Artwork ===
The album's front cover, designed by Rush's longtime collaborator Hugh Syme, depicts a clock marked with alchemical symbols instead of numbers. It displays the time as 9:12, which in 24-hour time in the evening is 21:12, a reference to the band's fourth studio album, 2112 (1976). Coincidentally, Peart's birthday was September 12, which can be written as 9/12.

== Release and reception ==
Professional ratings
Aggregate scores
Source	Rating
Metacritic	74/100
Review scores
Source	Rating
AllMusic	4/5 stars
The Austin Chronicle	2/5 stars
The A.V. Club	A−
Blabbermouth.net	8/10
Consequence of Sound	4/5 stars
The Guardian	4/5 stars
Metal Hammer	7/7 stars
Now	4/5 stars
PopMatters	7/10 stars
Rolling Stone	3.5/5 stars

Clockwork Angels was released on June 8, 2012, in Australia, followed by the United States and Canada on June 12 and in Europe on June 13. British magazine Classic Rock released a limited edition fan pack containing the album and 132-page magazine on June 11.

The single "Caravan" was released June 1, 2010, to radio stations and made available for digital download at this time along with "BU2B". The second single, "Headlong Flight", was released to radio stations and for online streaming on April 19, 2012.

The album debuted at No. 2 on the Billboard 200 with sales of 103,000 units the first week. In Canada, the album debuted at No. 1 with sales of 20,000 units. By June 20, over 40,000 copies of the Classic Rock fan pack had been sold. Had this release been eligible for the UK Albums Chart, the album would have debuted at No. 1. As more people bought the fan pack than the album alone, the latter debuted at No. 76 in the UK before it reached its peak at No. 21.

Clockwork Angels holds a score of 74 out of 100 on Metacritic based on 14 reviews, which indicates "generally favourable reviews". Classic Rock scored the album a 9/10 and called it Rush's best release in 30 years. Jamie Thompson of The Guardian wrote in his review that "those who worship at the temple of Rush will be in raptures; for those who remain agnostic, there may well be enough here to justify a leap of faith". Brave Words & Bloody Knuckles editor-in-chief Martin Popoff gave the album a perfect 10/10 and said of it, "one can't deny that there's more purpose and focus here than on any Rush album ever".

In 2019, Classic Rock named Clockwork Angels the number one album of the 2010s.

== Track listing ==
All lyrics are written by Neil Peart; all music is composed by Geddy Lee and Alex Lifeson.

No.	Title	Length
1.	"Caravan"	5:39
2.	"BU2B"	5:10
3.	"Clockwork Angels"	7:31
4.	"The Anarchist"	6:52
5.	"Carnies"	4:53
6.	"Halo Effect"	3:14
7.	"Seven Cities of Gold"	6:32
8.	"The Wreckers"	5:01
9.	"Headlong Flight"	7:19
10.	"BU2B2"	1:28
11.	"Wish Them Well"	5:25
12.	"The Garden"	6:59
Total length:		66:03

== Personnel ==
Credits adapted from the album's liner notes.

Rush

- Geddy Lee – bass guitar, keyboards, bass pedals, vocals
- Alex Lifeson – guitars, keyboards
- Neil Peart – drums, cymbals, tambourine

Additional musicians

- David Campbell – string arrangement and conducting
- Jason Sniderman – piano on "The Garden"

Production

- Arranged and produced by Rush and Nick Raskulinecz
- Recording engineers: Richard Chycki, Martin Cooke, Jason DuFour, Paul Fig and Stephen Koszler
- Mixed by Nick Raskulinecz
- Mastered by Brian Gardner

== Charts ==
=== Weekly charts ===
2012–2013 weekly chart performance for Clockwork Angels
Chart (2012–2013)	Peak position
Austrian Albums (Ö3 Austria)	57
Belgian Albums (Ultratop Flanders)	55
Belgian Albums (Ultratop Wallonia)	65
Canadian Albums (Billboard)	1
Dutch Albums (Album Top 100)	11
Finnish Albums (Suomen virallinen lista)	4
French Albums (SNEP)	173
German Albums (Offizielle Top 100)	11
Hungarian Albums (MAHASZ)	32
Italian Albums (FIMI)	33
Japanese Albums (Oricon)	27
Norwegian Albums (VG-lista)	4
Scottish Albums (Official Charts)	16
Spanish Albums (Promusicae)	58
Swedish Albums (Sverigetopplistan)	8
Swiss Albums (Schweizer Hitparade)	21
UK Albums (Official Charts)	21
UK Rock & Metal Albums (Official Charts)	19
US Billboard 200	2
US Top Hard Rock Albums (Billboard)	1
US Top Rock Albums (Billboard)	1

=== Year-end charts ===
Year-end chart performance for Clockwork Angels
Chart (2012)	Position
US Billboard 200	114
US Top Rock Albums (Billboard)	31

== Certifications ==
Certifications for Clockwork Angels
Region	Certification	Certified units/sales
Canada (Music Canada)	Gold	40,000^{^}
^{^} Shipments figures based on certification alone.
