= R40 Live Tour =

2015 concert tour by Rush

- Tour by Rush
- Location: North America
- Start date: May 8, 2015
- End date: August 1, 2015
- Legs: 1
- No. of shows: 35

Rush concert chronology
- Clockwork Angels Tour (2012–2013); R40 Live Tour (2015); Fifty Something (2026–2027)

The R40 Live Tour was a concert tour by Canadian rock band Rush that commemorated the 40th anniversary of drummer Neil Peart joining the band in July 1974. The title hearkens back to Rush's 2004 R30: 30th Anniversary Tour that celebrated the 30th anniversary of the band. The tour grossed US$37.8 million, with 442,337 tickets sold at 35 concerts. Although the tour was shorter than many of Rush’s preceding tours, it was very successful in terms of average concert attendance and gross, which was 12,638 and US$1,080,000 respectively. The tour also saw more sellouts than any other Rush tour in recent memory. With 26 out of the 33 reported shows being sellouts, and the remaining 7 still over 90% capacity, the band felt a taste of their success from their prime years again. This was Rush's final tour with Peart before his death in 2020, and their last one before dissolving for ten years.

While their set list was intended to represent their discography in reverse order, no songs from the EP Feedback (2004) or the albums Test for Echo (1996), Presto (1989), Hold Your Fire (1987), or Power Windows (1985) were performed for the duration of the tour.

== Films ==
The shows performed on June 17 and 19, 2015, at the Air Canada Centre in Toronto were filmed and released as the concert film R40 Live on November 20, 2015. A documentary titled Rush: Time Stand Still was released in November 2016, dealing with the band's preparations for the tour and their experiences during it. The film was narrated by Paul Rudd and directed by Dale Heslip.

== Live album ==
Rush recorded two of their shows in June in Toronto for a live album released on November 20, 2015. They also recorded "The Wreckers" in Buffalo, NY at the show on June 10, 2015 for the album, as well as "The Camera Eye" at the show in Kansas City, MO on July 9, 2015. The live album R40 Live reached number one on Billboard Top Rock Albums chart.

== Book ==
Neil Peart released a book about the tour titled Far and Wide: Bring That Horizon to Me! on September 13, 2015.

== Set list ==
=== First set ===
"The World Is... The World Is" (video introduction)

1. "The Anarchist"/"Clockwork Angels" (only on May 8 in Tulsa, Oklahoma)
2. "Clockwork Angels"/"The Wreckers"†
3. "Headlong Flight" (with "Drumbastica", Neil Peart drum solo)
4. "Far Cry"
5. "The Main Monkey Business"
6. "One Little Victory"/"How It Is"
7. "Animate"
8. "Roll the Bones"
9. "Distant Early Warning"/"Between the Wheels"
10. "Losing It"†
11. "Subdivisions"

=== Second set ===
"No Country for Old Hens" (video introduction)

1. "Tom Sawyer"
2. "Red Barchetta"/"The Camera Eye"/"YYZ"
3. "The Spirit of Radio"
4. "Natural Science" (only when "YYZ" was performed)
5. "Jacob's Ladder"
6. "Cygnus X-1 Book II: Hemispheres"
  1. "Prelude"
7. "Cygnus X-1 Book I: The Voyage"
  1. "Prologue"
  2. "Part 1"
  3. "The Story So Far" (Neil Peart drum solo)
  4. "Part 3"
8. "Closer to the Heart"
9. "Xanadu"
10. "2112"
  I. "Overture"
  II. "The Temples of Syrinx"
  IV. "Presentation"
  VII. "Grand Finale"

=== Encore ===
"Mel's Rock Pile" starring Eugene Levy (video introduction)

1. "Lakeside Park"
2. "Anthem"
3. "What You're Doing"
4. "Working Man" (featuring intro excerpt of "Garden Road")

"Exit Stage Left" (video outro)

† "Clockwork Angels" / "The Wreckers" were not played June 19 in Toronto, June 27 in Newark, New Jersey, June 29 in New York, New York, July 17 in Vancouver, BC and August 1 in Los Angeles, California. At those five shows, they were replaced by "Losing It," which was played prior to "Subdivisions."

== Tour dates ==
List of 2015 concerts
| Date | City | Country | Venue | Attendance | Revenue |
|---|---|---|---|---|---|
| May 8, 2015 | Tulsa | United States | BOK Center | 9,830 / 10,355 | $817,400 |
| May 10, 2015 | Lincoln | United States | Pinnacle Bank Arena | 9,357 / 10,280 | $654,434 |
| May 12, 2015 | Saint Paul | United States | Xcel Energy Center | 11,835 / 11,835 | $973,166 |
| May 14, 2015 | St. Louis | United States | Scottrade Center | 13,096 / 13,096 | $1,092,824 |
| May 16, 2015 | Austin | United States | Austin360 Amphitheater | 12,898 / 12,898 | $791,645 |
| May 18, 2015 | Dallas | United States | American Airlines Center | 13,320 / 13,320 | $1,032,215 |
| May 20, 2015 | Houston | United States | Toyota Center | 11,202 / 11,202 | $1,046,297 |
| May 22, 2015 | New Orleans | United States | Smoothie King Center | 10,786 / 11,547 | $884,926 |
| May 24, 2015 | Tampa | United States | Amalie Arena | 13,914 / 13,914 | $1,176,535 |
| May 26, 2015 | Alpharetta | United States | Verizon Wireless Amphitheatre at Encore Park | 11,500 / 11,500 | —N/a |
| May 28, 2015 | Greensboro | United States | Greensboro Coliseum | 10,861 / 11,135 | $895,380 |
| May 30, 2015 | Bristow | United States | Jiffy Lube Live | 16,579 / 16,579 | $1,094,711 |
| June 8, 2015 | Columbus | United States | Nationwide Arena | 14,079 / 14,079 | $1,076,164 |
| June 10, 2015 | Buffalo | United States | First Niagara Center | 13,913 / 13,913 | $1,132,154 |
| June 12, 2015 | Chicago | United States | United Center | 14,256 / 14,256 | $1,450,746 |
| June 14, 2015 | Auburn Hills | United States | The Palace of Auburn Hills | 13,083 / 13,083 | $1,092,767 |
| June 17, 2015 | Toronto | Canada | Air Canada Centre | 28,364 / 28,364 | $2,541,984 |
| June 19, 2015 | Toronto | Canada | Air Canada Centre | 28,364 / 28,364 | $2,541,984 |
| June 21, 2015 | Montreal | Canada | Centre Bell | 13,024 / 13,024 | $939,304 |
| June 23, 2015 | Boston | United States | TD Garden | 12,953 / 12,953 | $1,232,122 |
| June 25, 2015 | Philadelphia | United States | Wells Fargo Center | 13,476 / 13,476 | $1,340,006 |
| June 27, 2015 | Newark | United States | Prudential Center | 12,483 / 12,483 | $1,289,222 |
| June 29, 2015 | New York City | United States | Madison Square Garden | 13,554 / 13,554 | $1,507,393 |
| July 9, 2015 | Kansas City | United States | Sprint Center | 10,629 / 10,736 | $914,828 |
| July 11, 2015 | Denver | United States | Pepsi Center | 12,681 / 12,681 | $1,119,150 |
| July 13, 2015 | West Valley City | United States | Maverik Center | 9,564 / 10,156 | $805,899 |
| July 15, 2015 | Calgary | Canada | Scotiabank Saddledome | —N/a | —N/a |
| July 17, 2015 | Vancouver | Canada | Rogers Arena | —N/a | —N/a |
| July 19, 2015 | Seattle | United States | KeyArena | 11,933 / 11,933 | $1,055,071 |
| July 21, 2015 | Portland | United States | Moda Center | 12,684 / 12,684 | $971,350 |
| July 23, 2015 | San Jose | United States | SAP Center at San Jose | 12,534 / 12,534 | $1,210,279 |
| July 25, 2015 | Las Vegas | United States | MGM Grand Garden Arena | 13,434 / 13,434 | $1,401,719 |
| July 27, 2015 | Phoenix | United States | US Airways Center | 12,282 / 12,551 | $944,212 |
| July 30, 2015 | Irvine | United States | Irvine Meadows Amphitheatre | 14,933 / 14,933 | $1,042,380 |
| August 1, 2015 | Inglewood | United States | The Forum | 12,894 / 12,894 | $1,406,214 |
