= Leela (game) =

Board game with origins in ancient India

- Players: 2+
- Setup time: about 1 minute

Leela or Lila is a board game with origins in ancient India. The original game was created by Hindu scholars with the intention of teaching moral values, and was a precursor to the modern game snakes and ladders.

== Details ==
Leela (or Lila) was designed to be a game of life that provides insight into human consciousness and a key to divine knowledge. One or more are able to play Leela (or Lila) by using the game board and book, a die, and a significant item that belongs to the player. One example of an item that can be used is a ring. This item serves as the player's symbol during the game.

== See also ==
- Gyan chauper
- Snakes and Ladders
