= List of Rush instrumentals =

The Canadian rock band Rush wrote, recorded, and performed several instrumentals throughout its career.

== Studio recordings ==
=== La Villa Strangiato ===
"La Villa Strangiato"

Instrumental by Rush

from the album Hemispheres
- Released: October 24, 1978
- Genre: Progressive rock; hard rock; jazz fusion
- Length: 9:37
- Label: Anthem (Canada); Mercury
- Producers: Rush and Terry Brown

Rush singles chronology
"Cygnus X-1 Book II: Hemispheres" (1978)	"La Villa Strangiato" (1978)	"Natural Science" (1980)

Music video
- "La Villa Strangiato" on YouTube

"La Villa Strangiato" was released on the 1978 album Hemispheres, and is subtitled "An Exercise in Self-Indulgence". The 9:37 song, the fourth and final track of the album, was Rush's first entirely instrumental piece. The multi-part piece was inspired by a dream guitarist Alex Lifeson had, and the music in these sections correspond to the occurrences in his dream. The opening segment was played on a nylon-string classical guitar. The next segment introduces the main theme of La Villa, the Strangiato theme. The song progresses to include an increasingly complex guitar solo backed by string synthesizer, followed closely by bass and drum fills. The Strangiato theme is then revisited before the song ends abruptly with phased bass and drums. The piece is divided as follows:

- I: "Buenas Noches, Mein Froinds!" (0:00–0:26)
- II: "To sleep, perchance to dream..." (0:27–1:59)
- III: "Strangiato Theme" (2:00–3:15)
- IV: "A Lerxst in Wonderland" (3:16–5:48)
- V: "Monsters!" (5:49–6:09)
- VI: "The Ghost of the Aragon" (6:10–6:44)
- VII: "Danforth and Pape" (6:45–7:25)
- VIII: "The Waltz of the Shreves" (7:26–7:51)
- IX: "Never turn your back on a Monster!" (7:52–8:02)
- X: "Monsters! (Reprise)" (8:03–8:16)
- XI: "Strangiato Theme (Reprise)" (8:17–9:20)
- XII: "A Farewell to Things" (9:20–9:37)

Live versions of "La Villa Strangiato" have often featured altered sections. For instance, on Exit... Stage Left, Lee sings part of a Yiddish nursery rhyme over "Danforth and Pape" (the liner notes include a translation of his words) and adds a short bass solo during "Monsters! (Reprise)." During later tours, as documented on Rush in Rio and the Blu-ray release of R30, a drum/bass vamp was inserted before "Strangiato Theme (Reprise)," over which Lifeson sang nonsense or made a stream of consciousness rant. The classical guitar introduction was either played on electric guitar or, more commonly, cut out altogether. During the 2010–2011 Time Machine Tour, the piece began with a polka rendition of "To sleep, perchance to dream," then transitioned into the original arrangement.

The band set out to record the song in one take; however, it ultimately required three separate takes. According to Lee, "We spent more time recording 'Strangiato' than the entire Fly by Night album. It was our first piece without any vocals at all. So each section had to stand up with a theme and musical structure of its own."

The segments titled "Monsters!" and "Monsters! (Reprise)" are an adaptation of Raymond Scott's popular composition "Powerhouse". Although the statute of limitations for copyright infringement had expired by the time Scott's publishers attempted to take legal action, the band paid some monetary compensation to him and his wife, feeling an ethical obligation to do so.

In 2018, Lee said of the piece:

That was a song where I would have to say our ideas exceeded our ability to play them. We thought: "We're going to write this long piece and then we'll just record it live off the floor and boom!"

But it was really difficult. It was beyond us. I included it here because it surprised me how popular that song was among our fans. They just love it when we go into that crazy mode.

Yes, it is an indulgence, but it seemed to be a pivotal moment for us in creating a fan base that wanted us to be that way.

"La Villa Strangiato" translates roughly to "The Strange Village" or "Weird City".

Drummer Neil Peart said of "La Villa Strangiato":

This is Alex's brain, and every section of that song is different dreams that Alex would tell us about and we'd be, "stop, stop." It was these bizarre dreams that he would insist on telling you every detail about, so it became a joke between Geddy and me. "La Villa Strangiato" means strange city, and there was so much going on in that. There's also a big band section in there, which was absolutely for me because I always wanted to play that approach. And cartoon music. We got in trouble later because we used music from a cartoon from the 1930s.

Rolling Stone readers voted the piece number 9 on their list of The Top 10 Rush songs.

Classic Rock ranked the instrumental number 2 on their list of The 50 Greatest Rush Songs Ever.

=== YYZ ===
From the Moving Pictures album. "YYZ" (natively pronounced why-why-zed) is the airport code for the Toronto Pearson International Airport, and the instrumental opens with a rhythm in 10/8 that is Morse code for "YYZ" (-.-- -.-- --..). The piece evolved into a drum/bass solo during the 1980s. "YYZ" was the first of six Rush songs (over three decades) to be nominated for a Grammy in the category of Best Rock Instrumental Performance. The song was a live performance staple, having been played on every one of the band's concert tours since its release, except the Roll the Bones Tour.

=== Where's My Thing? ===
"Where's My Thing? (Part IV, "Gangster of Boats" Trilogy)"

Song by Rush

from the album Roll the Bones
- Released: September 3, 1991
- Recorded: 1991
- Genre: Funk rock
- Length: 3:49
- Label: Anthem Records (Canada); Anthem/Atlantic
- Producers: Rupert Hine and Rush

From the Roll the Bones album, "Where's My Thing?" was Rush's second song nominated for a Grammy, losing to Eric Johnson's "Cliffs of Dover". The song has a pop-oriented feel, featuring an upbeat tempo and a brass-like synthesizer line. On the original album, it is humorously subtitled "Part IV: 'Gangster of Boats' Trilogy." The song was performed on the Roll the Bones Tour and did not appear in concert again until the 2012 Clockwork Angels Tour, with an added drum solo. This version of the song was titled "Where's My Thing?/Here It Is!" on the live album Clockwork Angels Tour.

=== Leave That Thing Alone ===
"Leave That Thing Alone"

Song by Rush

from the album Counterparts
- Released: October 19, 1993
- Recorded: 1993
- Genre: Progressive rock, Funk rock
- Length: 4:06
- Label: Anthem (Canada); Mercury
- Producers: Peter Collins and Rush

From the Counterparts album. During the Counterparts, Test for Echo, and Vapor Trails tours, and featured on the Different Stages and Rush in Rio live albums, "Leave That Thing Alone" preceded Peart's drum solo and was played with an extended ending to showcase Lee's bass work. It was then omitted from the set lists until 2010's Time Machine Tour.

This track was the third song nominated for a Grammy in the category of Best Rock Instrumental Performance in 1994, losing to Pink Floyd's "Marooned."

=== Limbo ===
"Limbo"

Song by Rush

from the album Test for Echo
- Released: September 10, 1996
- Recorded: 1996
- Genre: Progressive rock
- Length: 5:28
- Label: Anthem (Canada); Mercury
- Producers: Peter Collins and Rush

From the Test for Echo album. "Limbo" features vocals by Lee; however, he does not sing any lyrics. The song includes spoken samples from Bobby "Boris" Pickett's novelty song "Monster Mash." The song was only performed live on the Test for Echo Tour.

=== The Main Monkey Business, Hope, and Malignant Narcissism ===
The studio album Snakes & Arrows is the only one to feature multiple instrumental tracks: "The Main Monkey Business", "Hope", and "Malignant Narcissism". "The Main Monkey Business" clocks in at 6 minutes and 1 second, making it Rush's second longest instrumental, the longest being "La Villa Strangiato". Drummer Neil Peart remarked that it took him three days to learn the song. The other two songs, "Hope" and "Malignant Narcissism", are two of the shortest songs ever recorded by Rush, both being just over two minutes long. "Hope" is a solo guitar piece written by Lifeson. "Malignant Narcissism" features Lee playing a fretless bass and Peart on a four-piece drum kit. "Malignant Narcissism" contains a spoken sample, "Usually a case of malignant narcissism brought on during childhood," from the movie Team America: World Police. "Malignant Narcissism" became the fifth Rush instrumental to be nominated for a Grammy under the category of Best Rock Instrumental Performance, in 2008, losing to Bruce Springsteen's "Once Upon A Time In The West". A live recording of "Hope" from the album Songs for Tibet: The Art of Peace became the sixth Rush instrumental to be nominated for a Grammy under the category of Best Rock Instrumental Performance in 2009. It lost to Zappa Plays Zappa's "Peaches en Regalia".

== Live performances and recordings ==
=== Broon's Bane ===
"Broon's Bane"

Song by Rush

from the album Exit...Stage Left
- Released: October 29, 1981
- Genre: Classical guitar
- Length: 1:37
- Label: Anthem (Canada); Mercury
- Producer: Terry Brown

Found on the Exit... Stage Left live album, "Broon's Bane" is a short classical guitar piece written and performed by Lifeson as an extended intro to "The Trees". The song is named after Terry Brown, nicknamed "Broon" by the band, who produced Exit... Stage Left and 10 other Rush albums. (On the same album, Lee refers to Brown as "T.C. Broonsie" when introducing "Jacob's Ladder."). Although in a different key than "The Trees", it closes on a D minor chord which immediately brightens with the start of "The Trees" and its opening D major chord.

=== Cygnus X-1 (live recordings) ===
On the live album Rush in Rio, an abridged version of "Cygnus X-1" is performed as an instrumental. The piece consists of the "Prologue" section of the song, without the spoken introduction. The Moog Taurus synthesizer heard in the studio recording is replaced with a choir-like synthesizer sound.

On the R40 Live Tour, the Prelude of Book II was played, transposed down by one whole step due to Lee's decreased vocal range. Immediately afterward, the band played the first and third parts of Book I as instrumentals, with a Peart drum solo as an interlude between them.

=== R30 Overture ===
"R30 Overture"

Song by Rush

from the album R30: 30th Anniversary World Tour
- Released: November 22, 2005 (North America); November 28, 2005 (Europe)
- Recorded: September 24, 2004
- Genre: Progressive rock, hard rock
- Length: 6:42
- Label: Anthem (Canada); Mercury
- Producers: Francois Lamoureux and Rush

The opening song of Rush's 2004 tour dates featured an instrumental combining sections of one song from each of the band's first six studio albums.

The songs featured in the medley were:

1. "Finding My Way" (Rush)
2. "Anthem" (Fly by Night)
3. "Bastille Day" (Caress of Steel)
4. "A Passage to Bangkok" (2112)
5. "Cygnus X-1: Book 1: The Voyage - Prologue" (A Farewell to Kings)
6. "Cygnus X-1: Book 2: Hemispheres - Prelude" (Hemispheres)

=== O'Malley's Break ===
During the 2010–11 Time Machine Tour, Lifeson would perform a brief 12-string guitar piece (entitled "O'Malley's Break" on the CD and DVD) that segued into "Closer to the Heart." The name is a reference to Officer O'Malley, the character played by Neil Peart in the concert's opening short film, as the guitar solo allowed Peart to take a breather after his drum solo.

=== Peke's Repose ===
During the 2012 Clockwork Angels Tour, Lifeson would play a guitar solo (called "Peke's Repose" on the CD/DVD/BD) that served as an introduction to "Halo Effect". The name is a reference to one of Neil Peart's many nicknames given him by his bandmates, as the guitar solo allowed Peart to take a short breather.

=== Neil Peart's drum solos ===
A staple and highlight of Rush's concerts was a drum solo by Neil Peart. These solos have been featured on every live album released by the band, with the exception of Grace Under Pressure Tour. Some live albums have included the solo as an interlude during a song, such as in "YYZ" on Exit...Stage Left, while others have presented it as a standalone track. On A Show of Hands and Different Stages, the drum solos were titled "The Rhythm Method" (a double entendre with the form of birth control); on Rush in Rio, it was entitled "O Baterista"; and on R30: 30th Anniversary World Tour, it was titled "Der Trommler". On Rush's 2008 live album, Snakes & Arrows Live, it is titled "De Slagwerker," and is coupled with "Malignant Narcissism" on the track-list. "O Baterista" was the fourth song nominated for a Grammy, in 2005, losing to Brian Wilson's "Mrs. O'Leary's Cow". For the 2010 Time Machine Tour, the solo was called "Love 4 Sale," but was renamed "Moto Perpetuo" for the CD and DVD release in November 2011.

The titles "O Baterista", "Der Trommler" and "De Slagwerker" all translate to "The Drummer" in Portuguese, German and Dutch respectively.

All of Peart's drum solos include a basic framework of routines connected by sections of improvisation, leaving each performance unique. The solo was revised for each successive tour, with some routines dropped in favor of newer, more complex ones. From the mid/late-1980s on, Peart utilized MIDI trigger pads to trigger sounds sampled from various pieces of acoustic percussion that would otherwise consume far too much stage area, such as a marimba, harp, temple blocks, triangles, glockenspiel, orchestra bells, tubular bells, timpani and vibra-slap as well as other, more esoteric percussion. Some purely electronic, description-defying sounds were also used. Once Peart began to combine electronic and acoustic percussion, he also started to use a rotating drum riser during performances, allowing him to switch between the two sections of his kit and still face front as he played.

From 1987 until 2007, Peart's solos incorporated marimba portions from one or both of two original compositions: "Pieces of Eight," which first appeared as a flexi disc record in the May 1987 issue of Modern Drummer magazine, and a piece titled "Momo's Dance Party" that appeared as part of his 1996 documentary A Work in Progress. In addition, from 1991 until 2004, a complex pattern from the song "Scars" (on the studio album Presto) was played in the solos. For the Vapor Trails and R30 tours, each solo concluded with a section of the Count Basie standard "One O'Clock Jump," which Peart recorded while producing Burning for Buddy, a two-volume tribute album to legendary big band drummer and bandleader, Buddy Rich. For the Snakes & Arrows Tour, Peart replaced the finale with an excerpt from the Duke Ellington standard "Cotton Tail," which he recorded with the Buddy Rich Band in the mid-1990s. For the Time Machine Tour, Peart again replaced the finale with an excerpt from the Cole Porter standard "Love for Sale," which he also performed with the Buddy Rich Big Band at a 2008 memorial concert. He initially named the solo after that song, calling it "Love 4 Sale," but eventually changed the name to "Moto Perpetuo" for the CD and DVD release in November 2011.

For the Clockwork Angels Tour, Peart played three short drum solos instead of a single long one: an interlude during "Where's My Thing?" in the first set, then an interlude during "Headlong Flight" and a standalone solo before "Red Sector A" in the second. The solos were respectively named "Here It Is!", "Drumbastica," and "The Percussor – (I) Binary Love Theme / (II) Steambanger's Ball" on the tour's live album/DVD release. "The Percussor" is a mainly electronic drum solo dominated by the sounds of triggered samples assigned to many parts of Peart's kit.

For the R40 Live Tour, Peart played two short solos: the "Drumbastica" interlude during "Headlong Flight" in the first set, and an interlude named "The Story So Far" during "Cygnus X-1" in the second.

== See also ==
- List of songs recorded by Rush
