= Clockwork Angels Tour =

2012–2013 concert tour by Rush

- Tour by Rush
- Promotional poster for the tour
- Location: Europe; North America
- Associated album: Clockwork Angels
- Start date: September 7, 2012
- End date: August 4, 2013
- Legs: 2
- No. of shows: 72

Rush concert chronology
- Time Machine Tour (2010–11); Clockwork Angels Tour (2012–13); R40 Live Tour (2015)

The Clockwork Angels Tour was a concert tour in support of the 2012 album, Clockwork Angels, by the Canadian rock band Rush. The tour included shows in Canada, the United States and throughout Europe. A nine-piece string ensemble accompanied the band during the second set of each performance, which highlighted songs from Clockwork Angels.

== Set list ==
Set One

1. "Subdivisions"
2. "The Big Money"
3. "Force Ten"
4. "Grand Designs"
5. "The Body Electric" or "Middletown Dreams" or "Limelight"
6. "Territories"
7. "The Analog Kid"
8. "Bravado" or "The Pass"
9. "Where's My Thing? (Part IV, "Gangster of Boats" Trilogy)/Here It Is! (drum solo)"
10. "Far Cry"

Set Two

1. "Caravan"
2. "Clockwork Angels"
3. "The Anarchist"
4. "Carnies"
5. "The Wreckers"
6. "Headlong Flight/Drumbastica"
7. "Peke's Repose (guitar solo)/Halo Effect"
8. "Seven Cities of Gold" or "Wish Them Well"
9. "The Garden"
10. "Manhattan Project" or "Dreamline"
11. "Red Sector A"
12. "YYZ"
13. "The Spirit of Radio"

Encore

1. "Tom Sawyer"
2. "2112: Overture/The Temples of Syrinx/Grand Finale" or "Working Man"

== Tour dates ==
List of 2012 concerts
Date	City	Country	Venue	Attendance	Revenue
September 7, 2012	Manchester	United States	Verizon Wireless Arena	8,137 / 8,137	$608,383
September 9, 2012	Bristow	United States	Jiffy Lube Live	10,345 / 12,822	$757,162
September 11, 2012	Pittsburgh	United States	Consol Energy Center	8,655 / 10,268	$507,952
September 13, 2012	Indianapolis	United States	Bankers Life Fieldhouse	7,303 / 10,899	$489,034
September 15, 2012	Chicago	United States	United Center	11,307 / 12,130	$1,113,292
September 18, 2012	Auburn Hills	United States	The Palace of Auburn Hills	8,238 / 13,485	$616,595
September 20, 2012	Columbus	United States	Nationwide Arena	8,611 / 10,204	$587,173
September 22, 2012	St. Louis	United States	Scottrade Center	10,772 / 10,942	$790,134
September 24, 2012	Minneapolis	United States	Target Center	8,013 / 10,652	$561,972
September 26, 2012	Winnipeg	Canada	MTS Centre	—N/a	—N/a
September 28, 2012	Saskatoon	Canada	Credit Union Centre	—N/a	—N/a
September 30, 2012	Edmonton	Canada	Rexall Place	—N/a	—N/a
October 10, 2012	Bridgeport	United States	Webster Bank Arena	7,339 / 7,339	$650,355
October 12, 2012	Philadelphia	United States	Wells Fargo Center	11,885 / 12,810	$943,272
October 14, 2012	Toronto	Canada	Air Canada Centre	—N/a	—N/a
October 16, 2012	Toronto	Canada	Air Canada Centre	—N/a	—N/a
October 18, 2012	Montreal	Canada	Centre Bell	—N/a	—N/a
October 20, 2012	Newark	United States	Prudential Center	12,139 / 12,139	$1,022,913
October 22, 2012	New York City	United States	Barclays Center	9,904 / 10,815	$870,736
October 24, 2012	Boston	United States	TD Garden	9,861 / 10,031	$841,953
October 26, 2012	Buffalo	United States	First Niagara Center	13,215 / 13,215	$831,239
October 28, 2012	Cleveland	United States	Quicken Loans Arena	8,025 / 10,383	$594,890
October 30, 2012	Charlotte	United States	Time Warner Cable Arena	7,523 / 10,095	$541,143
November 1, 2012	Alpharetta	United States	Verizon Wireless Amphitheatre	12,086 / 12,086	$926,850
November 3, 2012	Tampa	United States	1-800-ASK-GARY Amphitheatre	10,567 / 11,542	$720,653
November 13, 2012	Seattle	United States	KeyArena	9,793 / 10,199	$823,060
November 15, 2012	San Jose	United States	HP Pavilion at San Jose	10,719 / 10,719	$846,843
November 17, 2012	Anaheim	United States	Honda Center	9,065 / 10,102	$761,265
November 19, 2012	Los Angeles	United States	Gibson Amphitheatre	5,981 / 5,981	$706,342
November 21, 2012	San Diego	United States	Valley View Casino Center	7,065 / 10,101	$359,321
November 23, 2012	Las Vegas	United States	MGM Grand Garden Arena	7,847 / 10,006	$839,405
November 25, 2012	Phoenix	United States	US Airways Center	8,858 / 10,121	$604,667
November 28, 2012	Dallas	United States	American Airlines Center	10,509 / 10,509	$764,483
November 30, 2012	San Antonio	United States	AT&T Center	9,396 / 10,150	$742,544
December 2, 2012	Houston	United States	Toyota Center	11,091 / 11,091	$904,931

List of 2013 concerts
Date	City	Country	Venue	Attendance	Revenue
April 23, 2013	Austin	United States	Frank Erwin Center	5,974 / 10,278	$483,924
April 26, 2013	Sunrise	United States	BankAtlantic Center	6,245 / 7,552	$549,795
April 28, 2013	Orlando	United States	Amway Center	7,783 / 10,142	$623,608
May 1, 2013	Nashville	United States	Bridgestone Arena	7,272 / 9,531	$564,666
May 3, 2013	Raleigh	United States	PNC Arena	7,902 / 8,583	$607,010
May 5, 2013	Virginia Beach	United States	Farm Bureau Live	5,307 / 5,800	$360,608
May 7, 2013	Baltimore	United States	1st Mariner Arena	6,570 / 12,848	$539,231
May 9, 2013	Uncasville	United States	Mohegan Sun Arena	5,258 / 5,556	$480,268
May 11, 2013	Atlantic City	United States	Etess Arena	4,500 / 4,823	$566,630
May 22, 2013	Manchester	England	Manchester Arena	7,806 / 8,898	$771,853
May 24, 2013	London	England	The O_{2} Arena	12,418 / 15,050	$1,216,510
May 26, 2013	Birmingham	England	LG Arena	—N/a	—N/a
May 28, 2013	Sheffield	England	Motorpoint Arena Sheffield	—N/a	—N/a
May 30, 2013	Glasgow	Scotland	Scottish Exhibition and Conference Centre	—N/a	—N/a
June 2, 2013	Amsterdam	Netherlands	Ziggo Dome	—N/a	—N/a
June 4, 2013	Cologne	Germany	Lanxess Arena	—N/a	—N/a
June 6, 2013	Berlin	Germany	O_{2} World Berlin	—N/a	—N/a
June 8, 2013^{[A]}	Sölvesborg	Sweden	Norje Havsbad	—N/a	—N/a
June 10, 2013	Helsinki	Finland	Hartwall Arena	—N/a	—N/a
June 21, 2013	Hershey	United States	Giant Center	7,972 / 8,564	$699,975
June 23, 2013	Wantagh	United States	Nikon at Jones Beach Theater	9,692 / 10,647	$748,560
June 25, 2013	Saratoga Springs	United States	Saratoga Performing Arts Center	7,557 / 8,129	$491,853
June 28, 2013	Tinley Park	United States	First Midwest Bank Amphitheatre	7,626 / 8,382	$657,505
June 30, 2013	Grand Rapids	United States	Van Andel Arena	8,786 / 9,726	$612,081
July 2, 2013	Cincinnati	United States	Riverbend Music Center	9,965 / 10,445	$487,860
July 4, 2013	Milwaukee	United States	Summerfest	14,423 / 22,861	$714,020
July 6, 2013	Hamilton	Canada	Copps Coliseum	—N/a	—N/a
July 8, 2013	Ottawa	Canada	Ottawa Bluesfest	—N/a	—N/a
July 10, 2013	Quebec City	Canada	Quebec City Summer Festival	—N/a	—N/a
July 12, 2013	Halifax	Canada	Halifax Metro Centre	—N/a	—N/a
July 14, 2013	Halifax	Canada	Halifax Metro Centre	—N/a	—N/a
July 24, 2013^{[B]}	Red Deer	Canada	ENMAX Centrium	—N/a	—N/a
July 26, 2013	Vancouver	Canada	Rogers Arena	—N/a	—N/a
July 28, 2013	Ridgefield	United States	Sleep Country Amphitheater	8,552 / 9,214	$482,640
July 31, 2013	West Valley City	United States	USANA Amphitheatre	11,216 / 11,637	$626,706
August 2, 2013	Denver	United States	Pepsi Center	10,409 / 11,266	$816,641
August 4, 2013	Kansas City	United States	Sprint Center	8,450 / 8,789	$654,900

Festivals and other miscellaneous performances

^{A} This concert was a part of "Sweden Rock Festival"

^{B} Concert moved to Red Deer from Calgary due to a flood that damaged the Scotiabank Saddledome.

== Success ==
- Top 200 North American Tours 2012: Rush, #33
- Total Gross: US $27.2 million
- Total Attendance: 340,766
- No. of concerts: 35
- Top 100 North American Mid Year Tours 2013: Rush, #69
- Total Gross: US $4.4 million
- Total Attendance: 55,117
- No. of concerts: 14
- Top 100 Worldwide Mid Year Tours 2013: Rush, #69
- Total Gross: US $11.3 million
- Total Attendance: 127,280
- No. of concerts: 23
- Top 100 Worldwide Tours 2013: Rush, #82
- Total Gross: US $21.2 million
- Total Attendance: 268,252
- No. of concerts: 34

- In summary
- Total Gross: US $48.4 million
- Total Attendance: 609,018
- No. of concerts: 69
