= Caravan (Rush song) =

Single by Rush

from the album Clockwork Angels
- Released: June 1, 2010
- Recorded: April 13, 2010
- Length: 5:40
- Label: Anthem (Canada), Atlantic
- Songwriter: Lee/Lifeson/Peart
- Producers: Nick Raskulinecz and Rush

Rush singles chronology
"The Larger Bowl (A Pantoum)" (2007)	"Caravan" (2010)	"Headlong Flight" (2012)

"Caravan" is the first single from Canadian rock band Rush's 19th studio album, Clockwork Angels. It was released to radio stations and saw digital release on June 1, 2010 (a full two years before the album's proper release), on CD via mail order later that month, and as a 7" vinyl record for Record Store Day 2011, with a limited printing of 3,000 units. The B-side is an additional studio track titled "BU2B", which stands for the lyric "brought up to believe". Both songs were recorded April 13, 2010, at Blackbird Studios in Nashville with producer Nick Raskulinecz with mixing and engineering done by Richard Chycki at the Sound Kitchen in Franklin, Tennessee. The songs were mastered by Ted Jensen at Sterling Sound in New York City.

== Track listing ==
Music by Lee/Lifeson and lyrics by Peart

No.	Title	Length
1.	"Caravan"	5:40
2.	"BU2B"	4:21

== Personnel ==
- Geddy Lee – bass guitar, keyboards, bass pedals, vocals
- Alex Lifeson – guitars, keyboards
- Neil Peart – drums, lyrics
- David Campbell – string arrangement and conducting

== Chart performance ==
Chart	Position
Finnish Singles Chart	19
US Mainstream Rock	38
US Bubbling Under Hot 100 b/w "BU2B"	19
Canadian Hot 100	44
UK Singles	184

== In other media ==
The song was released as a downloadable track for Rock Band 3 in 2011. It was also featured in TSN's introductory footage to the CFL game between the Calgary Stampeders and Montreal Alouettes on July 20, 2013.

== See also ==
- List of Rush songs
