= Headlong Flight =

Single by Rush

from the album Clockwork Angels
- Released: April 19, 2012
- Length: 7:20; 5:08 (radio edit)
- Label: Anthem (Canada), Roadrunner
- Songwriter(s): Lee/Lifeson, lyrics by Peart
- Producer(s): Nick Raskulinecz and Rush

Rush singles chronology
"Caravan" (2010)	"Headlong Flight" (2012)	"The Wreckers" (2012)

"Headlong Flight" is the second single from Canadian rock band Rush's 19th studio album, Clockwork Angels. It was released to radio stations and for online preview on April 19, 2012, and became available digitally and on disk April 24, 2012. A lyrics video was also made available on YouTube. In an interview with Rolling Stone, Geddy Lee commented on the song:

'Headlong Flight' was one of those songs that was a joy to write and record from beginning to end. Alex [Lifeson] and I had blast jamming in my home studio one day before the second leg of the Time Machine tour, and I did not revisit that jam until a year later. Alex and I assembled the song to be an instrumental and its original title was 'Take That Lampshade Off Yo Head!,' but once we saw the lyrics Neil [Peart] had written, I knew that the spirit of the lyrics matched the instrumental perfectly and it was just a matter of making them fit and writing the melodies.

Musically, the song contains elements inspired by "Bastille Day," another Rush song. In a 2012 interview, Neil Peart confirmed this was deliberate.

== Track listing ==
Music by Lee/Lifeson, lyrics by Peart

No.	Title	Length
1.	"Headlong Flight" (Radio Edit)	5:08
2.	"Headlong Flight" (Album Version)	7:20

== Chart performance ==
Chart	Peak position
U.S. Billboard Mainstream Rock	23
Billboard Canadian Hot 100	84

== Personnel ==
- Geddy Lee – lead vocals, bass, bass pedals, keyboards
- Alex Lifeson – guitar
- Neil Peart – drums, percussion
- David Campbell – String arrangement and conducting

== See also ==
- List of Rush songs
