= Geddy Lee =

Canadian musician (born 1953)

Geddy Lee OC
- Lee at the 2026 Toronto International Film Festival

Background information
- Born: Gary Lee Weinrib; July 29, 1953 (age 73); Willowdale, Toronto, Ontario, Canada
- Genres: Progressive rock; hard rock; heavy metal
- Occupations: Musician; singer; songwriter; author; record producer
- Instruments: Vocals; bass guitar; keyboards; guitar
- Years active: 1968–present
- Labels: Anthem; Atlantic; Elektra
- Member of: Rush
- Formerly of: Big Dirty Band
- Spouse: Nancy Young (m. 1976)
- Lee's speaking voice On Rotosound guitar strings

Signature
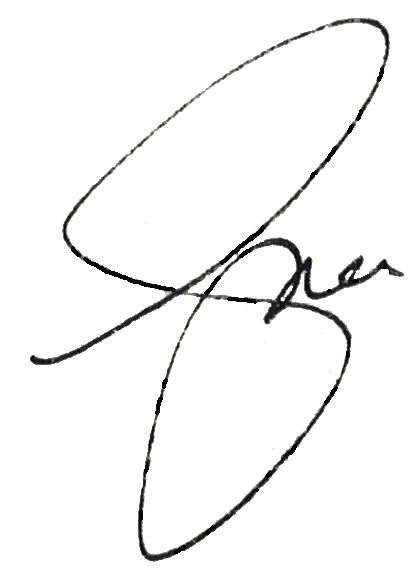

Geddy Lee Weinrib (/ˈɡɛdi/; born Gary Lee Weinrib, July 29, 1953) is a Canadian musician, best known as the lead vocalist, bassist, and keyboardist for the rock band Rush. Lee joined the band in September 1968 at the request of his childhood friend Alex Lifeson, replacing original bassist and frontman Jeff Jones. Along with Lifeson, Lee is one of the only two members to appear on every Rush album, and he remained in the band until their initial dissolution from 2015 to 2025. Lee's solo effort, My Favourite Headache, was released in 2000.

Lee's style, technique, and skill on the bass have inspired many rock musicians such as Cliff Burton of Metallica; Steve Harris of Iron Maiden; John Myung of Dream Theater; Les Claypool of Primus; Steve Di Giorgio of Sadus, Death and Testament; and Tim Commerford of Rage Against the Machine and Audioslave. Along with his Rush bandmates – guitarist Alex Lifeson and drummer Neil Peart – Lee was made an Officer of the Order of Canada in 1996. The trio was the first rock band to receive this honour. In 2013, the group was inducted into the Rock and Roll Hall of Fame. In 2006, Lee was ranked 13th by Hit Parader on their list of the 100 Greatest Heavy Metal Vocalists of All Time. In 2020, Rolling Stone ranked Lee 24th on their list of the 50 greatest bassists of all time.

== Early life ==
He was born Gary Lee Weinrib on July 29, 1953, in Willowdale, Toronto, Ontario, to Morris Weinrib (born Moshe Meir Weinrib; 1920–1965) from Ostrowiec Świętokrzyski, Poland; and Mary "Manya" Rubinstein (born Malka Rubinstein; 1925–2021), who was born in Warsaw and raised in Wierzbnik. His parents were Jewish Holocaust survivors from Poland who had survived the ghetto in Starachowice (where they met), followed by their imprisonments at Auschwitz and later Dachau and Bergen-Belsen concentration camps during the Holocaust and World War II. They were in their teens when they were initially imprisoned at Auschwitz. "It was kind of surreal pre-teen shit", says Lee, describing how his father bribed guards to bring shoes to his mother. After a period, his mother was transferred to Bergen-Belsen and his father to Dachau. When the war ended four years later, and the Allies liberated the camps, Morris set out in search of Manya and found her at a Bergen-Belsen displaced persons camp. They married there and eventually emigrated to Canada.

When Lee started school, his name was incorrectly registered. As a result, Lee grew up thinking his middle name was "Lorne". As a teenager, he saw a copy of his birth certificate and discovered that his middle name was "Lee". Lee went to elementary school with actor and comedian Rick Moranis.

Lee's father died young, which forced Lee's mother to work to support their three children by running the Newmarket, Ontario, variety store that her husband had owned and managed. Lee has suggested that his father's death was probably a factor in his becoming a musician: "It was a terrible blow that I lost him, but the course of my life changed because my mother couldn't control us." He has said that losing his father at such an early age made him aware of how "quickly life can disappear", which inspired him from then on to get the most out of his life and music.

Lee turned his basement into practice space for a band he formed with high school friends. After the band began earning income from small performances at high school shows or other events, he decided to drop out of high school and play rock and roll professionally. His mother was devastated when he gave her the news.

All the shit I put her through, on top of the fact that she just lost her husband. I felt like I had to make sure that it was worth it. I wanted to show her that I was a professional, that I was working hard, and wasn't just a fuckin' lunatic.

Jweekly featured Lee's reflections on his mother's experiences as a refugee and on his own Jewish heritage. Lee's name, Geddy, was derived from his mother's Polish-accented pronunciation of his given first name, Gary. This was picked up by his friends in school, leading Lee to adopt it as his stage name (excising his surname, leaving his middle name as his surname) and later his legal name, Geddy Lee Weinrib (replacing his first name).

After Rush had become a widely recognized rock group, Lee told the group's drummer and lyricist, Neil Peart, about his mother's early life. Peart then wrote the lyrics to "Red Sector A", which was inspired by her ordeal. The song, for which Lee wrote the music, was released on the band's 1984 album Grace Under Pressure. The lyrics include the following verse:

I hear the sound of gunfire at the prison gate
Are the liberators here?
Do I hope or do I fear?
For my father and my brother, it's too late
But I must help my mother stand up straight.

== Music career ==
=== Early years ===
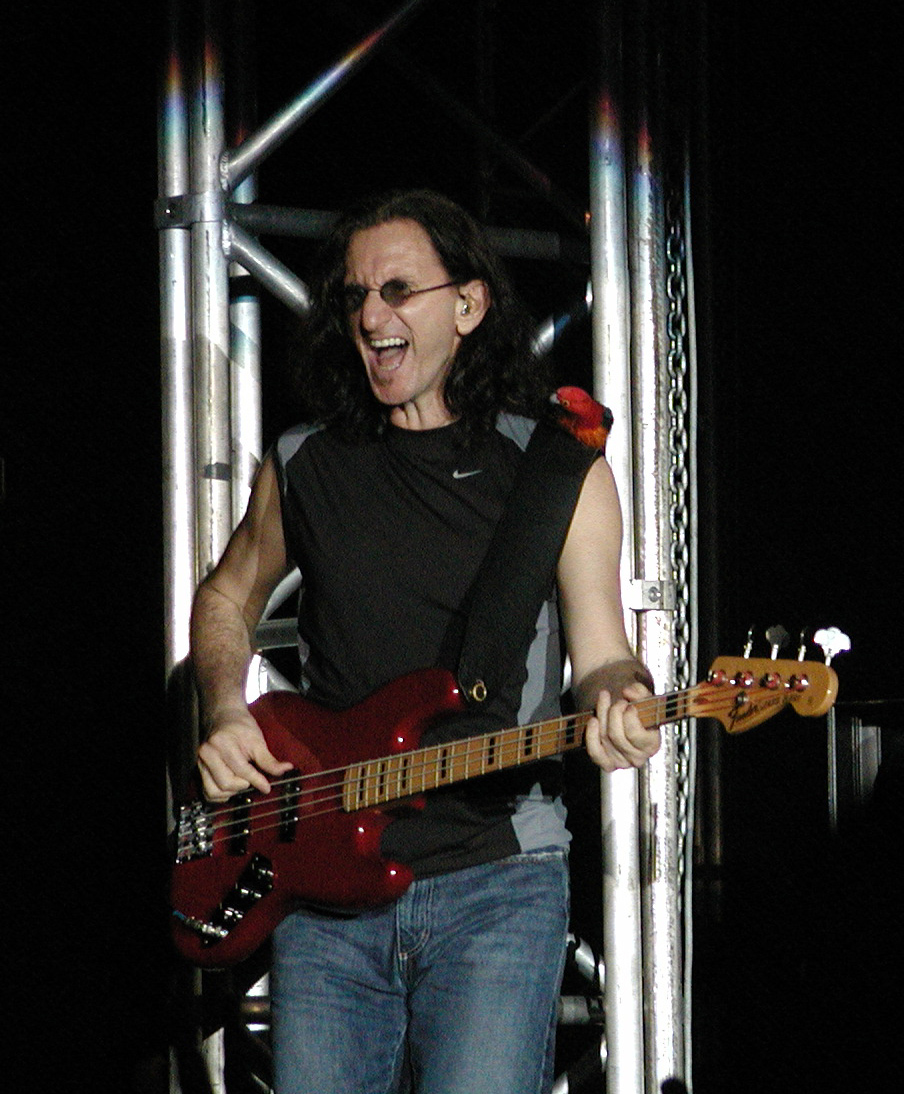
Lee performing in 2004

Lee began playing music in school when he was 10 or 11 and received his first acoustic guitar at 14. In school, he first played drums, trumpet and clarinet. However, learning to play instruments in school was not satisfying to Lee, and he took basic piano lessons independently. His interest increased dramatically after listening to some of the popular rock groups at the time. Early influences included Jack Bruce of Cream, John Entwistle of the Who, Jeff Beck, and Procol Harum. "I was mainly interested in early British progressive rock", said Lee. "That's how I learned to play bass, emulating Jack Bruce and people like that." Bruce's style of music was also noticed by Lee, who liked that "his sound was distinctive – it wasn't boring." Lee has also been influenced by Paul McCartney, Chris Squire, and James Jamerson.

Lee joined Rush in September 1968 at the request of his childhood friend Alex Lifeson, replacing original bassist and frontman Jeff Jones. In 1969, Rush began playing professionally in coffeehouses, high school dances and at various outdoor recreational events. By 1971, they were now playing primarily original songs in small clubs and bars, including Toronto's Gasworks and Abbey Road Pub. Lee describes the group during these early years as being "weekend warriors". They were holding down jobs during the weekdays and playing music on weekends: "We longed to break out of the boring surrounding of the suburbs and the endless similarities . . . the shopping plazas and all that stuff...the music was a vehicle for us to speak out." He claims that in the beginning, they were simply "a straightforward rock band."

Short of money, they began opening concerts at venues such as Toronto's Victory Burlesque Theatre for the glam rock band New York Dolls. By 1972, Rush began performing full-length concerts, mainly consisting of original songs, in cities including Toronto and Detroit. As they gained more recognition, they began performing as an opening act for groups such as Aerosmith, Kiss, and Blue Öyster Cult.

=== Rising popularity ===
Lee in 1977.

After several early albums and increasing popularity, Rush's status as a rock group soared over the following five years as they consistently toured worldwide and produced successful albums, including 2112 (1976), A Farewell to Kings (1977), Hemispheres (1978), Permanent Waves (1980), and Moving Pictures (1981). Lee began adding synthesizers in 1977, with the release of A Farewell to Kings. Keyboard critic Greg Armbruster says the additional sounds from synthesizers expanded the group's "textural capabilities" and allowed the trio to produce an orchestrated and more complex progressive rock music style. It also gave Lee the ability to play bass simultaneously, as he could control the synthesizer with foot pedals. In 1981, he won Keyboard magazine's poll as "Best New Talent." By the 1984 album Grace Under Pressure, Lee was surrounding himself with stacks of keyboards on stage.

By the 1980s, Rush had become one of the "biggest rock bands on the planet", selling out arena seats when touring. Lee was known for his dynamic stage movements. According to music critic Tom Mulhern, writing in 1980, "it's dazzling to see so much sheer energy expended without a nervous breakdown." By 1996, their Test for Echo Tour began performing without an opening act, their shows lasting nearly three hours; this tradition continued until Rush's retirement following their 2015 tour (coinciding with Neil Peart's retirement from touring). Lee and Lifeson reunited as Rush in October 2025, with Anika Nilles filling in for Peart, after his passing in January 2020.

=== My Favourite Headache ===
My Favourite Headache, Lee's solo album, was released on November 14, 2000, while Rush was on a hiatus following the deaths of Neil Peart's daughter and wife. Musicians associated with the project include friend and Rush collaborator Ben Mink and drummer Matt Cameron of Soundgarden and Pearl Jam.

In April 2025, Geddy Lee released a 12" single titled The Lost Demos, consisting of re-recordings of two previously unpublished demos from My Favourite Headache. On the week of its release, the United Kingdom The Lost Demos reached 30th on the Official Physical Singles Chart and Official Vinyl Singles Chart, and the A-side, "Gone", reached 62nd on the UK singles chart.

=== Side projects ===
The bulk of Lee's work in music has been with Rush (see Rush discography). However, Lee has also contributed to a body of work outside of his involvement with the band through guest appearances and album production. In 1980, Lee was brought in to produce Toronto-based band Wireless who had previously opened up for Rush and were on the verge of breaking up. With Lee at the helm, the group recorded their third and final album, No Static, released on Rush's label, Anthem Records.

In 1981, Lee was the featured guest for the hit song "Take Off" and its included comedic commentary with Bob and Doug McKenzie (played by Rick Moranis and Dave Thomas, respectively) for the McKenzie Brothers' comedy album Great White North, which was released on Rush's Anthem label. While Rush has had great success selling albums, "Take Off" is the highest-charting single on the Billboard Hot 100 of Lee's career.

In 1982, Lee produced the first (and only) album from Toronto's new wave band Boys Brigade. On the 1985 album We Are the World, by humanitarian consortium USA for Africa, Lee recorded guest vocals for the song "Tears Are Not Enough". Lee sang "O Canada", the Canadian national anthem, at Baltimore's Camden Yards for the 1993 Major League Baseball All-Star Game.

Another version of "O Canada", with a rock arrangement, was recorded by Lee and Lifeson for the 1999 film soundtrack South Park: Bigger, Longer, and Uncut.

Lee also plays bass on Canadian rock band I Mother Earth's track "Good for Sule", which is featured on the group's 1999 album Blue Green Orange.

Along with his bandmates, Lee was a guest musician on the Max Webster song "Battle Scar", from the 1980 album Universal Juveniles.

Lee appeared in Broken Social Scene's music video for their 2006 single "Fire Eye'd Boy", judging the band while performing various musical tasks. In 2006, Lee joined Lifeson's supergroup, the Big Dirty Band, to provide songs accompanying Trailer Park Boys: The Movie.

In 2017, Lee performed in place of late bassist Chris Squire with Yes during the band's Rock and Roll Hall of Fame induction, playing bass for the song "Roundabout."

In 2018, Lee published Geddy Lee's Big Beautiful Book of Bass, which highlights his collection of over 200 basses along with interviews with some of the leading bass players and bass technicians.

In 2020, Lee provided guest vocals to an all-star Canadian rendition of the late Bill Withers song "Lean on Me" during the TV special Stronger Together, Tous Ensemble, a Canadian benefit performance simulcast by every major television network in Canada as a benefit for Food Banks Canada during the COVID-19 pandemic. In 2020, Rolling Stone ranked him as the 24th-greatest bassist of all time.

In September 2021, Barenaked Ladies frontman Ed Robertson revealed that he was working on a "secret project" with Lee, which turned out to be callouts for a subsequent Rush pinball machine.

In 2022, he appeared as a guest star playing Thomas Sawyer on the acclaimed long-running CBC period drama Murdoch Mysteries.

In November 2023, Lee published an autobiography titled My Effin' Life. The book was promoted with a 19-date tour of the UK and North America.

On December 5, 2023, Paramount+ released a video series, "Geddy Lee Asks: Are Bass Players Human Too?" Four episodes were aired on Les Claypool, Robert Trujillo, Melissa Auf der Maur, and Krist Novoselic. Each episode features Lee visiting with and talking to the guest bassist.

== Artistry ==
=== Style ===
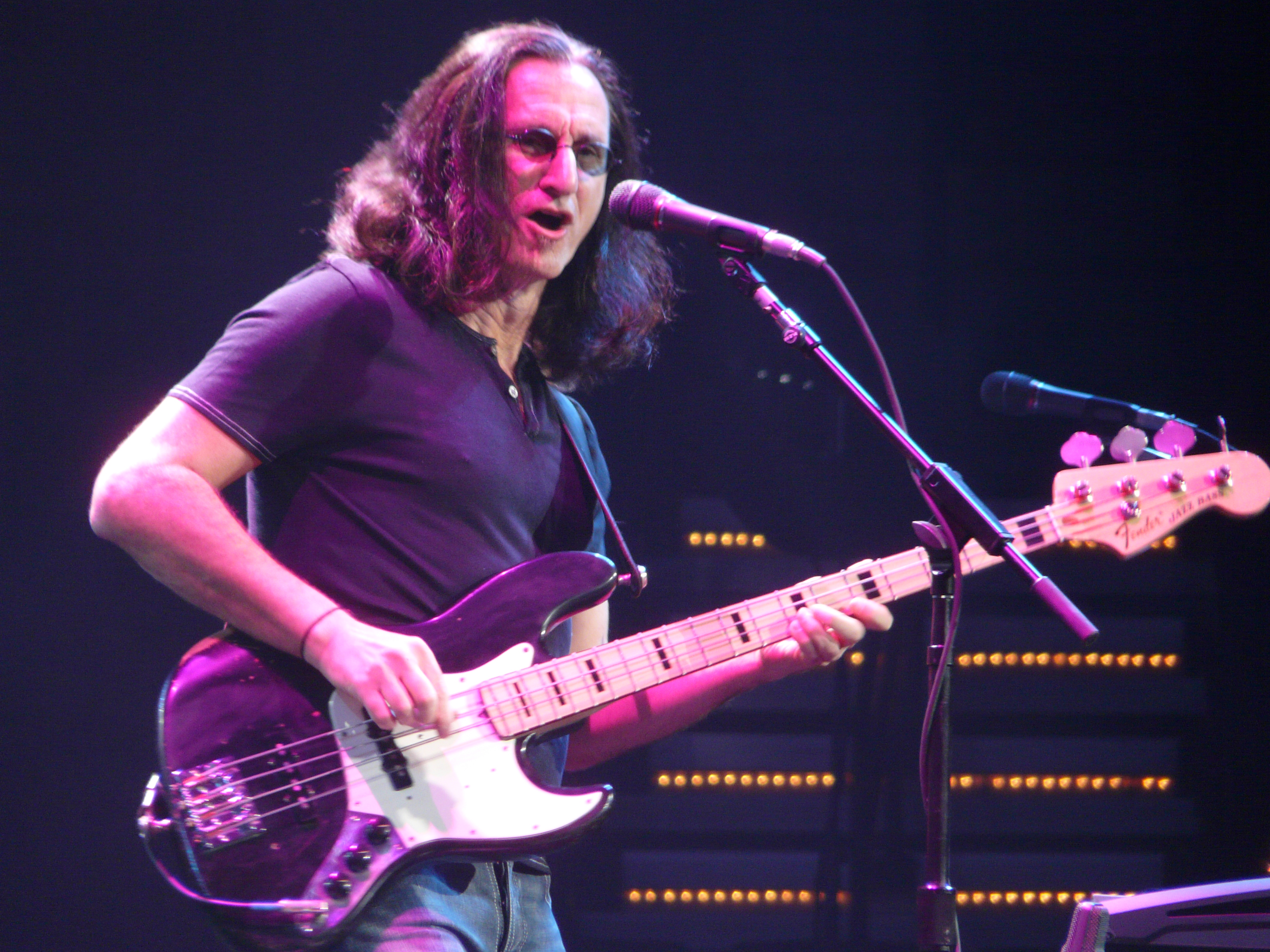
Lee live in concert at the Xcel Energy Center on May 22, 2008

Like Cream, Rush followed the model of a "power trio", with Lee playing bass and singing. Lee's vocals produced a distinctive, resonant "countertenor". Lee possessed a three-octave vocal range spanning from baritone through tenor, alto, and mezzo-soprano pitch ranges; however, his voice has lowered with age. Lee's playing style is widely regarded for his use of high treble, very hard playing of the strings and for utilizing the bass as a lead instrument, often contrapuntal to Lifeson's guitar.

=== Legacy and influence ===
Music industry writer Christopher Buttner, who interviewed Lee in 1996, described him as a prodigy and "role model" for what every musician wants to be, noting his proficiency on stage. Buttner cited Lee's ability to vary time signatures, play multiple keyboards, use bass pedal controllers and control sequencers, all while singing lead vocals into as many as three microphones. Buttner adds that few musicians of any instrument "can juggle half of what Geddy can do without literally falling on their ass." As a result, notes Tom Mulhern, Lee's instrumentation was the "pulse" of the group and created a "one-man rhythm section", which complemented guitarist Alex Lifeson and percussionist Neil Peart. Bass instructor Allan Slutsky, or "Dr Licks", credits Lee's "biting, high-end bass lines and creative synthesizer work" for helping the group become "one of the most innovative" of all the groups that play arena rock. By 1989, Guitar Player magazine had designated Lee the "Best Rock Bass" player from their reader's poll for the previous five years.

Greg Prato of AllMusic wrote that "few hard rock bassists have been as influential as Rush's Geddy Lee." Bass players who have cited Lee as an influence include Cliff Burton of Metallica; Steve Harris of Iron Maiden; John Myung of Dream Theater; Les Claypool of Primus; Steve Di Giorgio of Sadus, Death and Testament; and Tim Commerford of Rage Against the Machine and Audioslave.

== Collections ==
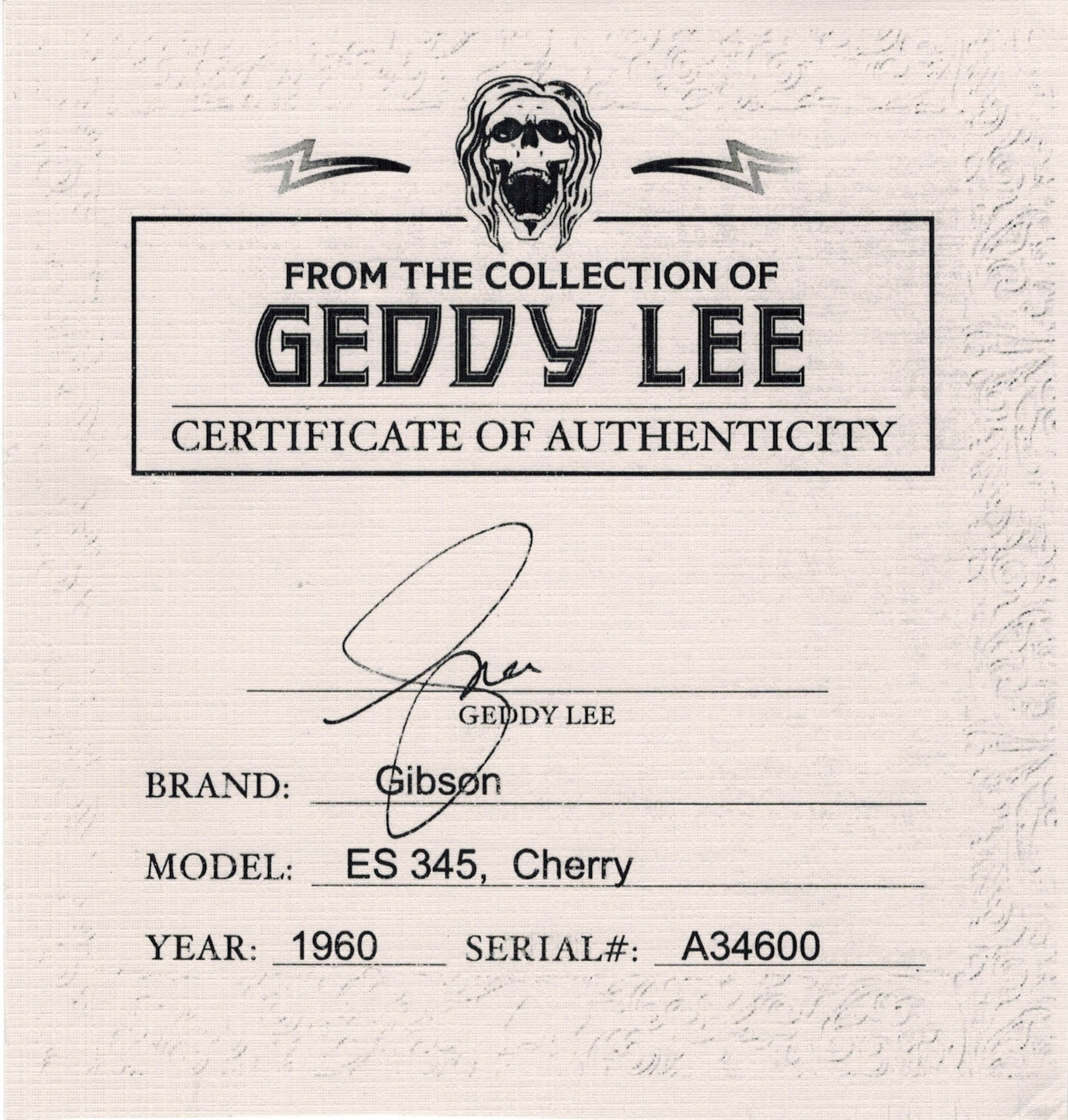
Geddy Lee certificate of authenticity for a guitar

Lee is a collector, and has collected baseball ephemera, vintage bass guitars, and wines, with a collection of 5,000 bottles. As a child he collected stamps and vinyl records. He went on to collect first edition books as well as bass guitars. Lee is also an avid watch collector.

=== Baseball ===
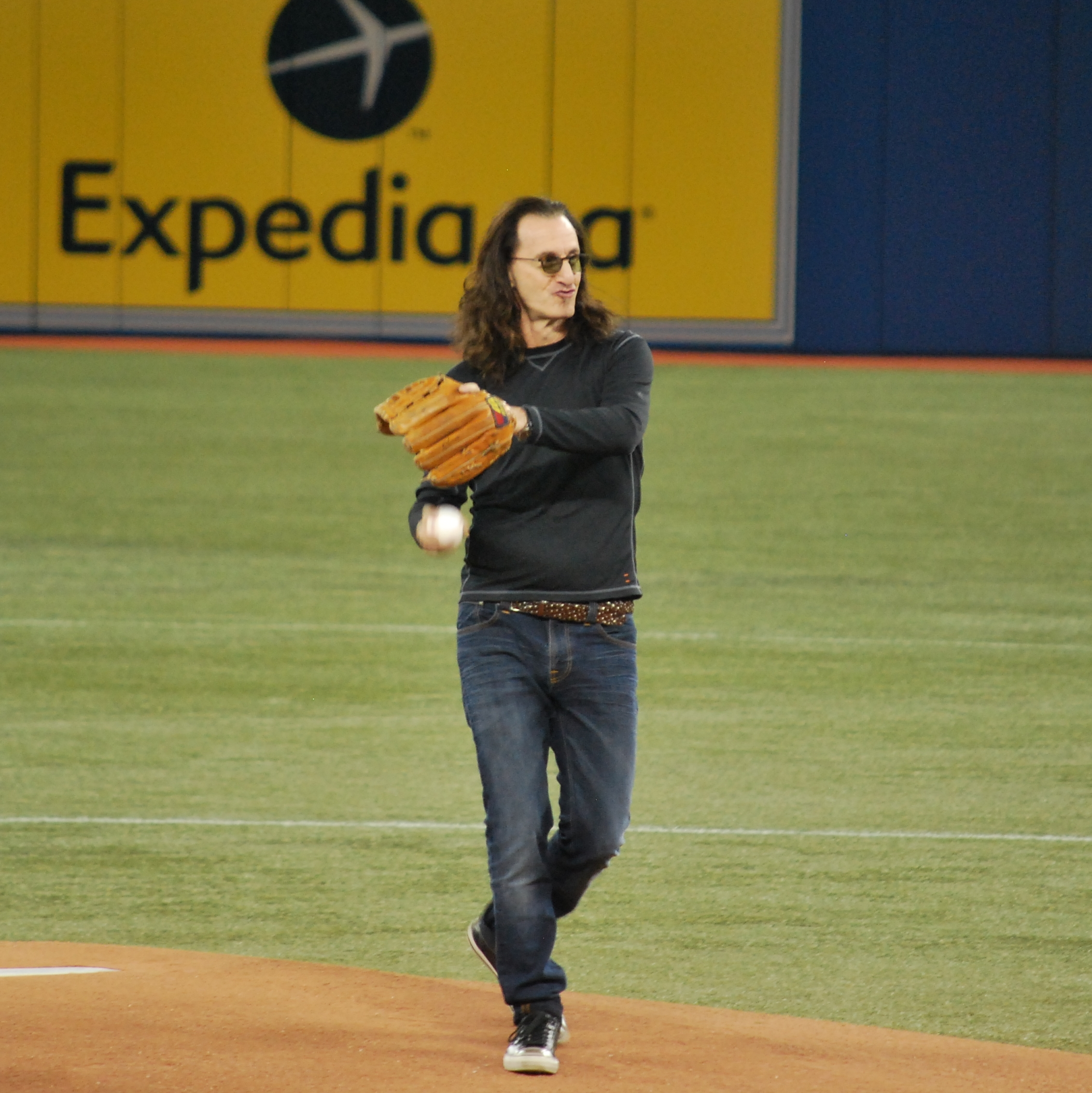
Lee is an avid baseball fan with an immense collection of memorabilia, including authentic signatures from Christy Mathewson, Murderers' Row, Mickey Mantle, and presidents of the United States. Pictured is Lee throwing a ceremonial first pitch for the Toronto Blue Jays in 2013

Lee is also a longtime baseball fan. His favourite team while growing up was the Detroit Tigers, and he later became a fan of the Toronto Blue Jays after they were established. In the 1980s, Lee began reading the works of Bill James, particularly The Bill James Baseball Abstracts, which led to an interest in sabermetrics and participation in a fantasy baseball keeper league. He collects baseball memorabilia, once donating part of his collection to the Negro Leagues Baseball Museum, and threw the ceremonial first pitch to inaugurate the 2013 Toronto Blue Jays season. Lee sang the Canadian national anthem before the 1993 MLB All-Star Game. In 2016, Lee planned to produce an independent film about baseball in Italy. Lee is regularly seen in his seat behind home plate at the Toronto Blue Jays stadium Rogers Centre with his scorecard. When the team was forced to move to Buffalo during the 2020 season, a cardboard cutout of Lee was placed in a seat behind home plate.

=== Guitars and basses ===
Lee also collects guitars and basses. He has a collection of over 250 vintage basses. He owns a 1961 Fender Precision Bass previously owned by John Entwistle of the Who. He also owns two 1964 Fender Jazz Basses in the rare Dakota Red color.

In 2019, Lee sent several of his guitars to Mecum Auctions, including a 1959 Les Paul Standard, a 1960 Gibson ES-345, a 1955 Fender Stratocaster, a 1960 Gibson ES-335, a 1965 Gibson ES-335 and a 1967 Gibson Flying V.

== Equipment used ==
=== Basses ===
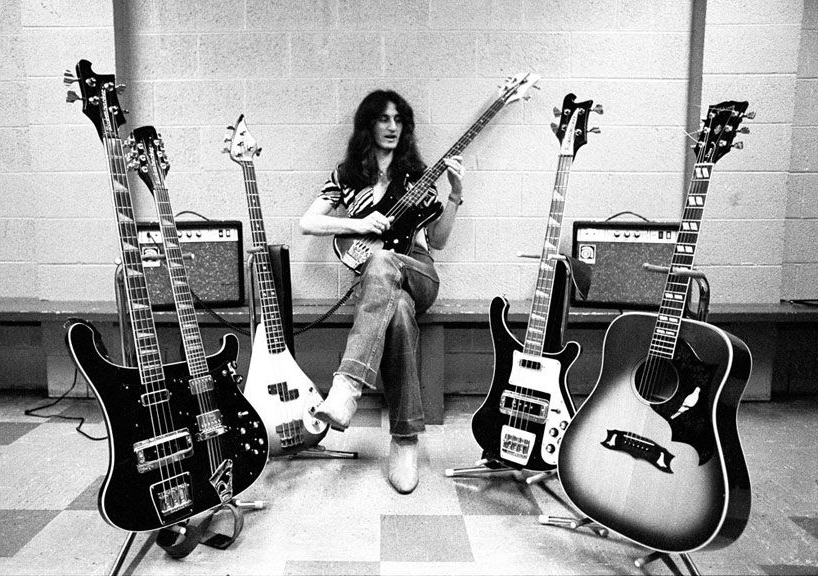
Lee on tour with various basses and an acoustic guitar

In the early days of Rush all the way up to their debut album, Lee used a Fender Precision Bass, and eventually had its body modified and refinished to a blue "teardrop"-shape. Inspired by the distinctive sound of Yes bassist Chris Squire, Lee then acquired a black Rickenbacker 4001 bass, which remained his main instrument from the 1970s up until the early 1980s. During the band's "synth era" in the mid-1980s, Lee used Steinberger and later Wal basses, the latter of which he described as having more of a "jazzy" tone. From 1993's Counterparts onward, Lee began using the Fender Jazz Bass almost exclusively, returning to his trademark high treble sound. Lee had first used the Jazz Bass (alongside his Rickenbacker) to record Moving Pictures on songs such as "Tom Sawyer."

In 1998, Fender released the Geddy Lee Jazz Bass, available in Black and 3-Color Sunburst (as of 2009). This signature model is a recreation of Lee's favourite bass, a 1972 Fender Jazz that he bought in a pawn shop in Kalamazoo, Michigan in 1978. In 2015, Fender released a revised USA model of his signature bass, with most of the changes reflecting those Lee had made to his own instrument over the years.

Lee has been a longtime user of RotoSound strings. He uses Swing Bass RS66LD (.45-.105) on a majority of his basses, but used Funkmaster FM66 (.30-.90) on his Wal basses from 1985 to 1992.

=== Bass amplification ===
For Rush's 2010 tour, Lee used two Orange AD200 bass heads together with two OBC410 4x10 bass cabinets.

=== Keyboards and synthesizers ===
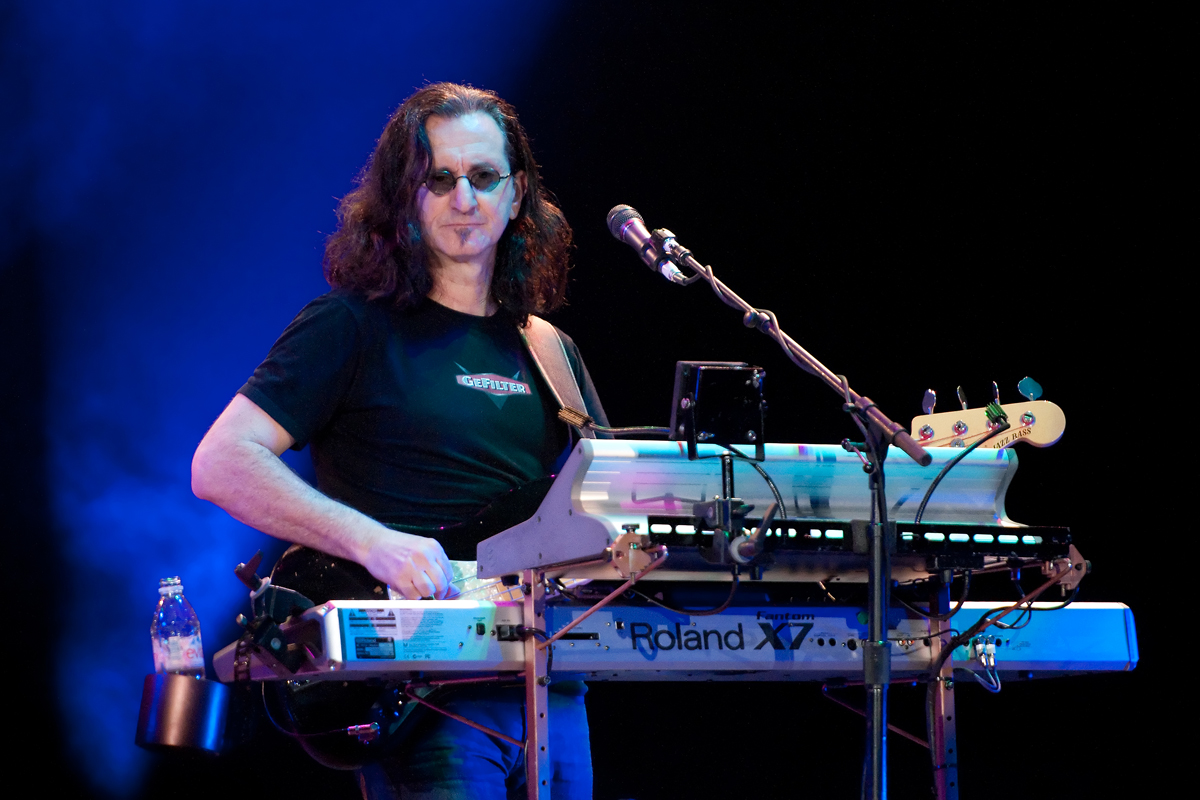
Lee with his Roland Fantom X7 during the 2010–2011 Time Machine Tour

Over the years, Lee has used synthesizers from Oberheim (Oberheim Eight Voice, OB-1, OB-X, OB-Xa), PPG (Wave 2.2 and 2.3), Roland (Jupiter 8, D-50, XV-5080, and Fantom X7), Moog (Minimoog, Taurus pedals, Little Phatty), and Yamaha (DX7, KX76).

=== Live performances: special equipment ===
==== Recreating unique sounds ====
Newer advances in synthesizer and sampler technology have allowed Lee to store familiar sounds from his old synthesizers alongside new ones in combination synthesizer/samplers, such as the Roland XV-5080. For live shows in 2002 and 2004, Lee and his keyboard technician used the playback capabilities of the XV-5080 to generate virtually all of Rush's keyboard sounds to date and additional complex sound passages that previously required several machines at once to produce.

To trigger these sounds in real-time, Lee uses MIDI controllers, placed at the locations on the stage where he has a microphone stand. Lee uses two types of MIDI controller: one type resembles a traditional synthesizer keyboard on a stand (Yamaha KX76). The second type is a large foot-pedal keyboard placed on the stage floor (Korg MPK-130, Roland PK-5). Combined, they enable Lee to use his free hands and feet to trigger sounds in electronic equipment that has been placed off-stage. With this technology Lee and his bandmates can present their arrangements in a live setting with the level of complexity and fidelity that fans have come to expect and without the need to resort to the use of backing tracks or employing an additional band member. During the Clockwork Angels Tour, a notable exception was when a string ensemble played string parts, originally arranged and conducted by David Campbell on Clockwork Angels.

==== Unique stage equipment ====
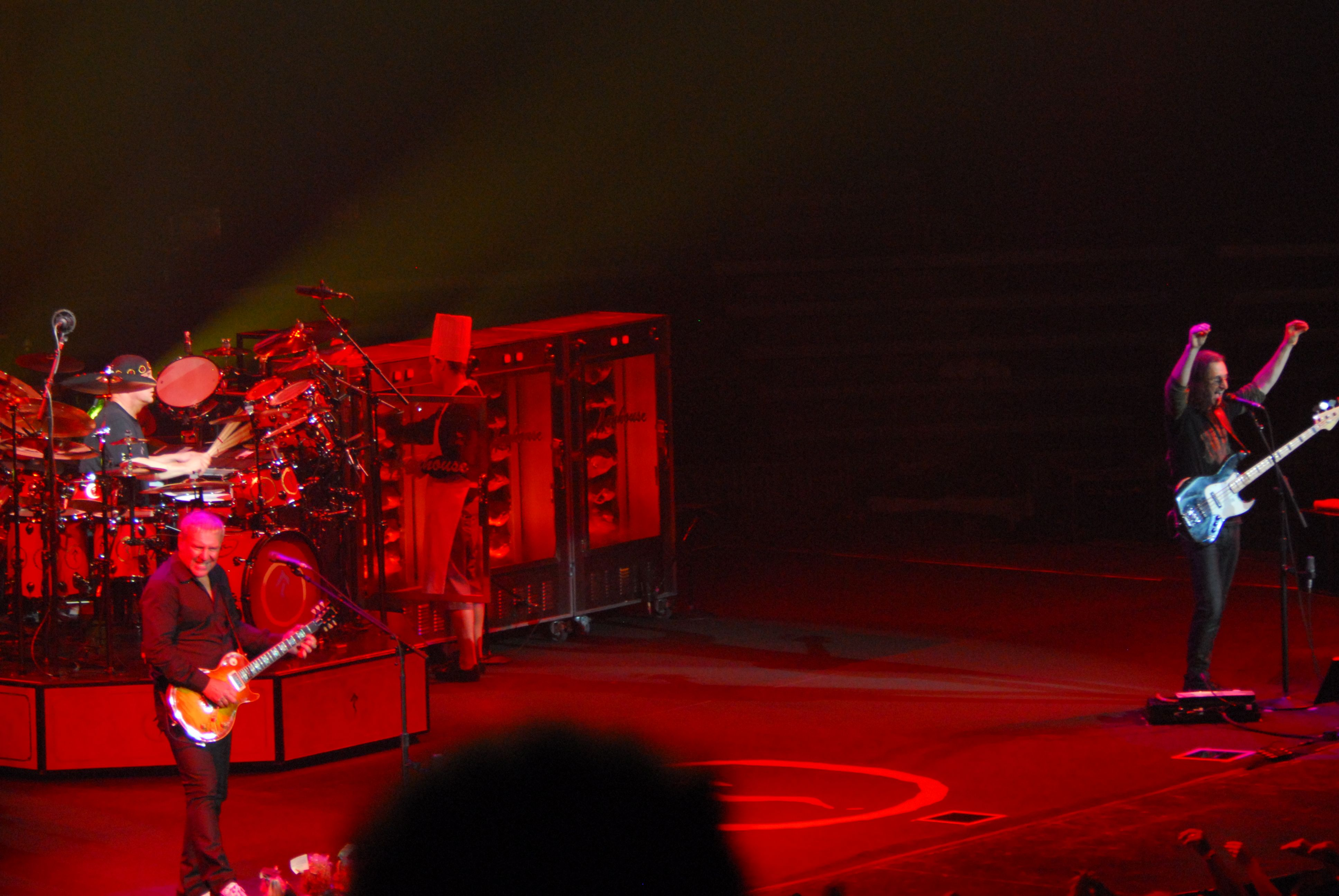
Rush live in concert with rotisseries and chef in background

In 1996, Lee stopped using traditional bass amplifiers on stage, opting to have the bass guitar signals input directly to the touring front-of-house console to improve control and sound definition. He began using Tech 21 SansAmp units after experimenting with one in the studio intended for Alex Lifeson's guitar and eventually received signature models from the company, most notably the GED-2112 rackmount.

Faced with the dilemma of what to do with the empty space left behind by the lack of large amplifier cabinets, Lee chose to decorate his side of the stage with unusual items. The Snakes & Arrows Tour prominently featured three Henhouse brand rotisserie chicken ovens on stage complete with an attendant in a chef's hat and apron to "tend" the chickens during shows.

== Awards ==
- 1990: The Royal Astronomical Society of Canada named Asteroid (12272) Geddylee
- 1994: With Rush, inducted into the Juno Hall of Fame
- 1996: Officer of the Order of Canada, along with bandmates Alex Lifeson and Neil Peart. The trio was the first rock band to receive this honour.
- 2007: Best Album for Bass (Snakes & Arrows) – Bass Player magazine
- 2010: With Rush, Star on the Hollywood Walk of Fame
- 2012: Queen Elizabeth II Diamond Jubilee Medal
- 2013: With Rush, Rock and Roll Hall of Fame inductee
- 2021: Lifetime Achievement Award for his philanthropic work at the Artists for Peace and Justice (APJ) annual gala

== Personal life ==
Lee married Nancy Young in 1976. They have a son and a daughter. He takes annual trips to France, where he indulges in cheese and wine. In 2011, a charitable foundation he supports, Grapes for Humanity, created the Geddy Lee Scholarship for winemaking students at Niagara College. Lee has described himself as a Jewish atheist, explaining to an interviewer, "I consider myself a Jew as a race, but not so much as a religion. I'm not down with religion at all. I'm a Jewish atheist, if that's possible."

=== Politics ===
Lee endorsed Brad Bradford for the 2026 Toronto mayoral election. Lee fears for the city's future under mayor Olivia Chow.

== Books ==
- Lee, Geddy (2018). Geddy Lee's Big Beautiful Book of Bass. HarperCollins. ISBN 978-0-06274783-9.
- ——— (2023). My Effin' Life. HarperCollins. ISBN 978-0-06315-942-6.
- ——— (2025). 72 Stories: From the Baseball Collection of Geddy Lee. Harper Collins. ISBN 978-0-06345019-6..
