= Earth, Sky, and Everything in Between =

Compilation album by I Mother Earth
- Released: March 27, 2001
- Recorded: 1993–1997
- Genre: Alternative rock
- Length: 65:00
- Labels: EMI, Capitol
- Producers: I Mother Earth, Jagori Tanna

I Mother Earth chronology
Blue Green Orange (1999)	Earth, Sky, and Everything in Between (2001)	The Quicksilver Meat Dream (2003)

Earth, Sky, and Everything in Between is a compilation by Canadian band I Mother Earth. It features four rare tracks and a live studio session recorded in 1997 for a Sound Source Radio Special at Mushroom Studios, Vancouver. “Wrong” is the most notable track as it was a song recorded for Scenery and Fish but was left off the album due to space issues.

== Personnel ==
- Edwin – vocals
- Jagori Tanna – guitars, backing vocals
- Bruce Gordon – bass
- Christian Tanna – drums

== Track listing ==
All songs written by "I Mother Earth"

1. Levitate (Acoustic) – 4:34
2. So Gently We Go (Acoustic) – 5:07
3. Subterranean Wonderland – 8:05
4. Wrong – 5:35
5. Like a Girl – 4:55
6. Used to be Alright – 5:30
7. Pisser – 5:30
8. Another Sunday – 4:42
9. One More Astronaut – 6:10
10. Por Todos (Percussion Intro) – 2:25
11. Earth, Sky & C – 7:04
12. Levitate – 5:36

Tracks 1 to 3 are b-sides to the Dig album, track 4 is a b-side to the Scenery and Fish album, tracks 5 to 12 are 1997 live studio sessions.
