= XXX (soundtrack) =

Soundtrack to XXX

Music From and Inspired by the Motion Picture xXx: A New Breed of Secret Agent

Soundtrack album by Various artists
- Released: August 6, 2002
- Recorded: 2002
- Genres: Alternative metal; hip hop; nu metal
- Length: 1:19:01
- Labels: Universal; UMG Soundtracks
- Producers: Kathy Nelson; Neal H. Moritz; Rob Cohen; Avery Lipman (exec.); Mannie Fresh; Bink!; David Bottrill; Eric Valentine; Fermin IV Caballero; Glen Ballard; Jacob Hellner; Jay E; Jason Roberts; Jay Baumgardner; Josh Homme; Rammstein; Matt Hyde; Moby; Mushroomhead; Orbital; Rashad Thomas; Rhemario Webber; Sleepy Brown; Timbaland; The Neptunes

Singles from Music From and Inspired by the Motion Picture xXx: A New Breed of Secret Agent
- 1. "Adrenaline" Released: February 18, 2002; 2. "Still Fly" Released: March 4, 2002; 3. "Connected for Life" Released: May 28, 2002; 4. "Are We Cuttin'" Released: July 23, 2002; 5. "Yo, Yo, Yo" Released: April 29, 2003

Music From and Inspired by the Motion Picture xXx: A New Breed of Secret Agent is the film soundtrack to the film xXx. It was released on August 6, 2002, via Universal Records and UMG Soundtracks as a two-disc set. The first disc is composed of a blend of alternative rock, nu metal and techno music. The second disc, entitled The Xander Xone, contains ten tracks of hip hop music. Production was handled by Kathy Nelson, Neal H. Moritz and Rob Cohen with executive producer Avery Lipman.

The album peaked at #8 in Austria, #9 in the United States, #12 in New Zealand, #24 in Australia and Germany. It was certified Gold by the Recording Industry Association of America on September 16, 2002, 2× Platinum by the Music Canada (200,000 copies) on April 11, 2003 and Gold by the Asociación Mexicana de Productores de Fonogramas y Videogramas on July 28, 2003.

== Track listing ==
=== Disc 1 ===
No.	Title	Writer(s)	Producer(s)	Length
1.	"Feuer frei!" (performed by Rammstein)	C. Lorenz; C. Schneider; O. Reidel; P. Landers; R. Kruspe; T. Lindemann	Jacob Hellner; Rammstein	3:10
2.	"Bodies (Vrenna XXX Mix)" (performed by Drowning Pool)	Drowning Pool	Jay Baumgardner; Chris Vrenna (add.)	3:22
3.	"I Will Be Heard" (performed by Hatebreed)	Hatebreed	Matt Hyde	2:58
4.	"You Think I Ain't Worth a Dollar, But I Feel Like a Millionaire" (performed by Queens of the Stone Age)	J. Homme; M. Lalli	Eric Valentine; Josh Homme	2:37
5.	"Before I Die" (performed by Mushroomhead)	J. Sekula; J. Kilcoyne; J. Popson; J. Hetrick; S. Felton; T. Schmitz	Steve Felton; Mushroomhead	3:14
6.	"Get Up Again" (performed by Flaw)	C. Ballinger; C. Volz; J. Davit; L. Arny; R. Juhrs	David Bottrill	2:56
7.	"Landing" (performed by Moby and Azure Ray)	R. Hall; M. Taylor; O. Fink	Moby	3:43
8.	"Adrenaline" (performed by Gavin Rossdale)	G. Rossdale; B. Ballard Jr.	Glen Ballard	4:15
9.	"004" (performed by Fermín IV)	F. Elizondo; J. Roberts	Fermin IV Caballero; Jason Roberts	3:56
10.	"Technologicque Park" (performed by Orbital)	P. Hartnoll; P. Hartnoll	Orbital	5:45

Bonus tracks
No.	Title	Writer(s)	Producer(s)	Length
11.	"Me vs. Me" (performed by 4Lyn)	R. Clauß; B. Düßler	Darren Grahn; Florian Sommer	3:40
12.	"Juicy" (performed by I Mother Earth)	C. Tanna; J. Tanna	David Bottrill; Jagori Tanna	4:09

Notes

- The Canadian release featured an additional track "Juicy" by I Mother Earth, which was added too late to be included on the American release. The Australia/Germany/New Zealand release featured the track "Me vs. Me" by 4Lyn as the 11th track and consequently omitted "Connected for Life" from the Xander Xone.

=== Disc 2 ===
The Xander Xone
No.	Title	Writer(s)	Producer	Length
1.	"Stick Out Ya Wrist" (performed by Nelly and Toya)	C. Haynes Jr.	Jason "Jay E" Epperson	3:50
2.	"Look at Me" (performed by Lil' Wayne)	D. Carter; B. Thomas	Jazze Pha	4:07
3.	"Truth or Dare" (performed by N*E*R*D, Kelis and Pusha T)	P. Williams; C. Hugo; T. Thornton	The Neptunes	4:23
4.	"Are We Cuttin'" (performed by Pastor Troy and Ms. Jade)	M. Troy; C. Young; T. Mosley	Timbaland	4:11
5.	"Still Fly" (performed by Big Tymers)	B. Williams; B. Thomas	Mannie Fresh	4:20
6.	"Connected for Life" (performed by Westside Connection and Butch Cassidy)	D. Rolison; W. Calhoun Jr.; O. Jackson Sr.	Mannie Fresh	4:32
7.	"Lights, Camera, Action! (Club Mix)" (performed by Mr. Cheeks, Missy Elliott and P. Diddy)	T. Kelly; R. Harrell III; A. Poree; L. Caston Jr.; F. Wilson	Bink!	3:41
8.	"It's Okay" (performed by Postaboy and Rashad)	R. Thomas; S. Dixon	Rashad Thomas	3:58
9.	"Yo, Yo, Yo" (performed by Dani Stevenson)	D. Stevenson; R. Webber	Rhemario Webber	3:34
10.	"Lick" (performed by Joi)	J. Gilliam-Gipp; P. Brown; B. Bennett; R. Murray; R. Wade	Sleepy Brown	6:29

== Charts ==
=== Weekly charts ===
Weekly chart performance for xXx
Chart (2002)	Peak position
Australian Albums (ARIA)	24
Austrian Albums (Ö3 Austria)	8
Canadian Albums (Billboard)	5
French Albums (SNEP)	65
German Albums (Offizielle Top 100)	24
New Zealand Albums (RMNZ)	12
Swiss Albums (Schweizer Hitparade)	42
US Billboard 200	9
US Top R&B/Hip-Hop Albums (Billboard)	16
US Soundtrack Albums (Billboard)	1

=== Year-end charts ===
Year-end chart performance for xXx
Chart (2002)	Position
Canadian Albums (Nielsen SoundScan)	76
Canadian Alternative Albums (Nielsen SoundScan)	21
Canadian Metal Albums (Nielsen SoundScan)	10
Canadian R&B Albums (Nielsen SoundScan)	14
Canadian Rap Albums (Nielsen SoundScan)	5
US Billboard 200	180
US Soundtrack Albums (Billboard)	12

== Certifications ==
Region	Certification	Certified units/sales
Canada (Music Canada)	2× Platinum	200,000^{^}
Mexico (AMPROFON)	Gold	75,000^{^}
United States (RIAA)	Gold	500,000^{^}
^{^} Shipments figures based on certification alone.

== Other information ==
- Gavin Rossdale's "Adrenaline" peaked at #20 on the Billboard Modern Rock Tracks chart and #24 on its Mainstream Rock Tracks chart.
- It was used as the official theme song for WWE 2002 Unforgiven pay-per-view event.
