= So Gently We Go =

Single by I Mother Earth

from the album Dig
- Released: 1994
- Recorded: 1993
- Genre: Alternative rock
- Length: 7:04 (Album version); 3:59 (Radio edit)
- Label: EMI, Capitol
- Songwriter(s): Jagori and Christian Tanna
- Producer(s): Mike Clink

I Mother Earth singles chronology
"Levitate" (1993)	"So Gently We Go" (1994)	"One More Astronaut" (1996)

"So Gently We Go" is a song by Canadian rock band I Mother Earth, released as a single from their debut studio album, Dig. The song reached #1 on Canada's CANCON chart.

== Track listing ==
US Version

1. So Gently We Go (Edit) - 3:59
2. Not Quite Sonic (LP Version) - 5:55
3. Levitate (Acoustic Version) - 4:36
4. So Gently We Go (Acoustic Version) - 5:10
5. Subterranean Wonderland - 8:06

== Charts ==
Year	Peak Chart Position	
Year	CAN	CAN Content (Cancon)
1994	43	1
