= One More Astronaut =

Single by I Mother Earth

from the album Scenery and Fish
- Released: 1996
- Genre: Alternative rock
- Length: 5:24; 4:37 (Edit)
- Label: EMI, Capitol
- Songwriters: Jagori and Christian Tanna
- Producers: Paul Northfield, Jagori Tanna

I Mother Earth singles chronology
| "Levitate" (1995) | "One More Astronaut" (1996) | "Another Sunday" (1996) |

"One More Astronaut" is a song by Canadian rock band I Mother Earth. It was released as the lead single from the band's second studio album, Scenery and Fish. It is considered to be the band's signature song. It is also the band's highest charting U.S. hit, peaking at 19 on the Billboard Mainstream Rock Tracks.

== Reception ==
"One More Astronaut reached #1 on Canada's Alternative chart. It was also the band's most successful song in the United States. The song won the 1996 CASBY Award for "Favourite New Song". The song ranked #58 on MuchMore's Top 100 Big Tunes of The 90s.

== In popular culture ==
- The song is featured as the first track on the first edition of MuchMusic's Big Shiny Tunes compilation series.

== Charts ==
| Chart (1996) | Peak position |
|---|---|
| Canadian RPM Singles Chart | 32 |
| Canadian RPM Alternative 30 | 1 |
| U.S. Billboard Mainstream Rock Tracks | 19 |

=== Year-end charts ===
| Chart (1996) | Position |
|---|---|
| Canada Alternative (RPM) | 26 |
| US Active Rock (Radio & Records) | 65 |
