= Another Spin Around the Sun =

Studio album by Edwin
- Released: April 27, 1999 (Canada); July 4, 2000 (U.S.)
- Studios: Presence Sound & Missionary Sound, Toronto.
- Genres: Rock, alternative rock
- Length: 47:17
- Label: Sony Music Entertainment
- Producers: Matt DeMatteo, Ruben Huizenga

Edwin chronology
Another Spin Around the Sun (1999)	Edwin & the Pressure (2002)

Professional ratings
Review scores
Source	Rating
Allmusic	3/5 stars

Another Spin Around the Sun is the debut solo album by Canadian rock musician Edwin. It was released on April 27, 1999, in Canada, and July 4, 2000, in the United States. The album marked a musical change in his career from his previous work with I Mother Earth, being more pop-oriented. It spawned five singles "Trippin'", "Hang Ten", "Alive", "And You", and "Rush". The album went Platinum in Canada and was nominated for a Juno Award for "Best Rock Album" in 2000. The album was voted as the sixth best Canadian album of 1999 by Chart readers.

== Track listing ==
1. "Theories" (Edwin, David Martin) – 4:36
2. "Trippin'" (Edwin, Martin, Ben Dunk) – 3:22
3. "Hang Ten" (Edwin, Martin) – 3:32
4. "And You" (Edwin, Jack Blades, Jim Huff) – 3:59
5. "Screaming Kings" (Edwin, John Keller) – 4:22
6. "Shotgun" (Edwin, Ruben Huizenga) – 2:38
7. "Alive" (Edwin, Martin, Stephan Moccio) – 6:10
8. "Rush" (Edwin, Matt DeMatteo, Martin) – 4:19
9. "Amazing" (Edwin, Huizenga) – 4:09
10. "Take Me Anywhere" (Edwin, Huizenga) – 4:29
11. "Better Than This" (Edwin) – 5:06
12. "Another Drink" (hidden track) (Edwin, DeMatteo) – 2:35

== Chart positions ==
=== Album ===
Chart	Position
Canadian Albums	12

=== Year-end ===
Chart (2000)	Position
Canadian Albums (Nielsen SoundScan)	128

=== Singles ===
Year	Title	Chart positions
Year	Title	CAN Rock
1999	"Trippin'"	4
1999	"Hang Ten"	3
1999	"And You"	11
2000	"Alive"	9
2000	"Rush"	-

== Personnel ==
- Edwin - Vocals, Backing Vocals
- Ruben Huizenga - Bass, Keyboards, Backing Vocals, Piano, Guitar, Producer, Engineer
- Matt DeMatteo - Guitar, Piano, Drums, Keyboards, Programming, Backing Vocals, Producer, Engineer
- Christian Szczesniak - Guitar, Keyboards
- Stephan Szczesniak - Drums
- Kenneth Cunningham - Bass, Keyboards, Piano

Additional:

- Blake Manning - Percussion, Drums
- Andrew Charters - Bass
- Chris Simpson - Drums
- Tanya Nagowski - Production Coordination
- George Marino - Mastering
- Anne Greenwood - Choir, Chorus
- Annalee Patipatanakoon - Strings
- Roberto Occhipinti - Strings
- Joe L. Britt - Choir, Chorus
- Daniel Mansilla - Percussion
- Mike Roth - A&R
- Melanie Campbell - Choir, Chorus
- Catherine McRae - Art Direction, Design
- Danny Couto - Photography, Animation
- Heather Barnes - Choir, Chorus
- Elizabeth Blastorah - Choir, Chorus
- Sharon Alexander - Choir, Chorus
- Lenny DeRose - Engineer, String Engineer
- Stephan Moccio - String Arrangements
- David Hetherington - Strings
- Fujice Imajishi - Strings
- Mel Mandel - Strings
- Jonathan Craig - Strings
- Roman Borys - Strings
- Marie Berard - Strings
- Douglas Perry - Strings
- Marc-Andre Savoie - Strings
- Mark Skazinetsky - Strings
