= Albert Nobbs (soundtrack) =

Albert Nobbs (Original Motion Picture Soundtrack)

Film score by Brian Byrne
- Released: 13 December 2011
- Recorded: 2011
- Studios: RTÉ Studios; The Cauldron Recording Studios
- Genre: Film score
- Length: 43:42
- Label: Varèse Sarabande
- Producer: Brian Byrne

Brian Byrne chronology
The Good Doctor (2011)	Albert Nobbs (2011)	Hannah Cohen's Holy Communion (2012)

Albert Nobbs (Original Motion Picture Soundtrack) is the score album to the 2011 film Albert Nobbs directed by Rodrigo García, starring Glenn Close, Mia Wasikowska and Aaron Johnson. The album, which released by Varèse Sarabande on 13 December 2011, featured score composed by Irish composer, arranger and conductor Brian Byrne, and an original song "Lay Your Head Down" written by Close and performed by Sinéad O'Connor. The song was nominated for Best Original Song at the 69th Golden Globe Awards, and won the 16th Satellite Awards in the same category. It was chosen as one of the 39 songs to be eligible for nominations at the Best Original Song at the 84th Academy Awards, but failed to enter the final list of nominations. Byrne won the Best Original Score category at the 9th Irish Film & Television Awards.

== Development ==
Brian Byrne was hired to compose the musical score. Before writing the cues, he penned a waltz for dance scene at the hotel where Nobbs work. Close loved the music which Byrne had used it at several pieces in the score. After completing 80% of the film's music, he needed a tune for the end credits, which resulted him writing a song with makeshift lyrics cobbled from the lines in the screenplay and played it to Close and Garcia who felt that the lyrics were "terrible". Close, being a former ASCAP member, agreed to help him modifying and rewriting the lyrics. Sinéad O'Connor recorded the song, for which Byrne had to record her vocals in Bulgaria, following O'Connor's European tour.

The song had to be derived from the themes of the musical score, which Byrne said "There's nothing throwaway in any of the music or the lyrics. You might listen to it and think, why is that fiddle there, or why is that piano there? The fiddle is there because it's the violin that was playing the first time we heard that piece of music in the film. The piano is there because I wanted to link the sound of the score, which has a lot of piano, with the song, so it doesn't sound like a tacked on song. It's an organic piece of music that comes out of the score and out of the emotions in the film."

== Track listing ==
No.	Title	Length
1.	"Lay Your Head Down" (lyrics written by Glenn Close; performed by Sinéad O'Connor)	4:12
2.	"Albert Nobbs Opening Titles"	5:15
3.	"Albert Counting Money"	1:50
4.	"Joe Mackins Theme"	0:34
5.	"Hubert In Albert's Bed"	1:09
6.	"Joe Fixes The Boiler"	1:09
7.	"Hubert Reveal"	0:48
8.	"Beginning Of The Ball"	1:26
9.	"Lay Your Head Down" (Instrumental)	2:25
10.	"The Party Quadrille"	2:03
11.	"Dr. Holloran Talks With Albert"	2:17
12.	"Albert's Fantasy Store"	1:29
13.	"Albert Goes To Hubert's House"	0:43
14.	"Albert Tells His Story"	1:37
15.	"Albert Shop Fantasy In Carriage"	0:46
16.	"Helen And Albert In Café"	1:20
17.	"Albert Counting His Money Again"	1:14
18.	"The Fever"	2:16
19.	"Helen Tells Joe"	0:51
20.	"The Beach"	1:35
21.	"Helen's Theme"	2:11
22.	"Helen At Albert's Door"	1:05
23.	"Dr. Holloran In Albert's Room"	0:50
24.	"Mrs. Baker Finds The Book"	0:33
25.	"Albert Nobbs Finale"	4:04
Total length:		43:42

== Accolades ==
Award	Category	Recipient	Result
Golden Globe Awards	Best Original Song	"Lay Your Head Down" by Brian Byrne and Glenn Close	Nominated
Houston Film Critics Society	Best Original Song	"Lay Your Head Down" by Brian Byrne and Glenn Close	Nominated
Irish Film & Television Academy	Best Original Score	Brian Byrne	Won
Satellite Awards	Best Original Song	"Lay Your Head Down" by Brian Byrne and Glenn Close	Won
World Soundtrack Awards	Best Original Song Written Directly for a Film	Glenn Close, Brian Byrne and Sinéad O'Connor	Won

== Personnel ==
Credits adapted from CD liner notes.

Album credits

- Music composer and producer – Brian Byrne
- Musical assistance, music preparation, score supervisor – John Byrne
- Recording – Ciaran Byrne, Umberto Belfiore
- Recording assistance – Damien Chennell
- Mixing – Ciaran Byrne
- Mixing assistance – Michael Manning
- Mastering – Bernie Grundman
- Executive producer – Robert Townson
- Manager – Anthony Long

Performer credits

- Performer – RTÉ Concert Orchestra
- Orchestrator, conductor, piano, harpsichord – Brian Byrne
- Guitar, mandolin – Bill Shanley
- Harp – Geraldine O'Doherty
- Violin – Ken Rice
- Whistle – Fraser Fifield
- Leader – Mia Cooper
- Liner notes – Glenn Close
