= The Quicksilver Meat Dream =

Studio album by I Mother Earth
- Released: April 8, 2003
- Recorded: 2002
- Genre: Alternative rock, progressive rock
- Length: 65:33
- Label: Universal
- Producer: David Bottrill, Jagori Tanna

I Mother Earth chronology
Earth, Sky, and Everything in Between (2001)	The Quicksilver Meat Dream (2003)

The Quicksilver Meat Dream is the fourth album by the Canadian alternative rock band I Mother Earth, released by Universal on April 8, 2003. It is allegedly a concept album, though the details on the concept are left to the fans.

The album retained the instrumental jams and cryptic lyrics of prior albums, but largely strayed from the band's psychedelic past. Instead, it offered a dark modern metal sound with industrial elements, and at times the band's greatest emphasis on progressive rock to date.

== Personnel ==
- Brian Byrne – vocals
- Jagori Tanna – guitars, backing vocals
- Bruce Gordon – bass
- Christian Tanna – drums

== Track listing ==
All songs written by Jagori and Christian Tanna

No.	Title	Length
1.	"0157:H7"	3:47
2.	"Choke"	4:18
3.	"I is Us"	5:42
4.	"God Rocket (Into the Heart of Las Vegas)"	6:49
5.	"Like the Sun"	4:16
6.	"Hell & Malfunction"	7:01
7.	"Soft Bomb Salad"	7:38
8.	"Juicy"	4:11
9.	"No Coma"	4:28
10.	"Meat Dreams: I. Umbilical Transmissions; II. We Be Nine; III. That's Quite an Erection, Eric; IV. Blondes and Bluster"	8:19
11.	"Passenger" (actual track ends at 3:33, and after four minutes of silence continues with an instrumental hidden track at 7:22.)	9:00
Total length:		65:33

== Footnotes ==
1. EMI released Earth, Sky and Everything in Between, an album of B-sides and live recordings, against the band's wishes in 2001. It is technically the fourth I Mother Earth album though not considered part of the discography.
