= Alex Lifeson =

Canadian guitarist (born 1953)

Alex Lifeson OC
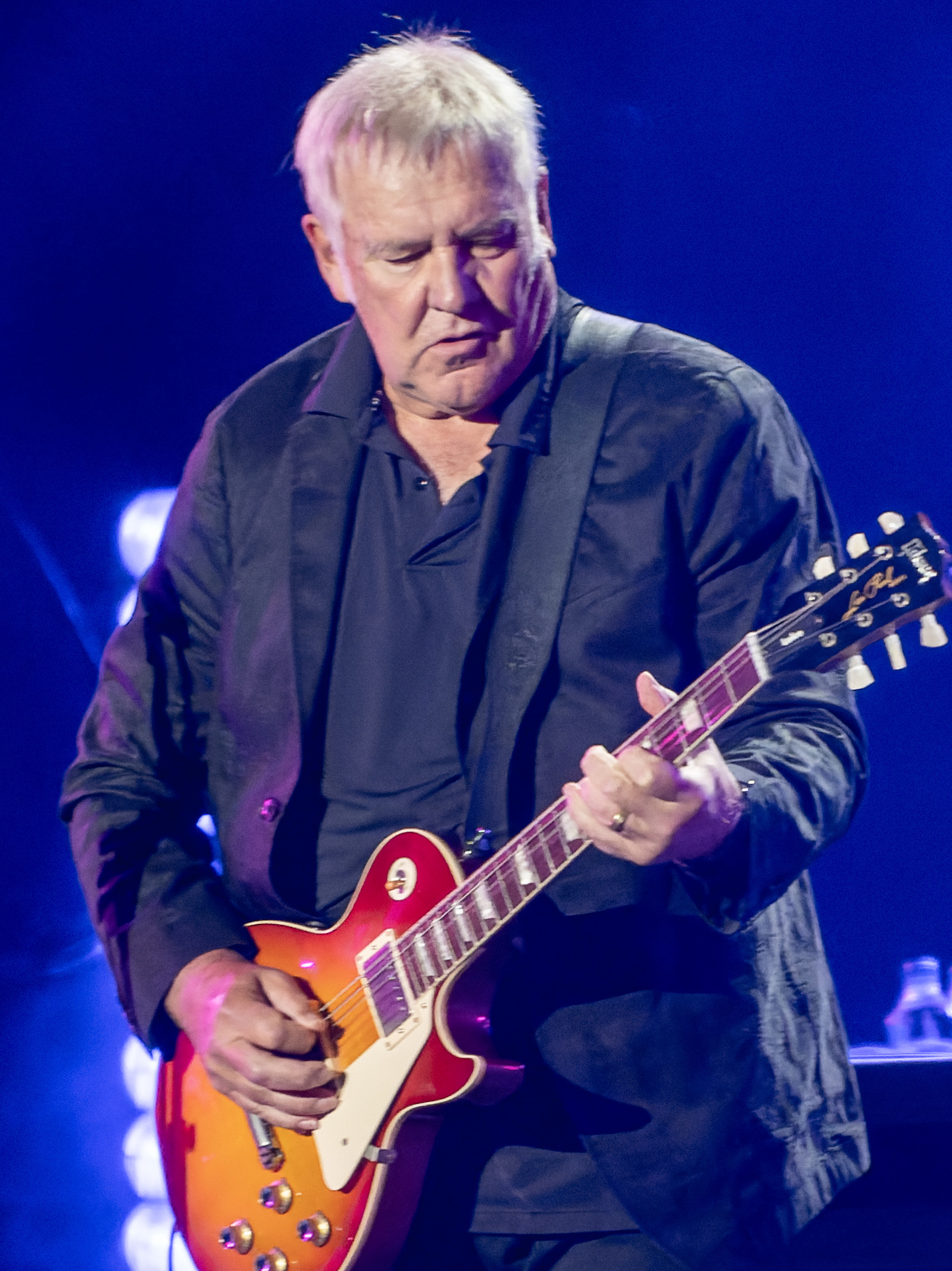
- Lifeson performing in 2022

Background information
- Also known as: Lerxst
- Born: Aleksandar Živojinović; August 27, 1953 (age 73); Fernie, British Columbia, Canada
- Origin: Toronto, Ontario, Canada
- Genres: Progressive rock; hard rock; heavy metal
- Occupations: Musician; songwriter
- Instruments: Guitar
- Years active: 1963–present
- Member of: Rush; Envy of None
- Formerly of: Big Dirty Band
- Spouse: Charlene McNicol (m. 1975)
- Website: alexlifeson.com

Aleksandar Živojinović (born August 27, 1953), known professionally as Alex Lifeson (/ˈlaɪfsən/), is a Canadian musician, best known as the guitarist for the rock band Rush. In 1968, he co-founded a band (which later became Rush) with drummer John Rutsey and bassist and lead vocalist Jeff Jones. One month later, Jones was succeeded by Geddy Lee and in 1974, Rutsey was succeeded by Neil Peart, at which point the lineup remained unchanged until the band's initial dissolution in 2015; Lifeson and Lee eventually reformed Rush in 2025, with Anika Nilles as a live drummer. Lifeson is the only member of Rush to have stayed in the band throughout its entire existence and, alongside Lee, the only member to appear on all of the band's albums.

With Rush, Lifeson played electric and acoustic guitar, and various other string instruments including mandola, mandolin, and bouzouki. He also performed backing vocals in live performances and select studio recordings, and occasionally played keyboards and bass pedal synthesizers. Each band member sometimes performed real-time on-stage triggering of sampled instruments. They became Officers of the Order of Canada in 1996, as the first rock band to be so honoured as a group. In 2013, he was inducted with Rush into the Rock and Roll Hall of Fame. Lifeson was ranked 98th on Rolling Stone's list of the 100 greatest guitarists of all time and third (after Eddie Van Halen and Brian May) in a Guitar World readers' poll listing the 100 greatest guitarists.

Though the bulk of Lifeson's work in music has been with Rush, he has also contributed to a body of work outside the band, including a solo album titled Victor (1996), and two albums with Envy of None, a band that Lifeson formed after Peart's death in 2020. Aside from music, Lifeson has been a painter, a licensed aircraft pilot, an actor, and the former part-owner of a Toronto bar and a restaurant called The Orbit Room, which closed in 2020.

== Biography ==
=== Early life ===
Lifeson was born Aleksandar Živojinović (Serbian: Александар Живојиновић) in Fernie, British Columbia on August 27, 1953. His parents, Nenad and Melanija Živojinović, were Serb immigrants from Yugoslavia. He was raised in Toronto. His stage surname of "Lifeson" is a calque of his birth surname Živojinović, which can be literally translated into English as "son of life". His formal musical education began on the viola, but he abandoned it in favour of the guitar at the age of 12. Lifeson recalls what inspired him to play guitar in a 2008 interview:

My brother-in-law played flamenco guitar. He lent his guitar to me and I grew to like it. When you're a kid, you don't want to play an accordion because it would be too boring. But your parents might want you to play one, especially if you're from a Yugoslavian family like me.

His first guitar was a Christmas gift from his father, a six-string Kent classical acoustic which was later replaced by a red 1967 Canora hollowbody. During his adolescent years, he was influenced primarily by the likes of Jimi Hendrix, Pete Townshend, Tony Iommi, Jeff Beck, Ritchie Blackmore, Hank Marvin, Eric Clapton, George Harrison, Jimmy Page, Steve Hackett, Alvin Lee, Billy Gibbons, Johnny Winter, Denny Laine, and Allan Holdsworth; he explained in 2011 that "Clapton's solos seemed a little easier and more approachable. I remember sitting at my record player and moving the needle back and forth to get the solo in 'Spoonful.' But there was nothing I could do with Hendrix." In 1963, Lifeson met future Rush drummer John Rutsey in school. Both interested in music, they decided to form a band. Lifeson was primarily a self-taught guitarist with the only formal instruction coming from a high school friend in 1971 who taught classical guitar lessons. This training lasted for roughly a year and a half.

When Lifeson was 17, he had an argument with his parents about his future; he wanted to drop out of high school to pursue his dream of becoming a professional guitarist. A video of the argument was part of a 1973 Canadian documentary, Come On Children, about the struggles of 10 adolescents. The argument was also included in two documentaries about Rush, Beyond the Lighted Stage (2010) and Time Stand Still (2016).

=== Rush ===
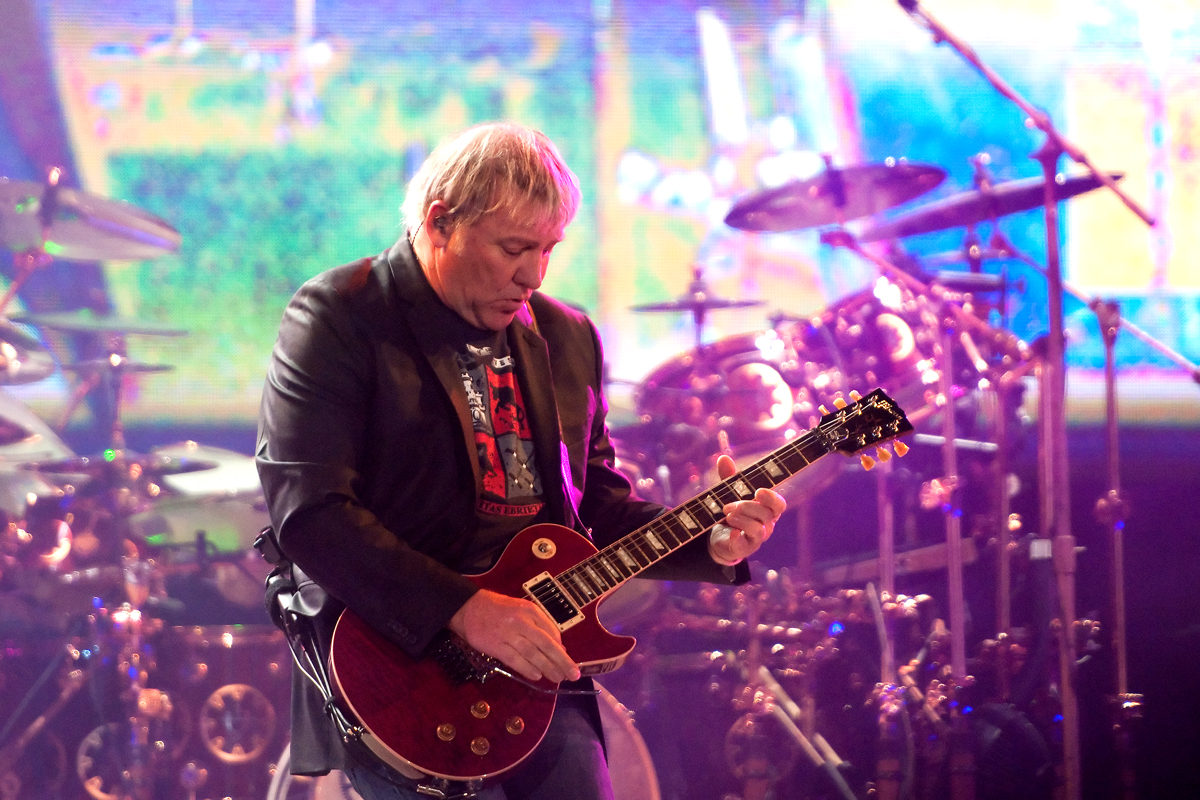
Lifeson played in the 2010–2011 Time Machine Tour, Ahoy, Rotterdam, the Netherlands (May 27, 2011).

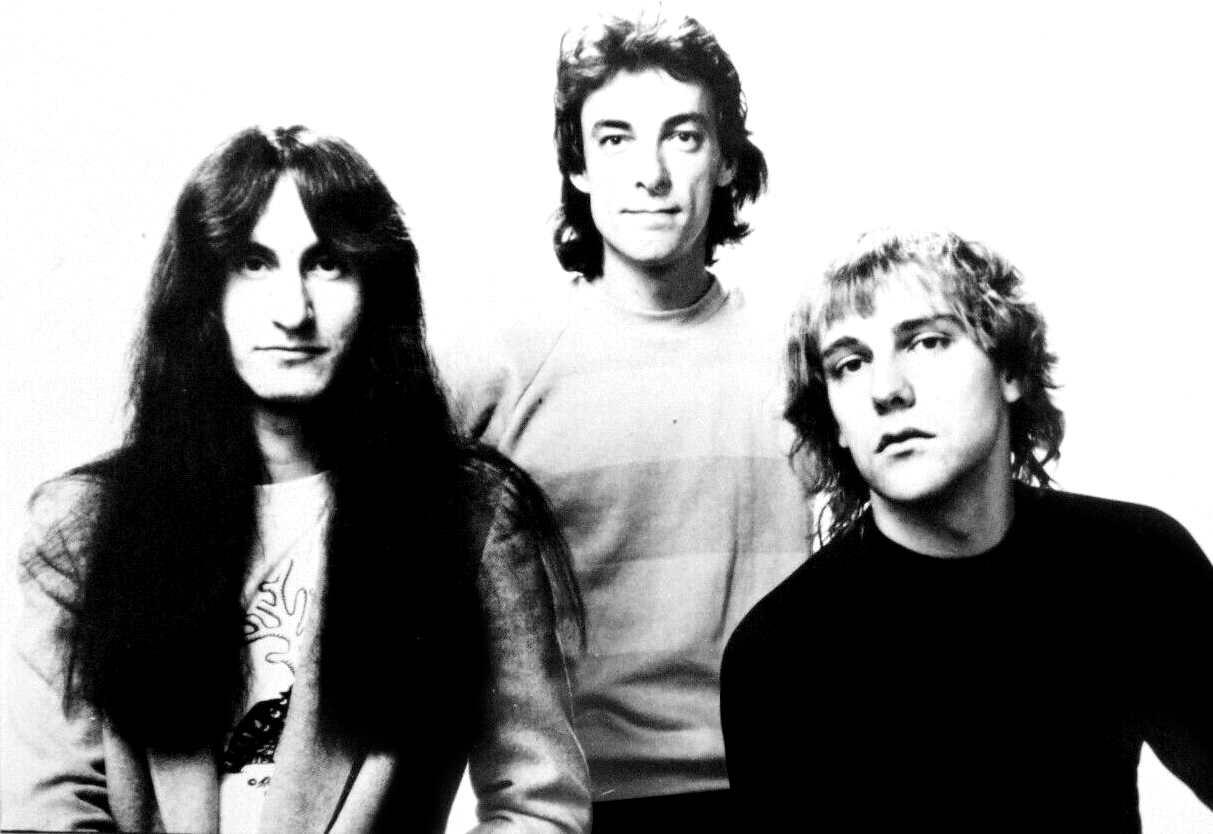
Promotional press photo of Rush, with Lifeson on the right

Lifeson's neighbour John Rutsey began experimenting on a rented drum kit. In 1968, Lifeson and Rutsey formed The Projection, which disbanded a few months later. In August 1968, following the recruitment of original bassist and vocalist Jeff Jones, Lifeson and Rutsey founded Rush. Geddy Lee, a high school friend of Lifeson, assumed Jones's role soon after.

Rush was on hiatus for several years starting in 1997 owing to personal tragedies in Neil Peart's life, and Lifeson had not picked up a guitar for at least a year following those events. However, after some work in his home studio and on various side projects, Lifeson returned to the studio with Rush to begin work on 2002's Vapor Trails. Vapor Trails is the first Rush album since the 1970s to lack keyboards—as such, Lifeson used over 50 different guitars in what Shawn Hammond of Guitar Player called "his most rabid and experimental playing ever." Geddy Lee was amenable to leaving keyboards off the album due in part to Lifeson's ongoing concern about their use. Lifeson's approach to the guitar tracks for the album eschewed traditional riffs and solos in favour of "tonality and harmonic quality." Rush continued to record and perform until Peart's retirement in 2015. Lifeson and Lee announced a reunion of the band on October 6, 2025, with Anika Nilles filling in for Peart.

=== Victor ===
His first major outside work is his solo project, Victor, released in 1996. It was attributed as a self-titled work, where the name Victor is attributed as the artist and the album title. This was done deliberately as an alternative to issuing the album explicitly under Lifeson's name (although the rerelease on vinyl attributes the album to his name). The title track is from the W. H. Auden poem, also entitled "Victor". Both son Adrian and wife Charlene also contributed to the album.

=== Side projects ===
Lifeson has also contributed to other bands' musical efforts. For Platinum Blonde's 1985 album Alien Shores, he performed guitar solos on the songs "Crying Over You" and "Holy Water". In 1990, he played guitar on Lawrence Gowan's album Lost Brotherhood. In 1995, he guested on two tracks on Tom Cochrane's Ragged Ass Road album and then in 1996 on I Mother Earth's "Like a Girl" from the Scenery and Fish album. In 1997, he appeared on the Merry Axemas: A Guitar Christmas album. Lifeson played "The Little Drummer Boy" which was released as track 9 on the album.

In 2006, Lifeson formed the Big Dirty Band, to provide original soundtrack material for Trailer Park Boys: The Movie. Lifeson jammed regularly with the Dexters (the Orbit Room house band from 1994 to 2004). Lifeson made a guest appearance on the 2007 album Fear of a Blank Planet by UK progressive rock band Porcupine Tree, contributing a solo during the song "Anesthetize". He also appeared on the 2008 album Fly Paper by Detroit progressive rockers Tiles on the track "Sacred and Mundane".

Outside band-related endeavours, Lifeson composed the theme for the first season of the science-fiction TV series Andromeda. He produced three songs from the album Away from the Sun by 3 Doors Down. He was executive producer and contributor to the 2014 album "Come to Life" by Keram Malicki-Sanchez, playing guitar on the songs "Mary Magdalene", "Moving Dark Circles" and "The Devil Knows Me Well," and later on Keram's subsequent singles "Artificial Intelligence," (2019), "That Light," (2020) and "Rukh." (2021). Lifeson is featured on Marco Minnemann's 2017 release Borrego, on which he played guitars on three songs and co-wrote the track "On That Note". In 2018, he played lead guitar on Fu Manchu's 18-minute mostly instrumental track "Il Mostro Atomico" from the group's Clone of the Universe album. In 2019 he was featured on the song "Charmed" from the Don Felder solo album American Rock 'n' Roll.

On June 15, 2021, Lifeson released two new instrumental songs, "Kabul Blues" and "Spy House" on his website alexlifeson.com. The songs were released as a self-titled project. Andy Curran played bass on both songs, and drums on "Spy House" were done by David Quinton Steinberg.

=== Envy of None ===
After Rush dissolved in 2018 and Neil Peart died in 2020, Lifeson formed the supergroup Envy of None with himself on guitar, mandola and banjo; Alfio Annibalini on guitar and keyboards; Andy Curran on bass, guitar and backing vocals; and Maiah Wynne on lead vocals and keyboards.

The first single, "Liar", from Envy of None's debut album was released on January 12, 2022. Envy of None's self-titled debut album, which includes "Liar," "Kabul Blues," and "Spy House," was released on April 8.

Envy of None issued their sophomore effort, Stygian Wavz, on March 28, 2025.

=== Television and film appearances ===
Lifeson has made cameos in TV shows and films, including Trailer Park Boys media.

His debut was as himself, under his birth name, in the 1973 Canadian documentary film Come on Children.

In 2008, Rush played "Tom Sawyer" at the end of an episode of The Colbert Report. According to Colbert, this was their first appearance on American television as a band in 33 years. Rush has a cameo in the 2009 comedy I Love You, Man.

The role of Dr. Funtime in The Drunk and On Drugs Happy Funtime Hour was originally written with Lifeson in mind, but due to scheduling conflicts the role was given to Maury Chaykin instead.

=== Book forewords ===
Lifeson has written forewords to four books: Behind the Stage Door by Rich Engler in 2013; Shredders!: The Oral History Of Speed Guitar (And More) by Greg Prato in 2017; Geddy Lee's Big Beautiful Book of Bass by Geddy Lee in 2018; and Domenic Troiano: His Life and Music by Mark Doble and Frank Troiano in 2021.

=== Legal troubles ===
On New Year's Eve 2003, Lifeson, his son and his daughter-in-law were arrested at the Ritz-Carlton hotel in Naples, Florida. Lifeson, after intervening in an altercation between his son and police, was accused of assaulting a sheriff's deputy in what was described as a drunken brawl. In addition to suffering a broken nose at the hands of the officers, Lifeson and his son were both repeatedly tased. In April 2005, Lifeson and his son entered into a plea bargain with the local prosecutor for the State's Attorney's office to avoid jail time by pleading no contest to a first-degree misdemeanor charge of resisting arrest without violence. As part of the plea agreement, Lifeson and his son were each sentenced to 12 months of probation with the adjudication of that probation suspended. Legal claims against the Ritz-Carlton were settled out of court on a confidential basis in August 2008. In his book Roadshow: Landscape with Drums – A Concert Tour by Motorcycle, Neil Peart relates the band's perspective on the events of that New Year's Eve.

== Guitar equipment ==
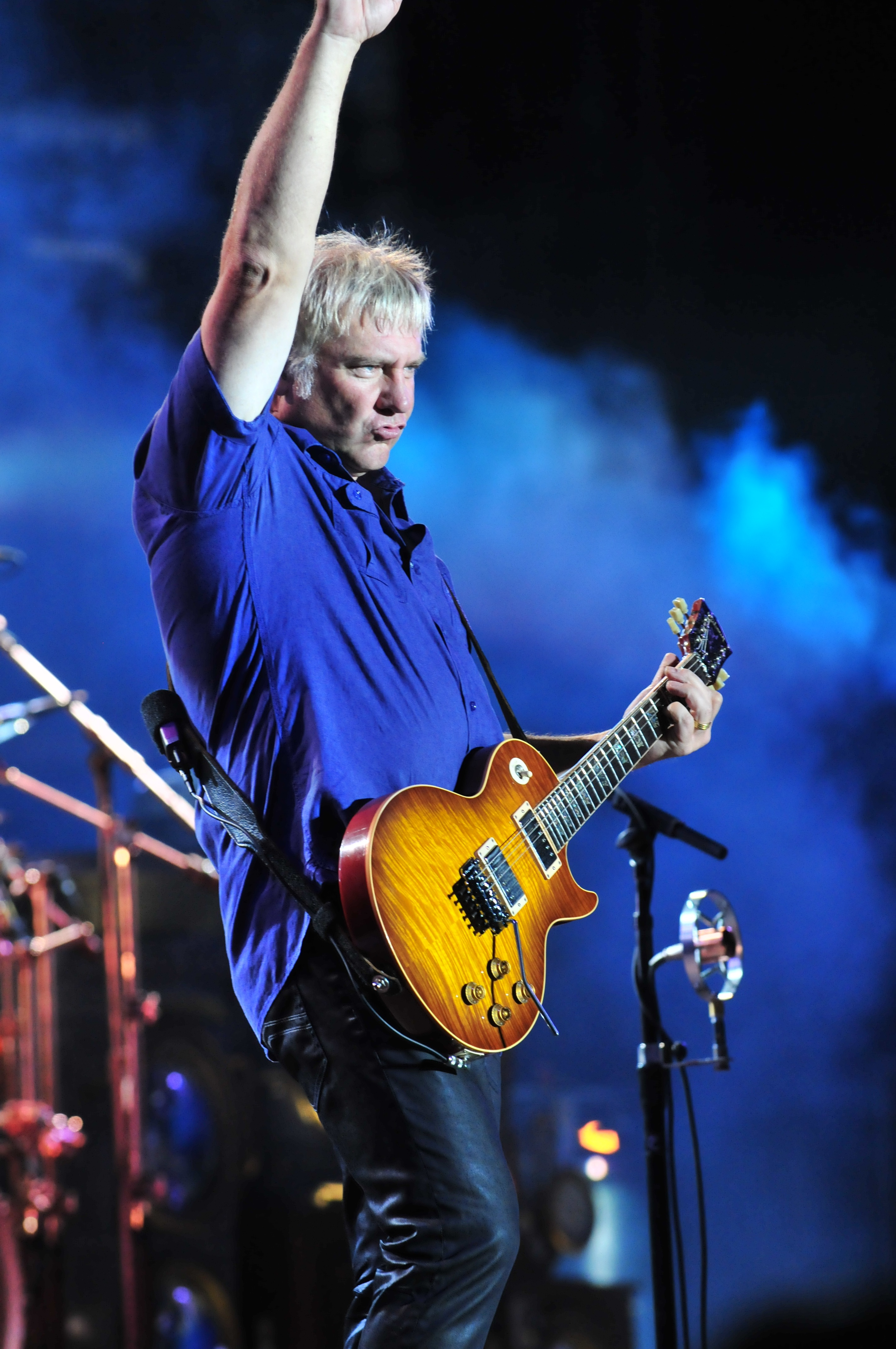
Lifeson played his Gibson Les Paul in the 'Heritage Cherry Sunburst'. This guitar has been modified to incorporate a Floyd Rose tremolo.

=== Early Rush (1970s) ===
In Rush's early career, Lifeson used a Gibson ES-335 for the first tour. In 1976, Lifeson bought a 1974 Gibson Les Paul. He used both guitars until the late 1970s. He had a Fender Stratocaster with a Bill Lawrence humbucker and Floyd Rose vibrato bridge as backup "and for a different sound." For the A Farewell to Kings sessions, Lifeson began using a Gibson EDS-1275 for the song "Xanadu" and his main guitar became a white Gibson ES-355. During this period Lifeson used Hiwatt amplifiers. He played a twelve-string Gibson B-45 on songs like "Closer to the Heart."

=== 1980s and 1990s ===
Lifeson in 1982

From 1980 to 1986, Lifeson used four identically modified Stratocasters, all of them equipped with the Floyd Rose bridge. As a joke, he called these Hentor Sportscasters – a made-up name inspired by Peter Henderson's name, who was the producer of Grace Under Pressure. He would start using them again twenty years later. He also played a Gibson Howard Roberts Fusion and an Ovation Adamas acoustic/electric guitar. By 1987, Lifeson switched to Signature guitar, though describing them as "awful to play—very uncomfortable ... had a particular sound I liked." He primarily used PRS guitars in the later-half of the 1990 Presto tour, and again during the recording of Roll The Bones in 1990/1991. He would continue to play PRS for the next sixteen years through the recording and touring of Counterparts, Test for Echo, and Vapor Trails, and in the R30 tour. During this period, he also played several Fender Telecasters.

=== 2000s onward: Return to Gibson guitars ===
In 2011, Lifeson said that for the past few years he "used Gibson almost exclusively. There's nothing like having a low-slung Les Paul over my shoulder."

In early 2011, Gibson introduced the "Alex Lifeson Axcess", a guitar specially designed for him. These are custom made Les Pauls with Floyd Rose tremolo systems and piezoacoustic pick-ups. He used these two custom Les Pauls on the Time Machine Tour. These guitars are also available through Gibson, in a viceroy Brown or Crimson colour. Lifeson used these two guitars heavily on the tour.

For the 2012-13 "Clockwork Angels" tour, Gibson built an Alex Lifeson Axcess model in black which became Lifeson's primary guitar for much of the show. For all acoustic work, he played one of his Axcess guitars using the piezo pick-ups; no acoustic guitars were used at all in the Clockwork Angels show.

Gibson introduced an Alex Lifeson R40 Les Paul Axcess signature guitar in June 2015. This is a limited edition with 50 guitars signed and played by Lifeson, and another 250 available without the signature.

At the 2017 Winter NAMM Show, Gibson representative Mike Voltz introduced an Antique White Gibson Custom Alex Lifeson Signature ES Les Paul semi-hollow guitar, a hybrid of a Les Paul Custom & an ES 335, with only 200 made. Voltz also introduced the Antique White as a new color from Gibson for this Custom (note: Gibson names this color as 'Classic White' on their web site which may be an error due to other Gibson reps labeling it as Antique White). Alex played this Custom on the last Rush tour.

=== Amplification ===
In 2005, Hughes & Kettner introduced an Alex Lifeson signature series amplifier; Lifeson donates his royalties from the sale of these signature models to UNICEF.

=== Effects ===
For effects, Lifeson is known to use chorus, phase shifting, delay and flanging. Throughout his career, he has used well-known pedals such as the Echoplex delay pedal, Electro-Harmonix Electric Mistress flanger, the BOSS CE-1 chorus and the Dunlop crybaby wah, among others.

Lifeson and his guitar technician Scott Appleton have discussed in interviews Lifeson's use of Fractal Audio's Axe-FX, Apple Inc.'s MainStage, and Native Instruments' Guitar Rig.

== Other instruments ==
=== Strings ===
In addition to acoustic and electric guitars, Lifeson has also played mandola, mandolin, and bouzouki on some Rush studio albums, including Test for Echo, Vapor Trails and Snakes & Arrows. For his Victor project and Little Drummer Boy for the Merry Axemas album, he also played bass and programmed synthesizers.

=== Electronics ===
During live Rush performances, Lifeson used MIDI controllers that enabled him to use his free hands and feet to trigger sounds from digital samplers and synthesizers, without taking his hands off his guitar. (Prior to this, Lifeson used Moog Taurus Bass Pedals before they were replaced by Korg MIDI pedals in the 1980s.) Lifeson and his bandmates shared a desire to accurately depict songs from their albums when playing live performances. Toward this goal, beginning in the late 1980s the band equipped their live performances with a capacious rack of samplers. The band members used these samplers in real-time to recreate the sounds of non-traditional instruments, accompaniments, vocal harmonies, and other sound "events" that are familiarly heard on the studio versions of the songs. In live performances, the band members shared duties throughout most songs, with each member triggering certain sounds with his available limbs, while playing his primary instrument(s).

== Influence ==
Many guitarists have cited Lifeson as an influence, such as Paul Gilbert of Mr. Big, John Petrucci of Dream Theater, Steven Wilson of Porcupine Tree, Jim Martin of Faith No More, Denis "Piggy" D'Amour of Voivod, Parris Mayhew formerly of Cro-Mags, and John Wesley.

James Hetfield from Metallica named Lifeson one of the best rhythm guitarists of all time. Marillion guitarist Steve Rothery has expressed his admiration for Lifeson's "dexterity" as a live performer; he also described Rush as a "fantastic live band". Jazz guitarist Kurt Rosenwinkel, after citing him as an influence, praised his "incredible sound and imagination".

== Personal life ==
Lifeson's first girlfriend, Charlene, gave birth to their eldest son, Justin, in October 1970. The couple married in 1975; their second son, Adrian, was born two years later. Adrian is also involved in music, and performed on "At the End" and "The Big Dance" from Lifeson's 1996 solo project, Victor.

Aside from music, Lifeson has been a painter, a licensed aircraft pilot, an actor, and the former part-owner of a Toronto bar and a restaurant called The Orbit Room, which closed in 2020.

== Awards and honours ==
- "Best Rock Talent" by Guitar for the Practicing Musician in 1983
- "Best Rock Guitarist" by Guitar Player Magazine in 1984 and May 2008
- Runner-up for "Best Rock Guitarist" in Guitar Player in 1982, 1983, 1985, 1986
- Inducted into the Guitar for the Practicing Musician Hall of Fame, 1991
- 1996 – Officer of the Order of Canada, along with bandmates Geddy Lee and Neil Peart. Rush is the first rock band to be honoured as a group.
- 2007 – Main belt asteroid "(19155) Lifeson" named after Alex Lifeson
- "Best Article" for "Different Strings" in Guitar Player (September 2007 issue).
- Most Ferociously Brilliant Guitar Album (Snakes & Arrows) – Guitar Player Magazine, May 2008
- 2013 – With Rush, Rock and Roll Hall of Fame inductee

== Discography ==
=== Solo ===
Year	Title	Alias
1996	Victor	Victor

=== With Envy of None ===
Year	Title	Type
2022	Envy of None	Album
2022	"Liar"	Single
2022	"Look Inside"	Single
2022	"Enemy"/"You'll Be Sorry"	Single
2023	That Was Then	EP
2024	"Not Dead Yet"	Single
2024	"Under the Stars"	Single
2025	Stygian Wavz	Album

=== Collaborations ===
Year	Title	Collaborator	Notes
2002	Gene Roddenberry's Andromeda	Matthew McCauley	Released on GNP Crescendo
2019	Lovers Calling (single)	Marco Minnemann	Featuring Lifeson on guitar, Minnemann on drums, Mohini Dey on bass and Maiah Wynne on vocals
2025	The Great Lakes Suite	Rheostatics	

=== Appearances ===
Year	Title	Artist	Notes
1980	Universal Juveniles	Max Webster	On the track Battle Scar, Lifeson along with fellow Rush band members, Geddy Lee and Neil Peart play their respective instruments with Lee performing co-lead vocals.
1985	Alien Shores	Platinum Blonde	Features Lifeson's guitar solos on two tracks including "Crying Over You" single.
1988	Serious Business	Greenway	Album by fellow Canadian Brian Greenway (of bands April Wine, Mashmakhan and the Dudes), featuring Lifeson on guitar on the first track and single "In The Danger Zone"
1989/1990	Smoke On The Water	Rock Aid Armenia	Charity single re-recording song by British rock band Deep Purple organised by frontman Ian Gillan, Lifeson played alongside many other musicians including members of Deep Purple, Pink Floyd, Yes, Queen, Iron Maiden, Black Sabbath, Led Zeppelin and ELP.
1990	Lost Brotherhood	Gowan	Lifeson plays guitar on this album by fellow Canadian Lawrence Gowan of Styx and also on the album's self-titled single.
1995	Hip To The Tip - Live At The Orbit Room	The Dexters	Album by Canadian band The Dexters (house band of The Orbit Room, a bar in Toronto), the band featured Lifeson (under the pseudonym "Alex Dexter") and other members where called Lou, on Hammond B3, Peter on bass, Bernie on guitar and Mike on drums (all members were under the surname "Dexter.")
1995	Ragged Ass Road	Tom Cochrane	Lifeson is credited with guitar and guitar solo on this album by fellow Canadian musician Tom Cochrane. A frequent collaborator with Cochrane is early Rush bassist and vocalist Jeff Jones.
1996	Scenery And Fish	I Mother Earth	Lifeson played additional guitars on one track on this album by Canadian rock band I Mother Earth.
1997	Merry Axemas: A Guitar Christmas	Various	Lifeson played a version of "The Little Drummer Boy" on this Christmas-oriented tribute album organised by fellow guitarist Steve Vai, also featured guitarists Joe Satriani, Joe Perry, Steve Morse, Jeff Beck and Eric Johnson.
2006	Born4	Jakalope	Lifeson (credited as Alex Liefson under Jakalope 2) is credited as a performer on this album by Canadian group Jakalope and also co-wrote one track.
2006	Have You Seen Lucky?	John Kastner	Lifeson is credited on this album by fellow Canadian John Kastner, Kastner is most famous for being a former member of hardcore punk band Asexuals.
2006	Better Days	Edwin	Lifeson plays guitar on two track on this album by alternative rock singer Edwin, who also participated in Lifeson's solo project Victor 10 years prior.
2007	Fear Of A Blank Planet	Porcupine Tree	Lifeson plays a guitar solo on the first movement of "Anesthetize" by English progressive rock band Porcupine Tree. His solo would later be re-imagined and performed by touring guitarist John Wesley in live shows. The album also features a contribution by King Crimson guitarist Robert Fripp.
2008	Fly Paper	Tiles	Lifeson plays various guitars on one track on this album by American prog rock band Tiles, including assorted textures, lead guitar, rhythm guitar and 12-string acoustic guitar. The album also features artwork and design from frequent Rush collaborator Hugh Syme.
2014	Disconnect	John Wesley	Lifeson plays guitar on one track on this album by American guitarist John Wesley, Wesley had performed with Lifeson on the previously mentioned song by Porcupine tree (when Lifeson contributed guitar and Wesley contributed backing vocals).
2014	Come to Life	Keram	Lifeson is credited, alongside 4 other guitarists, with electric guitar on this album by Keram (full name Keram Malicki-Sánchez), who is a member of band Blue Dog Pict.
2016	RES 9	Rik Emmett & RESolution9	Lifeson is features on two tracks on this album by Rk Emmett of the Canadian rock band Triumph, one track on his own and on another with Dream Theatre frontman and fellow Canadian James LaBrie.
2017	Borrego	Marco Minnemann	Lifeson is featured on guitars on this album by German rock drummer and musician Marco Minnemann, who has performed with Steven Wilson, U.K. and Jordan Rudess, Lifeson plays guitars on 3 tracks (including one bonus track), and wrote one. He is credited with acoustic guitar, guitar reverse, and FX and guitar solos.
2018	Clone Of The Universe	Fu Manchu	Lifeson is credited with additional guitars on one track on this album by America stoner rock band Fu Manchu.
2018	Walking In The Wild Land	Jim McCarty	Lifeson is credited with lead guitar on one track on Yardbirds member Jim McCarty. The album also features keyboards from Rush collaborator Hugh Syme.
2018	A Holiday Greeting From West End Phoenix	Various	Christmas release featuring vocals from Lifeson and Lee.
2019	My Sister	Marco Minnemann	Lifeson is credited as a special guest on this album by German drummer Marco Minnemann, he is credited with writing and with electric and acoustic guitars on two tracks and additional guitars on one.
2019	Nobody Told Me	John Mayall	Lifeson is credited (along with other guitarists, including Joe Bonamassa, Todd Rundgren and Steven Van Zandt) on this album by legendary blues and rock singer and musician John Mayall. He plays guitar on one track.
2019	American Rock 'N' Roll	Don Felder	Lifeson is credited with rhythm acoustic and solo electric on one track on this album by former Eagles lead guitarist Don Felder. The album also features Chad Smith, Slash, Mick Fleetwood and Joe Satriani.
2019	Atheists And Believers	The Mute Gods	Lifeson is credited with 12-string guitar, ambient guitar and mandolin on this album by The Mute Gods, a progressive rock project formed of Nick Beggs (bass, chapman stick, guitar keyboards and vocals known for performing with Steve Hackett and Steven Wilson), Roger King (keyboards and guitar, known for performing with Steve Hackett) and Marco Minnemann (drums and guitar)
2020	II	McStine & Minnemann	Lifeson performs on this album by musicians Randy McStine (guitar, bass, keyboards, vocals) and Marco Minnemann (drums, perucussion, guitar, keyboards and bass). He performs guitar on the final track.
2020	Eternity Now	Big Sugar	Lifeson performs guitar on the first and self titled track on this album by Canadian rock band Big Sugar.
2021	The Atlas Underground Flood	Tom Morello	Lifeson plays guitar and wrote (alongside Kirk Hammett of Metallica) on one track on this album by Rage Against the Machine member Tom Morello.
