= Blue Green Orange =

Studio album by I Mother Earth
- Released: July 13, 1999
- Recorded: November 1998 – March 1999
- Studios: Stigsound & Studio Morin Heights (drum tracks and mixing)
- Genres: Funk metal, alternative rock
- Length: 63:51
- Label: Universal
- Producers: Paul Northfield, Jagori Tanna

I Mother Earth chronology
Scenery and Fish (1996)	Blue Green Orange (1999)	Earth, Sky, and Everything in Between (2001)

Singles from Blue Green Orange
- 1. "Summertime in the Void" Released: 1999; 2. "All Awake" Released: 1999; 3. "When Did You Get Back from Mars?" Released: 2000

Professional ratings
Review scores
Source	Rating
AllMusic	3.5/5 stars
Sputnikmusic	4/5 stars

Blue Green Orange is the third album by the Canadian rock band I Mother Earth, released by Universal on July 13, 1999. It was the band's first album with new lead singer Brian Byrne. The album sparked three singles: "Summertime in the Void", "All Awake", and "When Did You Get Back from Mars?". The album featured covers in blue, green, or orange. The album was certified gold in Canada. The album was voted as the fourth best Canadian album of 1999 by Chart readers.

The album, while still in the vein of the prior jam-oriented albums, was mellower and offered several twists. These included tribal rhythms, computerized loops (most notable on "Infinity Machine") and instrumental elements similar to modern indie rock.

== Recording ==
The album was again produced by Jag Tanna and Paul Northfield. Bassist Bruce Gordon posted small updates for the fans to read on the bands former website between October 1998 and April 1999, from the time the band began writing and pre-production for the album, all the way up to when the last song was mixed. Pictures of the band in the studio in early 1999 were also posted and some are still accessible via the Wayback Machine, as well as all the update blogs. Recording began at Le Studio for all the drum tracks, and the rest of recording was done at the bands (at the time) new studio, Stigsound. The band did however return to Morin Heights to mix the entire album.

== Track listing ==
All songs written by "I Mother Earth", later revealed to be Jagori and Christian Tanna, except "My Beautiful Deep End", by Jagori Tanna and Brian Byrne.

No.	Title	Length
1.	"Love Your Starfish"	5:56
2.	"All Awake"	6:13
3.	"Gargantua"	4:36
4.	"When Did You Get Back from Mars?"	5:02
5.	"Summertime in the Void"	7:03
6.	"Good for Sule"	5:35
7.	"Cloud Pump"	5:42
8.	"Blacksox"	6:44
9.	"Autumn on Drugs"	6:41
10.	"Infinity Machine"	5:26
11.	"My Beautiful Deep End"	4:42
Total length:		63:51

== Personnel ==
- Brian Byrne – vocals
- Jagori Tanna – guitars, backing vocals
- Bruce Gordon – bass
- Christian Tanna – drums

=== Additional musicians ===
- Geddy Lee – bass on "Good for Sule"
- Daniel Mansilla – percussion
- Armando Borg – percussion
