= Tuesdays, Thursdays and if it Rains =

Tuesdays, Thursdays and if It Rains

Studio album by Brian Byrne
- Released: April 11, 2006
- Recorded: Tattoo Music, Toronto, ON
- Genre: Rock
- Length: 49:51
- Label: Kindling Music
- Producer: Tim Thorney

Tuesdays, Thursdays and if it Rains is the first solo album for Brian Byrne, formerly of I Mother Earth.

The album has hit number 1 on the charts in Belgrade and Israel.

== Track listing ==
1. "Days Go On"
2. "Jen's Song"
3. "Far From Good"
4. "Sweet Love"
5. "Nova Dashboard"
6. "Paper Girl"
7. "Oscar Thomas Finn"
8. "Century Old"
9. "Where Did that Girl Go?"
10. "Tuesdays, Thursdays and if it Rains"
11. "Last Chance"
12. "Long Way from Saturday"

== Singles ==
- Far From Good
- Oscar Thomas Finn (Wish You Well)
