= Tailor Made =

Tailor Made may also refer to:

- Bespoke – clothing made by a tailor
- Tailor Made (album), album by Brian Byrne
- A song by Colbie Caillat from the album Coco
- Brand-name cigarettes

== See also ==
- Taylormade (disambiguation)
