= Dani Stevenson =

American singer

- Also known as: Dani Stevens, The Bride
- Born: September 3, 1980 (age 46); Atlanta, Georgia, U.S.
- Origin: Harlem, New York, U.S.
- Genres: R&B, jazz, soul, funk, hip hop
- Occupations: Singer, songwriter
- Years active: 2001–present
- Labels: Universal; Elektra; Starrlet; Lovers Lane

Dani Stevenson (born September 3, 1980) is an American contemporary R&B singer. She is best known for her background vocals on Nelly's 2002 single "Hot in Herre", which topped the Billboard Hot 100. Her 2002 single, "Honk Your Horn" (featuring Missy Elliott), entered two Hot Singles Sales charts.

== Early life ==
At the age of 12, Dani Stevenson moved from her hometown Atlanta, Georgia, to Harlem, New York. Upon her arrival in Harlem, she had deep aspirations of pursuing a music career. She went on to perform the national anthem at a junior high graduation and appeared in various talent contests. In 1998, she performed at the Greenwich Village open mic circuit.

== Career ==
By August 2001, Stevenson met up with producer Rhemario Webber through a mutual friend and the two teamed up to craft a 10-track demo. The result was a contract deal with Universal Records in February 2002. After signing to Universal, the label suggested Stevenson to contribute vocals to labelmate Nelly's 2002 single, "Hot in Herre"; Stevenson agreed and collaborated with Nelly and producer Pharrell Williams. Stevenson recalled, "Nelly was writing lyrics in his two-way; Pharrell [from the Neptunes] wanted the song to be sexy. He sang it the way he wanted me to sing it, and then I just put my own little stamp on it. It only took about 15 minutes."

Following the song's success, Universal Records gave her the go to prepare a debut album. Stevenson alongside Webber wrote 11 out of the 13 tracks and incorporated the 10-track demo to the debut. The debut album was tentatively titled Is There Another?! and was scheduled for a release in March 2003. The Missy Elliott–produced "Honk Your Horn" was released as the album's lead single on September 17, 2002. Although it was released to the general public that year, it did not begin to chart until October 2003, a year following its original release. On August 6, 2002, the soundtrack to XXX was released and featured Stevenson's song, "Yo, Yo, Yo". The song would be released on April 29, 2003, as the second single from Stevenson's debut. By 2004, Is There Another?! had passed its scheduled release date and its singles still failed to make a proper entry on the Billboard charts. As a result, Stevenson left Universal Records and her debut album was shelved.

In 2006, nearly two years after her departure with Universal, Stevenson contributed to Norman Hedman's Tropique's final studio album, Garden of Forbidden Fruit.

In 2010, Stevenson inked a new deal with Starrlet Entertainment, and released the single "Wishing Well" alongside its music video on September 6 of that same year. In 2011, Stevenson began working with Ruff Ryders rapper DMX. Stevenson contributed vocals to DMX and New Orleans rap group N.O.4's collaborative single, "Tell Ya Friends". By December 2011, Stevenson was featured in the single's music video. In 2012, Stevenson was featured on DMX's album, Undisputed, on the track "Sucka for Love".

== Discography ==
=== Singles ===
List of singles, with selected chart positions, showing year charted and album name
| Title | Year | Peak chart positions | | Album |
| Title | Year | US 100 Sales | US R&B Sales | Album |
|---|---|---|---|---|
| "Honk Your Horn" (featuring Missy Elliott) | 2003 | 24 | 48 | Is There Another?! |
| "Yo, Yo, Yo" | 2004 | — | 71 | Is There Another?! |
| "Wishing Well" | 2010 | — | — | Non-album singles |
| "Take Your Girl" (featuring Beanz) | 2020 | — | — | Non-album singles |

=== As featured artist ===
List of singles, showing year released and album name
| Title | Year | Album |
|---|---|---|
| "Tell Ya Friends" (N.O.4 featuring DMX and Dani Stevenson) | 2011 | The Beginning |

=== Album guest appearances ===
| Year | Title | Album | Artist(s) |
|---|---|---|---|
| 2002 | "Hot in Herre" | Nellyville | Nelly |
| 2002 | "Yo, Yo, Yo" | XXX | —N/a |
| 2002 | "Headz Up" | Watermelon, Chicken & Gritz | Nappy Roots |
| 2006 | "Garden of Forbidden Fruit" | Garden of Forbidden Fruit | Norman Hedman's Tropique |
| 2009 | "Picture Perfect" | Da Movement, Vol. 1 | Phoenix, Justice aka Martini |
| 2011 | "I'll Still Be Here" | Blaack History | Blaack |
| 2012 | "Sucka for Love" | Undisputed | DMX |

=== Music videos ===
| Year | Title | Director(s) | Ref. |
|---|---|---|---|
| 2002 | "Miss You" | Darren Grant | |
| 2002 | "Headz Up" | —N/a | |
| 2010 | "Wishing Well" | Dani S. | |
| 2011 | "Tell Ya Friends" | Francois Barthe & Jeff Adair | |

== Concert tours ==
Headlining

- 2002: Organic Soul Night (sponsored by Coca-Cola and Ebony)

Joint tours

- 2002: Yardfest Tour (sponsored by Colgate Fresh Confidence and Vibe)
- 2003: ElleGirl (with 3LW and Eve)

== Filmography ==
| Year | Title | Episode | Notes |
|---|---|---|---|
| 2002 | The Jenny Jones Show | 2632 | Aired December 6, 2002; Stevenson performs "Yo, Yo, Yo" |
| 2003 | Marc Dorsey's R&B Live & Unplugged | Pilot | Originally taped on April 2, 2003 |
