= Yo, Yo, Yo =

Single by Dani Stevenson

from the album Music From and Inspired by the Motion Picture xXx: A New Breed of Special Agent
- Released: April 29, 2003
- Recorded: 2002
- Genre: Contemporary R&B, jazz, funk, neo-soul
- Length: 3:32
- Label: Universal Motown Records
- Songwriters: Dani Stevenson, Rhemario Webber
- Producer: Rhemario "Rio Beats" Webber

Dani Stevenson singles chronology
"Honk Your Horn" (2002)	"Yo, Yo, Yo" (2003)	"Wishing Well" (2010)

"Yo, Yo, Yo" is a song by American recording artist, Dani Stevenson. The song was featured in the soundtrack to the 2002 film, XXX and served as the second single for Stevenson's unreleased debut album, Is There Another?!.

== Track listings and formats ==
12" vinyl

1. "Yo, Yo, Yo" (Main)
2. "Yo, Yo, Yo" (Radio)
3. "Yo, Yo, Yo" (Instrumental)
4. "Yo, Yo, Yo" (Accapella)

CD single

1. "Album Version" – 3:32
2. "Instrumental" – 3:52

== Chart performance ==
Chart (2004)	Peak position
US Billboard Hot R&B/Hip-Hop Singles Sales	71
