= Come on Children =

Come On Children
- Directed by: Allan King
- Produced by: Allan King
- Cinematography: William Brayne
- Edited by: Arla Saare
- Production company: Allan King Associates
- Distributed by: Famous Players
- Release date: March 12, 1973 (Ontario Science Centre)
- Running time: 96 minutes
- Country: Canada
- Language: English
- Budget: CA$218,000 (estimated)

Come On Children is a 1973 documentary film by Canadian filmmaker Allan King. The film is a cinéma vérité take on the lives of youth that reside at farm house for a ten-week stay away from families and the city of Toronto.

Filmed in the winter of early 1971, it documents the lives of a group of kids, aged 13 to 19, living together on a farm as a sort of social experiment. There are not any adults supervising and they are not going to school. Film introduces at the start the only narration where King says in that he thought would be interesting to study the characteristics that arise in each person as a result of this experiment.

In part it has the filmmaker revisit the troubled teenager subculture of his film Warrendale, with the hippie-era generational conflicts of the 1960s spilling over into the 1970s. One of the teenagers in the film, aspiring musician Alex Živojinović, would soon go on to fame under the stage name Alex Lifeson.

== Distribution ==
Although completed by 1972, King ended up embroiled in a year-long dispute with Famous Players over its refusal to distribute the film. The company claimed that King was holding up the release by demanding screenings in theatres that Famous Players did not own, a claim which King denied; other sources privately indicated off the record that Famous Players was refusing to distribute the film due to lack of faith in its ability to draw an audience.

By May 1973, King was so frustrated that he was announcing his intention to leave the filmmaking business entirely, although he ultimately did not do so; it was, however, his last documentary film for many years, as he shifted into narrative filmmaking and did not return to the documentary genre until the early 2000s.

The film ultimately premiered at the Ontario Science Centre on March 12, 1973, at a screening organized by Gerald Pratley's Ontario Film Institute. It had a few other screenings at Canadian and international film festivals, but otherwise was never widely distributed, and remained little-seen until being included in The Criterion Collection's The Actuality Dramas of Allan King DVD set in 2010.

In 2023, the film received a free online screening as part of National Canadian Film Day.
