= Stygian Wavz =

Studio album by Envy of None
- Released: March 28, 2025
- Length: 44:27
- Label: Kscope

Envy of None chronology
That Was Then, This Is Now (2023)	Stygian Wavz (2025)

Singles from Stygian Wavz
- 1. "Not Dead Yet" Released: November 1, 2024; 2. "Under the Stars" Released: December 12, 2024; 3. "Stygian Wavz" Released: January 14, 2025; 4. "The Story" Released: March 14, 2025

Stygian Wavz (styled Stij(ē)ən Wāvz on the cover) is the second studio album by Canadian-American art rock supergroup Envy of None. It was released on March 28, 2025, via Kscope in blu-ray, vinyl, CD, box set and digital formats.

== Background ==
Preceded by the group's full-length debut self-titled release, Stygian Wavz comprises eleven tracks with a total runtime of approximately forty-four minutes.

"Not Dead Yet" was released on November 1, 2024, as the first single of the album. It was followed by the second single "Under the Stars" on December 12, 2024. The band released the title track as the third single on January 14, 2025, alongside a music video created using AI, and directed by Mariano Biotico. "The Story" was released as the fourth single on March 14, 2025.

== Reception ==
Professional ratings
Review scores
Source	Rating
Distorted	5/10
Mojo	3/5 stars
Prog	4/5 stars
Record Collector	3/5 stars
Rolling Stone France	4/5 stars
Spill	5/5 stars
Sputnikmusic	3.8/5

In a four-star rating for Rolling Stone France, Mathieu David opined, "Aesthetics and sound experiments become one in this strange and gripping Stygian Waves." Joseph Mastel of Spill gave it a rating of five, called it "a rock masterpiece guaranteed to appeal to any rock fan," noting Maiah Wynne's vocals as "commanding, powerful, and full of raw emotion".

Prog's James McNair commented on Wynne's vocals, "Her sultry, unflustered vocals, sometimes as much breath as note, give a slightly gothic tinge to the electronic prog-pop/industrial rock material on offer," giving the album a four-star rating. Sputnikmusic's Trey praised Wynne's vocals and referred to Stygian Wavz as "an album that rewards patience, pulling the listener in with its delicate intricacies and dreamlike textures – all executed with remarkable finesse."

Rating the album three stars for Mojo, James McNair remarked, "Stygian Waves has a pleasing surety of direction, Wynne galvanizing her bandmates much as Shirley Manson galvanized Butch Vig and co in Garbage." Joel McIver of Record Collector noted, "A bit more variation to the glistening soundscapes would have been welcome, as each track sounds rather like the others, but the core sound is a sweet one," giving it the album a three-star rating. The album received a 5/10 rating from Distorted, whose reviewer Ed Walton described it as "an incredibly frustrating listen", noting that "for die-hards, this is an album you'll love, but for a casual music listener, this album is an incredibly hard sell and will take several listens before you can finish it."

== Track listing ==
Stygian Wavz track listing
No.	Title	Length
1.	"Not Dead Yet"	3:29
2.	"The Story"	4:41
3.	"Under the Stars"	4:32
4.	"Thrill of the Chase"	3:40
5.	"Handle with Care"	4:14
6.	"That Was Then"	3:46
7.	"Raindrops"	3:33
8.	"New Trip"	3:55
9.	"Clouds"	4:02
10.	"The End"	3:58
11.	"Stygian Waves"	3:37
Total length:		44:27

All tracks were written by Envy of None (Andy Curran, Alex Lifeson, Alf Annibalini, Maiah Wynne).
