= Envy of None =

Canadian-American rock supergroup

- Origin: Los Angeles, United States
- Genre: Rock
- Years active: 2021–present
- Label: Kscope
- Members: Alex Lifeson; Andy Curran; Maiah Wynne; Alfio Annibalini
- Website: envyofnone.com

Envy of None (abbreviated as EON) is a Canadian-American rock supergroup formed in 2021 by Rush guitarist Alex Lifeson, along with bassist Andy Curran, vocalist Maiah Wynne, and guitarist and keyboardist Alfio Annibalini. To date, they have released two albums: Envy of None (2022) and Stygian Wavz (2025).

== History ==
In June 2021, Alex Lifeson released two solo instrumental tracks, "Kabul Blues" and "Spy House", on his official website. The new music coincided with the release of the Alex Lifeson Les Paul Standard Axcess model of electric guitar produced by Epiphone and featured Canadian musicians Andy Curran of Coney Hatch on bass and David Quinton Steinberg on drums. Less than a week following the announcement, Lifeson revealed that he had completed ten songs for his new side project, Envy of None, featuring Curran, Alfio Annibalini on guitar, and Maiah Wynne on vocals, with additional contributions from Steinberg and Tim Oxford on drums. The project originated when Curran and Wynne were working on new music, Lifeson noticed and asked to hear. Curran encouraged Lifeson to contribute guitar parts if something interested him, and said: "He played on one track and one became two, and two became three".

The band had hoped to have the music finished for an album release in late 2021, but it was delayed until the next year. On January 12, 2022, they announced that their self-titled debut album would be released on April 8, via Kscope, an independent record label based in London. The first single, "Liar", was issued on the same day. On March 2, 2022, the band released a second single, "Look Inside", and a music video for the song on March 9, 2022.

The band's first studio album is Envy of None, which consists of eleven tracks. It was recorded during the COVID-19 pandemic and released on April 8, 2022. It has been described as having elements of both ambient and industrial music. The last song on the album, the instrumental "Western Sunset", is a tribute to Lifeson's former Rush bandmate, drummer and lyricist Neil Peart. Lifeson composed the song at Peart's Santa Monica home shortly before the drummer's death, in January 2020. The record was ranked as the eighth best guitar album of 2022 by Guitar World readers.

Lifeson has stated that he does not intend to participate in concert tours but will "do a few shows here and there".

In 2022, Envy of None released a single to support UNHCR after the Russian invasion of Ukraine, raising close to $100,000 through this effort.

On April 20, 2023, the group announced the June 9 release of an EP titled That Was Then, This Is Now, featuring remixes of two previously released tracks and three new compositions.

Envy of None's second studio album, Stygian Wavz (styled stij(ē)ən wāvz on the album cover; Stygian Waves on some platforms), was released on March 28, 2025.

== Band members ==
- Alfio Annibalini – guitar, keyboards, programming, backing vocals
- Andy Curran – bass, programming, guitar, stylophone, keyboards, backing vocals
- Alex Lifeson – guitar, mandola, banjo, programming
- Maiah Wynne – lead vocals, keyboards

== Discography ==
Studio albums

- Envy of None (2022)
- Stygian Wavz (2025)

EPs

- That Was Then, This Is Now (2023)

Singles

- "Liar" (2022)
- "Look Inside" (2022)
- "Enemy" / "You'll Be Sorry" (2022)
- "Not Dead Yet" (2024)
- "Under the Stars" (2024)
