= The Orbit Room =

Toronto music venue

- Address: 580A College Street; Toronto, Ontario; Canada
- Owner: Tim Notter, Alex Lifeson
- Capacity: approximately 100
- Type: Live music venue, bar
- Events: Jazz, R&B, funk, soul, rock

Construction
- Opened: October 1994
- Closed: July 2020

The Orbit Room was a live music venue and bar located at 580A College Street in Toronto, Ontario. Co‑founded in 1994 by music promoter Tim Notter and Rush guitarist Alex Lifeson, it became a celebrated destination for nightly performances across jazz, R&B, funk, soul, and rock genres.

== History ==
Originally conceived as a cocktail lounge, the concept evolved into a live music venue when Notter assembled a house band. The Dexters—featuring Lou Pomanti, Bernie LaBarge, Peter Cardinali, and Mike Sloski—anchored the venue through the late 1990s and early 2000s.

Other long-running residencies included:

- Sisters Euclid, a jazz-fusion quartet led by guitarist Kevin Breit. They held a weekly Monday residency for 17 years.
- LMT Connection, a Niagara-based funk/soul band formed in 1989. They held a 21-year Wednesday night residency at the venue.

The club featured a house Hammond B3 organ and regularly hosted organists such as Doug Riley, Michael Fonfara, Scott “Professor Piano” Cushnie, Tony Monaco, Dave Murphy, and Rob Gusevs. The room was designed for sound-first intimacy, with a capacity under 100 and no televisions or ambient noise.

== Operational challenges ==
Notter reported that rent increased from about CA$1,200/month in 1994 to over CA$6,000/month by 2020. Property taxes and insurance premiums also rose steeply, leading to an unsustainable financial model despite consistently strong audience turnout.

== Closure ==
In March 2020, the Orbit Room shut down temporarily in response to COVID-19 restrictions. On 16 July 2020, Notter announced its permanent closure, though he indicated that Orbit-branded shows could continue elsewhere in the future.

== Legacy ==
Over its 25-year run, the Orbit Room became one of Toronto's best-known intimate venues for groove-heavy live music. Its commitment to local musicianship helped cultivate the careers of artists like Sisters Euclid and LMT Connection. The venue's closure was seen as symbolic of the broader struggles faced by small performance spaces during the pandemic.

Tim Notter later began hosting Orbit Room-branded concerts at The Redwood Theatre in east Toronto, maintaining the ethos of the original venue.

== See also ==
- List of music venues in Toronto
