= Scenery and Fish =

Studio album by I Mother Earth
- Released: July 9, 1996
- Recorded: Fall 1995
- Studios: Studio Morin Heights, Quebec; Huff's Place, Arnyard Studios & Number Nine Sound, Toronto.
- Genre: Alternative rock
- Length: 63:08
- Label: Capitol
- Producers: Paul Northfield, Jagori Tanna

I Mother Earth chronology
Dig (1993)	Scenery and Fish (1996)	Blue Green Orange (1999)

Singles from Scenery and Fish
- 1. "One More Astronaut" Released: 1996; 2. "Another Sunday" Released: 1996; 3. "Used to be Alright" Released: 1997; 4. "Raspberry" Released: 1997

Professional ratings
Review scores
Source	Rating
AllMusic	4/5 stars

Scenery and Fish is the second album by the Canadian rock band I Mother Earth, released by Capitol and EMI in 1996. It is the band's most commercially successful album, going double platinum in Canada and selling 320,000 units in Canada by April 1999.

The album is the band's first studio record to feature bassist Bruce Gordon. Writing for the album began around January 1995, pre-production and recording took place in the fall, and mixing was done from November-December 1995. The album was somewhat of a continuance of the band's percussive, psychedelic sound, albeit this time with more of a post-grunge twist tinged with elements of both progressive rock and pop.

== Critical reception ==
Scenery and Fish won the 1996 CASBY Award for "Favourite New Release". The album was nominated for "Rock Album of the Year" at the 1997 Juno Awards.

== Personnel ==
- Edwin – vocals
- Jagori Tanna – guitars, backing vocals
- Bruce Gordon – bass
- Christian Tanna – drums

=== Additional musicians ===
- Alex Lifeson – additional guitar on "Like A Girl"
- Luis Conte – percussion
- Daniel Mansilla – percussion
- Kenny Pearson – Hammond B3 organ

== Track listing ==
(All songs written by "I Mother Earth", later revealed to be Jagori and Christian Tanna)

No.	Title	Length
1.	"Hello Dave!"	0:47
2.	"Like a Girl"	4:40
3.	"One More Astronaut"	5:24
4.	"Another Sunday"	4:05
5.	"Three Days Old"	5:47
6.	"Used to Be Alright"	5:27
7.	"Shortcut to Moncton"	7:56
8.	"Pisser"	5:00
9.	"Raspberry"	5:45
10.	"Songburst & Delirium"	5:55
11.	"Sense of Henry"	5:16
12.	"Earth, Sky & C."	7:06
Total length:		63:08
