= Dig (I Mother Earth album) =

Studio album by I Mother Earth
- Released: August 10, 1993
- Recorded: 1992–93
- Studios: A&M (Hollywood); Rumbo (Canoga Park); Studio 56 (Hollywood); Red Zone (Burbank); Track Record (North Hollywood)
- Genres: Alternative rock; alternative metal; funk metal; grunge; progressive metal
- Length: 67:50
- Label: Capitol
- Producer: Mike Clink

I Mother Earth chronology
Dig (1993)	Scenery and Fish (1996)

Singles from Dig
- 1. "Rain Will Fall " Released: 1993; 2. "Not Quite Sonic " Released: 1993; 3. "So Gently We Go" Released: 1994; 4. "Levitate" Released: 1994

Professional ratings
Review scores
Source	Rating
AllMusic	4/5 stars

Dig is the debut album by the Canadian rock band I Mother Earth, released by Capitol and EMI on August 10, 1993. The album was certified Gold in Canada in its initial run, and stands at platinum today. It also won a Juno Award in 1994 for Best Hard Rock Album.

The album was noted for its metallic sound, balanced with psychedelic-style lyrics and instrumentals, and further backed by Latin percussion. The latter two were often brought into play during lengthy jam sessions.

It is the band's only studio album not to feature bassist Bruce Gordon, who joined the band during the recording sessions and is credited in the album liner notes. However, his parts were actually performed by guitarist and composer Jagori Tanna.

== Personnel ==
- Edwin – vocals
- Jagori Tanna – guitars, backing vocals, bass (actual performer)
- Bruce Gordon – bass (credited)
- Christian Tanna – drums

=== Additional musicians ===
- Luis Conte – percussion
- Armando Borg – percussion
- Mike Finnigan – Hammond B3 organ

== Track listing ==
(All songs written by "I Mother Earth", later revealed to be Jagori and Christian Tanna)

No.	Title	Length
1.	"The Mothers"	2:34
2.	"Levitate"	4:57
3.	"Rain Will Fall"	5:18
4.	"So Gently We Go"	7:04
5.	"Not Quite Sonic"	5:55
6.	"Production"	4:00
7.	"Lost My America"	6:29
8.	"No One"	6:56
9.	"Undone"	5:06
10.	"Basketball"	5:12
11.	"And the Experience"	5:54
12.	"The Universe in You"	8:19
Total length:		67:50

== In other media ==
- "Rain Will Fall" and "Levitate" appeared on the soundtrack for the 2003 video game True Crime: Streets of LA
- "Levitate" is a downloadable track available for the games in the Rock Band series, being also featured in the Metal Track Pack.
