= Taylormade =

Taylormade or Taylor Made may refer to one of several things:

- TaylorMade, a golf equipment and apparel company
- TaylorMade Property Group, a real estate business
- Taylormade Media, a New Zealand media graphics company founded by Ian Taylor (New Zealand businessman)
- Taylor Made Farm, a racehorse breeding farm
- Taylor Made, former ring name of Tori (wrestler)
- Taylor Made (album), a 1982 album by Linda Taylor
- "Taylor Made Freestyle", a 2024 song by Drake

== See also ==
- Tailor Made (disambiguation)
