= Honk Your Horn =

Single by Dani Stevenson featuring Missy Elliott

from the album Is There Another?!
- Released: September 17, 2002
- Recorded: 2002
- Genre: R&B; neo-soul; hip hop
- Length: 3:18 (radio edit)
- Label: Universal Motown Records
- Songwriters: Missy Elliott; Kenneth Cunningham; Jamahl Rye
- Producers: Missy Elliott; Jamahl Rashid

Dani Stevenson singles chronology
| "Hot in Herre" (2002) | "Honk Your Horn" (2002) | "Yo, Yo, Yo" (2003) |

Missy Elliott singles chronology
| "Work It" (2002) | "Honk Your Horn" (2002) | "Gossip Folks" (2002) |

"Honk Your Horn" is a song by American recording artist, Dani Stevenson. The song features production and guest vocals by Missy Elliott. It was released on September 17, 2002, as the lead single for Stevenson's debut album, Is There Another?!. Although the single was released in 2002, it did not chart on Billboard until October 2003.

== Track listings and formats ==
EP version

1. "Honk Your Horn" (featuring Missy Elliott) (Radio Edit) – 3:18
2. "Yo, Yo, Yo" (Snippet) – 1:07
3. "Bogus" (Snippet) – 1:02
4. "It's Like a Jungle" (Snippet) – 1:02
5. "Indecent Proposal" (What Would You Do?) (Snippet) – 1:06

CD single

1. "Radio Edit" – 3:32
2. "Radio Edit w/out Rap" – 3:05
3. "Instrumental" – 3:44

== Chart performance ==
| Chart (2003) | Peak position |
|---|---|
| US Billboard Hot 100 Singles Sales | 24 |
| US Billboard Hot R&B/Hip-Hop Singles Sales | 48 |
