= Tailor Made (album) =

Studio album by Brian Byrne
- Released: September 4, 2007
- Recorded: Central Audio Productions & Signal to Noise Studios, Toronto, ON
- Genre: Country rock
- Length: 40:46
- Label: Kindling Music
- Producers: Brian Byrne & Lorne Hounsell

Tailor Made is the second solo album by Brian Byrne, formerly of I Mother Earth.

== Track listing ==
1. "All I Need Is Love"
2. "Tailor Made"
3. "Beautiful You"
4. "Mountain Feeling"
5. "Easy Come"
6. "Crazy"
7. "Look For Me Now"
8. "Home"
9. "Colder Than The Lake"
10. "The One, The Only (King of Late Night)"
11. "Love You More"

== Personnel ==
- Brian Byrne - Vocals, Guitar, Harmonica
- Gerry Finn - Guitar, Banjo, Vocals
- Lorne Hounsell - Guitar, Banjo, Vocals
- Justin Mahoney - Guitar
- Chris LeDrew - Pedal Steel
- Noel Webb - Drums
- Paul Lomond - Bass
- Ryan Lewchuck - Piano
- Dani Strong - Vocals
- Grant Taylor - Drums (track 2)
- Colin Williams - Drum Editing

== Album credits ==
- Engineer, Mixed - Lorne Hounsell
- Mastered - Richard G. Benoit
- Artwork - Shawn Mackenzie
- Photography - Clint McLean
- Album Design - Jimmy Rose
