= Andy Curran (musician) =

Canadian rock musician

Andy Curran is a Canadian rock musician. He was originally prominent as the founder, vocalist and bassist for the rock band Coney Hatch, with whom he released three albums in the 1980s. Following Coney Hatch's initial breakup, he formed a new band consisting first of guitarists Harold Smith and Ray Buck with drummer Jack Fuller, and then guitarists Michael Borkosky and Simon Brierley with drummer Glenn Milchem. Milchem left the band early on due to his extensive commitments as a session musician, and was replaced by Eddie Zeeman.

They were signed to Alert Records, although the label opted to bill Curran as a solo artist. The self-titled debut album Andy Curran was released in 1990, receiving Juno Award nominations for Most Promising Male Vocalist and Best Metal/Hard Rock Album at the Juno Awards of 1991. Curran won the award for Most Promising Male Vocalist.

Following that album, however, Curran and his bandmates opted to work under the band name Soho 69. As Soho 69, they released the album Scatterbrain in 1993. In 1994, Curran, as a solo artist, recorded a cover of Neil Young's "Cinnamon Girl" for the tribute album Borrowed Tunes: A Tribute to Neil Young.

In the late 1990s, Curran and Brierley reemerged with the new project Caramel, which released a self-titled album in 1998. Curran was also a songwriting collaborator with Kim Mitchell on Mitchell's 1999 album Kimosabe.

In the early 2000s, Curran joined Anthem Records as an artists and repertoire manager. He cowrote two more songs for Mitchell's 2007 album Ain't Life Amazing, and participated in the recording of Coney Hatch's 2013 reunion album Four and selected reunion concerts.

In 2021, he appeared on two tracks by Alex Lifeson, released on Lifeson's website. Curran and Lifeson have a new band, Envy of None, with vocalist Maiah Wynne.
