= Maiah Wynne =

American singer-songwriter

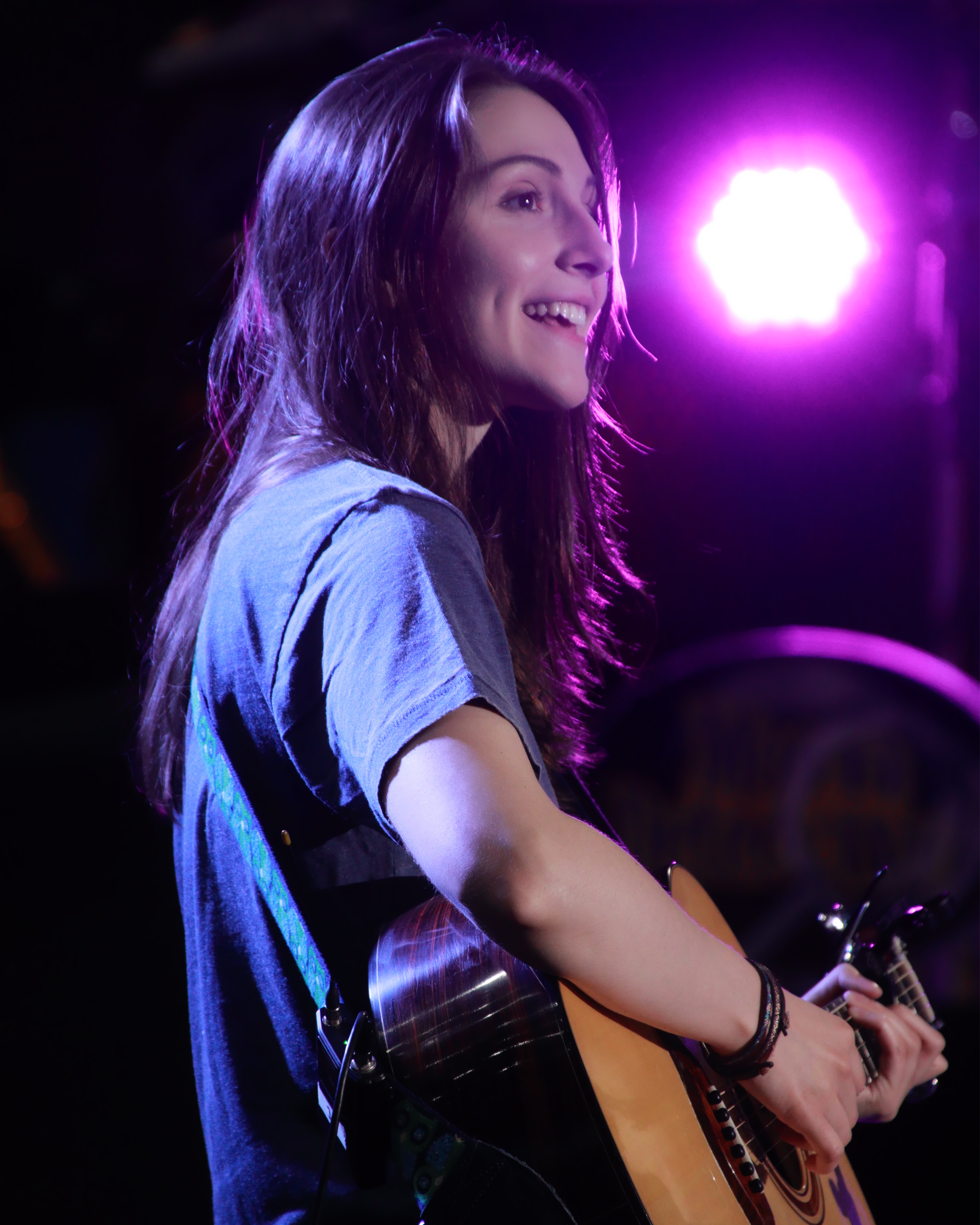

Background information
- Born: December 22, 1996 (age 29)
- Genres: Folk rock, indie folk
- Occupations: Singer, musician, songwriter
- Instruments: Vocals, guitar, piano, keyboards, percussion
- Years active: 2013–present
- Label: Kscope
- Member of: Envy of None
- Website: maiahwynne.com

Maiah Wynne (born December 22, 1996) is an American singer-songwriter based in Gresham, Oregon. She is currently the lead singer in Envy of None, a project including Rush guitarist Alex Lifeson.

== Life and career ==
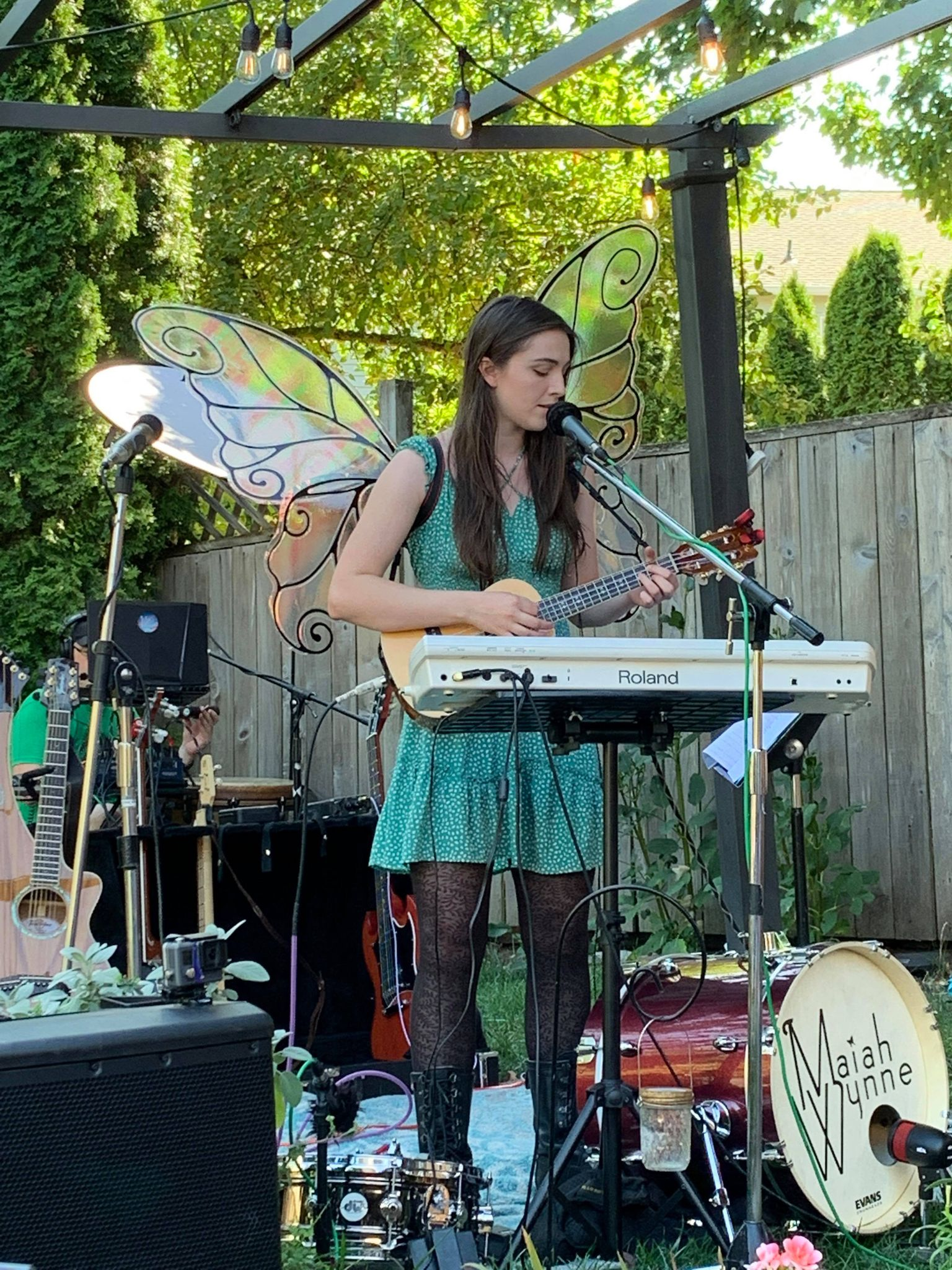
Maiah Wynne at Blue Heron

Maiah Wynne was born in Colorado and moved to Spokane, Washington when she was young. Wynne composed her first song at the age of seven. She spent her high school years in Missoula, Montana, where she started taking part in music competitions. After winning a few of them, Wynne earned slots at the Upstream Music Fest, Timber Music Festival, Northwest Folklife and the KEXP public radio station. Her acting career brought her an invitation to perform at the Sundance Music Festival. In 2017, she wrote and performed "The Ballad of Lefty Brown," a song featured in the end credits of the movie with the same name. In 2019, she won the International Music from the Moon songwriting contest and performed for the Apollo 11's 50th anniversary homecoming dinner at the U.S. Space & Rocket Center. She was also featured in NPR's 2019 Tiny Desk Contest as the first entry and toured as a featured artist with the Portland Cello Project. She collaborated with Portland Cello Project and Alex Lifeson of Rush for her song, "Fearless Girl."

Wynne, Lifeson, and Canadian singer Andy Curran worked together on a four-track EP, tentatively titled Middle of Nowhere. In 2021, Wynne, Curran and Lifeson's EP was revealed as the album Envy of None; this project also includes guitarist Alfio Annibalini, with additional musical contributions coming from drummers Tim Oxford (Arkells) and David Quinton Steinberg (Dead Boys, the Mods).

== Influences ==
Wynne mentions Florence and the Machine, Radiohead, the Beatles and Norah Jones as some of her main musical influences.

== Discography ==
=== Albums ===
- Light & Shadows – EP (2017)
- Wings – EP (2017)
- Songs from Lucy Gray Baird – EP (2020)
- Songs from Lucy Gray Baird Volume 2 – EP (2020)
- Songs from Lucy Gray Baird Volume 3 – EP (2021)
- Acoustic Holiday – EP (2021)
- Songs from Lucy Gray Baird Volume 4 (2022)
- Out of the Dark (2024)
- Into the Waves (2026)

=== Singles ===
- "Haunted Song"
- "A Siren's Song"
- "The Ballad of Lefty Brown" from the movie The Ballad of Lefty Brown
- "Fearless Girl – Live"
- "Sleep"
- "A Chance to Say Goodbye"
- "Open Up My Eyes"
- "My Strange Addiction – Live" (with Dreadlight)
- "Fearless Girl" (With The Portland Cello Project)
- "A Chance to Say Goodbye (Remix)" (With Just Jamez & J. 5cott)
- "Show the World"
- "Lift"

=== Other Collaborations ===
- "The Wolf" (With J. 5cott)
- "Ballad of the Wind Fish" (With Glasys)
- "Devil in Disguise" for the Missoula to Memphis Album
- "Trap of Love" (with Dreadlight)
- "Hex Girl" (with Dreadlight)
- "Ghost Light" (with Skyhill)
- "From Dust" (with Skyhill)
- "Out in the Moonlight" (with Skyhill)
- “Teardrop” (with Dan Avidan and Super Guitar Brothers)
- "Another Step" (with Dan Avidan and Alex Lifeson)

=== As part of Envy of None ===
- "Never Said I Love You"
- "Shadow"
- "Look Inside"
- "Liar"
- "Spy House"
- "Dog's Life"
- "Kabul Blues"
- "Old Strings"
- "Dumb"
- "Enemy"
- "Western Sunset"
- "Lethe River"
- "You'll Be Sorry"
- "That Was Then"
