= Bruce Gordon (musician) =

Canadian musician (born 1968 in London)

Bruce Gordon (born 1968 in London, England) is an English-born Canadian rock musician, best known as the former bassist for I Mother Earth.

He was born to parents of Scottish and German heritage. He immigrated to Canada with his family at the age of six. They first moved to Edmonton, Alberta but after only a year relocated to Oakville, Ontario, a suburb of Toronto.

His exposure to bands such as the Dead Kennedys, Black Flag and Bad Brains inspired him to pick up the bass guitar at the age of fifteen. He quickly took to the instrument and within a few months had joined a Toronto punk band called Intensive Chaos. Primarily self-taught, Gordon continued to play in a string of basement bands and soon graduated to the independent scene where he started playing local gigs with Jonathan Cummins (Bionic, Doughboys), and Cam and Brad Maclean in Circus Lupus.

After finishing high school, Gordon enrolled in the jazz program at Humber College to further his musical knowledge. Around the same time the demise of Circus Lupus led him to join the newly formed Rocktopus. Rocktopus released several independent cassettes and an EP on Lone Wolf Records. The band toured regularly across Ontario and Quebec and successfully completed two cross Canada and one North American tour before finally calling it quits.

In 1993, only one month after Rocktopus split, Gordon joined I Mother Earth, who had already signed a worldwide deal with Capitol records. A few short weeks after he joined the band, they embarked on a pre-album release tour across the United States. Gordon was credited with bass duty on 1993's Dig, though he did not actually record it. However, he did record on 1996's Scenery and Fish, 1999's Blue Green Orange, and 2003's The Quicksilver Meat Dream.

In 2003, the band parted ways to pursue different projects. Gordon expanded his teaching practice, both privately and at the Twelfth Fret, and began to explore new musical endeavors. He tried his hand at as many different musical styles as possible, including various jazz and blues artists, and for a year worked with songwriter Alison Maclean in her band Fourstar. He also performed with the funk improv band Hot Fo' Gandhi and the lo-fi jazz combo the Tiny Specks.

In early 2005, Gordon was hired by Blue Man Group to help open up a new Toronto-based show. He continues to perform with the eclectic ensemble on a variety of instruments that include electric zither, chapman stick and talking drum.

Gordon joined with fellow Blue Man musicians Dave Steele and Steve Ballstadt to form the instrumental spy-go-go-surf-noir trio Experiment In Terror. His newest project is the live electro groove collective called Ostrich.

Gordon now lives in Florida, where he continues to work for Blue Man Group. In 2012, he reunited with the rest of the most recent I Mother Earth lineup for several live performances across Canada. They have also recorded a new song.
