= Clarknova =

Canadian alternative rock band

- Origin: Newmarket, Ontario, Canada
- Genres: Alternative rock; industrial rock
- Years active: 1998–2003; 2010
- Labels: Resort Records; Shoreline Records; EMI Music Canada
- Members: Steve Kulba; John "Lordie" Lord; Chris "Sheckie" Ferguson; Greg "Dirty" Caines; Scott "Ripper" Wilson; Dan Preston; Pat Davies

Clarknova was a 5-piece alternative rock band from Newmarket, Canada. The group originally formed in the early 1990s under the name Tribal Stomp, and released 2 records, one entitled Blue and a second, self-titled album, Tribal Stomp. This record had 2 singles, "Breathe" and "Stain", with videos for each that received play on Canada's MuchMusic. In 1998, drummer Shayne Wakefield and bassist Dave Alexander left the group and were replaced by John Lord and Chris Ferguson. With this lineup change their sound evolved, causing the band to take a new direction and a new name, Clarknova.

== History ==
In 1999, Clarknova released their first LP entitled Host. It was produced by Paul Northfield and Brad Nelson, and recorded at Great Big Music in Toronto, Le Studio Morin Heights in Quebec, and at Newmarket Multimedia. The album included a re-make of their previous single "Stain" retitled "Re-Stain," with additional production by Mike Kerwin and was the only Tribal Stomp track that remained in Clarknova's setlist. The album was well received in the Toronto area, due to extensive self-promotion at concerts by the band. This in turn, caused 102.1 The Edge in Toronto to be overwhelmed with requests from fans to play the single "Johnny Under," causing the song to be inserted into high rotation. The band toured regularly throughout this time acquiring a growing fanbase.

In 2002, the band recorded their follow-up album Annexia with Jagori Tanna from I Mother Earth as producer. Plans were set to release the disc, when guitarist Scott Wilson left the band for personal reasons. Later, while touring the record, the band lost their second guitarist, Greg Caines, to similar circumstances. Scott was soon replaced by Dan Preston, who had performed engineering duties on both Clarknova records, and played guitar on the track "Exile At Home," and Greg was replaced by Pat Davies. The first single "Drown," followed by "Please Them," the video for which was played regularly on MuchLOUD. The band also released a third single entitled "Start Again (Velocity)." In 2003, after a nationwide tour with I Mother Earth and Scratching Post, the band broke up.

The names Clarknova and Annexia are taken from William S. Burroughs' novel Naked Lunch.

The original line up of Kulba, Wilson, Caines, Ferguson and Lord reunited after seven years to perform one show only in Newmarket on December 18, 2010, as a part of York Aid at Glenway Country Club. A guest appearance from Dan Preston, who was in version 2.0, joined the band for the last song of the night "Johnny Under".

== Discography ==
=== As Tribal Stomp ===
- Blue (1996)
- Tribal Stomp (1998)

=== Albums ===
- Host (1999)
- Annexia (2002)

== See also ==
- 4 Barrel
