= Brian Byrne =

Canadian singer and songwriter (born 1975)

- Born: January 13, 1975 (age 51); Steady Brook, Newfoundland and Labrador, Canada
- Genres: Alternative rock, country rock
- Occupations: Singer, songwriter, musician
- Instruments: Guitar, vocals
- Years active: 1997–present
- Labels: Kindling, Blacktop
- Website: brianbyrnemusic.com

Brian Byrne (born January 13, 1975) is a Canadian singer and songwriter. He was the second vocalist for the band I Mother Earth.

== Biography ==
Brian joined his first band in Corner Brook in 1988, a hair-metal band called Pandemonium. The band also featured John Kennedy, Rick Waterman, Todd Cook, and the late Kris Waterman, who selected the 13-year-old Byrne as the lead singer for the band.

Byrne lived in Steady Brook and Toronto in the early 1990s, where he worked at different times as cook, dishwasher, bartender, night cleaner, office worker, ski instructor, and rock climbing instructor. He fronted bands such as Mess and Klaven (the latter with Adam Gontier of Three Days Grace) before eventually joining rock band I Mother Earth in 1997. He recorded two albums with them, Blue Green Orange (1999) and The Quicksilver Meat Dream (2003).

His solo debut, Tuesdays, Thursdays and if it Rains, was released on April 11, 2006. In support of the album he toured Canada, playing both acoustic solo sets and with a full backing band. In November 2006, Byrne opened for INXS on their Canadian dates.

Byrne appeared in an Ontario Travel tourism television commercial that debuted in March 2007; he sings the song "There's No Place Like This" to images of people in Ontario enjoying themselves across the province.

Byrne released his second solo album, Tailor Made, on September 4, 2007. His touring band consisted of Bob Egan (Blue Rodeo, Wilco), Christian Tanna (I Mother Earth), Gerry Finn (David Usher), and Justin Mahoney.

In September 2007, the band played a CCMA showcase in Regina, Saskatchewan, and later toured Eastern Canada, doing shows with The Divorcees and as the supporting act for Corb Lund.

Byrne is currently on Blacktop Records with a three-song EP titled Boots and Blood, a preview for his third full-length solo album.

As of May 2011, Brian is currently a tattoo artist at Bonded Ink in North Sydney, Nova Scotia, Canada. He later relocated to Peterborough, Ontario.

On January 24, 2012, I Mother Earth announced an end to its hiatus. The group is producing new music with Byrne again on lead vocals. They have played a number of live shows at venues across Canada. Byrne also continues to perform as a solo act.

With his wife Tara, in 2012, founded OCD Collective to raise money for families to cover autism and mental health needs.

In 2015, Byrne began work as a radio announcer with Live 105, Halifax, Nova Scotia.

In early 2016, Byrne announced he was trying out to become Stone Temple Pilots' new vocalist.

== Discography ==
=== I Mother Earth ===
- Blue Green Orange (1999, Mercury/Universal)
- The Quicksilver Meat Dream (2003, Universal)

=== Solo albums ===
- Tuesdays, Thursdays and if it Rains (2006, Kindling/Warner)
- Tailor Made (2007, Kindling/Warner)

=== Singles ===
- "Far From Good" – 2006
- "Oscar Thomas Finn" – 2006
- "Crazy" – 2007
- "Boots And Blood EP" – 2010
- "Arizona" – 2014
