= Edwin (musician) =

Canadian musician

Background information
- Born: Edwin Ghazal
- Origin: Toronto, Ontario, Canada
- Genres: Alternative, acoustic, pop
- Occupation: Musician
- Instruments: Vocals, guitar
- Years active: 1990–present
- Labels: Linus Entertainment, Universal Music Canada

Edwin Ghazal, known as Edwin is a Canadian alternative rock singer from Toronto. He is the lead vocalist for the Canadian rock band I Mother Earth as well as a solo artist and the lead singer for the Canadian supergroup Crash Karma. In 2016, he reunited with I Mother Earth for a series of shows and a tour commemorating the 20th anniversary of their most commercially successful album, Scenery and Fish.

== Early life ==
Edwin Ghazal was born in Toronto to Lebanese parents Moses and Marie Ghazal. He had a brother who was a doctor.

== I Mother Earth ==
Edwin was the lead vocalist for I Mother Earth from 1990 to 1997. He performed on the band's first two albums, Dig and Scenery and Fish. He also performed on the majority of the songs on Victor, a 1996 side project with Alex Lifeson of Rush. He left IME in 1997. On March 1, 2016, it was announced on IME's website that the band would reunite with Edwin for a series of shows, performing the band's 1996 sophomore release Scenery and Fish in its entirety to celebrate its 20th anniversary. Edwin has been the lead singer of the band since those reunion shows.

== Solo career ==
After leaving IME in late 1997, Edwin kept a lower profile. He met with members of the recently dissolved Glueleg, most notably Ruben Huizenga. He also met with Sony Music, who signed him in August 1998. That summer, Edwin reappeared as a surprise guest with The Tea Party at Edgefest '98 on July 1 in Barrie, Ontario. Edwin contributed lead vocals in their Canada Day rendition of David Bowie's "I'm Afraid of Americans". Back in Toronto, Huizenga and company brought their instrumental talents to Edwin's debut solo album, as did several other session musicians (including IME percussionist Daniel Mansilla). Producer and ex-BTK member Matt DeMatteo did the bulk of the production (at times assisted by Huizenga) and also played instruments. Huizenga, DeMatteo, David Martin, and half a dozen other songwriters collaborated with Edwin, who claimed to have written 75% of the album. The result was Another Spin Around the Sun, released in Spring 1999.

Edwin began writing and recording songs in a new genre - danceable, singalong pop-rock, complete with loops and samples and a greater emphasis on Edwin's vocals. Initial singles "Trippin'" and "Hang Ten" focused on rock radio and became hits on that format, while third single "And You" was somewhat less successful. The fourth single "Alive" not only revived the album, but it changed its direction. The song appeared on the mainstream Top 40 in Canada. Its video, directed by Rob Heydon, won a Juno Award in 2001 for Best Video and People's Choice Award at MuchMusic's MMVAs. A fifth single, "Rush", was released to capitalize on that success but was met with relatively little fanfare. The album went Platinum in Canada, was nominated for a Juno in 2000 for Best Rock Album, and was released in the U.S. that year.

For the next few months, Edwin was absent from the pop scene, save for a cameo role in the indie film The Art of Woo. He resurfaced in late 2001, having recruited a full-time backup band, named The Pressure. Its members were his previous touring/session bassist Kenny Cunningham and guitarist Ron Bechard, and newcomers Mike K. (guitar) and Sekou Lumumba (drums).

For his next album, Edwin again used session musicians; songwriters played a role as before, and both Huizenga and Martin returned to make a few contributions, but overall the playing, collaboration, and production were dominated by Tawgs Salter, Steven Klasios, and Jeff 'Diesel' Dalziel. Edwin himself played guitar on one track and programmed another, both firsts for him in the studio. The album, titled Edwin & the Pressure, was released in Summer 2002. The album contained the catchy pop-rock of the previous album, but with a harder edge both musically and lyrically. The lead single written by Edwin, Thomas Salter, Jeff Dalziel, Meher Steinberg and Memphis, "Superhoney", was given a lukewarm reception at first by the various rock media, but became a solid rock radio and video hit due to support from the existing fan base. A second single, "Impossible", fared reasonably well on rock radio. The third single, "Let's Dance", backed by a video, failed to receive significant video or radio play. Eventually, due to poor record sales and creative disagreements, Edwin was dropped from Sony at his own request and disappeared yet again.

In 2005, Edwin signed with Linus Universal|Linus Entertainment, at which time he began recording songs for a new release and a return to full solo status. Edwin's third album, Better Days, was released on October 10, 2006, featuring a softer sound and Edwin playing acoustic guitar on many of the tracks. The first single from the album, "Right Here", was well received but received limited radio airplay in major markets nationwide. Despite varying reports on the choice of a second single, one never materialized, and the album was abandoned after a short tour.

== Crash Karma ==
In 2008, Edwin announced that he, Mike Turner (Our Lady Peace) and Jeff Burrows (The Tea Party) planned to record an album together. The band, named Crash Karma, is rounded out by former Zygote bassist and lead singer Amir Epstein. Crash Karma released its debut album, produced by Turner, in March 2010 and released it on E1 Music Canada.

== Edwin and the Pressure ==
Edwin and the Pressure is the second album by the Canadian alternative rock singer Edwin, released by Sony on April 2, 2002, in Canada. Though technically his second solo album, Edwin himself considered it a debut for his then-new band.

The album continued the pop-oriented, electronically flavored style of the previous album, with more heavily guitar-dominated sound and more explicit lyrics than before.

Track listing

1. "Superhoney" – 3:01
2. "The One That Got Away" – 3:28
3. "Impossible" – 3:02
4. "High" – 4:07
5. "Firecracker" – 3:02
6. "Malibu Sunset" – 3:12
7. "Painkiller" – 2:48
8. "Let's Dance" – 3:27
9. "Surround Me" – 3:45
10. "Split The Atom" – 2:59
11. "Close Your Eyes" – 2:50

The Pressure were prominently featured on and inside the album jacket but did not actually play on the album.

== Discography ==
- Another Spin Around the Sun (1999)
- Edwin & the Pressure (2002)
- Better Days (2006)
