= Paul Northfield =

British record producer

Paul Northfield is a prolific British record producer and sound engineer, who has worked on albums by bands such as Dream Theater, Queensrÿche, Rush, Porcupine Tree and Suicidal Tendencies.

Northfield worked at Advision Studio, London from 1974 to 1978, then at Le Studio, Morin Heights, Quebec from 1978 to 1987, and has been an independent engineer since then.

== Selected discography ==
Year	Album title	Band	Record label	Role
1975	Free Hand	Gentle Giant	Chrysalis	Engineer (Assistant)
1976	Interview	Gentle Giant	Chrysalis	Engineer
1977	Makin' Magic	Pat Travers	Polydor	Engineer, Remixing
1980	Permanent Waves	Rush	Anthem/Mercury	Engineer
1981	Exit...Stage Left	Rush	Anthem/Mercury	Engineer, Mixing
1981	Moving Pictures	Rush	Anthem/Mercury	Engineer
1981	Head On	Toronto	Solid Gold Records	Engineer
1982	Power Play	April Wine	Aquarius Records	Engineer
1982	Signals	Rush	Anthem/Mercury	Engineer, Mixing
1983	Alpha	Asia	Geffen	Engineer, Mixing
1984	Animal Grace	April Wine	Aquarius Records	Engineer
1984	Grace Under Pressure	Rush	Anthem/Mercury	Synthesizer, Programming
1986	Shakin' Like A Human Being	Kim Mitchell	Atlantic Records	Engineer
1987	Pop Goes the World	Men Without Hats	Mercury	Producer, Mixing
1988	Operation: Mindcrime	Queensrÿche	EMI	Engineer
1989	A Show of Hands	Rush	Anthem/Mercury	Engineer
1989	No Respect	Vain	Island	Producer, Engineer, Mixing
1990	Then & Now	Asia	Geffen	Engineer
1990	Empire	Queensrÿche	EMI	Engineer
1990	Steelheart	Steelheart	MCA	Engineer, Assistant Engineer, Mixing
1990	Big Houses	Eight Seconds	WEA	Producer
1991	’’Monsters Under The Bed’’	Honeymoon Suite	WEA	Producer
1991	Hey Stoopid	Alice Cooper	Epic	Engineer
1992	The Art of Rebellion	Suicidal Tendencies	Epic	Engineer, Mixing
1993	Sarsippius' Ark	Infectious Grooves	Epic	Producer, Mixing
1993	Cockroach	Danger Danger	Epic	Engineer, Mixing
1994	Groove Family Cyco	Infectious Grooves	Epic	Mixing
1994	Suicidal for Life	Suicidal Tendencies	Epic	Producer, Engineer, Mixing
1995	Helpyourselfish	D-A-D	Medley/EMI	Producer
1995	Ozzmosis	Ozzy Osbourne	Epic	Engineer
1996	Scenery and Fish	I Mother Earth	EMI	Producer, Engineer, Mixing
1996	Creature	Moist	EMI	Producer
1997	Black Science	GZR	TVT	Producer, Mixing
1997	Friends & Family	Suicidal Tendencies	Suicidal	Mixing
1997	Prime Cuts	Suicidal Tendencies	Epic	Producer, Mixing
1998	Celebrity Skin	Hole	Geffen	Engineer
1998	Different Stages	Rush	Anthem/Atlantic	Producer, Mixing
1998	Little Songs	David Usher	EMI	Producer
1998	Six the Hard Way	Suicidal Tendencies	Suicidal	Producer, Mixing
1999	Freedumb	Suicidal Tendencies	Suicidal/SideOneDummy	Producer, Engineer, Mixing
1999	Blue Green Orange	I Mother Earth	Mercury	Co-producer
2000	Holy Wood (In the Shadow of the Valley of Death)	Marilyn Manson	Nothing/Interscope	Engineer
2000	Free Your Soul and Save My Mind	Suicidal Tendencies	Suicidal	Mixing
2000	Host	Clarknova	Shoreline/EMI	Producer/Mixing
2001	Since August	Since August	Loggerhead/Universal	Producer, Engineer
2002	Vapor Trails	Rush	Anthem/Atlantic	Producer, Engineer
2002	In Absentia	Porcupine Tree	Lava	Engineer
2003	The Spirit of Radio: Greatest Hits 1974-1987	Rush	Mercury	Engineer, Synthesizer Programming
2005	Four Play	Pat Travers	Majestic Rock	Engineer
2006	The Dark Third	Pure Reason Revolution	InsideOut	Engineer
2007	Systematic Chaos	Dream Theater	Roadrunner	Engineer, Mixing
2009	Black Clouds & Silver Linings	Dream Theater	Roadrunner	Engineer, Mixing
2010	Killing Mars	Mosquito-B	Bulldog Brothers	Co-Producer, Mixer, Engineer
2011	Hell Bound Gypsy Train	Stone Mary	Independent	Producer, Mixer, Engineer
2011	A Dramatic Turn of Events	Dream Theater	Roadrunner	Engineer
2013	13	Suicidal Tendencies	Suicidal	Producer
2014	Glory Under Dangerous Skies	Moist	Universal Music Group	Producer
2016	Use Less U	Mosquito-B	The Trench Records	Co-Producer, Mixer, Engineer
2016	World Gone Mad	Suicidal Tendencies	Suicidal	Producer
