= Christian Tanna =

Canadian alternative rock musician

Christian Tanna is a Canadian drummer and music event organizer based in Peterborough, Ontario. He is best known for being a co-founding member and drummer for the band I Mother Earth.

== Early life ==
Tanna was born Christian Koshowski in Hamilton, Ontario. His family moved to Peterborough when he was in elementary school. Tanna began playing drums in high school.

== Career ==
Tanna, along with his brother, Jagori Tanna, and vocalist Edwin, formed I Mother Earth in 1990. Tanna played on 1993's Dig; in 1994 the band won a Juno Award for Best Rock Album.

Tanna also drummed on the band's 1996's double platinum album Scenery and Fish, 1999's Blue Green Orange, and 2003's The Quicksilver Meat Dream. He wrote all of I Mother Earth's lyrics.

After I Mother Earth broke up in 2004, Tanna created and organized Blue Sky Revival, an event to support Earth Day, in Toronto on 22 April 2005. He took over management duties for the band dodger, and also worked as a manager at the record label UpperLeftSide Music. Tanna also drummed in ex-I Mother Earth bandmate Brian Byrne's band in 2008.

Tanna worked as the event planner for the Park Playhouse in Cobourg, Ontario. He also drummed for the indie band the Flaming Hoops, and in 2010 became the general manager of The Venue, a concert and events venue in Peterborough, Ontario.

Tanna and the rest of the final I Mother Earth lineup reunited in 2012 to play several live performances at venues across Canada and release a new song. They continued to perform together from time to time, and in 2016 came together with their former lead singer, Edwin, to tour with Our Lady Peace and Finger Eleven. Also that year, Tanna became the event manager for the Oshawa Music Hall.

Tanna continued to tour with I Mother Earth, including a performance in St. John's, Newfoundland in 2018.

In October 2022, Tanna joined Oshawa radio station CKGE-FM as host of Generation Next Radio, its program devoted to new and emerging rock musicians.

From April–May 2023, Tanna did a drum clinic tour across multiple "Long and Mcquade" music stores in British Columbia and Ontario, where he performed songs, shared stories from his career and being on tour, and answered fan questions.

Tanna has been an endorser of Mapex Drums since 2012, and for Scenery and Fish and onwards, primarily used and continues to use (as of 2023), a famous Ludwig Drums "Black Beauty" snare drum for most of I Mother Earth’s material and tours.
