= I Mother Earth =

Canadian rock band

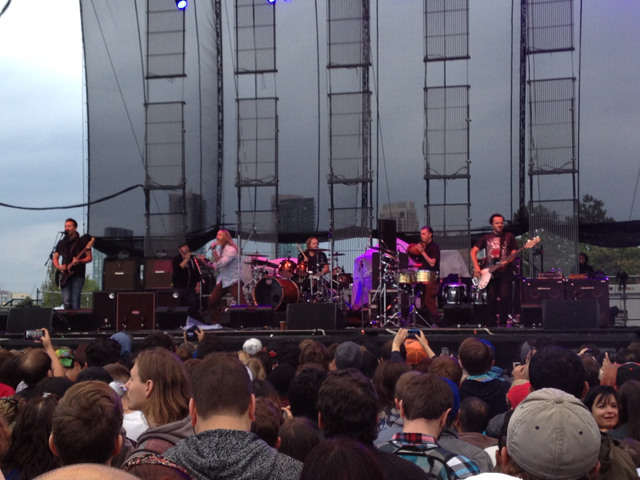
- I Mother Earth performing at Echo Beach in Toronto, August 2014

Background information
- Also known as: IME
- Origin: Toronto, Ontario, Canada
- Genres: Alternative rock; funk rock; progressive rock; hard rock
- Years active: 1990–2003, 2012–present
- Labels: Capitol (US); EMI Music Canada (Canada); Mercury; Universal
- Members: Jagori Tanna; Christian Tanna; Edwin
- Past members: Bruce Gordon; Brian Byrne; Franz Masini

I Mother Earth, or IME, is a Canadian rock band. The band formed in 1990, reaching its peak popularity in the latter half of the 1990s. After an eight-year hiatus, it reunited in 2012. Between 1996 and 2016, they were among the top 150 best-selling Canadian artists and top 40 best-selling Canadian bands in Canada.

== History ==
=== Early years ===
The brother duo of drummer Christian and guitarist Jagori Tanna met vocalist Edwin at their shared rehearsal space in 1990. Edwin asked the brothers to form a band with him, and the three came together in 1991, taking on Franz Masini as a bass player. The band came up with the name IME, as in "I Am Me", but later decided the letters should stand for something. Jag Tanna ad-libbed the name I Mother Earth and has always insisted it has no special meaning. The band, represented by a professionally recorded five-song demo, played a mere thirteen shows over the next year. These were noted for their jam sessions, poetry readings, and murals painted in the background during the songs. At the end of the year, the band was in the middle of a bidding war between labels.

=== Success ===
In 1992, I Mother Earth signed to a co-venture deal brokered between Capitol Records (U.S.) and its Canadian affiliate, EMI Music Canada. The band travelled to Los Angeles in 1992 to record its debut album with former Guns N' Roses producer Mike Clink. During these sessions, Franz Masini was fired, leaving Jag Tanna to re-record the bass parts himself. At the completion of the album, Masini was replaced by Bruce Gordon, whose band Rocktopus was breaking up at that time. With the lineup solidified, the band underwent an intensive international tour to support its debut, Dig, in mid-1993. Considered an anomaly in the "alternative" era and often mistaken for heavy metal, the album combined traditional hard rock with grooves, extended jams, psychedelic lyrics, and the Latin-based percussion of Luis Conte and Armando Borg. Dig spawned four singles, three of which originated from IME's demo tape and were later included on the proper album. "Rain Will Fall", "Not Quite Sonic", and "Levitate" were released in 1993, and "So Gently We Go" was released in the summer of 1994. All four garnered radio and video airplay in Canada, as well as rotations in the U.S. and Europe. The latter two singles in particular charted well on Canadian rock radio. The Dig album won a Juno Award in 1994 for Best Hard Rock Album, beating out IME's childhood idols Rush for the award. This cemented a long relationship between the two bands, which started with IME opening for Rush the night after the Junos. By the end of the album's run, Dig was a Gold record in Canada.

After the exhaustive touring ended, IME ended up in different studios in Toronto and Morin Heights, Quebec in the summer and fall of 1995. In these studios, the band worked on its second album, co-produced by Jag Tanna and Paul Northfield, who was most noted for producing Rush. Daniel Mansilla replaced Borg on percussion, and became the band's permanent touring percussionist. Rush guitarist Alex Lifeson also made a guest appearance on the song "Like a Girl". Signs of dissension in the band were already showing. For the first time, Edwin revealed to the music press that he had no creative input in the band and that such a situation gave him "no reason to be (t)here". He had also spent a great deal of the sessions away from the band, recording the album Victor with Lifeson. Still, he remained with IME as the group recorded Scenery and Fish, released in April 1996. The album, which combined IME's trademark sounds with a slightly softer, radio-friendly approach, was a critical and commercial success. In particular, the singles "One More Astronaut" and "Another Sunday" pushed the band into the commercial elite in Canada, the former cracking the Top 20 on the Billboard Mainstream Rock Chart in the U.S. Subsequent singles "Used to Be Alright" and "Raspberry" also received frequent airplay on radio and video. In 1997, IME was nominated for a Juno Award for Group of the Year. The album was nominated for the Best Rock Album Juno, and was certified Double Platinum in Canada. The band's newfound fame also pushed sales of Dig over the Platinum record mark of 100,000 units.

=== Transition period ===
In April 1997, IME's management company announced that Edwin would be leaving the band. From that point on, the band mentioned that Jag Tanna wrote the majority of its music (during jams with his brother and Gordon), that Chris Tanna wrote all of the lyrics, and that Edwin had no input whatsoever. This and musical differences prompted the vocalist to leave. Citing unmanageable tension, the band and Edwin mutually agreed to part ways. The remaining members insisted that they would carry on under the I Mother Earth name, and announced they would be searching for a new lead singer. IME also publicly criticized a show by Franz Masini's new band, which was advertised as "featuring members of I Mother Earth", as a blow to its own name and image. Edwin fulfilled all his contractual obligations with the band, including the Edgefest '97 tour, and left in mid-1997. IME itself ended up in disputes with both EMI and the band's management (Capitol had inexplicably dropped the band prior), and subsequently broke ties with both after their recording contract expired in December 1996.

During this time, the band went through hundreds of demo tapes, all the while maintaining the tour schedule and dealing with the aforementioned business issues. One tape, sent in by Brian Byrne, was instantly thrown in the trash, until former Slik Toxik drummer Neal Busby, who was briefly in a band called Klaven with Byrne, recommended the singer. IME finally listened to the tape, and after auditioning Byrne, immediately agreed that he was their new vocalist. The band members waited several months to inform him before finally putting an I Mother Earth T-shirt on him in late 1997, symbolizing his membership in the band. David Usher made the news public, telling the audience at a Moist concert at Massey Hall in November of that year that Byrne was the new singer and then introducing him on stage. IME made its first public performances with Byrne on Our Lady Peace's Summersault tour in mid-1998, and was well received by the crowds through both old and new material.

=== Byrne years ===
In August 1998, IME signed with Mercury Records. Then, in November 1998, the band reunited with Paul Northfield, who again shared production duties with Jag Tanna on the new sessions, recording both in Toronto and Morin Heights. These sessions were chronicled on the internet by Bruce Gordon, lasting from November 1998 - March 1999, long considered the most fan-friendly member of the band (Gordon was known to answer fan emails dating back to the Scenery and Fish years). Armando Borg returned in the place of Conte on percussion, though Mansilla remained IME's main percussionist. Rush frontman Geddy Lee was also brought in to provide bass for the album track "Good for Sule". While the Tannas were still the main contributors, they described the creative process as more open than before. The result was Blue Green Orange, which was released in July 1999. It was somewhat of a departure from the band's earlier work, opting for more textured, spacier sounds and less of an emphasis on the band's hard-rock reputation. The album's lead single, "Summertime in the Void", was a hit on rock radio in Canada with the track's video had multiple air plays on Much Music throughout the summer of 1999 and showed that the band was still commercially viable with a different singer and a change in sound. Subsequent singles "All Awake" and "When Did You Get Back from Mars?" also received radio and video airplay. The album was certified Gold in Canada, but was seen as a disappointment by many compared to the previous albums. Tanna and Northfield won a Juno Award in 2000 for "Best Recording Engineer", and the album was nominated for "Best Album Design".

IME came off the road and in 2001 the band members settled into their own Toronto studio, the Mother's Hip. This period was plagued with problems. Brian Byrne had ruptured his vocal cords and required surgery. Christian Tanna broke his forearm and was unable to play drums. After those injuries healed the band decided to scrap the entire session, which was reportedly filled with radio-friendly material, and start from the beginning. This occurred after a false story circulated in the media that the album was finished and tentatively titled Save the Last Disco. Furthermore, the band also dealt with the EMI release of Earth, Sky, and Everything in Between, an album of B-Sides and live recordings from the EMI years. The Tannas and Gordon issued a statement insisting the record was unauthorized and was nothing more than a cash grab by EMI. Edwin offered no comment on the album.

IME then went to work on the proper new album in 2002 with producer David Bottrill (alongside Jag Tanna), taking only a short break to headline the "Canadian MTV Campus Invasion Tour", then releasing a song as a preview of the new material. The song "Juicy" was pressed as a promo single for the Vin Diesel movie xXx, and despite no push from the label and no video, it received rock radio airplay on its own. It was later included on The Quicksilver Meat Dream, released in early 2003. The album was an even larger departure from past works, with industrial elements replacing the Latin percussion (but not Mansilla, who still toured with the band), and a heavier, more progressive sound than ever before. Universal was unimpressed with the nearly finished product and demanded radio-friendly singles, so IME returned to the studio to appease it. Lead single "Like the Sun" was another Canadian rock hit, but despite its popularity, it failed to sell the record. Due to the dismal sales and arguments with the Tannas over the direction of IME, Universal withdrew all support from the band, leaving it to fund small tours and second single "No Coma" on its own. The song failed to be officially added to rock radio, the video received very limited play, and the band decided to end the album's run after only seven months. The band provided the theme songs for the MuchMusic TV shows Much on Demand and MuchLOUD, but otherwise went unheard in the media for the rest of the year. Universal officially dropped IME at the end of 2003. In November 2003, I Mother Earth performed a special show in Barrie, Ontario, entitled "Live off the Floor". Largely considered by those present as their greatest live performance, the intimate, nearly four-hour show featured the band performing in the round of the Georgian College venue, with the crowd on all sides. IME played most of its back catalogue at the show, and it was thought to be the band's final performance.

=== Hiatus ===
During the band's hiatus, Brian Byrne started a solo career, releasing two albums and one EP. Bruce Gordon joined the Blue Man Group lineup and pursued numerous side projects. Jagori Tanna founded a new studio and record label, UpperLeftSide music, as well as the production company Segment X Productions. Christian Tanna organized local Toronto rock and jazz events, and was in management roles with both UpperLeftSide music and The Venue, a concert-oriented nightclub in Peterborough, Ontario.

=== Reunion ===
In January 2012, Byrne began winding down his solo work, and plans were made to revive I Mother Earth, with members from Byrne's time with the band. During this period, the Tanna brothers and Byrne lived in Peterborough, Ontario, while Gordon continued to work full-time with the Blue Man Group production in Orlando, Florida.

On January 24, 2012, the band's hiatus ended with a concert announcement and blog post on their official website.

On March 21, 2012, the band released the track "We Got the Love" via SoundCloud before making it available for purchase as a digital download a week later. It was officially serviced and added to Canadian rock radio shortly thereafter.

On March 22, the band made its first appearance onstage together in more than eight years, when it performed a two-and-a-half hour set at the Sound Academy in Toronto. The following night, the band played an even longer set at the same venue. Both nights were sold out. The band then announced summer festival appearances in Ontario. They also headlined George Street in St. John's, Newfoundland on Canada Day, and performed a number of shows supporting Nickelback. In his blog, Jag Tanna also talked about working with Byrne to develop an intimate and interactive show where the band's songs are deconstructed and then presented in different ways.

On July 25, 2012, Jag Tanna announced in a blog posting that bassist Bruce Gordon wouldn't be a part of some upcoming shows, due to other professional and personal commitments. Chuck Dailey, bass player with the band The Salads, was enlisted as what Tanna described as "the understudy." Dailey had assisted the band during rehearsals. Gordon provided him with iPhone video of some of the more difficult I Mother Earth bass parts to help him learn the material. Dailey made his live debut with the band on the same day, during a performance at Empire Rockfest in Belleville, Ontario. He continued to perform with the band as a touring member. Bruce Gordon has not been contacted for shows since 2013.

On October 5, 2012, the band appeared during Kitchener's Oktoberfest. The band participated in Rocktoberfest, a series of events that also featured guitar legend David Wilcox.

In early 2013, the band started to play shows with a new intimate and interactive concept titled "A Very Long Evening with I Mother Earth". The first set, open to VIP ticket holders, was a combination of question and answer mixed with acoustic or deconstructed versions of five or six songs. The second set, open to general admission, was a three-hour electric set featuring fan favourites and extended jams.

In 2015, the band released two new singles, "The Devil's Engine" and "Blossom", both of which received rock radio airplay in Canada.

=== Byrne's departure, reunion with Edwin ===
In February 2016, it was reported that Byrne, who had a radio gig at Halifax's Live 105 FM, was also trying out to be the new vocalist for Stone Temple Pilots. Jagori Tanna revealed in a 2018 interview that the band had a tour planned with Byrne when he "disappeared" and the Tanna brothers never heard from him.

On March 1, 2016, the band announced that it would reunite with Edwin to celebrate the 20th anniversary of the band's 1996 album Scenery and Fish. The band performed two sold-out shows at the Phoenix Concert Theatre in Toronto on June 3 and 4, 2016, in which the band played the album Scenery and Fish in its entirety. The band has since continued to tour with Edwin and have stated plans to release new songs in the future.

On November 30, 2021, the band announced two shows in 2022 which would feature both Edwin and Byrne performing vocals. The band performed the shows on April 29 and 30 in Ottawa and Toronto, respectively.

On August 1, 2023, the band announced that original percussionist Armando Borg had died.

== Band members ==
Current

- Jagori Tanna – guitar (1990–2003, 2012–present)
- Christian Tanna – drums (1990–2003, 2012–present)
- Edwin – lead vocals (1990–1997, 2016–present)

Former

- Brian Byrne – lead vocals (1997–2003, 2012–2015, 2022)
- Bruce Gordon – bass (1992–2003, 2012)
- Franz Masini – bass (1990–1992)

Touring

- Daniel Mansilla – percussion (1996–present)
- Chris Collins – keyboards (2012–2015)
- Chuck Dailey – bass (2012–2022)
- Joe Barlow – bass (2022–2023)
- Rico "The King" Browne – bass (2023–present)
- Jesse Karwat – keyboards, percussion (2016–present)

== Discography ==
=== Albums ===
Year	Title	Peak chart positions	Certifications	Sales
Year	Title	CAN	CAN	
1993	Dig	-	Platinum	120,000+ (CAN); 100,000+ (US)
1996	Scenery and Fish	10	2× Platinum	320,000+ (CAN)
1999	Blue Green Orange	8	Gold	
2003	The Quicksilver Meat Dream	20		

=== Compilation albums ===
Year	Title	Peak positions	Certifications
2001	Earth, Sky, and Everything in Between	-	

=== Singles ===
Year	Title	Peak chart position						Album
Year	Title	CAN	CAN Alt	CAN Rock	CAN Content (Cancon)	U.S. Main. Rock	U.S. Rock	Album
1993	"Rain Will Fall"	—	×		3	—	—	Dig
1993	"Not Quite Sonic"	—	×		—	—	42	Dig
1993	"Levitate"	—	×		8	—	—	Dig
1994	"So Gently We Go"	43	×		1	—	43	Dig
1995	"Levitate" (re-release)	75	×		×	—	—	Dig
1996	"One More Astronaut"	32	1		×	19	31	Scenery and Fish
1996	"Another Sunday"	—	2		×	—	—	Scenery and Fish
1997	"Used to Be Alright"	67	—		×	—	—	Scenery and Fish
1997	"Raspberry"	14	—		×	—	—	Scenery and Fish
1999	"Summertime in the Void"	—	5		×	—	—	Blue Green Orange
1999	"All Awake"	—	22		×	—	—	Blue Green Orange
2000	"When Did You Get Back from Mars?"	—	12		×	—	—	Blue Green Orange
2002	"Juicy"	—	×	×	×	—	—	The Quicksilver Meat Dream
2003	"Like the Sun"	—	×	×	×	—	—	The Quicksilver Meat Dream
2003	"No Coma"	—	×	×	×	—	—	The Quicksilver Meat Dream
2012	"We Got the Love"	—	8	6	×	—	×	Non-album Single
2015	"The Devil's Engine"	—	—	9	×	—	×	Non-album Single
2015	"Blossom"	—	—	13	×	—	×	Non-album Single
"—" denotes releases that did not chart. "×" denotes periods where charts did not exist or were not archived.

== See also ==
- Canadian rock
- Music of Canada
