= Jagori Tanna =

Canadian musician

Jagori Tanna (born Jagori Andrew Koshowski, in Hamilton, Ontario) is a Canadian musician. Together with his brother, Christian Tanna, he formed I Mother Earth around 1990. He wrote all of I Mother Earth's music, and produced most of it as well. He won a Juno Award in 2000 for Best Recording Engineer (with Paul Northfield) for the band's singles "Summertime in the Void" and "When Did You Get Back From Mars?".

Tanna produced music for bands such as Clarknova and dodger at 'The Mother's Hip' in Toronto, and he owns the record label UpperLeftSide Music, now based out of Peterborough, Ontario. He has also co-produced Sarah Slean's album The Baroness and her recent EP The Baroness Redecorates. His latest projects are the production of his own IFC Canada show, The Rawside Of... and INXS singer J. D. Fortune's solo album, The Death of a Motivational Speaker. In early 2010, he made several comments via his personal Facebook page that he is working on new I Mother Earth material.

On January 24, 2012, Tanna announced via the band's official website that the most recent lineup would reunite for two live performances in Toronto. They have gone on to play additional shows and have released a new song.
