= List of events at the Jacksonville Coliseum =

This is an incomplete list of entertainment acts who appeared at the Jacksonville Veterans Memorial Coliseum from 1960 through 2003.

List of events held at the Coliseum
Artist	Event	Date	Opening Act(s)
AC/DC	Powerage Tour	August 12, 1978	Cheap Trick & Molly Hatchet
AC/DC	Highway to Hell Tour	October 5, 1979	Blackfoot & Mother's Finest
AC/DC	Back in Black Tour	August 24, 1980	Humble Pie & Nantucket
AC/DC	Fly on the Wall Tour	November 7, 1985	Yngwie Malmsteen
AC/DC	Blow Up Your Video World Tour	August 13, 1988	White Lion
AC/DC	Razors Edge World Tour	February 19, 1991	King's X
AC/DC	Ballbreaker World Tour	August 31, 1996	The Poor
Aerosmith	Rocks Tour	May 14, 1976	
Aerosmith	Aerosmith Express Tour	May 14, 1978	Mahogany Rush
Aerosmith	Rock in a Hard Place Tour	December 17, 1982	
Aerosmith	Done with Mirrors Tour	March 30, 1986	Ted Nugent
Aerosmith	Permanent Vacation Tour	April 16, 1988	White Lion
Aerosmith	Pump Tour	April 17, 1990	Joan Jett & The Blackhearts & Skid Row
Aerosmith	Get a Grip Tour	February 12, 1994	Brother Cane
Aerosmith	Nine Lives Tour	November 22, 1997	Talk Show
Alabama	Mountain Music Tour	November 9, 1982	Mickey Gilley & Johnny Lee
Alabama	40-Hour Week Tour	February 22, 1985	Bill Medley
Alice Cooper	Killer Tour	May 24, 1972	Todd Rundgren & The Hello People, Dr John Night Tripper
Alice Cooper	Billion Dollar Babies Tour	April 22, 1973	Flo & Eddie
Alice Cooper	From the Inside Tour	July 9, 1978	Sweet
Alice Cooper	Flush the Fashion Tour	July 17, 1980	
Anita Baker	Compositions World Tour	October 11, 1990	Perri "Pebbles" Reid
Backstreet Boys	Backstreet's Back Tour	July 9, 1998	Aaron Carter
Bad Company	Run with the Pack Tour	March 27, 1976	Kansas
Bad Company	Holy Water Tour	September 18, 1991	Damn Yankees
Barry Manilow	If I Should Love Again Tour	November 13, 1981	
Barry Manilow	Here Comes the Night Tour	November 21, 1982	
Barry Manilow	Manilow Tour	August 28, 1985	
The Beach Boys	Summer Days (And Summer Nights!!) Tour	July 24, 1965 (2 shows)	The Searchers & The Zombies
The Beach Boys	Wild Honey Tour	April 12, 1968	Strawberry Alarm Clock & Buffalo Springfield
The Beach Boys	1975 Tour	November 29, 1975	Outlaws
The Beach Boys	M.I.U. Album Tour	September 4, 1978	Jan & Dean
The Beach Boys	1984 Tour	April 21, 1984	Mick Fleetwood's Zoo
The Beach Boys	1988 Tour	October 6, 1988	
Beastie Boys	Licensed to Ill Tour	February 27, 1987	Public Enemy
Beastie Boys	Together Forever Tour	August 9, 1987	Run–D.M.C. & Davy D
Bee Gees	Spirits Having Flown Tour	October 4, 1979	Sweet Inspirations
Billy Joel	The Bridge Tour	March 24, 1987	
Billy Ray Cyrus	Some Gave All Tour	September 1, 1992	
Billy Ray Cyrus	Some Gave All Tour	May 14, 1993	
Billy Ray Cyrus	It Won't Be the Last Tour	March 14, 1994	
Black Sabbath	Master of Reality Tour	March 3, 1972	Wild Turkey
Black Sabbath	Sabbath Bloody Sabbath Tour	February 16, 1974	Bedlam
Black Sabbath	Never Say Die! Tour	November 4, 1978	Van Halen
Black Sabbath	Heaven & Hell Tour	September 6, 1980	Riot
Black Sabbath	Mob Rules Tour	February 19, 1982	Doc Holliday
Black Sabbath	Born Again Tour	February 14, 1984	Night Ranger
Blackfoot	Marauder Tour	September 19, 1981	Johnny Van Zant Band
Blue Öyster Cult	Agents of Fortune Tour	March 6, 1977	Atlanta Rhythm Section & Rick Derringer
Blue Öyster Cult	Spectres Tour	April 15, 1978	Angel
Blue Öyster Cult	Mirrors Tour	September 1, 1979	Ian Hunter Band
Blue Öyster Cult	The Revölution by Night Tour	March 16, 1984	Aldo Nova
Bob Dylan	1966 World Tour	March 5, 1966	
Bob Dylan	1978 World Tour	December 13, 1978	
Bob Dylan	2002 Never Ending Tour	February 5, 2002	
Bob Segar & the Silver Bullet Band	The Distance Tour	February 21, 1983	John Hall Band
Bob Segar & the Silver Bullet Band	American Storm Tour	November 26, 1986	
Bon Jovi	Slippery When Wet Tour	February 18, 1987	Cinderella
Bon Jovi	New Jersey Syndicate Tour	February 7, 1989	Skid Row
Boston	Boston Tour	April 10, 1977	
Boston	Don't Look Back Tour	January 5, 1979	Sammy Hagar
Bruce Springsteen & the E Street Band	The River Tour	February 18, 1981	
Bruce Springsteen & the E Street Band	The Rising Tour	March 4, 2003	
Bryan Adams	Into the Fire Tour	May 24, 1987	
The Cars	Candy-O Tour	July 2, 1979	
Charley Daniels Band	Windows Tour	May 15, 1982	Jimmy Hall
Cheap Trick	In Color Tour	December 16, 1977	Robin Trower Band
Cheap Trick	Heaven Tonight Tour	May 20, 1979	
Cheap Trick	One on One Tour	August 7, 1982	
Cheap Trick	Standing on the Edge Tour	November 10, 1985	John Waite
Cher	Living Proof: The Farewell Tour	February 14, 2003	
Chicago	Chicago 18 Tour	March 6, 1987	
Clint Black	No Time to Kill Tour	July 14, 1991	
Collin Raye	Tracks Tour	October 18, 2000	
Country Joe and the Fish	1974 Tour	April 12, 1974	
Creedence Clearwater Revival	Cosmo's Factory Tour	August 14, 1970	
Creedence Clearwater Revival	Mardi Gras Tour	April 18, 1972	
Crosby, Stills & Nash	CSN Tour	November 18, 1977	
The Cure	Wish Tour	June 6, 1992	Cranes
The Dave Clark Five	1964 North American Tour	December 11, 1964	
The Dave Clark Five	1965 North American Tour	December 4, 1965	
The Dave Clark Five	1966 North American Tour	July 16, 1966	
David Bowie	Sound+Vision Tour	May 5, 1990	
David Lee Roth	Skyscraper Tour	July 1, 1988	Poison
Deep Purple	Machine Head Tour	March 25, 1972	Buddy Miles Band
Deep Purple	Machine Head Tour	August 27, 1972	Elf
Deep Purple	Who Do We Think We Are Tour	June 15, 1973	ZZ Top & Blue Öyster Cult
Deep Purple	Stormbringer Tour	December 14, 1974	Elf & Electric Light Orchestra
Deep Purple	Perfect Strangers Reunion Tour	March 15, 1985	Girlschool
Def Leppard	Pyromania World Tour	May 21, 1983	Krokus & Jon Butcher Axis
Def Leppard	Hysteria World Tour	December 27, 1987	Tesla
Def Leppard	7-Day Weekend Tour	February 5, 1993	
Diana Ross	Swept Away Tour	November 20, 1984	Honeymoon Suite
Dio	Sacred Heart Tour	October 6, 1985	Rough Cutt
Dio	Dream Evil Tour	January 26, 1988	Megadeth & Savatage
Dixie Chicks	Fly Tour	October 1, 2000	
The Doobie Brothers	What Were Once Vices Are Now Habits Tour	May 10, 1974	
The Doobie Brothers	Stampede Tour	April 7, 1975	
The Doobie Brothers	Takin' It to the Streets Tour	April 16, 1976	
The Doobie Brothers	Minute by Minute Tour	December 10, 1978	
The Doobie Brothers	One Step Closer Tour	November 7, 1980	Kansas & LeRoux
Duran Duran	Sing Blue Silver Tour	March 25, 1984	Prince Charles & The City Beat Band
Eagles	One of These Nights Tour	May 30, 1975	
Eddie Money	No Control Tour	December 3, 1982	.38 Special
Eddie Murphy	Pieces of my Mind Tour	August 22, 1986	
Edgar Winter Group	Jasmine Nightdreams Tour	November 1, 1975	Dave Mason
Electric Light Orchestra	ELO 2 Tour	July 9, 1973	
Electric Light Orchestra	On the Third Day Tour	November 30, 1973	
Electric Light Orchestra	Face the Music Tour	April 2, 1976	Journey
Electric Light Orchestra	A New World Record Tour	March 11, 1977	
Elton John	Tumbleweed Connection Tour	May 30, 1971	
Elton John	Honky Château Tour	November 24, 1972	
Elton John	Medusa Tour	September 23, 1999	
Elton John	Songs from the West Coast Tour	September 12, 2002	
Elvis Presley & the TCB Band	1972 North American Tour	April 16, 1972 (2 shows)	
Elvis Presley & the TCB Band	1975 North American Tour	April 25, 1975	
Elvis Presley & the TCB Band	1976 North American Tour	September 1, 1976	
Elvis Presley & the TCB Band	1977 North American Tour	May 30, 1977	
Emerson, Lake & Palmer	Trilogy Tour	April 1, 1972	
Emerson, Lake & Palmer	Works Volume 1 Tour	November 25, 1977	
Eric Clapton	There's One in Every Crowd Tour	June 15, 1975	Santana
Eric Clapton	No Reason to Cry Tour	November 7, 1976	Charlie Daniels Band
Eric Clapton	Another Ticket Tour	June 28, 1982	
Filter	Short Bus Tour	December 2, 1996	
The Firm	The Firm Tour	April 16, 1985	
Foghat	Stone Blue Tour	June 16, 1978	Rainbow
Foghat	Tight Shoes Tour	September 27, 1980	
Foreigner	Double Vision Tour	October 6, 1978	
Foreigner	4 World Tour	March 17, 1982	Bryan Adams
Frank Sinatra	1976 Tour	November 16, 1976	
Frank Sinatra	1992 Tour	April 26, 1992	
Garth Brooks	1997 World Tour	February 27, 1997	
Garth Brooks	1997 World Tour	February 28, 1997	
Garth Brooks	1997 World Tour	March 1, 1997	
Garth Brooks	1997 World Tour	March 2, 1997	
Garth Brooks	1997 World Tour	March 3, 1997	
Garth Brooks	1997 World Tour	March 4, 1997	
Genesis	Mama Tour	December 15, 1983	
Golden Earring	Switch Tour	May 16, 1975	Robin Trower Band
Grand Funk Railroad	Live Album	June 23, 1970	
Grand Funk Railroad	Phoenix Tour	November 12, 1972	
Grateful Dead	Terrapin Station Tour	April 8, 1978	
Hall & Oates	H2O Tour	May 15, 1983	
Hall & Oates	Big Bam Boom Tour	February 20, 1985	General Public
Hank Williams, Jr.	Born to Boogie Tour	March 6, 1988	Earl Thomas Conley
Heart	Dog & Butterfly Tour	February 9, 1979	Firefall
Heart	Private Audition Tour	November 7, 1982	John Cougar Mellencamp
Heart	Heart Tour	October 27, 1985	Autograph
Heart	1986 Tour	April 25, 1986	Honeymoon Suite
Heart	Brigade Tour	November 9, 1990	Cheap Trick
Honda Civic Tour	2nd Annual Honda Civic Tour	June 27, 2002	
Huey Lewis and the News	Heart and Soul Tour	August 4, 1984	Stevie Ray Vaughan & Double Trouble
Huey Lewis and the News	Fore! Tour	January 30, 1987	Robert Cray Band
Humble Pie	Eat It Tour	July 30, 1973	
Iggy & The Stooges	Raw Power Tour	December 7, 1973	
Iron Maiden	World Piece Tour	October 15, 1983	Quiet Riot
Iron Maiden	World Slavery Tour	February 12, 1985	Twisted Sister
Iron Maiden	Somewhere on Tour	January 16, 1987	Yngwie Malmsteen
The Jackson 5	1st National Tour	December 30, 1970	
The Jacksons	Destiny World Tour	May 6, 1979	
Jackson Browne	1976 Tour	October 29, 1976	
The Jeff Beck Group	Jeff Beck Group Tour	October 21, 1972	Blue Öyster Cult
Jethro Tull	Benefit Tour	July 26, 1970	Mountain
Jethro Tull	Aqualung Tour	October 16, 1971	?
Jethro Tull	Thick as a Brick Tour	November 5, 1972	Gentle Giant
Jethro Tull	A Passion Play Tour	September 21, 1973	
Jethro Tull	War Child Tour	August 25, 1975	
Jethro Tull	Stormwatch Tour	November 2, 1979	U.K.
The Jimi Hendrix Experience	First U.S. Tour 1967	align="center"	The Monkees, The Sundowners
The Jimi Hendrix Experience	Electric Ladyland Tour	November 22, 1968	Cat Mother & the All Night Newsboys
Jimmy Buffett & the Coral Reefer Band	Volcano Tour	October 27, 1979	
Jimmy Buffett & the Coral Reefer Band	Rece$$ion Rece$$ Tour	January 21, 1992	Evangeline
John Denver	Back Home Again Tour	April 8, 1975	
John Denver	I Want to Live Tour	April 2, 1978	
John Denver	Autograph Tour	May 21, 1980	
John Denver	Seasons of the Heart Tour	May 21, 1982	
Johnny Cash	A Thing Called Love Tour	April 28, 1972	
Johnny Winter	Johnny Winter And Tour	June 19, 1970	The Allman Brothers Band
Journey	Departure Tour	April 26, 1980	The Babys
Journey	Escape Tour	October 15, 1981	Loverboy
Journey	Raised on Radio Tour	November 21, 1986	Glass Tiger
Judas Priest	Metal Conqueror Tour	June 30, 1984	Kick Axe
Judas Priest	Mercenaries of Metal Tour	September 16, 1988	Cinderella
Kansas	Point of Know Return Tour	October 30, 1977	Atlanta Rhythm Section
Kansas	Monolith Tour	November 24, 1979	
Kansas	Drastic Measures Tour	November 11, 1983	Heart
Kenny Rogers	Share Your Love Tour	October 6, 1981	Dottie West
Kenny Rogers	Love Will Turn You Around Tour	October 5, 1982	Larry Gatlin & The Gatlin Brothers Band
Kenny Rogers	What About Me? Tour	September 25, 1984	Eddie Rabbitt & Helen Reddy
Kid Rock & Twisted Brown Trucker	Devil Without a Cause Tour	July 6, 1999	Limp Bizkit, Staind
Kid Rock & Twisted Brown Trucker	Cocky Tour	April 28, 2002	
The Kinks	Low Budget Tour	August 26, 1980	
KISS	Alive! Tour	December 6, 1975	Styx
KISS	Rock & Roll Over Tour	December 10, 1976	Uriah Heep
KISS	Lick It Up Tour	December 31, 1983	
KISS	Asylum Tour	January 10, 1986	W.A.S.P.
KISS	Crazy Nights Tour	February 14, 1988	Ted Nugent
KISS	Hot in the Shade Tour	August 1, 1990	Slaughter & Danger Danger
KISS	Alive/Worldwide Tour	September 19, 1996	Verve Pipe
Kool & the Gang	Something Special Tour	April 23, 1982	Skyy & The Whatnauts
Led Zeppelin	1969 North American Tour	August 24, 1969	
Led Zeppelin	1973 North American Tour	May 7, 1973	
Limp Bizkit	Limptropolis	July 6, 1999	Kid Rock
Little River Band	First Under the Wire Tour	September 7, 1979	
Little River Band	The Net Tour	July 14, 1983	
LL Cool J	Def Jam '87 Tour	July 11, 1987	Whodini, Public Enemy & Doug E. Fresh and The Get Fresh Crew
LL Cool J	Nitro Tour	September 7, 1989	De La Soul
Luciano Pavarotti & The Jacksonville Symphony Orchestra		January 4, 1989	
Luther Vandross	The Night I Fell in Love Tour	May 31, 1985	Cheryl Lynn & Ready for the World
Lynyrd Skynyrd	Nuthin' Fancy Tour	July 6, 1975	
Lynyrd Skynyrd	Gimme Back My Bullets Tour	May 1, 1976	
Lynyrd Skynyrd	Lynyrd Skynyrd Tribute Tour	October 16, 1987	The Rossington Band
Marilyn Manson	Dead to the World Tour	April 17, 1997	
The Marshall Tucker Band	A New Life Tour	October 1, 1974	Jo Jo Gunne
Mary J. Blige	No More Drama Tour	July 9, 2002	Tweet
MC Hammer	Too Legit to Quit World Tour	April 8, 1992	Jodeci, TLC, Oaktown 357, Mary J. Blige
Meat Loaf & His Neverland Express	Bat Out of Hell Tour	July 4, 1978	
Men at Work	Cargo Tour	September 19, 1983	Mental As Anything
Metallica	Damaged Justice Tour	February 17, 1989	Queensrÿche
Metallica	Wherever We May Roam Tour	March 15, 1992	30 minute video of Metallica
Michael W. Smith	Christmas Time Tour	December 13, 2002	
Molly Hatchet	Flirtin' with Disaster Tour	May 5, 1979	Point Blank & Stillwater
The Monkees	1967 North American Tour	July 8, 1967	The Jimi Hendrix Experience & The Sundowners
The Monkees	1969 North American Tour	May 3, 1969	
The Moody Blues	Octave Tour	May 5, 1979	Jimmie Spheeris
Mötley Crüe	Girls, Girls, Girls Tour	November 27, 1987	Guns N' Roses
Mötley Crüe	Dr. Feelgood Tour	March 27, 1990	Faster Pussycat
Mott the Hoople	Mott Tour	October 6, 1973	Aerosmith
NSYNC	Ain't No Stoppin' Us Now Tour	March 3, 1999	Divine & Tatyana Ali
Natalie Cole	I Love You So Tour	April 1, 1979	Sister Sledge
Nazareth	Razamanaz Tour	October 3, 1973	ZZ Top
Neil Diamond	Just for You Tour	November 24, 1967	
New Kids on the Block	The Magic Summer Tour	March 21, 1991	
Night Ranger	Big Life Tour	June 28, 1987	The Outfield
Nine Inch Nails	Further Down the Spiral Tour	November 18, 1994	Marilyn Manson & Jim Rose Circus
No Doubt	Tragic Kingdom Tour	May 3, 1997	
The O'Jays	My Favorite Person Tour	May 15, 1982	The Bar-Kays, Cameo & Atlantic Starr
Outlaws	Playin' to Win Tour	December 30, 1978	Pat Travers Band
Ozzy Osbourne	Bark at the Moon Tour	May 18, 1984	Mötley Crüe
Page & Plant	Walking into Clarksdale Tour	May 23, 1998	Lili Haydn
Pantera	The Great Southern Trendkill Tour	July 5, 1996	White Zombie
Parliament-Funkadelic	1979 Tour	March 11, 1979	The Brides of Funkenstein
Pat Benatar	Get Nervous Tour	February 18, 1983	
Pink Floyd	Dark Side of the Moon Tour	June 27, 1973	
Poison	Open Up and Say... Ahh! Tour	March 13, 1989	Tesla
The Police	Ghost in the Machine Tour	March 13, 1982	Joan Jett & the Blackhearts
Prince & The Revolution	Controversy Tour	January 3, 1982	The Time & Zapp
Prince & The Revolution	1999 Tour	February 19, 1983	The Time & Vanity 6
Queensrÿche	Empire Tour	July 6, 1991	Suicidal Tendencies
Randy Travis	Always & Forever Tour	March 18, 1988	The Judds
Ratt	Invasion of Your Privacy Tour	December 8, 1985	Bon Jovi
Ratt	Dancing Undercover Tour	March 5, 1987	Poison
Ratt	Reach For The Sky Tour	April 29, 1989	Great White, Kix
Ray Charles	Ingredients in a Recipe for Soul Tour	August 13, 1963	
Reba McEntire	If You See Him Tour	July 15, 1998	Brooks & Dunn, Terri Clark & David Kersh
REO Speedwagon	R.E.O. Tour	August 6, 1977	AC/DC
REO Speedwagon	Nine Lives Tour	November 21, 1979	Pat Travers
REO Speedwagon	Wheels Are Turnin' Tour	December 16, 1984	Survivor & Zebra
REO Speedwagon	2001 Tour	February 7, 2001	Styx & Survivor
Rick James	Bustin' Out of L Seven Tour	July 28, 1979	Raydio & Mass Production
Rick James	Fire It Up Tour	March 7, 1980	Prince & Twennynine
Rick James	Street Songs Tour	August 29, 1981	Cameo & Teena Marie
Rick James	Throwin' Down Tour	July 16, 1982	Dazz Band & One Way
Rick Springfield	Living in Oz Tour	August 5, 1983	Sparks
Robert Plant	Now and Zen Tour	July 13, 1988	Cheap Trick
Rod Stewart	Foot Loose & Fancy Free Tour	November 21, 1977	
Rod Stewart	Worth Leavin' Home For Tour	November 21, 1981	
Rod Stewart	Camouflage Tour	October 5, 1984	
The Rolling Stones	1965 North American Tour	May 8, 1965	
Rossington Collins Band	Anytime, Anyplace, Anywhere Tour	January 3, 1981	Stillwater
Run–D.M.C.	Raising Hell Tour	July 12, 1986	Beastie Boys, Whodini & LL Cool J
Run–D.M.C.	Run's House Tour	June 3, 1988	Public Enemy, D.J. Jazzy Jeff & the Fresh Prince
Rush	Drive 'Til You Die Tour	December 11, 1977	Bob Seger & The Silver Bullet Band
Rush	Moving Pictures Tour	September 21, 1980	Saxon
Rush	Exit...Stage Left Tour	November 29, 1981	Riot
Rush	Signals Tour	March 16, 1983	Jon Butcher Axis
Rush	Hold Your Fire Tour	February 18, 1988	Tommy Shaw
Rush	Presto Tour	February 18, 1990	Mr. Big
Rush	Roll the Bones Tour	February 26, 1992	Primus
Rush	Counterparts Tour	March 2, 1994	Candlebox
Santana	Welcome Tour	October 5, 1974	
Scorpions	Love at First Sting Tour	July 15, 1984	Bon Jovi
Scorpions	Crazy World Tour	May 21, 1991	Great White & Trixter
Scorpions	Face the Heat Tour	July 17, 1994	The Poor
Scorpions	2003 World Tour	January 29, 2003	Whitesnake & Dokken
Seals & Crofts	Unborn Child Tour	May 18, 1974	
The Smashing Pumpkins	1997 Tour	February 2, 1997	Fountains of Wayne
Spring Star Spectacular		April 7, 1967	
The Statler Brothers	Maple Street Memories Tour	January 16, 1988	Holly Dunn
Stevie Nicks	The Wild Heart Tour	November 2, 1983	Joe Walsh
Stevie Ray Vaughan & Double Trouble	Soul to Soul Tour	November 4, 1985	The Fabulous Thunderbirds
Stevie Wonder	In Square Circle Tour	August 24, 1986	
Sting	Brand New Day Tour	January 24, 2001	
Styx	Crystal Ball Tour	December 26, 1976	Black Oak Arkansas
Styx	The Grand Illusion Tour	December 2, 1977	UFO & Ram Jam
Styx	Pieces of Eight Tour	March 12, 1979	The Babys
Styx	Paradise Theater Tour	January 21, 1981	
Styx	Kilroy Was Here Tour	June 4, 1983	
Summer Music Mania Festival		August 13, 2000	
Sweet	Give Us a Wink Tour	February 20, 1976	
Tears for Fears	Songs from the Big Chair Tour	September 19, 1985	
Ted Nugent	Ted Nugent Tour	April 10, 1976	Robin Trower Band & Head East
Ted Nugent	Cat Scratch Fever Tour	July 22, 1977	
Teddy Pendergrass	TP World Tour	October 12, 1980	Stephanie Mills
Teddy Pendergrass	It's Time for Love Tour	October 3, 1981	
Ten Years After	Rock & Roll Music to the World Tour	October 13, 1972	
Ten Years After	Positive Vibrations Tour	May 25, 1974	
Tesla	The Great Radio Controversy Tour	August 5, 1989	
Tesla	Psychotic Supper Tour	October 4, 1992	
Thompson Twins	Here's to Future Days Tour	January 1, 1986	Orchestral Manoeuvres in the Dark
Tina Turner	Private Dancer Tour	December 3, 1985	Mr. Mister
Tom Petty and the Heartbreakers	Let Me Up (I've Had Enough) Tour	July 24, 1987	
Tom Petty and the Heartbreakers	Strange Behavior Tour	July 11, 1989	The Replacements
Toto	Toto Tour	January 19, 1979	
U2	The Unforgettable Fire Tour	April 30, 1985	Red Rockers
Uriah Heep	The Magician's Birthday Tour	December 9, 1972	Dio & White Trash
Uriah Heep	Sweet Freedom Tour	July 6, 1974	Manfred Mann's Earth Band
Uriah Heep	Return to Fantasy Tour	April 24, 1976	Skyhooks
Utopia	Todd Rundgren's Utopia Tour	July 31, 1975	
Van Halen	World Invasion "Party 'til You Die" Tour	August 10, 1980	
Van Halen	Hide Your Sheep Tour	December 11, 1982	
Van Halen	1984 Tour	January 18, 1984	Autograph
Van Halen	5150 Tour	April 12, 1986	Bachman–Turner Overdrive
Van Halen	For Unlawful Carnal Knowledge Tour	December 10, 1991	Alice in Chains
Van Halen	The Balance "Ambulance" Tour	March 12, 1995	Collective Soul
White Zombie	Astro Creep 2000 Tour	February 12, 1996	Filter
Whitesnake	Whitesnake Tour	February 19, 1988	Great White
Whitney Houston	Moment of Truth World Tour	December 2, 1987	Kenny G & Jonathan Butler
Widespread Panic	Ain't Life Grand Tour	September 27, 1994	
Willie Nelson & Family	The Sound in Your Mind Tour	May 18, 1976	Poco
Willie Nelson & Family	Stardust Tour	May 22, 1979	Leon Russell
Willie Nelson & Family	Always on My Mind Tour	December 10, 1982	
Yes	Close to the Edge Tour	September 17, 1972	Eagles
Yes	90125 Tour	April 22, 1984	
ZZ Top	Worldwide Texas Tour	June 20, 1976	Elvin Bishop Group
ZZ Top	Expect No Quarter Tour	July 26, 1980	Point Blank
ZZ Top	Eliminator Tour	September 15, 1983	Grand Alliance
ZZ Top	Afterburner World Tour	March 18, 1986	Jimmy Barnes
ZZ Top	Recycler World Tour	April 3, 1991	Drag the River
