= Moving Pictures Tour =

1980–1981 concert tour by Rush

- Tour by Rush
- Poster to the concert in Allentown, Pennsylvania
- Location: North America
- Associated album: Moving Pictures
- Start date: September 11, 1980
- End date: July 5, 1981
- Legs: 2
- No. of shows: 95

Rush concert chronology
- Permanent Waves Tour (1979–1980); Moving Pictures Tour (1980–1981); Exit... Stage Left Tour (1981)

The Moving Pictures Tour was a concert tour by Canadian rock band Rush in support of their eighth studio album, Moving Pictures.

== Background ==
While preparing to enter the studio to record Moving Pictures, the band performed an isolated number of shows from September 11 to October 1, 1980 with Saxon as a support act. The tour began in Kalamazoo on February 20, 1981 and concluded on July 5 in East Troy. Max Webster, FM, Goddo and The Joe Perry Project were also opening acts for Rush on the tour. The March 27, 1981 performance in Montreal was recorded for the band's live album, Exit... Stage Left and its accompanying video. Each show was estimated to have cost $40,000 and featured back-projected film, pyrotechnics, and dry ice. 905,000 fans attended the shows overall, with the band making an estimated $4 million by the end of the tour.

== Reception ==
John Griffin from the Montreal Gazette who attended the performance in Montreal, noted that Geddy Lee's vocals sounded like a guinea pig with an amphetamine habit, but praised both Lifeson, referring to his guitar playing as ordinary at best, and Peart, acknowledging his drumming as an interesting aspect that he made so little of the massive drum kit.

Don Adair, a reporter from the Spokesman-Review opened his review of the band's show in Spokane, stating that the band gave the nearly full coliseum their money's worth, stating that it was heavy metal all the way complete with flash pot and thunderous decibels. Adair praised the band as a healthy rock and roll band, stating that it wouldn't bait the kids with pandering Van Halenesque sex and booze references, and healthy to do a two hour show with minimum posturing and carry the show with their orchestrated music. He also praised the lighting and effects that contributed to the dynamics of the performance which were designed by Howard Ungerlieder. He however, criticized that the music took it far too seriously, calling it pretentious.

Poster to the Toronto concerts

Roman Cooney from the Calgary Herald opened his review of the Edmonton performance, comparing Geddy Lee's vocals to a cat, but continued by stating that the band continued to push the heavy metal tide a little farther from imbecility. He claimed that if the band continued to spoil the heavy metal image and making their concerts more musically arresting than before, the group would be taken more seriously. Cooney commented on Peart's drum solo, noting it as "startlingly innovative". He later commented on the rest of the show with the band switching back and forth between "creative, exciting rock" and "insipid, banal exercises in needless noise and commotion". He concluded his review, stating that the band is becoming more adventurous on stage, being able to recreate the excitement their music had on vinyl.

== Set list ==
These are example set lists adapted from Rush: Wandering the Face of the Earth – The Official Touring History of what were performed during the tour, but may not represent the majority of the shows.

1980 Setlist

1. "2112: Overture/Temples of Syrinx"
2. "Freewill"
3. "By-Tor and the Snow Dog"
4. "Xanadu"
5. "Limelight"
6. "The Trees"
7. "Cygnus X-1 Book II: Hemispheres – Prelude"
8. "The Spirit of Radio"
9. "Closer to the Heart"
10. "Beneath, Between and Behind"
11. "Tom Sawyer"
12. "Jacob's Ladder"
13. "A Passage to Bangkok"
14. "Natural Science"
15. "Working Man"
16. "Finding My Way"
17. "Anthem"
18. "Bastille Day"
19. "In the Mood" (with Neil Peart drum solo)
  Encore
20. "La Villa Strangiato"

1981 Setlist

1. "2112: Overture/Temples of Syrinx"
2. "Freewill"
3. "Limelight"
4. "Book II: Hemispheres – Prelude"
5. "Beneath, Between and Behind"
6. "The Camera Eye"
7. "YYZ" (with drum solo)
8. "Broon's Bane"
9. "The Trees"
10. "Xanadu"
11. "The Spirit of Radio"
12. "Red Barchetta"
13. "Closer to the Heart"
14. "Tom Sawyer"
15. "Vital Signs"
16. "Natural Science"
17. "Working Man"
18. "Book II: Hemispheres – Armageddon"
19. "By-Tor and the Snow Dog"
20. "In the End"
21. "In the Mood"
22. "2112: Grand Finale"
  Encore
23. "La Villa Strangiato"

== Tour dates ==
List of 1980 concerts, showing date, city, country, venue and opening act(s)
Date	City	Country	Venue	Opening Act(s)	Attendance	Gross
September 11, 1980	Hampton	United States	Hampton Coliseum	Saxon	4,283 / 10,000	$34,820
September 12, 1980	Charlotte	United States	Charlotte Coliseum	Saxon	5,047 / 9,200	
September 13, 1980	Charleston	United States	Charleston Civic Center	Saxon	3,068 / 13,500	$25,894
September 14, 1980	Nashville	United States	Nashville Municipal Auditorium	Saxon	7,251 / 9,900	
September 16, 1980	Baton Rouge	United States	Riverside Centroplex	Saxon	8,500 / 10,500	
September 18, 1980	North Fort Myers	United States	Lee County Civic Center	Saxon	3,149 / 7,000	
September 19, 1980	Pembroke Pines	United States	Hollywood Sportatorium	Saxon	5,722 / 15,533	
September 20, 1980	Lakeland	United States	Lakeland Civic Center	Saxon	10,000 / 10,000	$84,600
September 21, 1980	Jacksonville	United States	Jacksonville Veterans Memorial Coliseum	Saxon	3,509 / 12,000	
September 23, 1980	Cincinnati	United States	Riverfront Coliseum	Saxon	4,616 / 17,500	
September 25, 1980	Philadelphia	United States	The Spectrum	Saxon	14,324 / 14,324	$120,483
September 26, 1980	Landover	United States	Capital Centre	Saxon	15,895 / 18,000	
September 27, 1980	South Yarmouth	United States	Cape Cod Coliseum	Saxon	7,181 / 7,181	$61,637
September 28, 1980	Springfield	United States	Springfield Civic Center	Saxon	2,200 / 7,500	
September 30, 1980	Allentown	United States	Allentown Fairgrounds	Saxon		
October 1, 1980	Portland	United States	Cumberland County Civic Center	Saxon		

List of 1981 concerts, showing date, city, country, venue and opening act(s)
Date	City	Country	Venue	Opening Act(s)	Attendance	Gross
February 20, 1981	Kalamazoo	United States	Wings Stadium	Max Webster	7,888 / 8,596	
February 21, 1981	Dubuque	United States	Five Flags Arena	Max Webster	3,945 / 5,200	
February 22, 1981	Davenport	United States	Palmer Alumni Auditorium	Max Webster	4,500 / 4,500	
February 24, 1981	La Crosse	United States	La Crosse Center	Max Webster	4,608 / 7,000	
February 26, 1981	Chicago	United States	International Amphitheatre	Max Webster	39,416 / 39,416	$450,856
February 27, 1981	Chicago	United States	International Amphitheatre	Max Webster	39,416 / 39,416	$450,856
February 28, 1981	Chicago	United States	International Amphitheatre	Max Webster	39,416 / 39,416	$450,856
March 1, 1981	Chicago	United States	International Amphitheatre	Max Webster	39,416 / 39,416	$450,856
March 2, 1981	Milwaukee	United States	Mecca Arena	Max Webster	9,741 / 9,741	$98,990
March 4, 1981	St. Louis	United States	Checkerdome	Max Webster	22,788 / 22,788	$212,824
March 5, 1981	St. Louis	United States	Checkerdome	Max Webster	22,788 / 22,788	$212,824
March 7, 1981	Louisville	United States	Freedom Hall	Max Webster	8,145 / 8,145	$66,671
March 8, 1981	Dayton	United States	Hara Arena	Max Webster	8,000 / 8,000	$44,000
March 10, 1981	Evansville	United States	Roberts Municipal Stadium	Max Webster	5,054 / 10,500	$39,585
March 11, 1981	Indianapolis	United States	Market Square Arena	Max Webster	16,000 / 16,510	$121,363
March 13, 1981	Detroit	United States	Cobo Hall	Max Webster	34,809 / 34,809	$353,100
March 14, 1981	Detroit	United States	Cobo Hall	Max Webster	34,809 / 34,809	$353,100
March 15, 1981	Detroit	United States	Cobo Hall	Max Webster	34,809 / 34,809	$353,100
March 21, 1981	London	Canada	London Ice House	FM	6,000 / 6,000	
March 23, 1981	Toronto	Canada	Maple Leaf Gardens	FM	39,180 / 39,180	
March 24, 1981	Toronto	Canada	Maple Leaf Gardens	FM	39,180 / 39,180	
March 25, 1981	Toronto	Canada	Maple Leaf Gardens	FM	39,180 / 39,180	
March 27, 1981	Montreal	Canada	Montreal Forum	Max Webster	14,055 / 14,055	
March 28, 1981	Ottawa	Canada	Ottawa Civic Centre	FM	9,349 / 9,349	
April 3, 1981	Tucson	United States	Tucson Community Center	Max Webster	8,407 / 8,407	
April 4, 1981	Phoenix	United States	Arizona Veterans Memorial Coliseum	Max Webster	14,137 / 14,137	
April 5, 1981	Albuquerque	United States	Tingley Coliseum	Max Webster	10,153 / 10,153	
April 7, 1981	Houston	United States	Sam Houston Coliseum	Max Webster	18,926 / 18,926	
April 8, 1981	Houston	United States	Sam Houston Coliseum	Max Webster	18,926 / 18,926	
April 10, 1981	Dallas	United States	Reunion Arena	Max Webster	15,439 / 15,439	
April 11, 1981	San Antonio	United States	Convention Center	Max Webster	14,118 / 14,118	
April 12, 1981	Fort Worth	United States	Tarrant County Convention Center	Max Webster	13,766 / 13,766	
April 14, 1981	Little Rock	United States	T.H. Barton Coliseum	Max Webster	5,251 / 10,250	
April 15, 1981	Jackson	United States	Mississippi Coliseum	Max Webster	6,676 / 10,000	$62,339
April 16, 1981	Memphis	United States	Mid-South Coliseum	Max Webster	9,537 / 9,537	$83,523
April 18, 1981	Mobile	United States	Municipal Auditorium	—N/a	9,772 / 9,772	
April 19, 1981	New Orleans	United States	Municipal Auditorium	—N/a	8,100 / 8,100	
April 21, 1981	Shreveport	United States	Hirsch Memorial Coliseum	—N/a	8,182 / 8,182	
April 23, 1981	Kansas City	United States	Kemper Arena	—N/a	24,438 / 24,438	$230,280
April 24, 1981	Kansas City	United States	Kemper Arena	—N/a	24,438 / 24,438	$230,280
April 25, 1981	Oklahoma City	United States	Myriad Arena	—N/a	13,552 / 13,552	
April 26, 1981	Tulsa	United States	Tulsa Assembly Center	—N/a	5,287 / 8,000	
May 6, 1981	Pittsburgh	United States	Civic Arena	FM	13,265 / 13,265	$140,020
May 7, 1981	Richfield	United States	Richfield Coliseum	FM	30,600 / 30,600	$275,890
May 8, 1981	Richfield	United States	Richfield Coliseum	FM	30,600 / 30,600	$275,890
May 9, 1981	Buffalo	United States	Buffalo Memorial Auditorium	FM	15,020 / 15,020	
May 11, 1981	Binghamton	United States	Broome County Memorial Arena	FM	5,558 / 7,000	
May 12, 1981	Rochester	United States	Rochester Community War Memorial	FM	10,130 / 10,130	$107,100
May 13, 1981	Syracuse	United States	Onondaga County War Memorial Auditorium	FM	7,072 / 8,200	
May 15, 1981	Glens Falls	United States	Glens Falls Civic Center	FM	6,759 / 6,759	$66,000
May 16, 1981	Landover	United States	Capital Centre	FM	37,252 / 37,252	
May 17, 1981	Landover	United States	Capital Centre	FM	37,252 / 37,252	
May 18, 1981	New York City	United States	Madison Square Garden	FM	17,292 / 17,292	$195,000
May 20, 1981	Uniondale	United States	Nassau Coliseum	FM	10,567 / 12,500	
May 22, 1981	Philadelphia	United States	Spectrum	FM	15,423 / 15,423	$137,703
May 23, 1981	Boston	United States	Boston Garden	FM	11,406 / 11,406	$120,391
May 24, 1981	Providence	United States	Providence Civic Center	FM	10,408 / 10,408	$93,251
June 1, 1981	Denver	United States	McNichols Sports Arena	FM	14,572 / 14,572	
June 3, 1981	Salt Lake City	United States	Salt Palace	FM	12,228 / 12,228	
June 5, 1981	Oakland	United States	Oakland-Alameda County Coliseum Arena	FM	23,752 / 23,752	$212,668
June 6, 1981	Oakland	United States	Oakland-Alameda County Coliseum Arena	FM	23,752 / 23,752	$212,668
June 7, 1981	Fresno	United States	Selland Arena	FM	6,995 / 6,995	$66,291
June 9, 1981	San Diego	United States	San Diego Sports Arena	FM	12,339 / 12,339	$114,670
June 10, 1981	Inglewood	United States	The Forum	FM	29,344 / 29,344	$275,240
June 11, 1981	Inglewood	United States	The Forum	FM	29,344 / 29,344	$275,240
June 12, 1981	Anaheim	United States	Convention Center	FM	7,321 / 7,321	$74,884
June 14, 1981	Long Beach	United States	Long Beach Arena	FM	12,796 / 12,796	$131,438
June 15, 1981	Las Vegas	United States	Aladdin Theatre	—N/a	7,450 / 7,450	$89,400
June 16, 1981	Reno	United States	Centennial Coliseum	—N/a	6,500 / 6,500	
June 18, 1981	Seattle	United States	Seattle Center Coliseum	FM	24,640 / 24,640	$237,324
June 19, 1981	Seattle	United States	Seattle Center Coliseum	FM	24,640 / 24,640	$237,324
June 20, 1981	Portland	United States	Memorial Coliseum	FM	9,780 / 9,780	$98,944
June 21, 1981	Spokane	United States	Spokane Coliseum	FM	6,172 / 6,172	$53,930
June 23, 1981	Vancouver	Canada	Pacific Coliseum	Goddo	11,645 / 11,645	$121,668
June 25, 1981	Edmonton	Canada	Northlands Coliseum	Goddo	11,363 / 11,363	$129,661
July 2, 1981	Bloomington	United States	Metropolitan Sports Center	The Joe Perry Project	23,690 / 23,690	$249,390
July 3, 1981	Bloomington	United States	Metropolitan Sports Center	The Joe Perry Project	23,690 / 23,690	$249,390
July 4, 1981	East Troy	United States	Alpine Valley Music Theatre	The Joe Perry Project	28,211 / 40,000	$394,900
July 5, 1981	East Troy	United States	Alpine Valley Music Theatre	The Joe Perry Project	28,211 / 40,000	$394,900

== Personnel ==
- Geddy Lee – vocals, bass, keyboards
- Alex Lifeson – guitar, backing vocals
- Neil Peart – drums
