= Exit... Stage Left Tour =

1981 concert tour by Rush

- Tour by Rush
- Poster with the UK tour dates
- Location: Europe; North America
- Associated album: Exit... Stage Left
- Start date: October 29, 1981
- End date: December 22, 1981
- Legs: 2
- No. of shows: 34

Rush concert chronology
- Moving Pictures Tour (1980–1981); Exit... Stage Left Tour (1981); Signals Tour (1982–1983)

The Exit... Stage Left Tour was a concert tour by Canadian rock band Rush, in support of the band's second live album Exit... Stage Left and its accompanying video.

== Background ==
The European leg of the tour was supported by Girlschool. Riot was the opening act for the band on the North American leg, performing in arenas.

== Set list ==
This is an example set list adapted from Rush: Wandering the Face of the Earth – The Official Touring History of what were performed during the tour, but may not represent the majority of the shows. The set list was similar to the setlist from the previous tour, but featured the song "Subdivisions" which would later be featured on the band's 1982 studio album Signals. "New World Man" and "Chemistry" were both performed only at the soundchecks before a show.

1. "2112: Overture/Temples of Syrinx"
2. "Freewill"
3. "Limelight"
4. "Book II: Hemispheres – Prelude"
5. "Beneath, Between and Behind"
6. "Subdivisions"
7. "The Camera Eye"
8. "YYZ"
9. "Broon's Bane"
10. "The Trees"
11. "Xanadu"
12. "The Spirit of Radio"
13. "Red Barchetta"
14. "Closer to the Heart"
15. "Tom Sawyer"
16. "Vital Signs"
17. "Working Man"
18. "Book II: Hemispheres – Armageddon"
19. "By-Tor and the Snow Dog"
20. "In the End"
21. "In the Mood"
22. "2112: Grand Finale"
  Encore
23. "La Villa Strangiato"

== Tour dates ==
List of 1981 concerts, showing date, city, country, venue and opening act(s)
Date	City	Country	Venue	Opening Act(s)	Attendance	Gross
October 29, 1981	Stafford	England	New Bingley Hall	—N/a	16,000 / 16,000	-
October 30, 1981	Stafford	England	New Bingley Hall	—N/a	16,000 / 16,000	-
October 31, 1981	Queensferry	Wales	Deeside Leisure Centre	—N/a	-	-
November 2, 1981	Brighton	England	Brighton Centre	—N/a	-	-
November 4, 1981	London	England	Wembley Arena	—N/a	-	-
November 5, 1981	London	England	Wembley Arena	—N/a	-	-
November 6, 1981	London	England	Wembley Arena	—N/a	-	-
November 8, 1981	Ingliston	Scotland	Royal Highland Centre	—N/a	-	-
November 9, 1981	Stafford	England	New Bingley Hall	—N/a	8,000 / 8,000	-
November 11, 1981	Hamburg	West Germany	Musikhalle	Girlschool	-	-
November 12, 1981	Neunkirchen am Brand	West Germany	Hemmerleinhalle	Girlschool	-	-
November 14, 1981	Rotterdam	Netherlands	Ahoy Sportpaleis	Girlschool	-	-
November 16, 1981	Munich	West Germany	Circus Krone	Girlschool	-	-
November 17, 1981	Rüsselsheim am Main	West Germany	Walter-Köbel-Halle	Girlschool	-	-
November 18, 1981	Böblingen	West Germany	Sporthalle	Girlschool	-	-
November 19, 1981	Böblingen	West Germany	Sporthalle	Girlschool	-	-
November 20, 1981	Karlsruhe	West Germany	Schwarzwaldhalle	Girlschool	-	-
November 21, 1981	Essen	West Germany	Grugahalle	Girlschool	-	-
November 28, 1981	Pembroke Pines	United States	Hollywood Sportatorium	Riot	12,837 / 12,837	$122,480
November 29, 1981	Jacksonville	United States	Jacksonville Veterans Memorial Coliseum	Riot	9,467 / 11,628	$88,673
December 1, 1981	Birmingham	United States	Birmingham-Jefferson Civic Center	Riot	7,398 / 9,000	$70,281
December 2, 1981	Nashville	United States	Nashville Municipal Auditorium	Riot	9,900 / 9,900	$83,742
December 4, 1981	Charlotte	United States	Charlotte Coliseum	Riot	12,900 / 12,900	$111,616
December 5, 1981	Fayetteville	United States	Cumberland County Memorial Arena	Riot	6,500 / 7,000	-
December 6, 1981	Greensboro	United States	Greensboro Coliseum	Riot	8,534 / 11,176	$76,826
December 8, 1981	Knoxville	United States	Knoxville Civic Coliseum	Riot	8,959 / 10,000	$76,610
December 9, 1981	Atlanta	United States	The Omni	Riot	13,558 / 13,558	-
December 11, 1981	Greenville	United States	Greenville Memorial Auditorium	Riot	7,000 / 7,000	$60,735
December 12, 1981	Johnson City	United States	Freedom Hall Civic Center	Riot	6,802 / 8,500	$60,750
December 13, 1981	Roanoke	United States	Roanoke Civic Center Coliseum	Riot	7,406 / 11,000	$63,568
December 15, 1981	Norfolk	United States	Scope Arena	Riot	13,140 / 13,140	-
December 20, 1981	Hartford	United States	Hartford Civic Center	Riot	12,385 / 12,385	$128,825
December 21, 1981	East Rutherford	United States	Brendan Bryne Meadowlands Arena	Riot	37,247 / 38,270	$437,743
December 22, 1981	East Rutherford	United States	Brendan Bryne Meadowlands Arena	Riot	37,247 / 38,270	$437,743

=== Box office score data ===
List of box office score data with date, city, venue, attendance, gross, references
Date (1981)	City	Venue	Attendance	Gross	Ref(s)
December 1	Birmingham, United States	Birmingham-Jefferson Civic Center	7,398 / 9,000	$70,281	
December 2	Nashville, United States	Municipal Auditorium	9,900	$83,742	
December 4	Charlotte, United States	Coliseum	12,562	$111,616	
December 6	Greensboro, United States	Coliseum	8,192 / 10,000	$76,826	
December 11	Greenville, United States	Memorial Auditorium	7,000	$60,735	

== Personnel ==
- Geddy Lee – vocals, bass, keyboards
- Alex Lifeson – guitar, backing vocals
- Neil Peart – drums
