= Veterans Memorial Wall =

Military monument in Jacksonville, Florida

Coordinates: 30°19′27.96″N 81°38′25.26″W

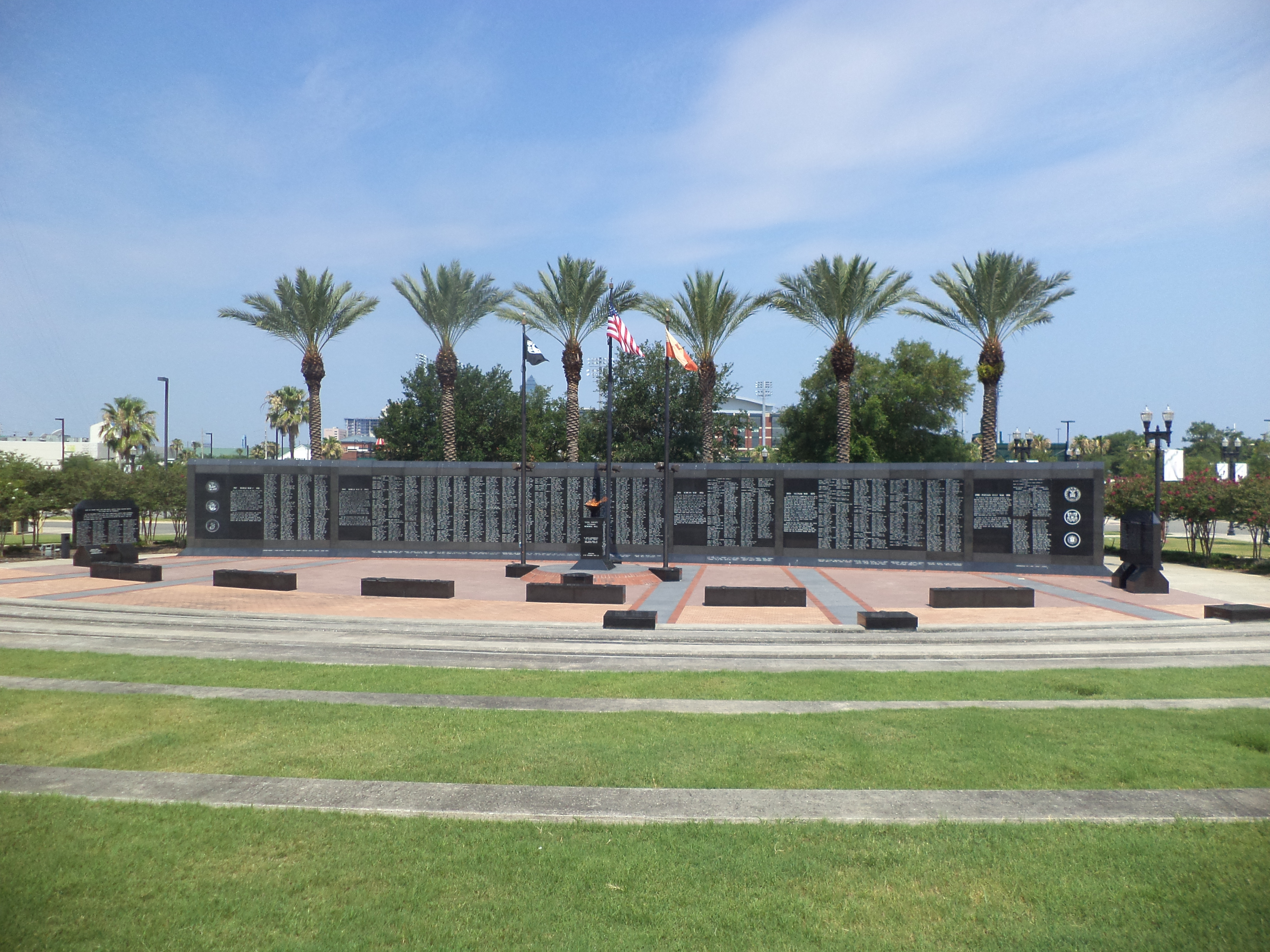
Full view of memorial wall

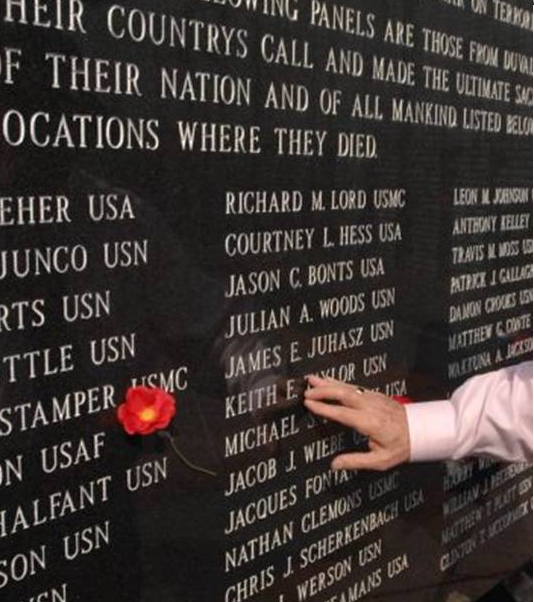
A hand reaches out to touch the name of a loved one.

The Veterans Memorial Wall is located at 1145 East Adams Street, adjacent to EverBank Stadium in downtown Jacksonville, Florida. The quarter-million dollar monument was dedicated in November, 1995 and serves as a tribute to more than 1,500 Jacksonville area American war heroes. The outdoor memorial was promoted as "the largest of its kind" and "the only wall that honors veterans from all six [service] branches" (Army, Navy, Marines, Air Force, Coast Guard and Merchant Marine). The 65-foot (20 m) long black granite monument contains the names of servicemen and women from World War I through Operation Desert Storm and the current war on terrorism. In front of the wall stands a torch with an eternal flame.

The Wall is the site of the city's Memorial Day ceremony, when any local servicewoman and serviceman who lost their lives in the prior year are honored and their names added to the obelisque.

Every Memorial Day since the monument was completed, a group of family, friends and classmates of Navy pilot Scott Speicher gather at the wall. Speicher, who grew up in Jacksonville, was shot down on the first night of Operation Desert Storm in 1991. His remains went unrecovered until August 2, 2009.

When the Wall was built, it was located just eight feet (2.4 m) from the exterior wall of the Jacksonville Veterans Memorial Coliseum, and extraordinary measures were taken to protect it when the Coliseum was demolished in 2003. When all of the debris was removed and the site restored to grade, the Memorial was surrounded by a 2-acre (8,100 m^{2}) walking park.

An additional 2,500-pound (1,130 kg) base and 5,000-pound (2,270 kg) panel were added in 2005 to provide space for those killed in Iraq and Afghanistan, but it became clear that the single panel would not be sufficient, based on the course of the war, so one more was added prior to the Memorial Day ceremony in 2010, the 15th anniversary of the monument. Ten names were added in 2010, four of which are on the most recent panel, which brings the total number to over 1,600. Four more names were added in 2014.
