= Exit... Stage Left (video) =

Video by Rush
- Released: February 13, 1982 (MTV); November 1982 (CED); June 1983 (Laserdisc); July 1983 (Betamax, VHS); May 1, 2007 (DVD)
- Recorded: March 27, 1981
- Venue: Montreal Forum (Montreal, Quebec)
- Genre: Progressive rock, hard rock
- Length: 60:00
- Label: Anthem/Mercury Records

Rush chronology
Exit... Stage Left (1982)	Grace Under Pressure Tour (1985)

Exit... Stage Left is a concert film by the Canadian band Rush that premiered on MTV in February 1982 and then released on CED, Laserdisc, Betamax, VHS and DVD at various times between 1982 and 2007. It documents a live concert performance by the band on their 1981 Moving Pictures tour. In October 1981, the band released an audio album of the same name of the same performance at the Montreal Forum, in Montreal, Quebec on vinyl LP, audiocassette, 8-track cartridge and (later) compact disc. The video has a different track list from the album, as well as voice-over comments from the band members about songwriting and performing. The four songs from the European dates of the Permanent Waves tour, included on the audio album, are not included on the video.

== Dates of release and formats ==
The concert film was originally shown on MTV. The CED was released in 1982. The laserdisc and videocassette versions were released in 1983. The CED, videocassette and laserdisc versions are currently out-of-print.

In 2006, a DVD version of the original production was released as part of the DVD box set, titled Rush Replay X 3 with its audio re-mastered in 5.1-channel Dolby Surround by Rush guitarist and co-producer Alex Lifeson. In 2007, the DVD version of Exit... Stage Left, as it was included in Rush Replay X 3, was released as a single, stand-alone DVD.

== Filming locations ==
The concert footage documented in Exit... Stage Left was filmed March 27, 1981, at the Montreal Forum, in Montreal, Quebec.

== Track listing ==
All songs are part of the live performance unless specified otherwise. All songs written by all three band members (Geddy Lee, Alex Lifeson, and Neil Peart) except where noted. A ">" symbol indicates a direct segue into the next track.

1. Intro (includes narration, with segments of "The Camera Eye" live version), 2:15
2. "Limelight", 4:38
3. "Tom Sawyer" (Lee, Lifeson, Peart, Pye Dubois), 5:00
4. "The Trees", 4:47 >
5. "Xanadu", 12:32 (narration at the beginning)
6. "Red Barchetta", 6:37
7. "Freewill", 5:50
8. "Closer to the Heart" (Lee, Lifeson, Peart, Peter Talbot), 3:30
9. "YYZ" (Lee, Peart) (segments of the live version, with interview audio) 1:25
10. "By-Tor and the Snow Dog", 4:13 >
11. "In the End" (Lee, Lifeson), 1:42 >
12. "In the Mood" (Lee), 1:35 >
13. "2112: Grand Finale", 2:42
14. End Credits ("YYZ"), 2:20

== Personnel ==
- Geddy Lee – bass and rhythm guitar, vocals, synthesizers, bass pedal synthesizer
- Alex Lifeson – electric and acoustic guitars, bass pedal synthesizer
- Neil Peart – drums and percussion

== Certifications ==
Region	Certification	Certified units/sales
United States (RIAA)	Gold	50,000^{^}
^{^} Shipments figures based on certification alone.
