= Jacob's Ladder (Rush song) =

Song by Rush

from the album Permanent Waves
- Released: January 14, 1980
- Recorded: 1979
- Studio: Le Studio (Morin Heights, Canada)
- Genre: Progressive rock; heavy metal
- Length: 7:28
- Label: Anthem
- Songwriter(s): Geddy Lee, Alex Lifeson, Neil Peart
- Producer(s): Rush; Terry Brown

"Jacob's Ladder" is a song by the Canadian rock band Rush. It was released on their 1980 album Permanent Waves.

== Composition and recording ==
The song was developed on the band's warm-up tour during soundchecks.

"Jacob's Ladder" uses several time and key signatures; it also possesses a dark, ominous feel in its first half. The lyrics are based on a simple concept; a vision of sunlight breaking through storm clouds. The song's title is a reference to the natural phenomenon of the sun breaking through the clouds in visible rays, which in turn was named after the Biblical ladder to heaven on which Jacob saw angels ascending and descending in a vision.

Drummer and lyricist Neil Peart said of the song:

Whereas most of the ideas we were dealing with this time were on the lesser side, and in some cases, like in "Jacobs Ladder", looked at as a cinematic idea. We created all the music first to summon up an image – the effect of Jacob's Ladder – and paint the picture, with the lyrics added, just as a sort of little detail, later, to make it more descriptive.

Robert Telleria said in the Rush book Merely Players:

Part heavy metal, part New Age, this song is not about the vision seen by Jacob in the Bible but rather the atmospheric phenomena that has been named after that image. The tympani pounding parts rock like apocalyptic earthquakes. Alex plays like he’s ascending the ladder in the clouds.

== Live performances ==
In early 2015, during the R40 Live Tour, frontman Geddy Lee incorrectly stated that the song had never been played live before; however, he was corrected by fans on the internet.

The live album Exit...Stage Left (1981) includes a performance of this song.

== Reception ==
Ultimate Classic Rock ranked the song 17th best on their list of "All 167 Rush Songs Ranked Worst to Best".
