= Exit... Stage Left =

Live album by Rush
- Released: October 29, 1981
- Recorded: June 10–11, 1980 at The Apollo, Glasgow (Side 2); March 27, 1981 at The Forum, Montreal, and other 1981 dates (Sides 1, 3, 4)
- Genres: Progressive rock; hard rock
- Length: 76:36
- Label: Anthem
- Producer: Terry Brown

Rush chronology
Moving Pictures (1981)	Exit... Stage Left (1981)	Signals (1982)

Singles from Exit... Stage Left
- 1. "Tom Sawyer" Released: October 16, 1981 (UK); 2. "Closer to the Heart" Released: October 20, 1981 (US)

Professional ratings
Review scores
Source	Rating
AllMusic	3/5 stars
The Encyclopedia of Popular Music	3/5 stars
The Essential Rock Discography	5/10
MusicHound Rock	4/5 stars
Rolling Stone	2/5 stars
The Rolling Stone Album Guide	3.5/5 stars
The Virgin Encyclopedia of 80s Music	3/5 stars

Exit... Stage Left is a double live album and the second collection of live recordings by Canadian rock band Rush, released on October 29, 1981 by Anthem Records. After touring in support of their eighth studio album Moving Pictures (1981), the band gathered recordings made over the previous two years and constructed a live release from them with producer Terry Brown. The album features recordings from June 1980 on their Permanent Waves (1980) tour, and from 1981 on their Moving Pictures tour.

Exit... Stage Left is the band's second live album, after All the World's a Stage (1976), and received mostly positive reception from music critics. It reached No. 6 in the United Kingdom, No. 7 in Canada, and No. 10 in the United States. It was certified platinum by the Recording Industry Association of America for selling one million copies in the latter country. A same-titled home video was released in 1982 that documents the band on the Moving Pictures tour. Exit... Stage Left was voted the ninth best live album of all time by Classic Rock magazine in 2004.

== Recording and production ==
Side two of Exit... Stage Left was recorded from June 10–11, 1980 at The Apollo in Glasgow, Scotland, during the band's tour for their seventh studio album, Permanent Waves. The remaining three sides were recorded during the subsequent tour of their eighth album, Moving Pictures.

After the 1981 tour, the band retreated to Le Studio in Morin Heights in Quebec, Canada to edit and mix the recordings they had made on the two tours, which Neil Peart noted totalled over 50 reels of two-inch tape. The band went through the material to find the best performances for inclusion for a live album. Whenever they found a technical fault or a wrong note affecting an otherwise acceptable performance, they replaced it using material from other shows in their collection of tapes. In 1993, Geddy Lee revealed that the band had to add in new sections in the studio to correct passages with out-of-tune guitars. None of the individual band members is credited with the album's production; the duty fell to their longtime producer, Terry Brown. During the production, Rush wrote and recorded "Subdivisions", a new song that would be released on their following studio album, Signals.

Upon the album's completion, Peart said the group were happier with Exit... Stage Left than with their first live album All the World's a Stage, noting that the latter suffered from uneven sound quality. In subsequent years however, Lee developed a more critical view of Exit... Stage Left, noting that the group tried to make it sound "too perfect" in part by reducing the levels of audience noise, while Alex Lifeson for his part thought the album sounded too clean and not as raw as All the World's a Stage, and as a consequence the band aimed to reach a "middle ground" between the two with A Show of Hands, Rush's third live release. Nevertheless, the album remains a fan favorite.

Rush performs a short rendition of "Ebb Tide" before "Jacob's Ladder". "Broon's Bane" is a short classical guitar arrangement performed by Lifeson as an extended intro to "The Trees". The song is named after Terry Brown, nicknamed "Broon" by the band. The song is not featured on any other live or studio recording by Rush. Also on the album, Lee refers to Brown as "T.C. Broonsie" when introducing "Jacob's Ladder".

The original CD issue removed "A Passage to Bangkok", as CDs could only hold 75 minutes at the time. It was included on the 1997 remaster, as CD capacity had increased to 80 minutes by that time. Before the remastered version was released, the same live version of "A Passage to Bangkok" was released on the compilation Chronicles in 1990.

The second verse of "Beneath, Between, & Behind" is omitted. On "La Villa Strangiato", the introductory classical guitar solo from the original recording is played on electric guitar and doubled in length, Lee sings part of a nursery rhyme in Yiddish during the "Danforth and Pape" section (the liner notes include a translation of his words), and a short bass and percussion solo is added before the "Monsters! (Reprise)" section.

== Title ==
The title comes from the catchphrase of the Hanna-Barbera cartoon character Snagglepuss. The term "stage left" is a stage direction used in blocking to identify the left side of a theater from the point of view of the performer, as opposed to the point of view of the audience.

The whole title came from a character in an American cartoon called Snagglepuss. He's a great little creature, a lion, and every time there's trouble he flees, uttering 'Exit... stage left' or 'Exit... stage right'. But the fact of the matter was that the album cover picture was taken from stage left. And coincidentally that's the direction in which Snagglepuss runs most of the time.

— Geddy Lee, Sounds magazine No. 66, November 1981

We wanted to have Snagglepuss's tail on there. You know, 'Exit Stage Left', with a picture of just his tail. Forget it! They wanted all kinds of legal hassles and tons of money.

— Neil Peart, Jam! Showbiz, October 16, 1996

== Artwork ==
An item from each of Rush's previous eight studio album covers can be seen on the front and back cover of this live album, though each has been modified in some way. The snowy owl from Fly by Night flies above Apollo, the man in the suit from Hemispheres, who stands next to Paula Turnbull, the woman from Permanent Waves. On the back cover, the puppet king from A Farewell to Kings sits atop a box stenciled with the band logo from Rush. Next to him is a painting of the Caress of Steel album cover, held by one of the movers from Moving Pictures, with another mover standing behind. Next to this is Dionysus, the nude man from Hemispheres. Behind this scene, the starman from 2112 hangs in the background, next to an "EXIT" sign. The scene was shot in Toronto's then-abandoned Winter Garden Theatre.

Rush's first live album, All the World's a Stage, is also represented by the cover's background image, taken at a concert at the Buffalo Memorial Auditorium in Buffalo, New York. Both album covers show Rush's live setup on an empty stage, although the band no longer used the white carpet by the time of Exit... Stage Left's release.

== Reissues ==
A limited-edition promotional 6-track vinyl sampler: Rush 'n' Roulette, included excerpts of six tracks from Exit...Stage Left. The promotional album used a unique mastering process in which concentric grooves were inscribed so that different material would be played depending on where the stylus was put down on the record's surface.

Exit... Stage Left was re-released on CD in 1997 as part of the "Rush Remasters" series.

- The tray has a picture of three fingerprints, light blue, pink, and lime green (left to right, mirroring the cover art of Retrospective II) with "The Rush Remasters" printed in all capital letters just to the left. All remasters from Moving Pictures through A Show of Hands are like this.
- Includes the track "A Passage to Bangkok" which was left off the original CD issue due to time constraints.
- On some copies, each of the band members' photos are reversed from the original. This error has since been corrected on post-1997 reissues of Exit... Stage Left.

Exit... Stage Left was remastered again in 2011 by Andy VanDette for the "Sector" box sets, which re-released all of Rush's Mercury-era albums. It is included in the Sector 2 set.

Exit... Stage Left was remastered for vinyl in 2015 by Sean Magee at Abbey Road Studios as a part of the official "12 Months of Rush" promotion. The high definition master prepared for this release was also made available for purchase in a 24-bit/48 kHz digital format at several high-resolution audio online music stores. These remasters have significantly less dynamic range compression than the 1997 remasters and the "Sector" remasters by Andy VanDette. Sean Magee remastered the audio from an analog copy of the original digital master, using a 192 kHz sample rate. But since Exit... Stage Left was originally mixed on digital equipment at 16-bit/44.1 kHz, no audio above 22 kHz exists in the original digital master or any of the remasters, which is why many digital music stores are only selling the album at a maximum sample rate of 48 kHz.

== Track listing ==
">" indicates a segue directly into the next track.

All tracks are written by Geddy Lee, Alex Lifeson and Neil Peart, except where noted.

Side one
No.	Title	Writer(s)	Length
1.	"The Spirit of Radio"		5:11
2.	"Red Barchetta"		6:46
3.	"YYZ" (includes a Neil Peart drum solo)	Lee, Peart	7:43

Side two
No.	Title	Writer(s)	Length
1.	"A Passage to Bangkok"		3:45
2.	"Closer to the Heart" (>)	Lee, Lifeson, Peart, Peter Talbot	3:08
3.	"Beneath, Between & Behind"	Lifeson, Peart	2:34
4.	"Jacob's Ladder"		8:46

Side three
No.	Title	Writer(s)	Length
1.	"Broon's Bane" (>)	Lifeson	1:37
2.	"The Trees" (>)		4:50
3.	"Xanadu"		12:09

Side four
No.	Title	Writer(s)	Length
1.	"Freewill"		5:31
2.	"Tom Sawyer"	Lee, Lifeson, Peart, Pye Dubois	4:59
3.	"La Villa Strangiato"		9:37

== Personnel ==
=== Rush ===
- Geddy Lee – bass guitar, vocals, synthesizers, Moog Taurus pedals, rhythm guitar (tracks 4 & 10)
- Alex Lifeson – electric, acoustic & classical guitars, Moog Taurus pedals
- Neil Peart – drums, percussion

=== Production ===
- Terry Brown – production, engineer (Canada)
- Guy Charbonneau – engineer (Canada)
- Andy Rose, Barry Ainsworth – engineers (UK)
- Paul Northfield – mix engineer
- Bob Ludwig at Masterdisk – original mastering
- Deborah Samuel – photography
- Hugh Syme – art direction, graphics, cover concept
- Moon Records – executive production

== Charts ==
Chart (1981–1982)	Peak position
Canada Top Albums/CDs (RPM)	7
Dutch Albums (Album Top 100)	19
Norwegian Albums (VG-lista)	28
UK Albums (Official Charts)	6
US Billboard 200	10

== Certifications ==
Region	Certification	Certified units/sales
Canada (Music Canada)	Platinum	100,000^{^}
United Kingdom (BPI)	Silver	60,000^{^}
United States (RIAA)	Platinum	1,000,000^{^}
^{^} Shipments figures based on certification alone.
