= Permanent Waves =

Studio album by Rush
- Released: January 14, 1980
- Recorded: September–October 1979
- Studios: Le Studio (Morin-Heights, Quebec, Canada)
- Genres: Progressive rock; hard rock; new wave
- Length: 36:05
- Label: Anthem
- Producers: Rush; Terry Brown

Rush chronology
Rush Through Time (1979)	Permanent Waves (1980)	Moving Pictures (1981)

Singles from Permanent Waves
- 1. "The Spirit of Radio" Released: February 1980; 2. "Entre Nous" Released: April 1980

Alternative cover
- 40th anniversary reissue

Permanent Waves is the seventh studio album by Canadian rock band Rush, released on January 14, 1980 through Anthem Records. The album charted at No. 3 in Canada and the UK, and No. 4 in the United States. By March 1980, the album was certified Gold by the RIAA for selling 500,000 copies. It became the fastest-selling Rush album up to that point, before Moving Pictures (1981) surpassed it the following year. Permanent Waves was later certified Platinum in November 1987 for selling over one million copies.

After touring for 1978's Hemispheres ended in the summer of 1979, the band retreated to a farm near Flesherton, Ontario to work on material for a new album. This period marked a shift in the group's songwriting towards concise arrangements and radio-friendly songs such as "The Spirit of Radio" and "Freewill", though their progressive rock blueprint is still evident on "Jacob's Ladder" and the nine-minute closer "Natural Science". The album is also the first to display a more restrained vocal delivery from bassist/vocalist Geddy Lee. Recording took place at Le Studio in Morin-Heights, Quebec with production handled by the group and Terry Brown.

The release of "The Spirit of Radio" as a single in February 1980 marked the first Rush single to crack the Top 30 in Canada. The album's six-month supporting tour was significant, becoming the first to earn the band a profit. A 40th anniversary edition of Permanent Waves with bonus material was released in 2020.

== Background and writing ==
In June 1979, the band finished an eight-month international tour in support of 1978's Hemispheres. The tour had taken its toll on the group and, for the first time in their history, each member agreed to take a six-week break. They regrouped at Lakewoods Farm near Flesherton, Ontario for two weeks to work on material for a new album and set up their equipment in the basement. In the first rehearsal session, the band arranged what drummer/lyricist Neil Peart described as "a giant hodge-podge of instrumental mish-mash" initially titled "Uncle Tounouse". The band decided not to develop the piece further, but sections of it were used as the basis of passages on other songs on Permanent Waves.

A typical day's schedule at Lakewoods Farm involved guitarist Alex Lifeson cooking breakfast for the trio, after which Lifeson and bassist/vocalist Geddy Lee worked on the music while Peart wrote lyrics at a nearby cottage. This routine had a productive effect on the three, with "The Spirit of Radio," "Freewill", and "Jacob's Ladder" being recorded within several days without considerable effort. The new songs marked a shift in the group's musical style towards more concise arrangements and radio-friendly songs, although Peart denied that the band consciously set out to produce commercial music. Lee said the idea behind the album was "to make sure we did not lose the ability to write songs", and noted it had been some time since they had, with "Circumstances" from Hemispheres being "close" but had lacked a "main flow". It also marked the first time Lee presented a more restrained vocal delivery in comparison to previous Rush albums, which he said was a "pleasant change" for him to sing closer to his speaking tone. Peart attempted to write a song based on Sir Gawain and the Green Knight, an epic narrative poem set in King Arthur's time, but it was abandoned after it was deemed too out of place with the other material.

After preparing some new songs, Rush moved into Sound Kitchen Studio in northern Toronto, Ontario with their longtime producer Terry Brown to put their ideas onto tape. "Jacob's Ladder", "The Spirit of Radio," and "Freewill" were further polished during soundchecks. For the first time in the group's history, they arranged a short warm-up tour in August and September 1979 prior to recording the material to test the new songs on stage and gauge audience reactions.

== Recording ==
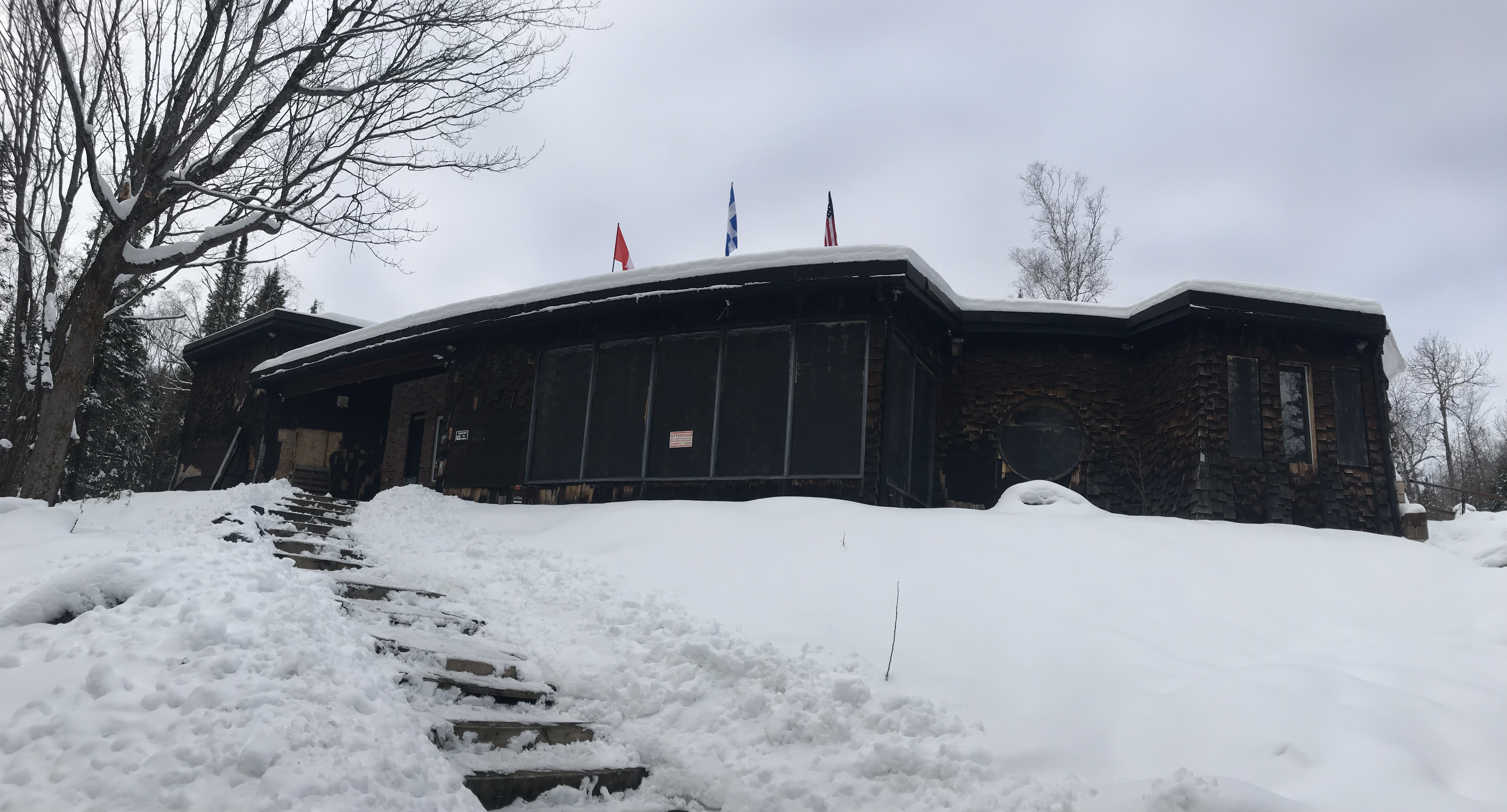
Le Studio, where Permanent Waves was recorded

In September 1979, Rush headed to Le Studio in Morin-Heights, Quebec to record Permanent Waves with Brown and engineer Paul Northfield. Having recorded their previous two studio albums in Wales the band felt it was time for a change and initially chose Trident Studios in London, but cancelled due to the high costs of studio time and accommodation. The idea of working in a busy city environment became something they now wished to avoid and instead sought a remote location.

The recording sessions involved the band tweaking the settings of instruments and positioning of microphones. They recorded basic tracks with multiple takes until they captured the best performance. While Lee, Lifeson, and Brown began overdubs, Peart began attempting to write another longer song, and after enduring three days of writer's block, "Natural Science" was born. Fin Costello was then brought in to photograph the band in the studio. Cover art director Hugh Syme was also brought in and played piano on "Different Strings". Music was composed for "Natural Science", with some parts reused from the discarded "Green Knight" track. The water sounds at the beginning of the song were created by splashing oars in the private lake, performed by Brown and studio assistant Kim Bickerdike, and the natural echo outside was used to record various instruments. The rough mixes on the album were complete, and the final mix was completed in two weeks at Trident Studios.

Upon the album's completion, Lifeson felt unsure about the record and for a period of time, could not listen to it due to his feeling that it failed to present any fresh ideas. His opinion changed when he first heard the album on the radio after its release, realising he had overreacted. The group had difficulty in coming up with a title for the album, partly due to a lack of a unifying or conceptual theme that previous Rush albums had. Peart said the title was a tongue-in-cheek reference to the New wave scene in music at the time, not towards the bands but the music press, particularly in England, "that is inclined to write off any band that was around last week and go for whatever's happening this week."

== Songs ==
"The Spirit of Radio" featured the band's early experiments with a reggae style in its closing section, which was explored further in the band's next three albums, Moving Pictures, Signals, and Grace Under Pressure. The group had experimented with reggae-influenced riffs in the studio and had come up with a reggae introduction to "Working Man" on their tours, so they decided to incorporate a passage into "The Spirit of Radio", as Lifeson said, "to make us smile and have a little fun." Peart wrote the lyrics with Toronto radio station CFNY-FM in mind which had adopted the title as its slogan.

"Jacob's Ladder" uses multiple time signatures, and possesses a dark, ominous feel in its first half. Its lyrics are based on a simple concept: a vision of sunlight breaking through storm clouds. The title is a reference to the natural phenomenon of the sun breaking through the clouds in visible rays, which in turn is named after the Biblical ladder to heaven on which Jacob saw angels ascending and descending in a vision. Early on the R40 Live Tour, Lee incorrectly stated that the song had never been played live before, but was corrected by fans online who clarified the song had been performed during the Permanent Waves tour and a live recording of the song was featured on the 1981 live album Exit... Stage Left.

"Entre Nous" (French for "Between Us") is what Peart described as a "personal letter" about relationships, "basically what it says is, let's stop fooling ourselves, we are different let's admit it." The lyrics were the only set completed prior to the band's arrival at Lakewood Farm. It was not performed live until the Snakes & Arrows Tour in 2007.

"Different Strings" was the first Rush song with lyrics written solely by Lee since "Tears" on 2112.

The nine-minute closing track "Natural Science" consists of three distinct parts, "Tide Pools", "Hyperspace", and "Permanent Waves". It is the only song on the album that was not written before the group entered Le Studio to record, and was put together during the recording phase. The opening and closing ambient sections were recorded outside Le Studio. The lyrics are driven by concepts of natural science.

== Artwork ==
The background scene comes from a photo, taken by Flip Schulke, of the Galveston Seawall in Texas during Hurricane Carla on September 11, 1961. The woman in the foreground is Canadian model Paula Turnbull, who is also featured on Exit... Stage Left (1981); the man waving in the background is sleeve designer Hugh Syme. To create the appearance of Turnbull's skirt blowing in the wind, a fan was placed out of frame when she was photographed.

== Release ==
Professional review ratings
Review scores
Source	Rating
Classic Rock	(2020)
mxdwn	(2020)
PopMatters	9/10 (2020)
Record Mirror	4.5/5 stars
Uncut	(2020)

Music guide ratings
Review scores
Source	Rating
AllMusic	4.5/5 stars
The Encyclopedia of Popular Music	4/5 stars
The Essential Rock Discography	6/10
MusicHound Rock	4/5 stars
The Rolling Stone Album Guide	3.5/5 stars
The Virgin Encyclopedia of 80s Music	4/5 stars

Permanent Waves was first shipped to Canadian radio stations on January 4, 1980, followed by its public release in Canada by Anthem Records on January 14. On the same day, 300,000 copies were shipped to the United States by Mercury Records, the band's international label. On the day of the radio release, Lee made a guest appearance on John Donabie and Ric Ringer's show on CHUM-FM in Toronto during the premiere broadcast of the album. Mercury promoted the album with a strong advertising campaign, and RPM Weekly reported an "intense early reaction" to the album, in particular the heavy radio airplay. The UK release followed on January 18 by Phonogram Records.

Permanent Waves became the fastest selling Rush album at the time of release and their biggest commercial hit, reaching No. 3 in Canada and the UK, and No. 4 in the US. In two months, the album had sold half a million copies in the US. The album was certified gold by the Canadian Recording Industry Association, and in September 1980 Rush sent the gold record to Terry Fox shortly after he had to abandon the Marathon of Hope. In November 1980, RPM Weekly reported the album had sold over 900,000 copies in the US.

The album received favourable reviews from sources such as Rolling Stone.

== Tour ==
Following the album's release, Rush supported Permanent Waves with a concert tour of Canada, America and the UK between January 17 and June 22, 1980. The band toured with a 25-member road crew who handled the 60 tons of equipment to stage the show, which included Boeing 707 landing lights, a $50,000 mixing console ($204,453.88 in 2026) and a screen projector behind the band. The tour cost $12,500 per day ($51,113.47 in 2026) and each band member earned $1,000 per show ($4,089.08).

== Reissues ==
Reissues
Year	Label	Format	Notes
2011	Anthem	CD	Digitally remastered by Andy VanDette as part of the reissue of Rush's Mercury-era albums
2015	Anthem/Mercury	CD, LP	Remaster with 24-bit/96 kHz and 24-bit/192 kHz formats
2020	Anthem/Mercury	CD, LP	40th Anniversary Edition with previously unreleased live content.

== Track listing ==
=== Original release ===
All lyrics by Neil Peart except "Different Strings" by Geddy Lee. All music by Lee and Alex Lifeson.

Side one
No.	Title	Length
1.	"The Spirit of Radio"	4:59
2.	"Freewill"	5:23
3.	"Jacob's Ladder"	7:30

Side two
No.	Title	Length
1.	"Entre Nous"	4:37
2.	"Different Strings"	3:50
3.	"Natural Science" I. "Tide Pools" (2:23) II. "Hyperspace" (2:47) III. "Permanent Waves" (4:08)	9:18

=== 40th Anniversary Edition (2020) ===
Bonus disc
No.	Title	Length
1.	"Beneath, Between & Behind" (Recorded at the Manchester Apollo, Manchester, UK)	2:30
2.	"By-Tor & the Snow Dog" (Recorded at the Hammersmith Odeon, London, UK) I. "At the Tobes of Hades" (0:44) II. "Across the Styx" (0:37) III. "Of the Battle" (4:33) i. "Challenge and Defiance" (2:53) ii. "7/4 War Furor" (1:40)	5:52
3.	"Xanadu" (Recorded at the Hammersmith Odeon, London, UK)	12:16
4.	"The Spirit of Radio" (Recorded at the Manchester Apollo, Manchester, UK)	5:08
5.	"Natural Science" (Recorded at the Manchester Apollo, Manchester, UK) I. "Tide Pools" (2:23) II. "Hyperspace" (2:51) III. "Permanent Waves" (3:33)	8:46
6.	"A Passage to Bangkok *†" (Recorded at the Manchester Apollo, Manchester, UK)	3:57
7.	"The Trees" (Recorded at the Manchester Apollo, Manchester, UK)	5:28
8.	"Cygnus X-1" (Recorded at the Hammersmith Odeon, London, UK) "Prologue" (4:27) "1" (0:41) "2" (0:15) "3" (2:43)	8:05
9.	"Cygnus X-1: Book II Hemispheres" (Recorded at the Hammersmith Odeon, London, UK) I. "Prelude" (4:27) IV. "Armageddon (The Battle of Heart and Mind)" (2:53) V. "Cygnus (Bringer of Balance)" (6:24) VI. "The Sphere (A Kind of Dream)" (1:02)	14:45
10.	"Closer to the Heart" (Recorded at the Manchester Apollo, Manchester, UK)	3:26
11.	"Jacob's Ladder" (Recorded at the Kiel Auditorium, St. Louis, Missouri.)	7:38
12.	"Freewill" (Recorded at the Hammersmith Odeon, London, UK)	5:46

* Included on the vinyl and digital deluxe releases only
† Previously available on 2112 Deluxe Edition (2012)

== Personnel ==
Credits are taken from the 1980 liner notes.

Rush

- Geddy Lee – vocals, bass guitar, Oberheim polyphonic synthesizer, Minimoog synthesizer, Taurus pedal synthesizer, Oberheim OB-1 synthesizer
- Alex Lifeson – electric and acoustic six- and twelve-string guitars, Taurus pedals
- Neil Peart – drums, timpani, timbales, orchestra bells, tubular bells, wind chimes, bell tree, triangle, crotales, cover concept

Additional musician

- Hugh Syme – piano on "Different Strings"

Production

- Rush – production, arrangements
- Terry Brown – production, arrangements, mixing
- Paul Northfield – engineer
- Robbie Whelan – assistant engineer
- Adam Moseley – mixing assistant
- Craig Milliner – mixing assistant
- Ray Staff – original mastering
- Deborah Samuel – photography
- Flip Schulke – photography
- Fin Costello – photography
- Paula Turnbull – cover girl (credited as "Ou La La")
- Robert Gage – hairdresser for cover girl
- Hugh Syme – art direction, design, cover concept
- Ray Danniels and Vic Wilson, SRO Productions – management
- Moon Records – executive production

== Charts ==
=== Weekly charts ===
Chart (1980)	Peak position
Canada Top Albums/CDs (RPM)	3
Dutch Albums (Album Top 100)	38
Norwegian Albums (VG-lista)	21
Swedish Albums (Sverigetopplistan)	26
UK Albums (Official Charts)	3
US Billboard 200	4

Chart (2020)	Peak position
German Albums (Offizielle Top 100)	47
Swiss Albums (Schweizer Hitparade)	65
US Top Hard Rock Albums (Billboard)	4
US Indie Store Album Sales (Billboard)	3
US Top Rock Albums (Billboard)	12

=== Year-end charts ===
Chart (1980)	Position
Canada Top Albums/CDs (RPM)	7
US Billboard 200	53

== Certifications ==
Region	Certification	Certified units/sales
Canada (Music Canada)	Platinum	100,000^{^}
United Kingdom (BPI)	Gold	100,000^{^}
United States (RIAA)	Platinum	1,000,000^{^}
^{^} Shipments figures based on certification alone.
