= The Sundowners (band) =

American rock and roll band

The Sundowners, sometimes credited as Bobby Dick and The Sundowners, was a 1960s era rock and roll band.

Formed in Glens Falls, New York, they originally played local venues around Lake George. Various lineups included Bobby Dick, Dominick DeMieri, Eddie Placidi, Eddie Brick, Kim Capli, Clutch Reiser, Jimmy Wilcox, and Chris Schempp. Although they continued to tour and perform through 2010, their most popular period came in the late 1960s when they were on the same bill as Jimi Hendrix and The Monkees in Jacksonville, FL (July 1967). They recorded and released various tunes including the 1967 single "Always You" which was released by the Decca label. The band's most ambitious recording, an album entitled Captain Nemo, was recorded during that same period and released in 1969. Their work included appearances on the television shows The Flying Nun and It Takes a Thief. They also appeared in the film Don't Make Waves. Their sound man (and occasional keyboard player), Jim Scorse, went on to form North Coast Engineering (NCE), a digital command control system for model railroads.

The band officially retired on January 31, 2011.

== Discography ==
- Captain Nemo (1969)
