= 1999 Tour =

1999 Tour may refer to a concert tour in 1999 including:

- 1999 Tour (Robbie Williams)
- 1999 Tour (Prince)
