= Jacksonville Coliseum =

Arena in Florida, United States

Coordinates: 30.3245961°N 81.640901°W

Jacksonville Veterans Memorial Coliseum
- The Coliseum; The Sports Mecca of the South
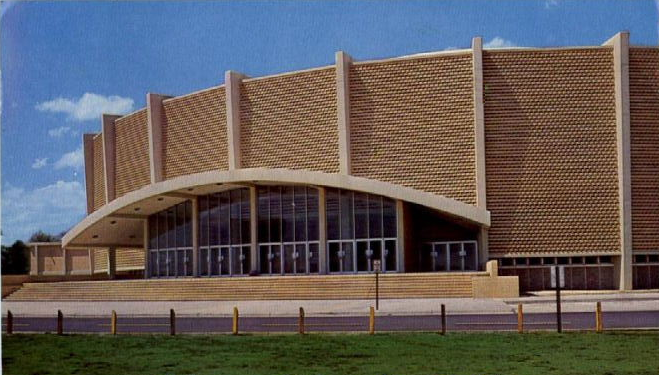
- Exterior of the venue (c.1996)
- Interactive map of Jacksonville Veterans Memorial Coliseum
- Former names: Jacksonville Coliseum (1960–68)
- Address: 1145 E Adams St; Jacksonville, FL 32202
- Location: Downtown Jacksonville
- Owner: City of Jacksonville
- Operator: SMG
- Capacity: 10,276

Construction
- Groundbreaking: 1958
- Opened: November 24, 1960
- Renovated: 1995
- Closed: June 20, 2003
- Demolished: June 26, 2003
- Cost: US$3 million ($33.5 million in 2025 dollars)
- Architects: A. Eugene Cellar; George Ryad Fisher
- General contractor: Daniel Construction

Tenants
- Jacksonville Rockets (EHL) (1964–72); Jacksonville Dolphins (NCAA) (1969–99); The Floridians (ABA) (1971–72); Jacksonville Barons (AHL) (1973–74); Jacksonville Tea Men (NASL) (1980–82); Jacksonville Stingrays (WBL) (1992); Jacksonville Lizard Kings (ECHL) (1995–2000); Jacksonville Tomcats (AF2) (2000–02); Jacksonville Barracudas (ACHL) (2002–03)

The Jacksonville Veterans Memorial Coliseum (originally and still commonly known as the Jacksonville Coliseum) was a multi-purpose arena located in Jacksonville, Florida. Built in 1960 and known as "northern Florida's most historic concert venue", it was home to most of the city's indoor professional sports teams and it hosted various concerts, circuses, and other events. It was demolished in 2003 and replaced with the VyStar Veterans Memorial Arena.

== History ==
The Coliseum was dedicated on November 24, 1960. The general contractor was Daniel Construction, and construction took two years and cost $3 million. The first event was the first ice hockey game ever played in Jacksonville, featuring the New York Rovers and Charlotte Clippers on November 30. The first events scheduled included an automobile show, a boat show, boxing matches, the circus, an ice skating show, a pro basketball exhibition game and a tennis tournament.

=== Events ===
Ice hockey teams based in the Coliseum included the Jacksonville Rockets (1964–1972) of the Eastern Hockey League, the Jacksonville Barons (1973–74), and the Jacksonville Lizard Kings (1995–2000). (Fans of the Lizard Kings referred to the coliseum as the "Reptilian Pavilion.") The American Basketball Association franchise known as The Floridians played some of its home games there in 1971 and 1972.

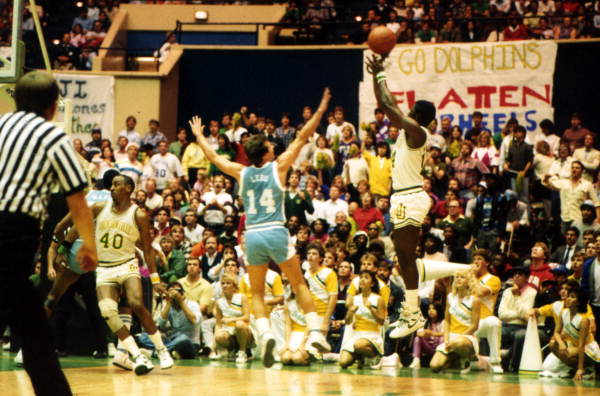
A game between the Jacksonville Dolphins and North Carolina Tar Heels men's basketball teams at the Coliseum in 1985

The Jacksonville Dolphins utilized the coliseum for their home basketball games from 1969 to 1999, and it hosted the 1981 Sun Belt Conference and 1999 and 2000 Atlantic Sun Conference men's basketball tournaments.

The Jacksonville Tea Men of the NASL played indoor soccer home games at the coliseum during the 1980–81 & 1981–82 seasons.

The Jacksonville Tomcats of the af2, the Arena Football League's developmental league, called the Coliseum home from 2000 to 2002.

The WCW events Clash of the Champions XIII: Thanksgiving Thunder, WrestleWar 1992, Clash of the Champions XXIX and WCW Greed (the final pay-per-view before WCW's acquisition by the World Wrestling Federation) were staged at the coliseum, as well as some episodes of WCW Monday Nitro.

Hundreds of thousands of Duval County high school students received their diplomas at ceremonies in the Coliseum, and the Ringling Bros. and Barnum & Bailey Circus train stopped in Jacksonville for two weeks of shows every January for decades. The fairgrounds were adjacent to the Coliseum, and the Greater Jacksonville Agricultural Fair incorporated the facility into their November event, hosting music concerts, entertainers and exhibitions. Monster truck shows, tractor pulls and motocross events were also very popular over the years.

The Coliseum hosted hundreds of concerts and shows during its 43-year history, including Grand Funk Railroad in 1970,Rush, Bob Dylan, Duran Duran, Billy Joel, Black Sabbath, Bon Jovi, Frank Sinatra, Jimi Hendrix, Elvis Presley, Jackson 5, New Kids On The Block, The Smashing Pumpkins, David Bowie, Bruce Springsteen, Led Zeppelin, Jacksonville's Lynyrd Skynyrd, Journey, AC/DC, Deep Purple, Wishbone Ash, Grateful Dead, Judas Priest, Three Dog Night, Def Leppard and Iron Maiden.

Famous Southern rock bands from Jacksonville that played at the Coliseum were The Allman Brothers Band in 1970 and 1979, Lynyrd Skynyrd in '75, 38 Special in '82, Molly Hatchet in '85, Blackfoot in '80, and also Limp Bizkit played there in 2000. Tom Petty and the Heartbreakers from Gainesville played there in '87.

== Demolition ==
By the 1990s, it became harder for promoters to fill the seats of the Coliseum. The venue was designed in the late 1950s before the advent of the rock concert, and strong bass and drums reverberated off the dome. The facility had not been renovated since its construction in 1960, giving the arena an outdated feel. It looked like a water treatment plant, according to Mayor John Delaney. Considered a mid-sized venue at best against its larger competitors, concert promoters for the most popular acts wanted venues with at least 15,000 seats; performers disliked the building's poor acoustics and the structure couldn't support the elaborate special effects lighting and sound equipment which rock concerts had come to require. The Eagles, Bon Jovi, Ozzy Osbourne, Dave Matthews and Fleetwood Mac all declined to perform at the Coliseum, although the acts wanted to perform in Jacksonville. The venue was still able to house exhibition shows, special events and several country acts including Alan Jackson, Garth Brooks, Reba McEntire, Wynonna Judd and the Dixie Chicks.

The Coliseum was imploded on June 26, 2003, and replaced with the $130 million Jacksonville Veterans Memorial Arena. Extreme care was taken not to damage the black granite Veterans Memorial Wall located just eight feet from the east wall of the building. After the debris was cleared, a 2-acre (8,100 m^{2}) walking park was added to the area around the Memorial.
