= Freewill (song) =

1980 song by Rush

Song by Rush

from the album Permanent Waves
- Released: January 18, 1980
- Recorded: September–October 1979
- Studio: Le Studio, Morin-Heights, Quebec
- Genre: Progressive rock; hard rock
- Length: 5:24
- Label: Mercury
- Composers: Geddy Lee; Alex Lifeson
- Lyricist: Neil Peart
- Producers: Rush; Terry Brown

"Freewill" is the second track on the 1980 album Permanent Waves by Canadian progressive rock band Rush. The song's music was composed by Geddy Lee and Alex Lifeson, and its lyrics written by Neil Peart. In a 2016 review of Rush discography for Ultimate Classic Rock, Eduardo Rivadavia described "Freewill" as a "cerebral but remarkably radio-friendly" song. Lee has stated that the final verse of "Freewill" is at the highest part of his vocal range.

Despite never being released as a single, "Freewill" has been included in several of the band's compilation albums, including Retrospective I, The Spirit of Radio: Greatest Hits 1974–1987, Gold, and Time Stand Still: The Collection. It is now a staple of album-oriented rock stations. It was one of six songs in Rush's set for the Molson Canadian Rocks for Toronto (colloquially referred to as "SARStock"). (Note: The setlist was "Tom Sawyer", "Limelight", "Dreamline", "YYZ", "Freewill", "Closer to the Heart", and "The Spirit of Radio". The band had opened their set with a jazzy cover version of the Rolling Stones song "Paint It Black".)

== Production ==
In mid-July 1979, the band began writing songs for Permanent Waves, with "Freewill" completed within the first few days. An early version of the song was first performed at Varsity Stadium in Toronto on 2 September 1979. This version was mostly complete, but its "familiar melody" had not yet been written. It was introduced to attending concertgoers as a song planned for the band's upcoming album, along with "The Spirit of Radio", both of which the band was testing before recording. The songs were performed three weeks later at a concert in Stafford, England, before the band went to Le Studio in Morin Heights, Quebec, to record Permanent Waves. It was the first time Rush had performed a song in concert before recording it in studio.

== Composition and structure ==
Lifeson says the guitar solo in the song is a "really hard solo to play", describing it as "frenetic and exciting" and "one of the most ambitious pieces of music Rush has ever done". In his book Rush, Rock Music and the Middle Class: Dreaming in Middletown, Chris McDonald describes Lifeson's play as a "searing, rapid-fire" guitar solo.

The song was also the last time Lee would sing with the piercing vocals in a studio recording. This represented a significant change in Rush's sound, as the strained "shrieking high range" of Lee's vocals were characteristic of the band's style from the 1970s. McDonald states that the song's last verse featuring Lee's high-pitched vocals is a "farewell to Rush's early style".

The song increases in complexity as it progresses. It features odd time signatures, with most of the song using 13/4 (6+7), but also employing 15/4 (4+4+4+3) in parts. The interlude with the bass and drums and subsequent guitar solo both have a 12/8 time signature, and other parts of the song use 4/4.

=== Lyrics ===
The song's lyrics deal with the subject of free will; in a December 1989 interview on Rockline, Lee stated that "the song is about freedom of choice and free will, and you believing in what you decide you believe in". In a 2015 article for Rolling Stone, Brian Hiatt describes "Freewill" as an "explicitly atheistic" song that mocks those who believe in a god, exemplified by the lyrics "choose a ready guide in some celestial voice". The libertarian and individualistic themes common to "Freewill" and "Tom Sawyer" are noted in The 100 Greatest Bands of All Time: A Guide to the Legends Who Rocked the World . According to Brett Barnett, "Freewill" more explicitly explores the theme of individualism than earlier works of Rush such as "Closer to the Heart", particularly with respect to an individual's control over destiny. Peart stated that in reality, exercising free will may not lead to self-determination in some circumstances.

The band has received questions from fans asking which version of the lyrics is correct: those on the album sleeve, or those recited by Lee during concerts. Peart stated that the two are the same, with the band taking "great care to make the lyric sheets accurate", but that fans sometime mis-hear the lyrics and believe the printed lyrics are incorrect. It was later discovered that the US printing of the album sleeve lyrics were incorrect, but that the Canadian printing contained the correct lyrics.

== See also ==
- List of songs recorded by Rush

== Notes ==
=== References ===
- Barnett, Brett A. (2016). "Rush's Lyrical Rhetoric of Oppression and Liberation: Extending "Freedom Songs" into the Progressive Rock Genre" (PDF). Relevant Rhetoric. 7.
- Bosso, Joe (4 February 2009). "Rush's Alex Lifeson: "My 3 Best Solos"". MusicRadar.
- Buttner, Christopher. "Geddy Lee – Vapor Trail Afterglow". PR That Rocks Agency. Archived from the original on 2008-10-16.
- Downing, Brian. "Freewill – Rush". AllMusic.
- Freedman, Robert (2014). Rush: Life, Liberty, and the Pursuit of Excellence. Algora Publishing. ISBN 9781628940848.
- Hiatt, Brian (16 June 2015). "From Rush with love". Rolling Stone.
- Kaelber, Randy (9 August 2005). "The Rush Frequently Asked Questions, part 2". Archived from the original on 22 February 2017.
- Lemieux, Patrick (2015). The Rush Chronology. Lulu.com.
- Mack, Bob (March 1992). "Confessions of a Rush fan". Spin. Vol. 7, no. 12. pp. 56–57. ISSN 0886-3032.
- McDonald, Chris (2009). Gass, Glenn; Magee, Jeffrey (eds.). Rush, rock music and the middle class: dreaming in middletown. Profiles in Popular Music. Indiana University Press. ISBN 9780253221490.
- Moskowitz, David V., ed. (2015). The 100 Greatest Bands of All Time: A Guide to the Legends Who Rocked the World. ABC-CLIO. ISBN 9781440803406.
- Peart, Neil. "Personal Waves – The Story Of An Album". Anthem Entertainment.
- Popoff, Martin (2004). Contents Under Pressure: 30 Years of Rush at Home and Away. ECW Press. ISBN 1550226789.
- Popoff, Martin (2016). Rush – Updated Edition: The Unofficial Illustrated History. Voyageur Press. ISBN 9780760349953.
- Rivadavia, Eduardo (29 October 2016). "35 years ago: Rush look back at their rise to stardom on 'Exit...Stage Left'". Ultimate Classic Rock.
- 25 Top Rock Bass Songs: Tab. Tone. Technique. Hal Leonard Corporation. 2015. ISBN 9781495032714.
