= The Tea Party discography =

Songs of The Tea Party group

- Studio albums: 9
- Extended plays: 3
- Live albums: 3
- Compilation albums: 1
- Singles: 25
- Music videos: 23

This is the discography for Canadian hard rock group The Tea Party.

== Albums ==
=== Studio albums ===
Year	Album	Peak chart positions		Label	Certifications
Year	Album	CAN	AUS	Label	Certifications
1991	The Tea Party	—	—	Eternal Discs	—
1993	Splendor Solis	20	30	EMI	MC: 2× Platinum
1995	The Edges of Twilight	10	8	EMI	MC: 2× Platinum; ARIA: Gold
1997	Transmission	3	5	EMI	MC: 2× Platinum; ARIA: Gold
1999	Triptych	4	14	EMI	MC: 2× Platinum
2001	The Interzone Mantras	10	6	EMI	MC: Gold
2004	Seven Circles	5	18	EMI	MC: Gold
2014	The Ocean at the End	17	18	Anthem Entertainment	
2021	Blood Moon Rising	—	—	Inside Out Music	

=== Compilation albums ===
Year	Album	Label	Peak chart positions	Certification
Year	Album	Label	AUS	Certification
2000	Tangents: The Tea Party Collection	EMI	63	MC: Platinum

=== Live albums ===
Year	Title	Label
1999	Live at the Enmore Theatre	EMI
2010	Live in Vancouver 2003	theteaparty.net
2012	Live from Australia	-

=== Demos ===
Year	Title
1992	Capitol Records Demo

== EPs ==
Year	Album	Label
1996	Alhambra	EMI
2017	Tx 20	Eternal Discs
2019	Black River EP	Coalition Music

== Singles ==
Year	Title	Peak chart positions				Album
Year	Title	CAN	CAN Rock	AUS	US Main	Album
1993	"The River"	39	—	99	—	Splendor Solis
1993	"Save Me"	49	—	—	—	Splendor Solis
1993	"A Certain Slant of Light"	77	—	60	—	Splendor Solis
1995	"Fire in the Head"	26	—	79	—	The Edges of Twilight
1995	"The Bazaar"	35	22	—	—	The Edges of Twilight
1995	"Shadows on the Mountainside"	—	—	—	—	The Edges of Twilight
1995	"Sister Awake"	61	—	—	—	The Edges of Twilight
1997	"Temptation"	21	4	57	36	Transmission
1997	"Babylon"	56	—	—	—	Transmission
1998	"Release"	—	18	—	—	Transmission
1998	"Psychopomp"	—	9	—	—	Transmission
1999	"Heaven Coming Down"	20	1	83	—	Triptych
1999	"The Messenger"	33	2	—	—	Triptych
2000	"Touch"	—	—	—	—	Triptych
2000	"These Living Arms"	—	—	—	—	Triptych
2000	"Gone"	—	—	—	—	Triptych
2000	"Walking Wounded"	—	17	—	—	Tangents: The Tea Party Collection
2001	"Lullaby"	3	—	—	—	The Interzone Mantras
2001	"Angels"	—	—	61	—	The Interzone Mantras
2001	"Soulbreaking"	3	—	—	—	The Interzone Mantras
2004	"Writing's on the Wall"	—	3	—	—	Seven Circles
2004	"Stargazer"	—	4	—	—	Seven Circles
2004	"Oceans"	—	—	—	—	Seven Circles
2014	"The Black Sea"	—	38	—	—	The Ocean at the End
2014	"The Ocean at the End"	—	—	—	—	The Ocean at the End
2019	"Black River"	—	5	—	—	Blood Moon Rising
2019	"Way Way Down"	—	35	—	—	Blood Moon Rising
2020	"Isolation"	—	—	—	—	
2020	"Everyday Is Like Sunday"	—	—	—	—	

== Music videos ==
- "Let Me Show You the Door", 1991 (Scott Souliere and Stuart Grant – filmed in Windsor and Detroit)
- "The River", 1993 (Floria Sigismondi – Toronto)
- "Save Me", 1993 (Floria Sigismondi – Toronto)
- "A Certain Slant of Light", 1994 (Floria Sigismondi – Sydney)
- "Shadows on the Mountainside", 1995 (George Vail – Paris, Ontario)
- "Fire in the Head", 1995 (Dean Karr – Los Angeles)
- "The Bazaar", 1995 (George Vail – Istanbul)
- "Sister Awake", 1996 (Curtis Wehrfritz – Toronto)
- "Temptation", 1997 (Tyran George – Toronto)
- "Babylon", 1997 (Tyran George – Toronto)
- "Release", 1998 (Ulf Buddensieck – Paris and Toronto)
- "Psychopomp", 1998 (Adam Kowalchuk – live on MuchMusic, Toronto)
- "Heaven Coming Down", 1999 (Ulf Buddensieck – Toronto)
- "The Messenger", 1999 (George Vail – Toronto)
- "Walking Wounded", 2000 (George Vail – Havana)
- "Lullaby", 2001 (Don Allan and Miroslav Bazak – Toronto)
- "Angels", 2001 (Craig Bernard – Toronto)
- "Writing's on the Wall", 2004 (Stuart Chatwood and Stephen Scott – Toronto)
- "Stargazer", 2004 (Don Allan – Toronto)
- "Oceans", 2005 (Stuart Chatwood, Jaimie Webster and Jonathon Corbiére – animated by York University students)
- "The Black Sea", 2014 (Tim Smith – Melbourne)
- "Water's On Fire", 2014
- "The Ocean At The End", 2015 (George Vale – Toronto)
- "Black River", 2018
- "Way Way Down", 2019 (Directed by Kyle Mosonyi)
- "Isolation", 2020 (Directed by Bill Blair)

== Videography ==
- Illuminations (2001), certified platinum in Canada
- Live: Intimate & Interactive (2007)
