= Live from Australia (The Tea Party album) =

Live From Australia

Live album by The Tea Party
- Released: September 15, 2012
- Recorded: Palais Theatre, Melbourne; the Hi-Fi, Melbourne; Tivoli Theatre, Brisbane; Hordern Pavilion, Sydney; Thebarton Theatre, Adelaide; Metro City, Perth
- Genre: Rock
- Length: 1:53:42
- Label: Eternal Music

The Tea Party chronology
Seven Circles (2004)	Live From Australia (2012)	The Ocean at the End (2014)

Live From Australia: The Reformation Tour 2012 (2012) is a live album by The Tea Party recorded during the Australian leg of the band's reunion tour. The album was funded and initially released September 15, 2012 through the website PledgeMusic. The album was commercially released November 23, 2012 in Australia and November 27, 2012 in the rest of the world.

The cover features the Palais Theatre in Melbourne, one of the venues where the album was recorded. Predominantly an Art Deco building, the exterior and interior include elements from Moorish architecture, which is congruous with the band's musical inspirations over their career.

== Track listing ==
Disc 1
No.	Title	Length
1.	"The River"	9:30
2.	"The Bazaar"	6:40
3.	"Lullaby"	5:46
4.	"Psychopomp"	6:50
5.	"Correspondences"	8:18
6.	"The Messenger" (Not on Vinyl Release)	5:05
7.	"Fire in the Head"	5:14
8.	"The Badger" (Not on Vinyl Release)	4:42
9.	"Shadows on the Mountainside" (Not on Vinyl Release)	4:31

Disc 2
No.	Title	Length
1.	"Sun Going Down"	11:13
2.	"Halcyon Days"	7:20
3.	"Save Me"	11:32
4.	"Heaven Coming Down" (Not on Vinyl Release)	4:45
5.	"Release"	6:17
6.	"Temptation"	5:33
7.	"Winter Solstice" (Not on Vinyl Release, Not listed on CD sleeve)	2:03
8.	"Sister Awake"	8:22

Download Only Bonus Tracks
No.	Title	Length
1.	"Overload" (Soundcheck Hordern Pavilion)	5:03
2.	"Writing's on the Wall" (HiFi Melbourne)	4:04
3.	"The River" (Hordern Pavilion)	9:13

== Personnel ==
- The Tea Party:
  - Jeff Burrows – drums, percussion, backing vocals
  - Stuart Chatwood – bass, keyboards, harmonium, mandolin, Acoustic Guitar, backing vocals
  - Jeff Martin – guitar, Acoustic Guitar, theremin, esraj, oud, bowed guitar, lead vocals
