= Tangents: The Tea Party Collection =

Greatest hits album by the Tea Party
- Released: December 12, 2000
- Recorded: 1993–2000
- Genre: Rock
- Length: 67:09
- Label: EMI Music Canada
- Producers: Jeff Martin and Ed Stasium

The Tea Party chronology
| Live at the Enmore Theatre (1999) | Tangents: The Tea Party Collection (2000) | The Interzone Mantras (2001) |

Professional ratings
Review scores
| Source | Rating |
|---|---|
| AllMusic | 4/5 stars |

Tangents is a greatest hits collection from Canadian band the Tea Party, released in 2000.

Tangents includes singles from Splendor Solis (1993), The Edges of Twilight (1995), Transmission (1997) and Triptych (1999), together with the single "Walking Wounded", B-sides recorded during the Triptych sessions and a cover of the Rolling Stones' "Paint It Black".

The DVD compilation Illuminations was released in 2001 to complement Tangents.

Stuart Chatwood (Creative Director), Antoine Moonen (Graphic Artist), James St. Laurent/Margaret Malandruccolo/Nick Sarros (Photographers) won the 2001 Juno Award for "Best Artwork".

== Commercial performance ==
Tangents debuted at number 10 on the Canadian Albums Chart, selling 14,780 copies in its first week. The album was certified platinum in Canada.

== Track listing ==
1. "Walking Wounded" – 4:37
2. "Temptation" (Transmission) – 3:25
3. "The Messenger" (Daniel Lanois cover) (Triptych) – 3:31
4. "Psychopomp" (Transmission) – 5:15
5. "Sister Awake" (The Edges of Twilight) – 5:43
6. "The Bazaar" (The Edges of Twilight) – 3:42
7. "Save Me" (remix) (Splendor Solis) – 6:36
8. "Fire in the Head" (The Edges of Twilight) – 5:06
9. "Release" (Transmission) – 4:04
10. "Heaven Coming Down" (Triptych) – 4:01
11. "The River" (remix) – 5:43 (Splendor Solis)
12. "Babylon" (Transmission) – 2:49
13. "Waiting on a Sign" – 4:21
14. "Lifeline" – 4:37
15. "Paint It Black" (The Rolling Stones cover) – 3:34

== Charts ==
=== Weekly charts ===
Weekly chart performance for Tangents: The Tea Party Collection
| Chart (2000) | Peak position |
|---|---|
| Australian Albums (ARIA) | 63 |
| Canadian Albums (Jam!) | 10 |

=== Year-end charts ===
2000 year-end chart performance for Tangents: The Tea Party Collection
| Chart (2000) | Position |
|---|---|
| Canadian Albums (Nielsen SoundScan) | 110 |

2001 year-end chart performance for Tangents: The Tea Party Collection
| Chart (2001) | Position |
|---|---|
| Canadian Albums (Nielsen SoundScan) | 195 |

== Certifications ==
Certifications for Tangents: The Tea Party Collection
| Region | Certification | Certified units/sales |
|---|---|---|
| Australia (ARIA) | Gold | 7,500^{^} |
^{^} Shipments figures based on certification alone.
