= Jeff Burrows =

Drummer and percussionist

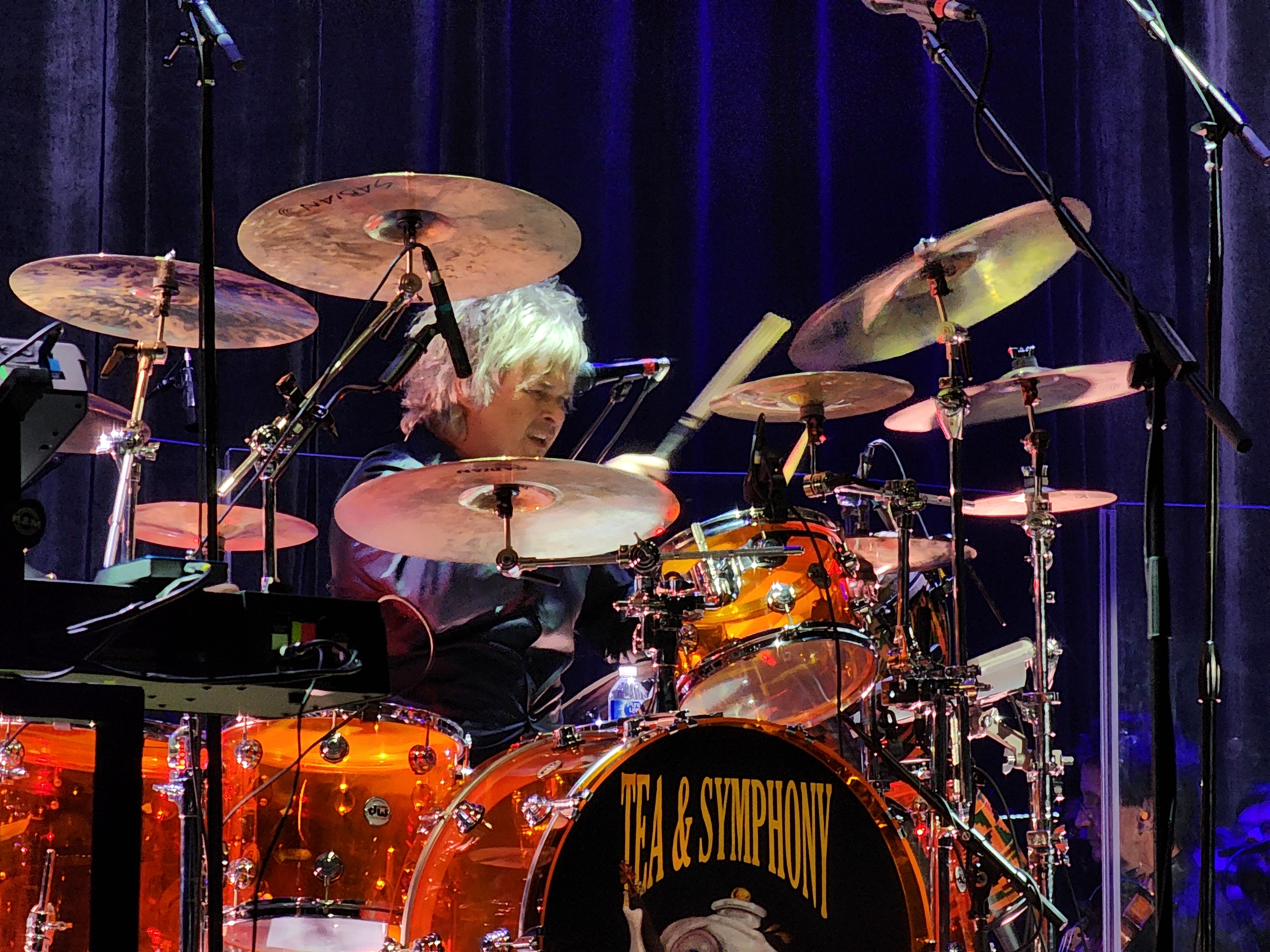
- Burrows on stage in Windsor, 2023

Background information
- Born: Jeffrey John Burrows
- Origin: Windsor, Ontario, Canada
- Genres: Rock; hard rock; world; blues; gothic; pop; soundtrack; post-punk
- Occupations: Musician; songwriter; radio personality
- Instruments: Drums; percussion; djembe; goblet drums; tabla
- Years active: 1990–present
- Label: EMI
- Member of: The Tea Party; Crash Karma; The Art Decay
- Formerly of: Big Dirty Band

Jeffrey John Burrows is the drummer and percussionist for Canadian rock band The Tea Party as well as supergroup Crash Karma.

Jeff Burrows begun drumming at eleven years of age and professionally since 1990 when he joined childhood friends Jeff Martin and Stuart Chatwood in forming The Tea Party. Burrows' style is influenced by jazz drummers including Buddy Rich, Gene Krupa and Max Roach, as well as rock drummers Neil Peart and Stewart Copeland.

== Childhood ==
Burrows was born into a musical family. Burrows' father John, a police official and lawyer in Burrows' hometown of LaSalle, Ontario, Canada, and was a drummer for Bobby Curtola in the 1960s. John Burrows also backed Motown artists while on the road and has met Berry Gordy, founder of Motown Records. John Burrows was a drumming teacher while still in his teens in his hometown of Chatham, Ontario, approximately 100 kilometres (62 mi) northeast of Windsor. Jeff Burrows' first musical experiences were on the piano, then at eleven years of age he purchased his first drum kit–an old Motown drummer's set of Ludwig drums before graduating to a set of Ludwig Rockers for his Detroit-based band Vavoom! This kit ultimately morphed into his first for The Tea Party.

== Professional career ==
=== 1990–1996 ===
Burrows signed a cymbal deal with Sabian in 1994, just after The Tea Party's first major-label album Splendor Solis was released. Burrows states that he chose Sabian because "you're getting the same quality as Zildjian but you're getting a company that's more innovative and not in a bad technological way... they still do hand-hammered cymbals."

=== 1997–2005 ===
With The Tea Party's overseas touring schedule increasing, having a drum kit available became very important. Burrows was solicited by many companies but decided on Drum Workshop, Burrows explains it is because of their "quality and durability" and "that they would supply me with a drum kit to spec in any country that we traveled to, free of charge" and that "there isn't much of a difference between any of the drums when you are endorsed because they're going to give you the high-end line no matter what, so for me it was about choosing a reputable drum company that is going to provide me with what I need.

=== 2006–present ===
After The Tea Party disbanded in 2005, Burrows joined Rush's Geddy Lee and Alex Lifeson, and other Canadian musicians, as drummer in the one-off project the Big Dirty Band, recording a cover of Sonny Curtis' I Fought the Law for the Trailer Park Boys: The Movie soundtrack. Finishing promotion of the Trailer Park Boys movie with Big Dirty Band, Burrows joined Windsor-based musician David Cyrenne in his jam band Is there a Band in the House?, playing venues near Windsor, such as "The Avalon Front". As of January 2007 Burrows was presenting the midday shift on The Rock, a radio station in Windsor. Burrows continues to record music including with independent band Johnny Hollow, on their album Beyond the Flame and, Lebanese rock band The Kordz.

In 2008 Burrows announced that he, Edwin, Mike Turner and Amir Epstein would form the band Crash Karma, recording their debut album in early 2009.

In 2011, Burrows reunited with his Tea Party bandmates and the trio embarked on a Canadian summer tour.

== Equipment ==
=== Drums ===
- Ludwig Drums (1990–1994)
- Gretsch drums (1995–1996)
- DW (1997–present)
  - Two kits: A satin oil finish with gold plated hardware and a tobacco burst finish with chrome hardware. 6-ply maple.
  - DW Kick: 24x16"
  - Toms
    - 12x12" tenor
    - 14x14" and 18x16" floor toms
  - Snares
    - DW 13x5"
    - Antique Ludwigs
    - Wood snares
    - Metal snares
  - Hardware: All hardware is DW except kick pedal and hi-hat stand which are Yamaha

=== Cymbals ===
- Sabian
  - Hi Hats: 13" AAX
  - Splash: 10", 12" AAX Metal
  - Crash: Various AAXplosion
  - Ride: 20" AA El Sabors

=== Heads ===
- Remo Drumheads
  - Snares: Coated Emperor
  - Kick: Pinstripe
  - Tom Toms: Clear Emperor

=== Sticks ===
- Signature Pro-Mark 707 drumsticks (Japan Oak) with stick wrap

== Philanthropy ==
=== The White Ribbon Campaign ===
Burrows' first major charitable exercise was with The Tea Party. The band donated all proceeds from the sale of the 1998 CD single "Release", to the White Ribbon Campaign; an organization of men working to end men's violence against women. Burrows, together with The Tea Party participated in the annual White Ribbon Concert, organised by Jeff Martin, from 1998 to 2004. Burrows has also participated in The White Ribbon Campaign's Ivory DadWalk.

=== Transition to Betterness ===
Burrows has raised awareness and funds for Transition to Betterness, a charity based in Windsor, Ontario, which aims to provide a comfortable and compassionate hospital setting to cancer patients and their families within the Windsor and Essex County community. As of January 2007 Burrows' concerts, events and eBay Canada auctions had raised over $300,000 for Transition to Betterness. May 2007 saw Burrows complete a 24-hour drum marathon at the Chubby Pickle in Windsor.

=== Motorcycle Ride for Dad ===
In 2006, Burrows participated in the Windsor, Ontario leg of Motorcycle Ride for Dad, raising funds for prostate cancer research and education.

Burrows utilises social networking website Facebook to promote his charity events, emphasising in particular the work of Transition to Betterness.

== Discography ==
=== The Tea Party ===
- The Tea Party (1991)
- Capitol Records demo (1992)
- Splendor Solis (1993)
- The Edges of Twilight (1995)
- Alhambra (1996) (Enhanced CD)
- Transmission (1997)
- Triptych (1999)
- Live at the Enmore Theatre (1999)
- Tangents: The Tea Party Collection (2000) (compilation)
- The Interzone Mantras (2001)
- Seven Circles (2004)
- The Ocean at the End (2014)
- Tx 20 (2017)
- Black River EP (2019)

=== Crash Karma ===
- Crash Karma (2010)
- Rock Musique Deluxe (2013)

=== Big Dirty Band ===
- Trailer Park Boys: The Movie (2006) (soundtrack)

=== As guest ===
- Johnny Hollow's Dirty Hands album (2008) (drums)

== Videogame soundtracks ==
- Road Rash 3D (1998/EA)
- NHL 2002 (2002/EA)
- Prince of Persia: Warrior Within (2004/Ubisoft)

== Career highlights ==
- Albums released: 8 on EMI Music Canada, 1 on Eternal Discs
- Albums sold: 1.6 million records sold with The Tea Party
- Largest crowd (multi-band bill support): 490,000 people - SARS relief concert, Toronto, Ontario
- Largest crowd (multi-band bill headline): 42,000 people - Edgefest, Park Place, Ontario
- Largest crowd (Tea Party solo show headline): 5,800 people - Hordern Pavilion, Sydney, Australia
- Touring: worldwide touring included Canada 21 times, Australia 12 times, Europe 9 times, USA 8 times
- Notable Support slots and tours: Page and Plant, Ozzy Osbourne, Nine Inch Nails, New Order, Ramones, Lou Reed, Metallica, Soundgarden, Big Day Out, Edgefest, M-One Festival, Alternative Nation, SARS relief concert
- Videos: 21 videos as The Tea Party, 1 video as Big Dirty Band
- Awards (band): 6 MuchMusic Video Awards
- Nominations (band): 14 Juno Award nominations, 21 Much Music Award Nominations
