= Live: Intimate & Interactive =

Video by The Tea Party
- Released: 17 October 2007
- Recorded: 20 May 1998 & 20 November 2000
- Genre: Rock
- Length: 91:41
- Label: Linus Entertainment
- Director: David Russell
- Producer: David Russell

The Tea Party chronology
Illuminations (2001)	Live: Intimate & Interactive (2007)

Live: Intimate & Interactive is a 2007 single digital versatile disc (DVD) by the Canadian rock band The Tea Party. The live music DVD is the only official live video release, shot in the MuchMusic CHUM-City Building in Toronto, during their Intimate and Interactive performance in May 1998, coupled with a performance from 20 November 2000.

== Track listing ==
=== Intimate and Interactive (1998) ===
- "Army Ants"
- "Fire in the Head"
- "Release"
- "Transmission"
- "Save Me"
- "Winter Solstice / Sister Awake"
- "Temptation"
- "Psychopomp"

=== Live @ Much (2000) ===
- "Temptation"
- "The Messenger"
- "Sister Awake"
