= Live at the Corner Hotel =

Live album by Jeff Martin
- Released: February 28, 2008
- Recorded: February 19, 2008, The Corner Hotel, Melbourne, Australia
- Genre: Rock
- Label: Artist Controlled Bootlegs and New Found Frequency
- Producer: Jeff Martin, Peter Frawley, and Reggie Ray

Jeff Martin chronology
Live at the Enmore Theatre (2007)	Live at the Corner Hotel (2008)

Live at the Corner Hotel (2008) is a live album by Canadian singer/songwriter Jeff Martin. The album is a complete recording of a live performance with Irish drummer Wayne Sheehy. The show features the song A Line In The Sand from the debut self-titled album by Martin's new band The Armada.

== Track listing ==
1. "The Bazaar" (The Tea Party)
2. "Requiem" (The Tea Party)
3. "I Love You" (Daniel Lanois cover)
4. "The Messenger" (Daniel Lanois)
5. "A Line In The Sand" (first single from new album)
6. "Coming Home" (The Tea Party)
7. "Release" (The Tea Party)
8. "Lament"
9. "The Kingdom"
10. "Black Snake Blues"
11. "Sister Awake" (The Tea Party)

Note: The CD label lists 12 tracks with "Winter Solstice" and "Lament" getting their own track numbers. However, once the album was put together they had gone over the time limit and needed to cut a track from the album. Jeff chose to cut Winter Solstice.

== Credits ==
- Jeff Martin – vocals and guitar
- Wayne Sheehy – drums and percussion
- Recorded and mixed by Salt Location Recordings
- Produced by Jeff Martin, Peter Frawley, and Reggie Ray
- Mixed by Jeff Martin and Sam Lowe
- Engineered by Matt Muir and Gene Shev
- Live sound Engineer Trevor J Cronin, Sound around Australia
- System technicians: Sean McVitty and Yury Kogan
- Artwork by Marco Holtappel
- Photos by Karim De Groot
