= Walking Wounded (The Tea Party song) =

Single by The Tea Party

from the album Tangents: The Tea Party Collection
- Released: November 2000
- Recorded: Studios Piccolo (Montreal) / Studio Morin Heights
- Genre: Rock
- Length: 4:38
- Label: EMI Music Canada
- Songwriter: The Tea Party
- Producer: Jeff Martin

The Tea Party singles chronology
"Gone" (2000)	"Walking Wounded" (2000)	"Lullaby" (2001)

"Walking Wounded" is a song by Canadian rock band The Tea Party. It was released as a promotional single in Canada. The music video was shot in Havana.

"Walking Wounded" is a complex composition and features a choral, and string quartet (conducted by Marc Ouellette), it was written when the band were penning material for The Interzone Mantras. The song used 72 recording tracks. In an interview Jeff Martin claimed the song was about "..a time in his life that [he is] glad that it is over."

== Charts ==
Chart (2000)	Peak position
Canada Rock/Alternative (RPM)	17

== Track listing ==
1. "Walking Wounded"
