= Heaven Coming Down =

- Commercial CD Single, Australia

Single by The Tea Party

from the album Triptych
- A-side: "Heaven Coming Down", "Save Me", "Fire in the Head", "Temptation"
- Released: May 1999
- Studio: Studio Morin Heights (Morin Heights), White Crow Audio (Burlington, Vermont), A&M Studios (Los Angeles) and Alkemical Studios (Montreal)
- Genre: Alternative rock
- Length: 4:01
- Label: EMI Music Canada
- Songwriter: The Tea Party
- Producers: Jeff Martin and Ed Stasium

The Tea Party singles chronology
| "Gyroscope" (1998) | "Heaven Coming Down" (1999) | "The Messenger" (1999) |

"Heaven Coming Down" is a song by Canadian rock band The Tea Party. It was released as a single in Australia and France and as a promotional single in Canada. "Heaven Coming Down" is The Tea Party's sole number-one single in Canada, reaching the top of the RPM Rock Report. The song was nominated for "Best Single" at the 2000 Juno Awards.

== Content ==
It is a rock composition of heavy drums, chiming 12-string Rickenbacker guitar with bass and keyboard accompaniment.

== Track listing ==
1. "Heaven Coming Down"
2. "Save Me"
3. "Fire in the Head"
4. "Temptation"

== Charts ==
Chart performance for "Heaven Coming Down"
| Chart (1999) | Peak position |
|---|---|
| Australia (ARIA) | 83 |
| Canada Rock Report (RPM) | 1 |
| Canada Top Singles (RPM) | 20 |
