= A Certain Slant of Light (song) =

- Commercial CD single, Australia

Single by The Tea Party

from the album Splendor Solis
- A-side: "A Certain Slant of Light (edit)", "Winter Solstice", "Save Me"
- B-side: "Watching what the Rain Blows in"
- Released: April 1994
- Recorded: White Crow Audio (Burlington, Vermont)
- Label: EMI Music Canada
- Songwriter: The Tea Party
- Producer: Jeff Martin

The Tea Party singles chronology
| "Save Me" (1993) | "A Certain Slant of Light" (1994) | "In This Time" (1994) |

"A Certain Slant of Light" is a song by Canadian rock band The Tea Party. It was released as a single in Australia, where it peaked at #60 on the ARIA singles chart in May 1994, and as a promotional single in Canada. The music video was shot in the Sydney suburbs of Kurnell and Kings Cross, was directed by Floria Sigismondi, and features some of The Tea Party's Australian tour management personnel.

"A Certain Slant of Light" is a standard three-piece rock composition with lyrics referencing drug addiction. Its title is derived from the title of a poem by Emily Dickinson, "There's a certain Slant of light".

The music video for this single is notable as Floria Sigismondi's directorial debut.

== Track listing ==
1. "A Certain Slant of Light" (edit)
2. "Winter Solstice"
3. "Save Me"
4. "Watching what the Rain Blows in"

== Charts ==
Chart performance for "A Certain Slant of Light"
| Chart (1994) | Peak position |
|---|---|
| Australia (ARIA) | 60 |
