= Blood Moon Rising =

Studio album by The Tea Party
- Released: 2021
- Studios: Riverhouse Music, Armoury Studios
- Length: 40:00
- Labels: Inside Out Music, Sony Music
- Producer: Jeff Martin

The Tea Party chronology
Ocean at the End (2014)	Blood Moon Rising (2021)

Blood Moon Rising is Canadian Rock band The Tea Party's ninth studio album.

== Recording ==
The album was recorded in Canada and Australia. In a press release for the single “Hole in my Heart,” the band wrote, “When the band got together in late 2019 to work on new material there was a conscious effort to return to the guitar based music that launched the band's career. Big guitar riffs, big drums and big bass lines. The original idea for this song started way back in 2003 but it was only during the writing process for our new record that all the pieces finally came together. We had a blast recording this and we hope you enjoy it as much as we do.”

== Reception ==
In an 8/10 Review for Invicta Magazine, Gavin Brown wrote about how the Tea Party's “uplifting brand of rock mixes psychedelic, prog rock, Middle Eastern and blues influences and it is all wrapped up in a triumphant classic rock style... The band themselves are on top form throughout with singer/guitarist Jeff Martin's powerful voice at full power on this album... The Tea Party's rhythm section that consists of Stuart Chatwood on bass (as well as playing keyboards) and drummer Jeff Burrows ably complement Martin and create a formidable groove throughout.”

In Distorted Sound Magazine, Jazmin L'Amy wrote, “Canada-based rock band The Tea Party have spent their three-decades long career experimenting and combining unique musical sounds from each corner of the world over nine major label releases. Assessing the relationships between progressive rock, blues, industrial, and even Middle Eastern influences, their 30 years of research has culminated in the release of their latest offering Blood Moon Rising.”

== Track listing ==
1. "Black River" – 2:55
2. "Way Way Down" – 2:52
3. "Sunshower" – 3:58
4. "So Careless" – 3:22
5. "Our Love" – 4:39
6. "Hole in My Heart" – 3:22
7. "Shelter" – 3:54
8. "Summertime" – 2:57
9. "Out on the Tiles (Jimmy Page, John Bonham, Robert Plant) – 3:36
10. "The Beautiful" – 4:35
11. "Blood Moon Rising (Wattsy's Song)" – 4:20

Bonus tracks

12. "Isolation" (Bernard Sumner, Peter Hook, Stephen Morris, Ian Curtis) – 3:56
13. "Everyday Is Like Sunday (Morrissey, Stephen Street) – 3:34
14. "Way Way Down" (Live Recording) – 3:15

== Personnel ==
- Jeff Burrows – drums, percussion, backing vocals
- Stuart Chatwood – bass, keyboards, backing vocals
- Jeff Martin – guitar, lead vocals, producer
- Jamie Ashforth – harmonica (track 2)
