= Live at the Enmore Theatre =

Live at the Enmore Theatre may refer to:

- Live at the Enmore Theatre, a 1999 EP by The Tea Party
- Live at the Enmore Theatre, a 2007 video album by Jeff Martin
