= The River (The Tea Party song) =

- Commercial CD Single, UK

Single by The Tea Party

from the album Splendor Solis
- A-side: "The River (radio edit)", "The River (album)", "Winter Solstice"
- B-side: "Watching What the Rain Blows In"
- Released: 1993
- Recorded: White Crow Audio (Burlington, Vermont)
- Length: 5:42
- Label: Chrysalis/EMI
- Songwriter(s): The Tea Party
- Producer(s): Jeff Martin

The Tea Party singles chronology
| "The River" (1993) | "Save Me" (1993) |

"The River" is the debut single by Canadian rock band the Tea Party. It was released as a single in Australia and the UK, where it reached No. 79 on the UK Singles Chart, No. 99 in Australia, and was a promotional single in Canada and the US.

The music video was shot in Toronto, directed by Floria Sigismondi and features a cameo by Roy Harper. The video also features footage of the Old Mill event venue in Toronto.

"The River" is a standard three-piece rock composition with a lot of Wah-wah pedal. An acoustic version with tar (lute), santur and drums was recorded in August 1995 at Studio Morin Heights (Morin Heights) for Alhambra but appears as a B-side on the "Temptation" single and the European Triptych Special Tour Edition 2000 album.

== Track listing ==
1. "The River (radio edit)"
2. "The River (album)"
3. "Winter Solstice"
4. "Watching What the Rain Blows in"

== Charts ==
Chart performance for "The River"
| Chart (1994) | Peak position |
|---|---|
| Australia (ARIA) | 99 |
| UK Singles (OCC) | 79 |
