= Stuart Chatwood =

Canadian musician (born 1969)

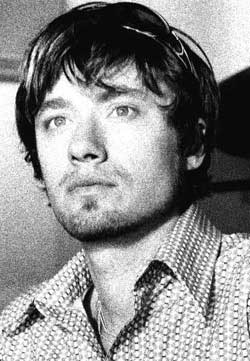

Background information
- Born: October 22, 1969 (age 56); Fleetwood, Lancashire, England
- Origin: Windsor, Ontario, Canada
- Genres: Rock, hard rock, world, blues, new wave, gothic, post-punk, industrial, pop, art rock
- Occupations: Musician, composer, songwriter
- Instruments: Bass, guitar, keyboards, harmonium, percussion, mandolin, tambura, cello, lap steel guitar, bass pedals
- Years active: 1990–present
- Labels: EMI, Ubisoft
- Website: stuartchatwood.com

Stuart Chatwood (born 22 October 1969 in Fleetwood, Lancashire, England) is a Canadian musician, best known as the bass guitar and keyboard player for the rock band The Tea Party. The Tea Party are known for fusing together musical styles of both the Eastern and Western worlds, in what they call "Moroccan roll". In 2001, Chatwood won a Juno Award for the best artwork for a Tea Party album.

Chatwood is also a composer of video game soundtracks. He composed music that has appeared on the soundtracks for eight Prince of Persia games developed by Ubisoft Montreal: Prince of Persia: The Sands of Time (2003), Warrior Within (2004), The Two Thrones (2005), Battles of Prince of Persia (2005), Revelations (2005), Rival Swords (2007), Prince of Persia (2008), and The Fallen King (2008). The series has been very successful, selling in excess of ten million copies worldwide. He also composed the soundtrack for Darkest Dungeon (2016) and its sequel Darkest Dungeon II.

== Biography ==
Chatwood grew up in Windsor, Ontario with other members of The Tea Party, although his first band was called The Stickmen.

== Discography with The Tea Party ==
- The Tea Party (1991)
- Capitol Records demo (1992)
- Splendor Solis (1993)
- The Edges of Twilight (1995)
- Alhambra (1996) (Enhanced CD)
- Transmission (1997)
- Triptych (1999)
- Live at the Enmore Theatre (1999)
- Tangents: The Tea Party Collection (2000) (compilation)
- Illuminations (2001) (DVD compilation)
- The Interzone Mantras (2001)
- Seven Circles (2004)
- Live from Australia (2013)
- The Ocean at the End (2014)
- Tx 20 (2017)
- Black River EP (2019)

== Movie soundtracks with The Tea Party ==
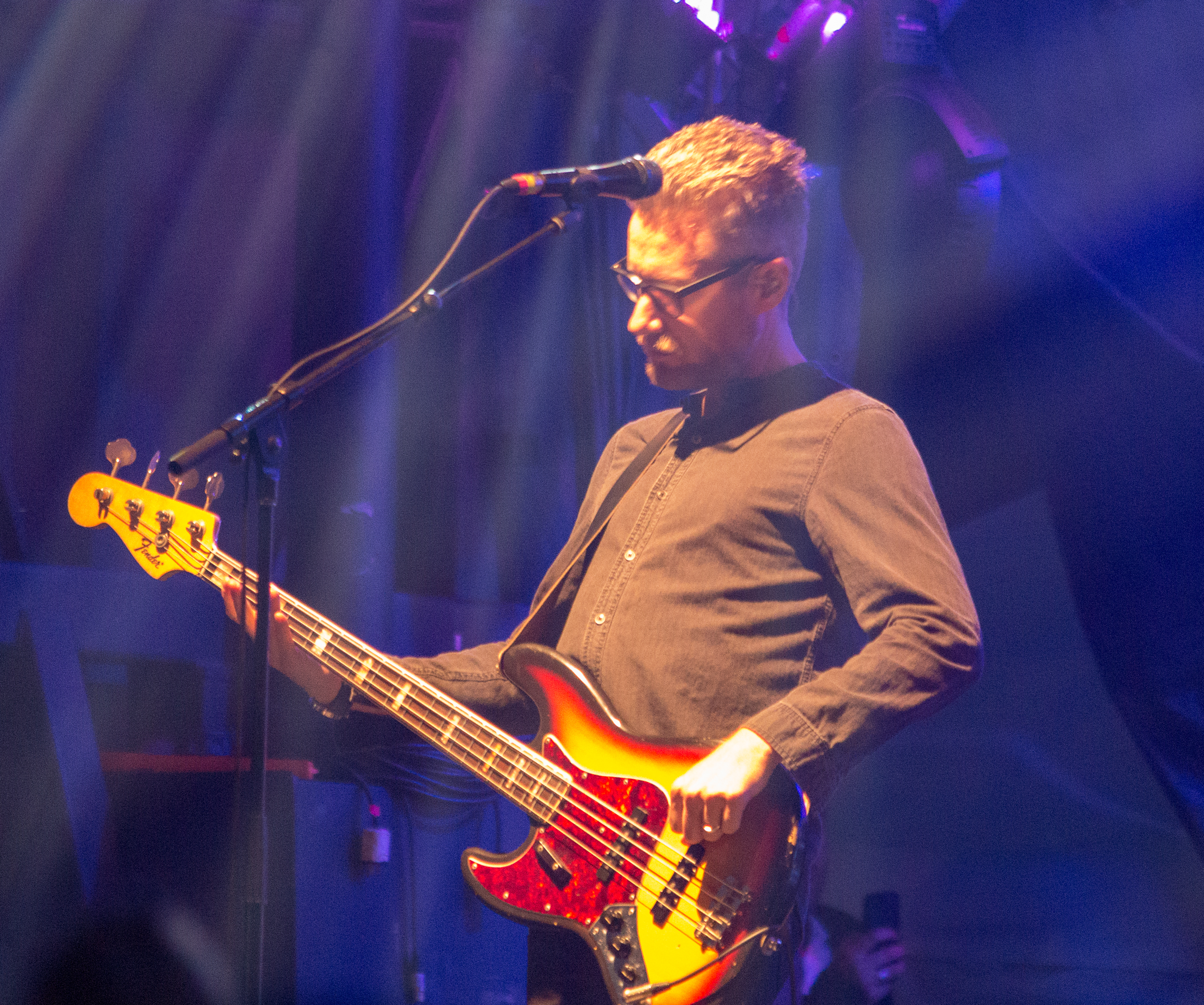
Stuart Chatwood performing with the Tea Party at the Sound of Music Festival in Burlington, ON

- Lilly (1993)

== Video directing ==
- "Writing's on the Wall" (2004)
- "Oceans" (2005)

== Videogame soundtracks ==
- Road Rash 3D (1998, EA)
- NHL 2002 (2001, EA)
- Prince of Persia: The Sands of Time (2003, Ubisoft)
- Prince of Persia: Warrior Within (2004, Ubisoft) with Inon Zur
- Prince of Persia: The Two Thrones (2005, Ubisoft) with Inon Zur
- Battles of Prince of Persia (2005, Ubisoft)
- Prince of Persia: Revelations (2005, Ubisoft) with Inon Zur
- Prince of Persia: Rival Swords (2007, Ubisoft) with Inon Zur
- Prince of Persia: The Fallen King (2008, Ubisoft) with Inon Zur
- Prince of Persia (2008, Ubisoft) with Inon Zur
- Darkest Dungeon (2016, Red Hook Studios)
- Darkest Dungeon II (2023, Red Hook Studios)

== Additional projects ==
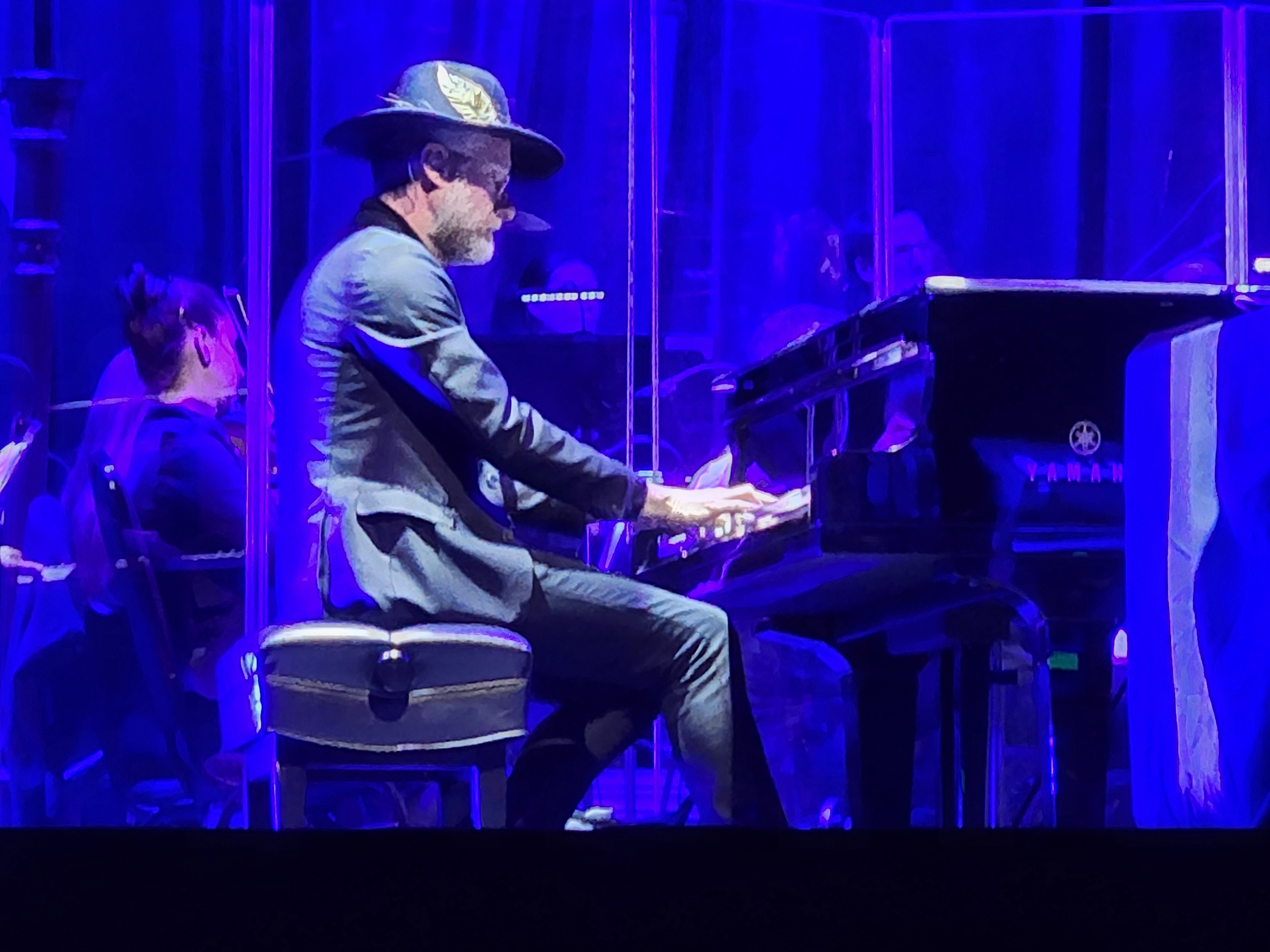
Chatwood on the grand piano, 2023

=== Currently in production ===
- 'Uncommon Folk', a New York City-based project has been Chatwood's main focus (other than The Tea Party) since 2006. The goal of the project is to raise awareness about misophonia (see also Sensory Processing Disorder). The music has a therapeutic character, in the style of ambient/folk songs, with a focus on down regulation and relaxation. Numerous vocalists have contributed to the recording of about 26 songs over 11 years for this project, including Glen Campbell, Mavis Staples, Jacob Dylan, Robin Zander and the Blind Boys of Alabama. Vocals and strings were recorded for this project in New York City, The Hamptons, Los Angeles, Chicago, Phoenix, Wales, Toronto and Vancouver. The first single "This Land is Your Land" featuring Glen Campbell was released in August 2017. The Mavis Staples song as well as the full album are being prepared for expected release in 2018.
- 'Unnamed Project' with Toronto-based bilingual singer Tecla Burey. In November 2017 this project was considered a work in progress with an open ended completion and distribution date.

=== Completed projects with undetermined release dates ===
- 'Songs from the Chapel' with Jeff Burrows of The Tea Party, Crash Karma and The S'Aints, Todd Kerns of Slash/The Age of Electric and Ryan Dahle of Limblifter/The Age of Electric. The collaboration produced about 20 ideas and eight or nine recorded songs. The project stalled but Ryan Dahle was responsible for mixing the tracks and they may yet emerge.
- 'Art Decay' with Toronto vocalist Kent Leggatt and Jeff Burrows, reportedly influenced by the sounds of both Nick Cave and Echo and the Bunnymen. An EP may be released in 2018.

== Other information ==
- Chatwood was once a contender to replace the bass player of the Smashing Pumpkins early in the temporary post-Tea Party era (2005 - 2011). He was on a list of five or six male bass players being considered
- During the hiatus of The Tea Party, Chatwood was in talks with Craig Ross of Lenny Kravitz's band about forming a group with Jeff Burrows on drums and Jimmy Gnecco on vocals. After two to three months of chatting and meeting Craig backstage at an Aerosmith/Lenny Kravitz show there was chemistry, but ultimately there was an incompatibility of scheduling and the project did not move forward
- During his childhood, Chatwood was friends with Canadian electronic musician and DJ Richard "Richie" Hawtin. They shared a love of 8-bit computer systems such as Commodore 64 and Atari

== Career awards ==
- 2001: Juno Award for "Best Album Design" of the Tangents: The Tea Party Collection.
