= Intimate and Live =

Intimate and Live may refer to:

- Intimate and Live (tour), a concert tour of Kylie Minogue
  - Intimate and Live (album), an album from the tour

== See also ==
- Live: Intimate & Interactive, a DVD by the Tea Party
- Live and Intimate, a concert film on the Bloc Party album Intimacy
