= The Lavender Hill Mob (disambiguation) =

The Lavender Hill Mob is a 1951 comedy film starring Alec Guinness.

The Lavender Hill Mob or Lavender Hill Mob may also refer to:

- Lavender Hill Mob (band), Canadian rock band
- Lavender Hill Mob (gay activist group), 1980s American militant gay rights activist group
- The Lavender Hill Mob (play), play based on the 1951 film
