= Le Studio =

Former recording studio in Morin-Heights, Quebec

Coordinates: 45°52′34″N 74°16′11″W

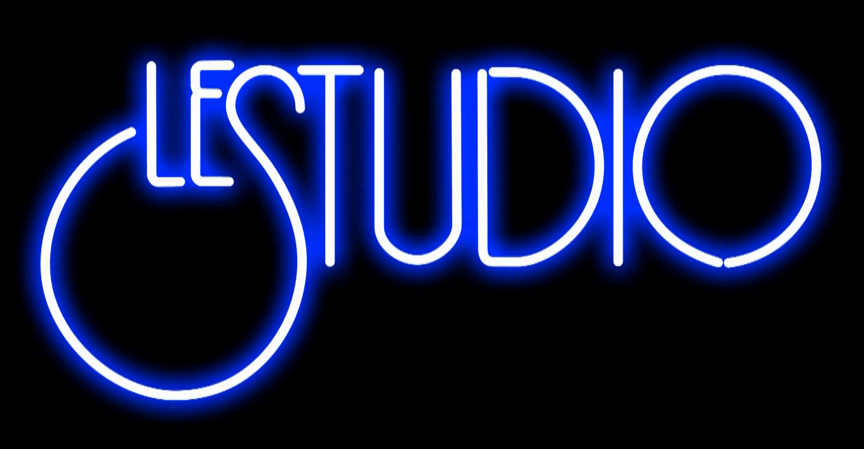
- Interactive map of Le Studio
- Address: Morin-Heights, Quebec, Canada

Construction
- Opened: 1972
- Closed: 2003
- Demolished: 2020

Le Studio (later renamed Studio Morin Heights) was a residential recording studio in the Laurentian Mountains near the town of Morin-Heights, Quebec, Canada. Built in 1972 by recording engineer and producer André Perry, along with his wife Yaël Brandeis and Nick Blagona, the studio was seen as one of the top recording venues in North America during its existence, renowned for its retreat-like location and state-of-the-art equipment. Numerous notable Canadian and international artists recorded and stayed at Le Studio, including Rush (most notably), The Police, David Bowie, the Bee Gees, Cat Stevens, April Wine, Nazareth, Queensrÿche, and Celine Dion. Perry described the facility as "like the United Nations. I had people from London, New York, Quebec, all over the world."

Originally having used a Trident A Range recording console, Le Studio then became one of the earliest studios to install a Solid State Logic SSL 4000B mixing console and RADAR digital recording equipment. Perry sold the studio to new owners in 1988, and it remained active for fifteen years before its closure in 2003, after which it was neglected and fell into disrepair. On 11 August 2017, the building was partially destroyed by "a suspicious" fire. What remained of the complex was demolished in 2020, and in 2021, the entire property was cleared and put up for sale for $850,000.

== History ==
André Perry gained fame as a recording engineer working for John Lennon, and in the early 1970s was looking to expand his studio, built in a downtown Montreal church. He moved to the remote town of Morin-Heights, where he owned a lake, and built his studio there, with his wife Yaël Brandeis. The idea was to give recording artists a venue where they could record and live in a creative atmosphere, near the Laurentian Mountains. The Bee Gees, who recorded portions of Children of the World (1976) at Le Studio, stayed for five months. Initially it included a guesthouse about a half-hour's drive away, but it was accidentally burned down by Roy Thomas Baker and Ian Hunter, according to studio designer and engineer Nick Blagona. A new house across the lake was later acquired and expanded.

By the early 1980s, Le Studio gained a reputation as a premier recording venue after Rush, The Police, David Bowie, and April Wine recorded albums there. The studio was particularly associated with Rush, even being called their own "Abbey Road"; the band made seven studio albums there between 1979 and 1993 during "the peak and the end" of the Terry Brown era, the albums being Permanent Waves (1980), Moving Pictures (1981), Signals (1982), Grace Under Pressure (1984), Presto (1989), Roll the Bones (1991), and Counterparts (1993).

In late 1980, Le Studio had installed a state-of-the-art computerized Solid State Logic SL 4000 E Master Studio System, later upgraded for 48-track capability (two synchronized 24-track tape machines). Other upgrades to the studio included the expansion into video work, with the addition of video post-production and editing facilities. By August 1981, the studio had acquired a JVC BP-90 digital 2-track processor at the choice of André Perry, producer Terry Brown, and then-Le Studio staff engineers Paul Northfield and Nick Blagona. It was supposedly first used on a double live LP that The Police were mixing at Le Studio that same month, although the André Perry website cites their album Synchronicity (1983) as being the one.

In 1986, Le Studio issued stock on the Montreal Exchange looking to acquire funding for building a second studio, with audio and video capabilities in Washington, D.C. 1.1 million shares valued at $3.50 were sold. Perry and Brandeis retained majority interests. They spent $500,000 on a Quantel Mirage digital video effects unit, hoping to install more equipment to allow the recording of sound effects and film music, as well as a Synclavier room.

In 1988, Perry and Brandeis sold the studio, and Perry retired in the early 1990s. The studio, by then called Studio Morin Heights, was acquired in 1993 by L'Equipe Spectra, an entertainment company best known for the Montreal International Jazz Festival which also had a number of local artists on record. Rush and other bands continued to do their tracking there. The new owners also built an expansion to the building, called the "Far Side", which featured a digital RADAR audio recorder and video production suite, as well as an expanded recreational and living space which allowed local bands with modest budgets to benefit from the amenities.

The studio was shut down in March 2003 by Spectra. The 233-acre (0.94 km^{2}) site was listed for sale in July 2007, with an asking price of Can$2.45 million. The property remained for sale until 2009, when the land was purchased with the intent to convert the area to a retreat and spa, but this never eventuated. The complex remained unoccupied and gradually deteriorated, and was broken into and vandalized many times. A US $2.4 million kickstarter campaign was begun in 2015 to rebuild Le Studio, but only $4,000 was pledged.

On 11 August 2017, the building was partially destroyed by a fire in a suspected case of arson. The residential area of the studio was completely destroyed, while the original recording area still stood but was severely damaged. Geddy Lee of Rush told the CBC, "it was truly a part of the great Canadian landscape... and literally a home away from home for us. It will always have a special place in our hearts." In October 2020, the remaining parts of the building were demolished, and the now empty site was cleared and put on the market in 2021.

Other notable music artists to have recorded at Le Studio include Asia, Barenaked Ladies, Bryan Adams, Cat Stevens, Chicago, Keith Richards, Kim Mitchell, Nazareth, Queensrÿche, Rainbow, Sarah McLachlan, and Sting. In January 1992, Celine Dion recorded "With This Tear", a song written by Prince and produced by Walter Afanasieff for her self-titled album Celine Dion.

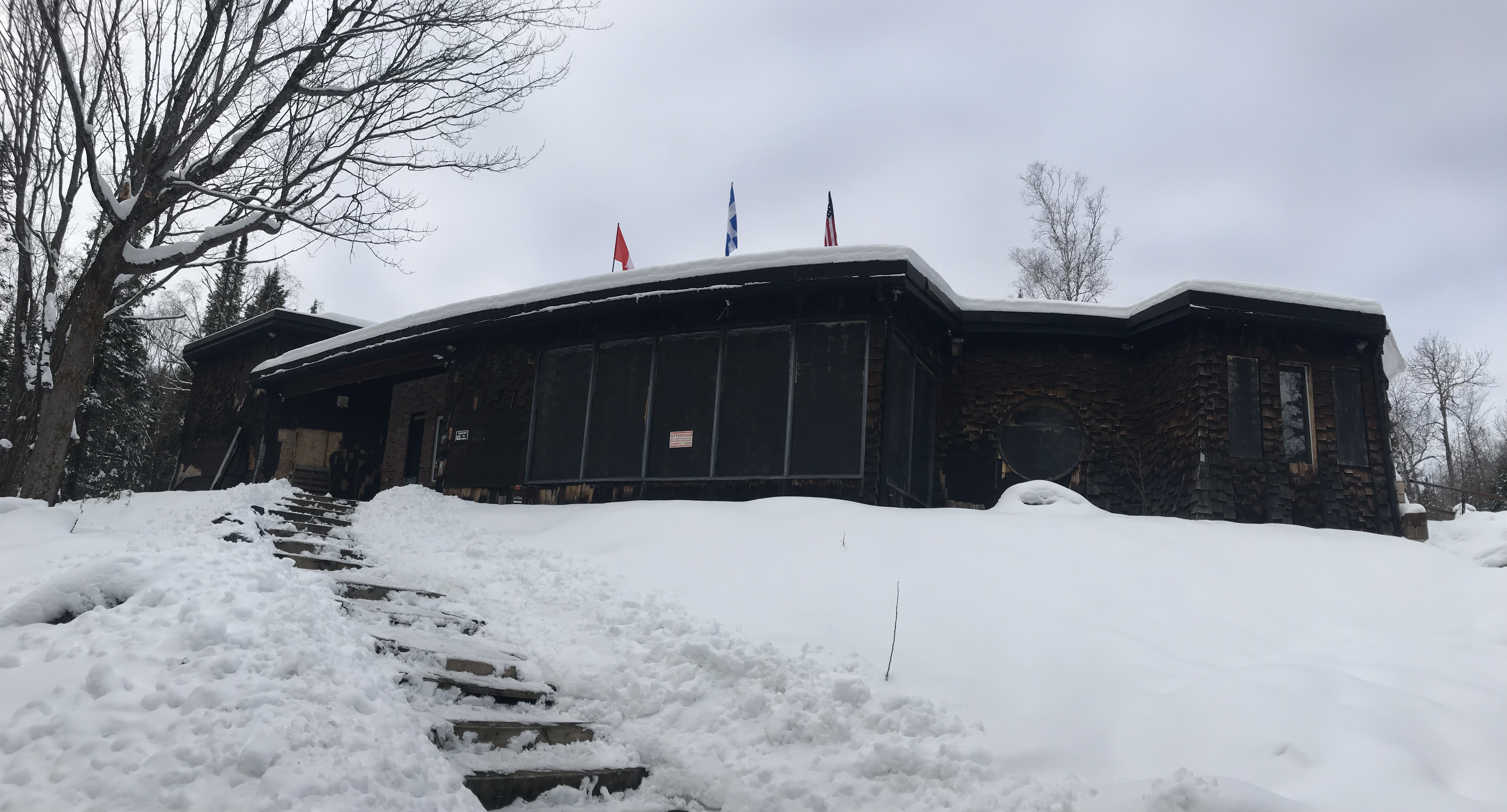
Outside view of Le Studio in December 2018. The recording area still stood after the 2017 fire that destroyed the residential area

Some of Le Studio's engineering staff over the years included Nick Blagona, Paul Northfield, Ed Stasium, William Le Gallee Mann, Claude Demers, Leanne Unger, Frank Opolko, Glen Robinson, Robert DiGioia, Paul Milner, Simon Pressey, Jacques Deveau, and George Pelekoudis.

The studio and grounds are featured in the music videos of the recording sessions of the Rush songs "Tom Sawyer", "Limelight", and "Vital Signs", as well as in April Wine's music video for "I Like to Rock". Also, an episode of the show Popular Mechanics for Kids was taped there, with actress Elisha Cuthbert demonstrating recording and mixing techniques.

== Albums and songs recorded at Le Studio ==
Title	Artist	Year
Dans l'air des mots	Gaston Rochon	1974
J'ai vu le loup le renard le lion	Felix Leclerc, Gilles Vigneault, and Robert Charlebois	1974
Lady Marmalade	Nanette Workman	1975
Numbers	Cat Stevens	1975
Close Enough for Rock 'n' Roll	Nazareth	1976
Nanette Workman	Nanette Workman	1976
1 fois 5 (enregistrement devant public)	Robert Charlebois, Yvon Deschamps, Jean-Pierre Ferland, Claude Léveillée, and Gilles Vigneault	1976
Morin Heights (named for the location of the studio)	Pilot	1976
Children of the World	Bee Gees	1976
Play 'n' the Game	Nazareth	1976
Fountains of Light	Starcastle	1977
Lavender Hill Mob	Lavender Hill Mob	1977
Izitso	Cat Stevens	1977
Vladimir Vysotsky	Vladimir Vysotsky	1977
Expect No Mercy	Nazareth	1977
Saturday Night Fever (soundtrack) (mixing)	Bee Gees and various artists	1977
Street of Dreams	Lavender Hill Mob	1978
First Glance	April Wine	1978
"Well, Well," Said the Rocking Chair	Dean Friedman	1978
Safety in Numbers	Crack the Sky	1978
Back to Earth	Cat Stevens	1978
Under Heaven Over Hell	Streetheart	1979
Chicago 13	Chicago	1979
Harder ... Faster	April Wine	1979
I Want You	Wilson Pickett	1979
Permanent Waves	Rush	1980
Roberta Flack Featuring Donny Hathaway	Roberta Flack	1980
Quicksand Shoes	Streetheart	1980
Chaude	Nanette Workman	1980
Moving Pictures	Rush	1981
You Want It You Got It	Bryan Adams	1981
Thrillz	Walter Zwol & The Rage	1981
Ghost in the Machine (overdubs and mixing): "Every Little Thing She Does Is Magic" single	The Police	1981
Exit... Stage Left (live album editing and mixing)	Rush	1981
Straight Between the Eyes	Rainbow	1982
Love Over and Over	Kate & Anna McGarrigle	1982
Power Play	April Wine	1982
Signals	Rush	1982
Cuts Like a Knife	Bryan Adams	1983
In the Red	Fist	1983
Synchronicity (overdubs and mixing)	The Police	1983
Alpha	Asia	1983
Animal Grace	April Wine	1984
Grace Under Pressure	Rush	1984
Tonight	David Bowie	1984
Boy in the Box	Corey Hart	1985
The Dream of the Blue Turtles (overdubs and mixing)	Sting	1985
Friction	Coney Hatch	1985
Fields of Fire	Corey Hart	1985
The Thin Red Line	Glass Tiger	1986
Shakin' Like a Human Being	Kim Mitchell	1986
Between the Earth & Sky	Luba	1986
Electric: "Electric Ocean" song only, recorded in 1985	The Cult	1987
Paradox	Paradox	1988
Diamond Sun	Glass Tiger	1988
Operation: Mindcrime	Queensrÿche	1988
Secrets of the Alibi	The Northern Pikes	1988
Talk Is Cheap	Keith Richards	1988
Sur Le Chemin des Incendies	Paul Piché	1988
No Respect	Vain	1989
Presto	Rush	1989
Big Houses	Eight Seconds	1990
Hell to Pay	The Jeff Healey Band	1990
When Up Turns To Down	Doughboys	1991
Roll the Bones	Rush	1991
Celine Dion: "With This Tear" song only	Celine Dion	1992
Gordon	Barenaked Ladies	1992
...But You Can Call Me Larry	Lawrence Gowan	1993
Counterparts	Rush	1993
Fumbling Towards Ecstasy	Sarah McLachlan	1993
Risque	Terez Montcalm	1994
Circle of One	Julie Masse	1994
Alhambra	The Tea Party	1996
Scenery and Fish	I Mother Earth	1996
Matapédia	Kate & Anna McGarrigle	1996
Creature	Moist	1996
No Worries	Reset	1997
Transmission	The Tea Party	1997
These Are Special Times	Celine Dion	1998
Triptych	The Tea Party	1999
Blue Green Orange	I Mother Earth	1999
Nickels for Your Nightmares	Headstones	2000
Since August	Since August	2000
The Interzone Mantras	The Tea Party	2001
Daylight Saving	Subb	2002
Ladies and Gentlemen, Welcome To The Tangiers	Soap Opera	2002

=== Console history ===
- 1974-1980 Trident A Range, the first of its kind, now in use at New Monkey Studio in Van Nuys, California
- 1980-1985 SSL 4000E, Serial No. 11, in use at Tree Sound Studios in Atlanta since 1993
- 1985-2008 SSL 4000G sold off in parts

== Le Studio Mobile ==
First built in 1979, Le Studio Mobile provided recording services for live music and special events. The first truck included a 12-input mixing console and 4-track recording. By 2010, a pair of trucks provided 8 mixing consoles on-board provided a total of 144 microphone inputs and 244 tracks of simultaneous recording permanently installed in a 7.5 foot (2.3 m) wide 5-ton truck. It was used to record such live albums as Rush's Exit... Stage Left, The Indspire Awards, Hockey Night in Canada and the Montreal International Jazz Festival. The company covered the Juno Awards for more than 23 years, adding a second truck in 2008.

The final large event handled by Le Studio was the Opening, Closing, and Medal Ceremonies of the 2010 Olympic Games in Vancouver.

Through the years Le Studio Mobile evolved with the industry, focusing first on live recorded albums, then audio for DVD productions before moving more into producing audio for live productions while live music productions for HD television brought new business to Le Studio Mobile around 2010, the remote recording business continued to shrink.

As of 2018, Le Studio Mobile had ceased operation. In 2020, the recording area was demolished, and in 2021, the area was cleared and put up for sale for $850,000.
