= Soulbreaking =

- Commercial CD Single, Canada

Single by The Tea Party

from the album The Interzone Mantras
- A-side: "Soulbreaking (Radio edit)"
- B-side: "Leaning on Love"
- Released: 2002
- Recorded: Studio Morin Heights (Morin Heights)
- Genre: Rock
- Length: 4:13
- Label: EMI Music Canada
- Songwriter(s): The Tea Party
- Producer(s): Jeff Martin

The Tea Party singles chronology
"Angels" (2002)	"Soulbreaking" (2002)	"Writing's on the Wall" (2004)

Alternative cover
- Artwork of the Limited edition "Soulbreaking" single.

"Soulbreaking" is a song by Canadian rock band The Tea Party. It was released as a charity single in Canada to assist the White Ribbon Campaign. The charity single was issued in standard and limited quantities, with 100% of the proceeds from the sale of the limited edition of 400 individually numbered and autographed pieces donated to charity. The single features "Leaning on Love," the earliest released Jeff Martin solo song, inspired by the events of September 11, with some royalties donated to "The Morty Frank Memorial Fund" - Mr. Frank, a friend of the band, was killed while working at the World Trade Center.

"Soulbreaking" is a three-piece rock song, inspired by a letter written by a fan attempting to deal with incest:

"It was just an anonymous e-mail from a young girl," Martin says, "who had heard about my involvement in the White Ribbon campaign, which is men against violence against women. She wasn't really looking for any answers; she wasn't asking that of me. She was just saying that the music of The Tea Party helped her get through."

Martin hoped that by writing a response through song and using lines from the letter as lyrics, "Soulbreaking" would offer a thread of strength to the girl, and to girls like her, so that they could get themselves out of those situations.

== Track listing ==
1. "Soulbreaking (Radio edit)" - 4:13
2. "Leaning on Love" (Jeff Martin) - 4:46
