= Floria Sigismondi =

Canadian artist and filmmaker

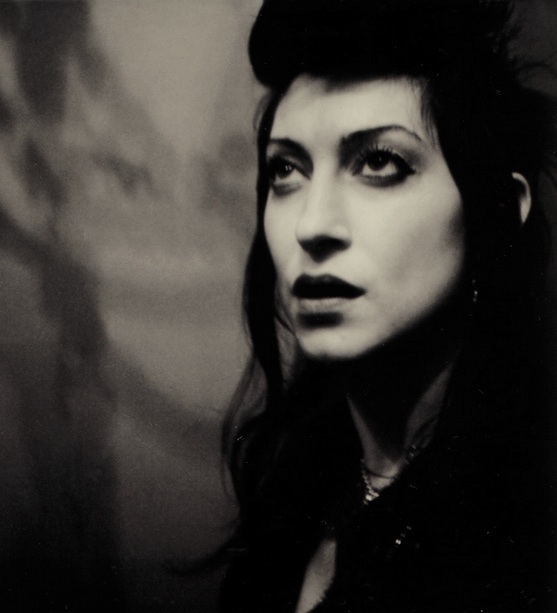
- Sigismondi in 2011
- Born: 1973 (age 52–53); Pescara, Abruzzo, Italy
- Education: Ontario College of Art
- Occupations: Film director; screenwriter; music video director; artist; photographer
- Years active: 1992–present
- Spouse: Lawrence Rothman
- Children: 1
- Website: floriasigismondi.com

Floria Sigismondi (/ˌsɪdʒɪzˈmɒndi/, born 1973) is an Italian-Canadian film director, screenwriter, music video director, artist, and photographer.

She is best known for writing and directing The Runaways, for directing music videos for performers including Dua Lipa, Sam Smith, David Bowie, Rihanna, Marilyn Manson, Christina Aguilera, Justin Timberlake, Leonard Cohen, Katy Perry, Björk, The White Stripes, Jimmy Page and Robert Plant and Ellie Goulding, and commercials. Sigismondi has also directed two episodes of The Handmaid's Tale and American Gods.

== Life and career ==
Sigismondi was born in Pescara, Abruzzo, Italy. Her parents, Lina and Domenico Sigismondi, were opera singers. Her family, including her sister Antonella, moved to Hamilton, Ontario, Canada when she was two. Starting in 1990, she studied painting and illustration at the Ontario College of Art, today's Ontario College of Art & Design University (OCADU).

Sigismondi started a career as a fashion photographer. She came to directing music videos when she was approached by the production company The Revolver Film Co., and directed music videos for a number of Canadian bands. Her innovative, but also disturbing video works, located in sceneries she once described as "entropic underworlds inhabited by tortured souls and omnipotent beings," attracted a number of very prominent musicians. She has further described her works as, "Something quite textural and brutal" and something quite beautiful and light. It's like blending two worlds."

With her photography and sculpture installations she had solo exhibitions in Hamilton and Toronto, New York City, Brescia (Italy), Gothenburg (Sweden), and London. Her photographs also were included in group exhibitions, together with artists Cindy Sherman, Joel-Peter Witkin, and Francesco Clemente. The German art press Die Gestalten Verlag has published two monographs of her photography, Redemption (1999) and Immune (2005). Sigismondi also creates her own set props for various music video productions such as, Perfume Genius's "Die 4 U". "If I don't create them myself, I design or draw them, I can get quite tactile detailed as far as what I see." She has an affinity for strange yet alluring things and created a flesh-esque chair to appeal to the sexual tension and desire to the spectator.

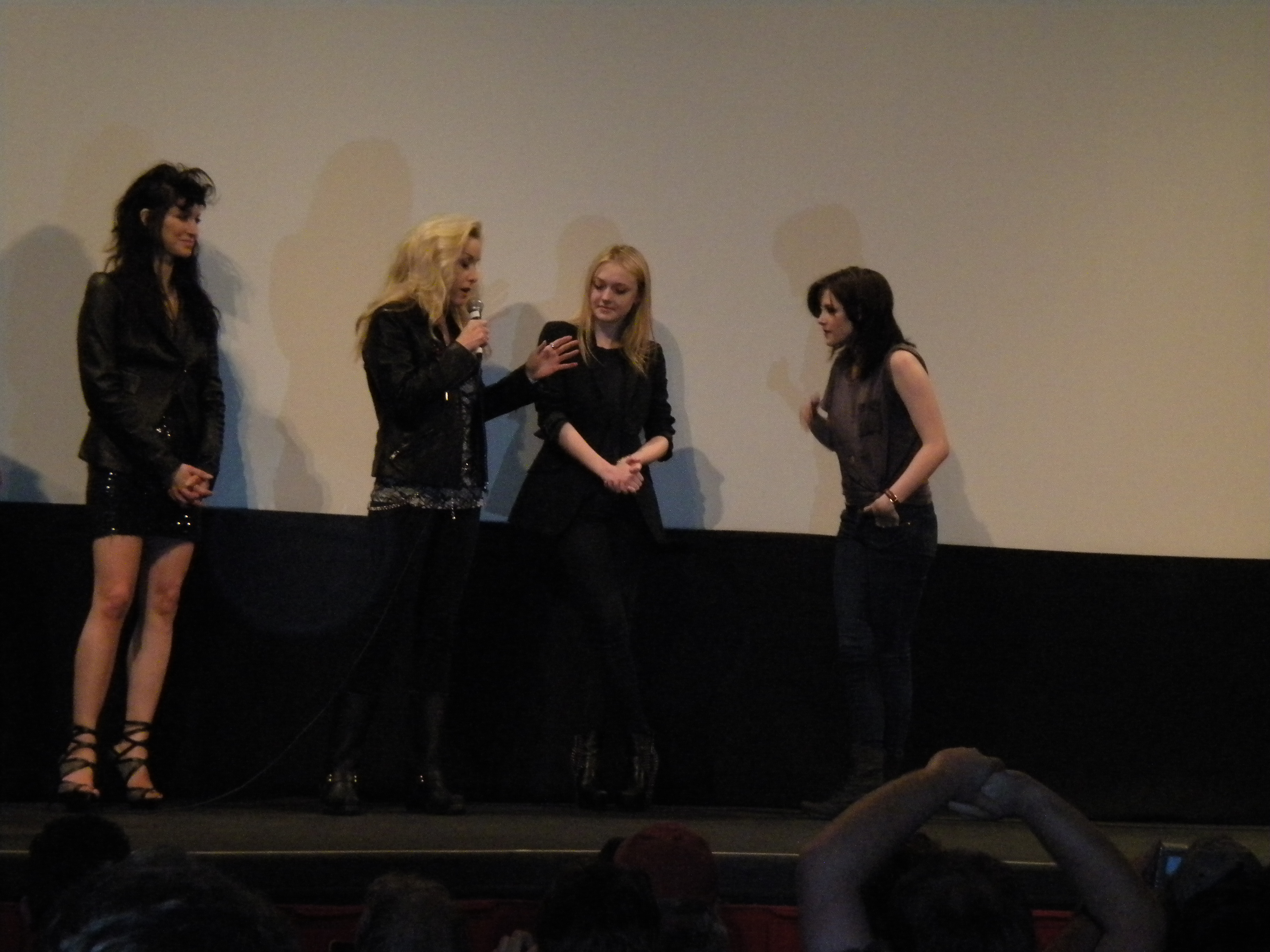
Floria Sigismondi, Cherie Currie, Dakota Fanning, Kristen Stewart

== Film director ==
Sigismondi's first feature-length film was The Runaways, a period piece about the 1970s all-girl rock and roll band The Runaways. The film is largely about the relationship between Joan Jett and Cherie Currie. Sigismondi wrote the screenplay based on Currie's book Neon Angel: A Memoir of a Runaway. The film premiered in 2010 at the Sundance Film Festival and was released in Canada and the United States in March 2010.

In 2020, Sigismondi directed the horror film The Turning, which was inspired by the 1898 Henry James novella The Turn of the Screw, and stars Mackenzie Davis and Finn Wolfhard.

== Filmography ==
Short film

- Postmortem Bliss (2006)
- Leaning Towards Solace (2012)

Feature film

- The Runaways (2010)
- The Turning (2020)
- The Silence of Mercy (TBA)

Television

Year	Title	Episode(s)
2014	Hemlock Grove	"Bodily Fluids"
2016	Daredevil	"Kinbaku"
2017	The Handmaid's Tale	"A Woman's Place"
2017	The Handmaid's Tale	"The Other Side"
2017	American Gods	"Come to Jesus"

== Music videos (selection) ==
Director

Title	Year	Artist	Notes
"This is My Life"	1992	Rita Chiarelli	
"Not Quite Sonic"	1993	I Mother Earth	
"A Certain Slant of Light"	1993	The Tea Party	
"Save Me"	1993	The Tea Party	
"The River"	1993	The Tea Party	
"The Birdman"	1994	Our Lady Peace	version 1
"Blue"	1995	Harem Scarem	
"Four Leaf Clover"	1996	Catherine	
"The Beautiful People"	1996	Marilyn Manson	
"Anna Is a Speed Freak"	1996	Pure	
"Tourniquet"	1996	Marilyn Manson	
"Little Wonder"	1996	David Bowie	
"Black Eye"	1997	Fluffy	
"Dead Man Walking"	1997	David Bowie	
"Makes Me Wanna Die"	1997	Tricky	
"(Can't You) Trip Like I Do"	1997	Filter & The Crystal Method	
"Anything but Down"	1998	Sheryl Crow	
"Sweet Surrender"	1998	Sarah McLachlan	
"Most High"	1998	Jimmy Page and Robert Plant	
"Chinese Burn"	1998	Curve	
"Can't Get Loose"	1998	Barry Adamson	
"Get Up"	1999	Amel Larrieux	
"I've Seen It All"	2000	Björk	interactive "webeo" version
"4 Ton Mantis"	2000	Amon Tobin	
"In My Secret Life"	2001	Leonard Cohen	
"Black Amour"	2002	Barry Adamson	
"She Said"	2002	Jon Spencer Blues Explosion	version 2
"John, 2/14"	2002	Shivaree	
"Untitled #1 (Vaka)"	2003	Sigur Rós	MTV Europe Music Award 2003 Best Video
"Obstacle 1"	2003	Interpol	
"Anything"	2003	Martina Topley-Bird	
"Bombs Below"	2003	Living Things	version 1
"Fighter"	2003	Christina Aguilera	JUNO Award 2004 Video of the Year
"Megalomaniac"	2004	Incubus	
"The End of The World"	2004	The Cure	
"I Owe..."	2004	Living Things	
"Talk Shows on Mute"	2004	Incubus	
"Bombs Below"	2004	Living Things	version 2
"Blue Orchid"	2005	The White Stripes	
"Bom Bom Bom"	2005	Living Things	
"O' Sailor"	2005	Fiona Apple	
"Supermassive Black Hole"	2006	Muse	
"Red Flag"	2006	Billy Talent	
"Hurt"	2006	Christina Aguilera	
"Broken Boy Soldier"	2006	The Raconteurs	
"Let It Rain"	2009	Living Things	
"Die by the Drop"	2010	The Dead Weather	
"Cherry Bomb"	2010	Dakota Fanning & Kristen Stewart	
"E.T."	2011	Katy Perry	
"The One That Got Away"	2011	Katy Perry	
"Har Megiddo"	2011	Living Things	
"Fake It Baby, Fake It (La Dame Nature)"	2012	Living Things	
"Anything Could Happen"	2012	Ellie Goulding	
"Try"	2012	P!nk	
"Leaning Towards Solace"	2012	Sigur Rós	
"The Stars (Are Out Tonight)"	2013	David Bowie	
"Mirrors"	2013	Justin Timberlake	MTV Video Music Award 2013 Video of the Year
"The Next Day"	2013	David Bowie	
"Montauk Fling"	2013	Lawrence Rothman	
"#1 All Time Low"	2013	Lawrence Rothman	
"Fatal Attraction"	2013	Lawrence Rothman	
"California Paranoia"	2015	Lawrence Rothman ft. Angel Olsen	
"Oz vs. Eden"	2015	Lawrence Rothman	
"Users"	2015	Lawrence Rothman	
"H"	2016	Lawrence Rothman	
"Sledgehammer"	2016	Rihanna	
"Die 4 You"	2017	Perfume Genius	
"Without Love"	2017	Alice Glass	
"Ain't Afraid Of Dying"	2017	Lawrence Rothman ft. Marissa Nadler	
"Designer Babies"	2017	Lawrence Rothman ft. Kim Gordon	
"Jordan"	2017	Lawrence Rothman ft. Kristin Kontrol	
"Swan Song"	2019	Dua Lipa	From Alita: Battle Angel
"Lifetime"	2019	Yves Tumor	
"Into Happiness"	2019	Phantogram	
"Unholy"	2022	Sam Smith ft. Kim Petras	
"Destiny"	2025	Ellie Goulding	
"Return to Myself"	2025	Brandi Carlile	
"Human"	2025	Brandi Carlile	

Cinematographer

- 2000 "4 Ton Mantis", Amon Tobin

== Awards ==
- 1997 MTV Music Video Awards, USA - Nomination for Best Rock Video: "Beautiful People" (Marilyn Manson)
- 1998 British Music Video Awards, UK - Nomination for Best Video: "Little Wonder" (David Bowie)
- 1999 German Kodak Photobook Award, for her book Redemption
- 2003 MTV European Awards - Best International Video Award, for Untitled (Sigur Rós)
- 2003 New York Underground Film Festival - Audio/Visual Award, for Untitled (Sigur Rós)
- 2003 Advertising and Design Awards, Toronto, Ontario, Canada - Special Merit Award for Music Video, for "Fighter" (Christina Aguilera)
- 2004 Juno Awards, Canada - Best Music Video, for "Fighter" (Christina Aguilera)
- 2013 MTV Music Video Award, USA - Winner for Video of The Year, for Mirrors (Justin Timberlake)
- 2024 UK Music Video Awards - Icon Award

== Bibliography ==
- Sigismondi, Floria (1999). Redemption. Gestalten Verlag. ISBN 3931126188.
- Sigismondi, Floria (2005). Immune. Gestalten Verlag. ISBN 3899550692.
