= Alhambra (EP) =

EP by The Tea Party
- Released: March 1996 (Canada); 18 November 1996 (Australia)
- Recorded: December 1994, August 1995
- Studio: A&M, Hollywood; Le Studio, Morin Heights
- Genre: Rock
- Length: 27:50
- Label: EMI Music Canada
- Producer: Jeff Martin, Ed Stasium

The Tea Party chronology
The Edges of Twilight (1995)	Alhambra (1996)	Transmission (1997)

Professional ratings
Review scores
Source	Rating
AllMusic	link

Alhambra (1996) is the first EP by the Tea Party and was used as a bridge between The Edges of Twilight and Transmission albums. It includes four intricately re-worked acoustic songs from The Edges of Twilight and two others; the first a song entitled "Time" with Roy Harper on vocals, the second a remix of "Sister Awake" by Rhys Fulber.

Alhambra is an Enhanced CD and includes multimedia that the band used as a way to explain themselves, inviting fans to explore the details of exotic instruments, song meanings and video and audio clips.

The first song on the EP is "The Grand Bazaar", which was recorded during The Edges of Twilight sessions in December 1994 at A&M Studios in Los Angeles. The acoustic songs and "Time" were recorded in August 1995 at Le Studio (Morin Heights), with more acoustic versions of songs from these sessions appearing as B-sides ("The River", "Save Me" and "Sister Awake") on later singles and the European Triptych Special Tour Edition 2000 album.

EMI Music Canada re-issued Alhambra on 5 March 2002 with the multimedia CD-ROM component updated to work correctly on the Windows XP Operating System. The EP was long out of stock in Canada.

"The Grand Bazaar", "Inanna (acoustic version)", "Silence (acoustic version)" and "Time" can be found on second disc of the 2015 deluxe edition of The Edges of Twilight. "The Grand Bazaar" is incorrectly listed as "Sarode Bazaar (previously unreleased)".

== Track listing ==
All songs written by the Tea Party, except "Time" written by Jeff Martin and Roy Harper and "Turn the Lamp Down Low", another title for the rock standard "Baby, Please Don't Go", originally a traditional blues song.

1. "The Grand Bazaar" – 3:55
2. "Inanna (acoustic version)" – 3:20
3. "Silence (acoustic version)" – 3:57
4. "Turn the Lamp Down Low (acoustic version)" – 4:58
5. "Time" – 6:58
6. "Sister Awake Remix" – 4:37

== Credits ==
- Jeff Burrows – drums and percussion
- Stuart Chatwood – bass guitars
- Jeff Martin – guitars, vocals, production at A&M Studios
- Roy Harper – vocals on "Time"
- Rhys Fulber – additional production and keyboard programming on "Sister Awake Remix"
- Susann Richter – background vocals on "Sister Awake Remix"
- Ed Stasium – recording, production and mixing
- Paul Hamington – engineering
- Simon Pressey – engineering and mixing on "Inanna" (acoustic version), "Silence" (acoustic version), "Turn the Lamp Down" (acoustic version) at Le Studio
- Greg Reely – mixing on "Sister Awake Remix" at Warehouse Studio, Vancouver
- Dave Collins – mastering at A&M Mastering (Los Angeles)
- Verve Graphic Design Consultants Inc. (Toronto) – design
- Simone Orlando – front & back cover image
- Ray Danniels and Steve Hoffman (SRO Management) – management
