= Transmission (The Tea Party album) =

1997 album by the Tea Party

Studio album by the Tea Party
- Released: August 19, 1997
- Studios: Alkemical Studios (Montreal), NRG Studios (Los Angeles), Le Studio (Morin Heights)
- Genres: Industrial rock, hard rock
- Length: 49:34
- Labels: EMI Music Canada; Atlantic
- Producer: Jeff Martin

The Tea Party chronology
Alhambra (1996)	Transmission (1997)	Triptych (1999)

Singles from Transmission
- 1. "Temptation" Released: July 1997; 2. "Babylon" Released: September 1997; 3. "Release" Released: April 1998; 4. "Psychopomp" Released: 1998; 5. "Gyroscope" Released: 1998

Professional ratings
Review scores
Source	Rating
Allmusic	link

Transmission is the fourth album recorded by the Canadian band the Tea Party, released in 1997. AllMusic described the album as "Sounding a lot like a Nine Inch Nails of the north... Full of hard rock thrust with industrial edge".

While still using several exotic instruments and maintaining the "eastern" influence in the recording, many songs also include samples, sequencers and loops alongside the traditional acoustic instruments. The album makes lyrical references to the afterlife ("Psychopomp"), the dystopian works of Aldous Huxley, George Orwell, Yevgeny Zamyatin ("Army Ants") and Giovanni Piranesi's 'Imaginary Prisons' ("Alarum").

Transmission continued to build on the momentum generated by The Edges of Twilight, receiving a 1998 Juno nomination for "Blockbuster Rock Album of the Year". An edited version of the single "Temptation", as well as an instrumental version of "Babylon", can be found on the PlayStation game Road Rash 3D, from the same year.

== Commercial performance ==
Transmission reached #3 on the Canadian Albums Chart. It was among the top 60 best-selling albums in Canada in 1997. In 1999, the album was certified Double Platinum in Canada.

== Track listing ==
No.	Title	Length
1.	"Temptation"	3:25
2.	"Army Ants"	3:33
3.	"Psychopomp"	5:17
4.	"Gyroscope"	2:56
5.	"Alarum"	4:58
6.	"Release"	4:05
7.	"Transmission"	5:17
8.	"Babylon"	2:50
9.	"Pulse"	4:09
10.	"Emerald"	4:51
11.	"Aftermath"	5:43

=== Hidden tracks ===
Transmission contains two hidden pieces of music, both hidden in the pregap:

- An untitled piece consisting solely of electronically processed voices and sounds is located between tracks 6 and 7, lasting approximately 15 seconds
- An instrumental piece entitled "Embryo", lasting approximately 2 minutes, can be found between tracks 8 and 9

== Personnel ==
Production

- Produced and recorded by: Jeff Martin
  - Recording assistants: Don Hachey and Lee Moro
- Recorded at: Alkemical Studios (Montreal), NRG Studios (Los Angeles), Le Studio (Morin Heights)
- Mixed by: Jeff Martin
  - Tracks 2, 3, and 6 mixed by: Jeff Martin and Adam Kasper
- Mixed at: NRG Studios (Los Angeles), Studio Morin Heights (Morin Heights)
- Mastered by: Bob Ludwig
- Mastered at: Gateway Mastering (Portland)
  - Assistants: Don Hachey, Brian Virtue and Robert Carranza

Design

- Cover painting: "The Earth We Inherit" by Stuart Chatwood
  - Concept: Stuart Chatwood and James St. Laurent
- Art design: Verve Graphic Design Consultants Inc.

== Charts and sales ==
Chart performance for Transmission
Chart (1997)	Peak position
Canada Top Albums/CDs (RPM)	3
Australian Albums (ARIA)	5

=== Sales ===
Region	Certification	Certified units/sales
Canada	—	200,000
United States	—	32,000

== 20th anniversary tour ==
Tx 20

EP by The Tea Party
- Released: October 19, 2017
- Length: 17:44
- Label: Eternal Discs

The Tea Party chronology
The Ocean at the End (2014)	Tx 20 (2017)	Black River EP (2019)

In 2017 The Tea Party celebrated the 20th anniversary of Transmission with a world tour and release of a remix EP. The 20 Years of Transmission Tour was promoted on social media through hashtag #tx20. From February 2017 to April 2017 the band played 33 shows across Canada, Buffalo, NY and along the US west coast. Six additional concerts were played in Australia October 27 through November 10, 2017. The Tea Party played Transmission in full, including songs never before played live, then after a break they performed a second set of the band's hit songs." Fans purchasing a concert VIP package could also receive a special limited edition Transmission coffee table book containing a photo essay compiled by band member Stuart Chatwood that covered the album's release period.

=== Tx 20 ===
Tx 20 is a studio EP by The Tea Party containing four reworked modern versions of songs from Transmission. Preceding the Australian leg of the 20th anniversary world tour, the digital-only release first appeared on Spotify in the Australia region on October 19, 2017. October 27 it was made available worldwide on streaming music services as well as lossless audio and MP3 digital downloads from the band's web site.

=== Track listing ===
No.	Title	Length
1.	"Temptation" (Tx 20 Remix)	3:29
2.	"Psychopomp" (Tx 20 Remix)	4:57
3.	"Release" (Tx 20 Remix)	4:00
4.	"Transmission" (Tx 20 Remix)	5:18
