= Lavender Hill Mob (band) =

Canadian pop music group

Lavender Hill Mob was a Canadian band that was active in the late 1970s. They released two albums on United Artists Records.

== Reception ==
The Los Angeles Times wrote, "Lead singer Nicky Prigeno's romantic delivery is a cross between Paul McCartney and Rupert Holmes". In February 1978, Billboard selected the single "Dream Away" as one of its recommended pop music single picks.

== Albums ==
- Lavender Hill Mob – released in 1977 (#76 Canada)
- Lavender Hill Mob (sometimes referred to as Street of Dreams after one of its singles) – released in 1978

== Singles ==
Year	Song	CAN
1977	"Party Song"	48
1978	"Dream Away"	65

== Band members ==
- Nicky Prigeno – Lead vocals, bass
- Ronny Jones – Vocals, lead guitar
- Gerry Hardy – Vocals, flute,
- Chuck Chandler – Vocals, assorted keyboards and synthesizers
- Vito Fiore – Drums, percussion
