= Fire in the Head =

- Commercial CD Single, Australia

Single by The Tea Party

from the album The Edges of Twilight
- Released: 17 April 1995
- Recorded: A&M Studios (Los Angeles)
- Length: 5:04
- Label: EMI Music Canada
- Songwriter(s): The Tea Party
- Producer(s): Jeff Martin and Ed Stasium

The Tea Party singles chronology
"Midsummer Day" (1994)	"Fire in the Head" (1995)	"The Bazaar" (1995)

"Fire in the Head" is a song by Canadian rock band The Tea Party. It was released as a single in Australia and a promotional single in Canada, the UK and the USA. The music video, directed by Dean Karr, was shot in Los Angeles while the band were recording The Edges of Twilight.

"Fire in the Head" is a standard three-piece rock composition and features a broken mellotron, it was written during the band's first cross Canada tour with Roy and Nick Harper with Jeff Martin intending to use the song on Roy Harper's next album until the band jammed it with loud drums, bass and guitar. Lyrically it is influenced by Tom Cowan's book Fire in the Head.

== Track listing ==
1. "Fire in the Head (edit)"
2. "Fire in the Head"
3. "Inanna"
4. "Drawing Down the Moon"

== Charts ==
Chart (1995)	Peak position
Australia (ARIA)	79
