= The Interzone Mantras =

Studio album by The Tea Party
- Released: October 16, 2001 (Canada)
- Recorded: 2001
- Studio: Le Studio, Morin Heights and Metalworks Studios, Mississauga
- Genre: Rock
- Length: 54:34
- Label: EMI Music Canada
- Producer: Jeff Martin

The Tea Party chronology
Tangents (2000)	The Interzone Mantras (2001)	Seven Circles (2004)

Professional ratings
Review scores
Source	Rating
AllMusic	3/5 stars

The Interzone Mantras is the sixth album by Canadian rock group The Tea Party, released in 2001. Named after William S. Burroughs' book of short stories Interzone and the band's interest in eastern mysticism and esoteric philosophies, the songwriting on The Interzone Mantras builds on the subtle electronica and ballads of Triptych, whilst returning to the familiar territory of their earlier albums with 1970s rock and world music influences. Jeff Martin explained that the album was a return to basics:

"The last two records, Transmission and Triptych, were very much creations of the studio - meticulously built. With this record we felt that we wanted to put a spark of passion underneath our asses.

"So many people have told us that we're this great live rock band, and I just wanted to see if, as producer, I could capture that on this record. I put us in a rehearsal space, the three of us, faced each other with just guitar, bass and drums - no toys - and, you know, 'let's Rock!'" The new approach fired the band up to such an extent that the album was recorded in just twenty days - "unheard of" for The Tea Party, Martin says.

Martin has special praise for drummer Jeff Burrows, who he proudly proclaims to be "THE best rock drummer going", and who did every drum track in one take.

Lyrically the album draws from the works of modern writers Aleister Crowley, Mikhail Bulgakov, Wim Wenders, to ancient Greek mythology (Morpheus on "Lullaby"). The lyrics themselves written by Martin when holidaying in Prague, after the music was written from jams in the band's rehearsal space.

The Interzone Mantras sold 17,300 copies in Canada in its first week. The first 100,000 Canadian copies of the album were packaged with a special lenticular cover, with Alessandro Bavari's depiction of Shiva moving depending on the viewing angle. Although not as commercially successful as previous albums, The Interzone Mantras is The Tea Party's highest charting album in Australia (debuting at #6 on the ARIA chart) and is certified Gold in Canada. It was also nominated for "Rock Album of the Year" at the 2003 Juno Awards.

Notably, it was one of the final albums to be recorded at famous Quebec facility Le Studio before it was shuttered in 2002.

== Track listing ==
No.	Title	Length
1.	"Interzone"	3:39
2.	"Angels"	4:54
3.	"The Master and Margarita"	4:13
4.	"Apathy"	3:55
5.	"Soulbreaking"	4:45
6.	"Lullaby"	4:19
7.	"Must Must"	3:59
8.	"Walking Wounded"	4:38
9.	"White Water Siren"	4:54
10.	"Cathartik"	5:00
11.	"Dust to Gold"	4:20
12.	"Requiem"	4:30
13.	"Mantra"	8:00

== Singles ==
- "Lullaby"
- "Angels"
- "Soulbreaking"

== Personnel ==
- Jeff Martin – production and recording
- Nick Blagona and Don Hachey – engineering
- Recorded at Studio Morin Heights (Morin Heights, Quebec) and Metalworks Studios (Mississauga)
- Jeff Martin and Nick Blagona – mixing at Metalworks Studios
- Nick Blagona – mastering at Metalworks Mastering
- Stuart Chatwood – art direction
- Alessandro Bavari – artwork
- Antonie Moonen – design
- David Giammarco – special thanks

=== Guests ===
- Marc Oulette – string arrangements
- "Soulbreaking", "Requiem", "Mantra"
  - Joanna Morin and Francois Pilon – 1st violins
  - Élise Lavoie and Pascale Gagnon – 2nd violins
  - Brian Bacon and Juie Dupras – violas
  - Vincent Bernard and Élisabeth Dubé – cellos
- "Interzone", "Apathy"
  - Muhammad Abdul Al Khabyyr – trombone
  - Jean-Pierre Zanetta – baritone, tenor and soprano saxophones
  - Maxine St-Pierre – trumpet
  - Francois D'Amours – tenor and alto saxophone
- Paul Atkins – additional percussion on "Interzone", "The Master and Margarita", "Lullaby", and additional vocals and percussion on "Must Must"

== Charts ==
=== Weekly charts ===
Chart performance for The Interzone Mantras
Chart (2001)	Peak position
Australian Albums (ARIA)	6

=== Year-end charts ===
2001 year-end chart performance for The Interzone Mantras
Chart (2001)	Position
Canadian Albums (Nielsen SoundScan)	172

2002 year-end chart performance for The Interzone Mantras
Chart (2002)	Position
Canadian Alternative Albums (Nielsen SoundScan)	143
