= Triptych (The Tea Party album) =

Studio album by The Tea Party
- Released: June 8, 1999
- Recorded: October 10, 1998 – March 3, 1999
- Studios: Alkemical Studios, Montreal; Le Studio, Morin-Heights, Quebec, and Metalworks Studios, Mississauga
- Genres: Alternative rock, progressive rock, hard rock
- Length: 51:25
- Label: EMI Music Canada
- Producer: Jeff Martin

The Tea Party chronology
Transmission (1997)	Triptych (1999)	Live at the Enmore Theatre (1999)

Professional ratings
Review scores
Source	Rating
AllMusic	link
Rock Hard)	9/10

Triptych (stylized as TRIPtych) is The Tea Party's fifth album, released in 1999. It has the trio blending the major influences found on their previous albums: the earthy rock of Splendor Solis, the world music inspired arrangements of The Edges of Twilight, and the industrial edge of Transmission.

After the gloom of Transmission, which relied heavily on sampling and electronica, for Triptych the band wrote with both melody and content, while using electronica subtlety. This is evidenced by the Juno Award nominated single "Heaven Coming Down", the band's first number one single in Canada. The album itself reached #4 on the Canadian album chart, and received a Juno nomination for "Best Rock Album", before achieving double platinum sales in Canada.

In June 2000, the EMI labels in Europe released Triptych Special Tour Edition 2000, which included a bonus disc of eight unreleased songs.

== Reception ==
In 2005, Triptych was ranked number 435 in Rock Hard magazine's book The 500 Greatest Rock & Metal Albums of All Time.

== Track listing ==
No.	Title	Length
1.	"Touch"	3:57
2.	"Underground"	3:41
3.	"Great Big Lie"	3:50
4.	"Heaven Coming Down"	4:01
5.	"The Halcyon Days"	5:57
6.	"The Messenger" (Daniel Lanois cover)	3:32
7.	"Samsara"	3:56
8.	"A Slight Attack"	3:15
9.	"Taking Me Away"	5:02
10.	"These Living Arms"	5:03
11.	"Chimera"	4:29
12.	"Gone"	3:35
13.	Untitled (hidden track)	1:02

The unlisted 13th track is the sound of a clock chiming.

=== Special Tour Edition 2000 Bonus Disc ===
1. "Psychopomp" (live) – 5:10
2. "The River" (live) – 5:11
3. "Save Me" (live) – 8:23
4. "Lifeline" – 4:37
5. "A Woman Like You" (Bert Jansch) – 3:46
6. "Temptation" (Rhys Fulber remix) – 5:50
7. "Sister Awake" (live) – 5:35
8. "Waiting for a Sign" – 4:19

== Singles ==
- "Heaven Coming Down"
- "The Messenger"
- "Touch"
- "These Living Arms"
- "Gone"

== Personnel ==
- Jeff Martin – production and recording
- Don Hachey – engineering
- Jeff Martin and Nick Blagona – mixing at Metalworks Studios (Mississauga)
- Nick Blagona – mastering at Metalworks Mastering
- Stuart Chatwood – cover art conception
- Antonie Moonen – design
- James St Laurent – cover photography
- David Giammarco – special thanks

=== String quartet ===
- "Gone"
  - Ligia Paquin – viola
  - François Pilon – violin
  - Benoit Loiselle – cello
  - Stéphanie Meyer – cello

== Charts ==
Chart performance for Triptych
Chart (1999)	Peak position
Australian Albums (ARIA)	14
