= Release (The Tea Party song) =

- Commercial CD Single, Canada

Single by the Tea Party

from the album Transmission
- A-side: "Release (Lord-Alge radio mix)", "Release (Jeff Martin mix)"
- B-side: "Temptation (Rhys Fulber mix)", "Save Me (Alhambra mix)"
- Released: April 1998
- Studio: NRG Studios, Los Angeles
- Genre: Rock
- Length: 3:59
- Label: EMI Music Canada
- Songwriter(s): The Tea Party
- Producer(s): Jeff Martin

The Tea Party singles chronology
"Babylon" (1997)	"Release" (1998)	"Psychopomp" (1998)

"Release" is a song by Canadian rock band the Tea Party. It was released as a charity single in Canada and a promotional single in the US. The music video was shot in Paris and Toronto.

"Release" is a standard three-piece rock composition and with keyboard accompaniment, written after Jeff Martin watched a BBC report about the state of women's rights worldwide, the song intended as an apology to women. After the release of Transmission the band continued the sentiment by releasing a charity single to assist the White Ribbon Campaign.

== Track listing ==
EMI Music maxi-single CD

1. "Release (Tom Lord-Alge radio mix)" – 3:59
2. "Release (Jeff Martin mix)" – 4:15
3. "Temptation (Rhys Fulber mix)" – 5:50
4. "Save Me (Alhambra mix)" – 8:23
