= Splendor Solis (album) =

Studio album by The Tea Party
- Released: 11 June 1993 (Canada); January 1994 (United States)
- Studio: White Crow Audio, Burlington, Vermont
- Genre: Hard rock
- Length: 56:07
- Label: EMI Music Canada; Chrysalis
- Producer: Jeff Martin

The Tea Party chronology
The Tea Party (1991)	Splendor Solis (1993)	The Edges of Twilight (1995)

Professional ratings
Review scores
Source	Rating
AllMusic	link

Splendor Solis is the second album by Canadian rock band The Tea Party, released in 1993 as their first major label release on EMI Music Canada. The album sold very well in Canada, reaching #20 on the Canadian album chart and achieving platinum status in 1994 and earning a Juno nomination for Best Hard Rock Album. The band was also nominated for Best New Group.

== Overview ==
The album draws heavily on the rock and blues of the 1970s, as well as displaying some psychedelic influences. As a result, The Tea Party was often compared to Led Zeppelin, a parallel that was reinforced by Jeff Martin playing guitar with a violin bow (not unlike Jimmy Page) on "Save Me". Martin's appearance, voice and singing style also drew comparisons to those of Jim Morrison, as did some of the album's lyrics.

"Sure," said Stuart Chatwood said of these comparisons "we draw from 70s rock as much as the other influences we've talked about. You can't ignore the power that Led Zeppelin or The Doors had, and there are elements of those influences in our songs, but it's a cop out to then write us off as some retro act. If people listen closely, they'll appreciate the originality of what we're doing, time changes. The fact that Jeff's a rock baritone doesn't justify the laziness of critics who slag him as a Morrison wanna-be."

== Track listing ==
No.	Title	Length
1.	"The River"	5:44
2.	"Midsummer Day"	5:58
3.	"A Certain Slant of Light"	5:00
4.	"Winter Solstice"	2:45
5.	"Save Me"	6:35
6.	"Sun Going Down"	6:31
7.	"In This Time"	4:57
8.	"Dreams of Reason"	6:19
9.	"Raven Skies"	5:17
10.	"Haze on the Hills"	2:24
11.	"The Majestic Song"	4:37

== Singles ==
- "The River"
- "Save Me"
- "A Certain Slant of Light"

Music videos directed by Floria Sigismondi.

- "In This Time"
- "Midsummer Day"

== Re-recorded songs ==
Splendor Solis includes re-recordings of several songs from the band's independent album, The Tea Party:

- "Midsummer Day"
- "Winter Solstice"
- "Save Me"
- "Sun Going Down"
- "Dreams of Reason"

== Personnel ==
- Jeff Burrows – drums and percussion
- Stuart Chatwood – bass guitars, cello, art coordination
- Jeff Martin – guitars, vocals, production at White Crow Audio (Burlington, Vermont)
- Glen Robinson – engineering and mixing at Powerplay Studios (New York City)
- Alex Armitage – assistant mixing engineer at Power Play Studios (New York City)
- Bob Ludwig – remastering at Gateway Mastering Studios (Portland, Maine)
- Steve Cole – art conception and design

== Charts ==
Chart performance for Splendor Solis
Chart (1994)	Peak position
Australian Albums (ARIA)	30
New Zealand Albums (RMNZ)	44

=== Sales ===
Region	Certification	Certified units/sales
Canada	—	175,000
United States	—	24,000
