= The Tea Party (album) =

Studio album by The Tea Party
- Released: June 1991
- Genre: Rock
- Length: 62:51
- Label: Eternal Discs
- Producer: Jeff Martin

The Tea Party chronology
The Tea Party (1991)	Splendor Solis (1993)

The Tea Party (1991) is the first album by the Canadian rock group The Tea Party. It was originally recorded as a demo which the band submitted to several record companies. However, as the trio did not secure a recording contract, they decided to release the album independently. The album production is relatively lo-fi and the band re-recorded several of the songs for their major label follow-up Splendor Solis. Only 3,500 copies of the album were made, some of which were cassettes; this made the recording collectible to fans. On December 10, 2021, a deluxe remastered edition of the album was released.

== Track listing ==
All music is composed by Jeff Burrows, Stuart Chatwood, Jeff Martin.

No.	Title	Length
1.	"Let Me Show You the Door"	3:22
2.	"Midsummer Day"	5:48
3.	"Little Miss Heaven"	3:18
4.	"Winter Solstice"	2:48
5.	"Save Me"	8:18
6.	"Sun Going Down"	5:17
7.	"Watching What the Rain Blows In"	5:45
8.	"Fallen Angel"	4:52
9.	"Dreams of Reason"	7:40
10.	"Goodman Rag"	3:57
11.	"All My Charms"	5:50
12.	"Baby What You Trying to Do"	5:56

"Baby What You Trying to Do" contains a brief quote from "Train Kept A-Rollin'" during the band's jamming.

=== 2021 Deluxe Edition (2LP 180 Gram Red Vinyl) ===
All music is composed by Jeff Burrows, Stuart Chatwood, Jeff Martin.

LP1 SIDE A
No.	Title	Length
1.	"Let Me Show You the Door"	3:23
2.	"Midsummer Day"	5:50
3.	"Little Miss Heaven"	3:19

LP1 SIDE B
No.	Title	Length
1.	"Winter Solstice"	2:49
2.	"Save Me"	8:20
3.	"Sun Going Down"	5:17

LP2 SIDE A
No.	Title	Length
1.	"Watching What the Rain Blows In"	5:45
2.	"Fallen Angel"	4:53
3.	"Dreams of Reason"	7:39

LP2 SIDE B
No.	Title	Length
1.	"Goodman Rag"	3:58
2.	"All My Charms"	5:52
3.	"Baby What You Trying to Do"	5:57

=== 2021 Deluxe Edition (2CD Digipak) ===
All music is composed by Jeff Burrows, Stuart Chatwood, Jeff Martin.

CD1 Remastered Edition (2021)
No.	Title	Length
1.	"Let Me Show You the Door"	3:23
2.	"Midsummer Day"	5:50
3.	"Little Miss Heaven"	3:19
4.	"Winter Solstice"	2:49
5.	"Save Me"	8:20
6.	"Sun Going Down"	5:17
7.	"Watching What the Rain Blows In"	5:45
8.	"Fallen Angel"	4:53
9.	"Dreams of Reason"	7:39
10.	"Goodman Rag"	3:58
11.	"All My Charms"	5:52
12.	"Baby What You Trying to Do"	5:57

Bonus Tracks
No.	Title	Length
13.	"Solomon's Blues"	4:22
14.	"Pye Dog on the Prowl"	4:16

CD2 Original Master (1991)
No.	Title	Length
1.	"Let Me Show You the Door"	3:24
2.	"Midsummer Day"	5:50
3.	"Little Miss Heaven"	3:19
4.	"Winter Solstice"	2:49
5.	"Save Me"	8:20
6.	"Sun Going Down"	5:18
7.	"Watching What the Rain Blows In"	5:45
8.	"Fallen Angel"	4:55
9.	"Dreams of Reason"	7:39
10.	"Goodman Rag"	3:58
11.	"All My Charms"	5:53
12.	"Baby What You Trying to Do"	5:57

== Singles ==
No singles were released from this recording. However, a video was filmed for "Let Me Show You the Door".

== Credits ==
=== The Tea Party ===
- Jeff Burrows - drums and percussion
- Stuart Chatwood - bass guitars, executive producer
- Jeff Martin - guitars, vocals, producer

=== Others ===
- Jeff Robillard - art direction
- Michael Green - cover art
