= The Messenger (song) =

Single by Daniel Lanois

from the album For the Beauty of Wynona
- Released: March 9, 1993 (Canada); March 23, 1993 (US)
- Recorded: 1991–1993; Real World Bath, TakLab Paris, Dog Town Dublin, Grant Avenue Studio, Canada and Kingsway New Orleans
- Genre: Rock
- Length: 5:27
- Label: Warner Bros.
- Songwriter(s): Daniel Lanois
- Producer(s): Daniel Lanois

"The Messenger" is a song by Canadian songwriter Daniel Lanois. It is the first track of his album For the Beauty of Wynona. It was originally released as a US Promo CD single with the album length of 5:27 and a 4:32 edited version, along with three other singles, "Rain Weather", "Elle Est Bonne Et Belle", and "Another Silver Morning", taken from the Warner video Rocky World. The song was featured by the Huffington Post in their 100 Best Canadian Songs Ever, at number 96.

The song was covered by Canadian rock band The Tea Party. The track was released as a promotional single in Canada. and appears on the 1999 album Triptych. The music video was shot in Toronto, under the direction of George Vale.

== Track listing ==
1. The Messenger - Album Edit (4:32)
2. The Messenger - Album Version (5:27)
3. Rain Weather (3:49)
4. Elle Est Bonne Et Belle (2:47)
5. Another Silver Morning (4:23)
