= Save Me (The Tea Party song) =

- Promo CD Single, CDPRO 801, Canada

Single by The Tea Party

from the album Splendor Solis
- Released: 1993
- Recorded: White Crow Audio (Burlington, Vermont)
- Length: 6:34
- Label: EMI Music Canada
- Songwriter: The Tea Party
- Producer: Jeff Martin

The Tea Party singles chronology
"The River" (1993)	"Save Me" (1993)	"A Certain Slant of Light" (1994)

"Save Me" is a song by Canadian rock band The Tea Party. It was released as a promotional single in Canada. The music video was shot in Toronto; it was directed by Floria Sigismondi.

"Save Me" features Jeff Martin playing guitar with violin bow (not unlike Jimmy Page) by setting the height of the strings to mimic a violin. The song was written in 1991, and was first recorded for The Tea Party's eponymous album. Jeff Martin has said it is an apology to women and to their treatment by men.

"One Canadian magazine, reviewing a Tea Party gig noted '(the band) then went into their power show number "Save Me". Through an accomplished and strongly delivered vocal arrangement and many different interwoven song parts, all on top of cultured yet heavy guitar the band really hit its focus. The spirituality within the band came out in this song as they hushed down about eight minutes in and broke into Daniel Lanois' "The Maker", and then into Hendrix's "Third Stone From the Sun". They were stunning musical maneuvers...'"

== Track listing ==
1. "Save Me (edit)"
2. "Save Me"
3. "The River (remastered)"
