= Temptation (The Tea Party song) =

- Commercial CD Single, Australia

Single by The Tea Party

from the album Transmission
- A-side: "Temptation", "Pulse"
- B-side: "The River (Alhambra Tour)"
- Released: July 1997
- Recorded: Alkemical Studios (Montreal), Studio Morin Heights (Morin Heights)
- Genre: Industrial rock
- Length: 2:55
- Label: EMI Music Canada
- Songwriter: The Tea Party
- Producer: Jeff Martin

The Tea Party singles chronology
"Sister Awake Remix" (1996)	"Temptation" (1997)	"Babylon" (1997)

"Temptation" is a song by Canadian rock band The Tea Party from the album Transmission. It was released as a single in Australia and a promotional single in Canada and the United States. The music video was shot in Toronto.

"Temptation" is a standard three-piece rock song with keyboard accompaniment and an introduction composed of tar (lute) and a sped-up sample of Led Zeppelin's "When the Levee Breaks".

The song ranked #5 on CILQ-FM's Top 107 songs of 1997.

== Trivia ==
- An instrumental of this song was used in Trailer Park Boys: The Movie.
- Also, this song was featured on the soundtrack of the video game Road Rash 3D.
- Additionally, this song was a track on the EA Sports NHL 2002 video game soundtrack.
- The song is covered by Nevermore and released as bonus song on their album The Obsidian Conspiracy
- This song is The Tea Party's only US Chart entry (US Billboard Active Rock Chart #36).

== Track listing ==
1. "Temptation"
2. "The River (Alhambra Tour)"
3. "Pulse"

== Charts ==
Chart performance for "Temptation"
Chart (1997)	Peak position
Australia (ARIA)	57
