= The Edges of Twilight =

Studio album by The Tea Party
- Released: March 21, 1995
- Recorded: 1994
- Studio: A&M Studios (Los Angeles)
- Genre: Rock
- Length: 67:21
- Label: EMI Music Canada; Chrysalis
- Producer: Jeff Martin and Ed Stasium

The Tea Party chronology
Splendor Solis (1993)	The Edges of Twilight (1995)	Alhambra (1996)

Singles from The Edges of Twilight
- 1. "Fire in the Head" Released: 1995; 2. "The Bazaar" Released: 1995; 3. "Shadows on the Mountainside" Released: 1995; 4. "Sister Awake" Released: 1996

Professional ratings
Review scores
Source	Rating
AllMusic	link
Q	link

The Edges of Twilight is the third album by Canadian rock band The Tea Party, released in 1995. The album features many instruments from around the world, giving various songs a strong world music flavour in addition to the rock/blues influences evident in the band's earlier releases. Jeff Burrows explained that "basically we wanted to expand upon the initial idea that we tried on Splendor Solis, which was trying to incorporate different styles of world music into our music. So with this album we became more familiar with many more instruments. In our minds we were trying to do for a rock album what Peter Gabriel does to pop by infusing various cultures, percussion and exotic sounds into it."

The Edges of Twilight helped propel the band into mainstream success in their native Canada, where it reached #11 on the Canadian album chart and double platinum status, and earned the band several Juno nominations, including "Best Rock Album" and "Group of the Year".

The title of the album is taken from a chapter of the book Fire in the Head, by the American author Tom Cowan; it also inspired the name of the first track on the album.

== Composition ==
"The Bazaar" is a standard three-piece rock song with an introduction composed of harmonium and goblet drums. Jeff Burrows described the song as fusing "the exotic with heavier rock side of the band better than any other song".

"Shadows on the Mountainside" is a folk inspired composition written for Gibson harp guitar, mandolin and tabla drums. The band's first public performance of the song was in April 1994 on Australian radio station Triple J.

The album includes a hidden song which features a spoken word performance by the folk legend Roy Harper, who is a friend of the band.

== Release ==
On the cover is an american copy of a statue by William Wetmore Story called Angel of Grief, evidently damaged by an earthquake in 1906 and then restored in 1908. The original statue is located at the famous Cimitero Acattolico in Rome.

To commemorate the 20th anniversary of The Edges of Twilight, the Tea Party released a deluxe remastered CD, remastered LP, and a North American tour. The deluxe CD also includes a bonus disc that includes alternate, live, radio sessions and bonus audio and the booklet features the story of the album with new band interviews and previously unseen photos. A series of original artworks were commissioned by the band from Australian artist Robert Buratti which were released worldwide. Buratti also created a series of short films which were projected as a backdrop to the band while performing across Canada and Australia.

== Track listing ==
No.	Title	Length
1.	"Fire in the Head"	5:06
2.	"The Bazaar"	3:42
3.	"Correspondences"	7:28
4.	"The Badger"	3:58
5.	"Silence"	2:51
6.	"Sister Awake"	5:43
7.	"Turn the Lamp Down Low"	5:16
8.	"Shadows on the Mountainside"	3:39
9.	"Drawing Down the Moon"	5:26
10.	"Inanna"	3:48
11.	"Coming Home"	5:53
12.	"Walk with Me" (includes a spoken word piece by Roy Harper)	14:20

=== Deluxe Edition Bonus Disc ===
1. "Fire In The Head (Demo)" - 5:24
2. "The Bazaar (Demo)" - 3:35
3. "Walk With Me (Demo)" - 6:46
4. "Sister Awake (Demo)" - 5:39
5. "Drawing Down The Moon (Demo)" - 5:48
6. "Turn The Lamp Down Low (Alternate Blues Version)" - 3:29
7. "Correspondences (From The 'Alhambra' Tour Rehearsals)" - 6:47
8. "Sarode Bazaar (Previously Unreleased)" - 3:57
9. "Inanna (Acoustic Version)" - 3:18
10. "Silence (Acoustic Version)" - 3:55
11. "Shadows On The Mountainside (Triple J Session Live)" - 5:21
12. "The Bazaar (BBC Live Version)" - 4:07
13. "Sister Awake (Triple J Live At The Wireless)" - 8:01
14. "Time" - 6:59
15. "Turn The Lamp Down Low (BBC Live Version)" - 6:31

== Personnel ==
- Jeff Burrows – drums, cymbals, percussion
- Stuart Chatwood – bass guitars, piano, keyboards
- Jeff Martin – guitars, vocals, production at A&M Studios (Los Angeles)
- Roy Harper – spoken word
- Ed Stasium – recording, production and mixing
- Paul Hamingson – engineering
- Dave Collins – mastering at A&M Mastering (Los Angeles)
- Patrick Duffy – art direction and design

== Charts ==
Chart performance for The Edges of Twilight
Chart (1995)	Peak position
Australian Albums (ARIA)	8
New Zealand Albums (RMNZ)	27

=== Sales ===
Region	Certification	Certified units/sales
Canada (Music Canada)	Platinum	185,000
United States	—	27,000

== Sister Awake ==
"Sister Awake"
- Promo CD Single, CDPRO 1179, Canada

Single by The Tea Party

from the album The Edges of Twilight
- Released: 1996
- Recorded: A&M Studios (Los Angeles)
- Length: 5:43
- Label: EMI Music Canada
- Songwriter: The Tea Party
- Producers: Jeff Martin and Ed Stasium

The Tea Party singles chronology
"Shadows on the Mountainside" (1995)	"Sister Awake" (1996)	"Sister Awake Remix" (1996)

"Sister Awake" is a song by Canadian rock band The Tea Party. It was released as a promotional single in Canada. The music video was shot in Toronto and images from the video illustrate the booklet of the album Alhambra and its multimedia component. The song was remixed by Rhys Fulber for Alhambra.

"Sister Awake" is a standard three-piece rock composition acoustically based on 12-string guitar, sitar, sarod, harmonium and goblet drums. The song used 58 recording tracks by synching up three machines.

A semi-acoustic version with keyboard, goblet drums, harmonium and oud was recorded in August 1995 at Studio Morin Heights (Morin Heights) for Alhambra and appears on the European Triptych Special Tour Edition 2000 album.

=== Track listing ===
1. "Sister Awake (album version)"
2. "Sister Awake (edited)"

=== Sister Awake Remix ===
"Sister Awake Remix"
- Promo CD Single, CDRP 379, Australia

Single by The Tea Party

from the album Alhambra
- Released: 1996
- Recorded: A&M Studios (Los Angeles)
- Length: 4:37
- Label: EMI Music Canada
- Songwriter: The Tea Party
- Producers: Jeff Martin and Ed Stasium

The Tea Party singles chronology
"Sister Awake" (1996)	"Sister Awake Remix" (1996)	"Temptation" (1997)

"Sister Awake Remix" is a song by Canadian rock band The Tea Party. It was released as a promotional single in Australia. The song was remixed by Rhys Fulber at the Warehouse Studio, Vancouver for Alhambra. The original version appears on The Edges of Twilight.

==== Track listing ====
1. "Sister Awake (Remixed)"
