= Jeff Martin (Canadian musician) =

Canadian musician (born 1969)

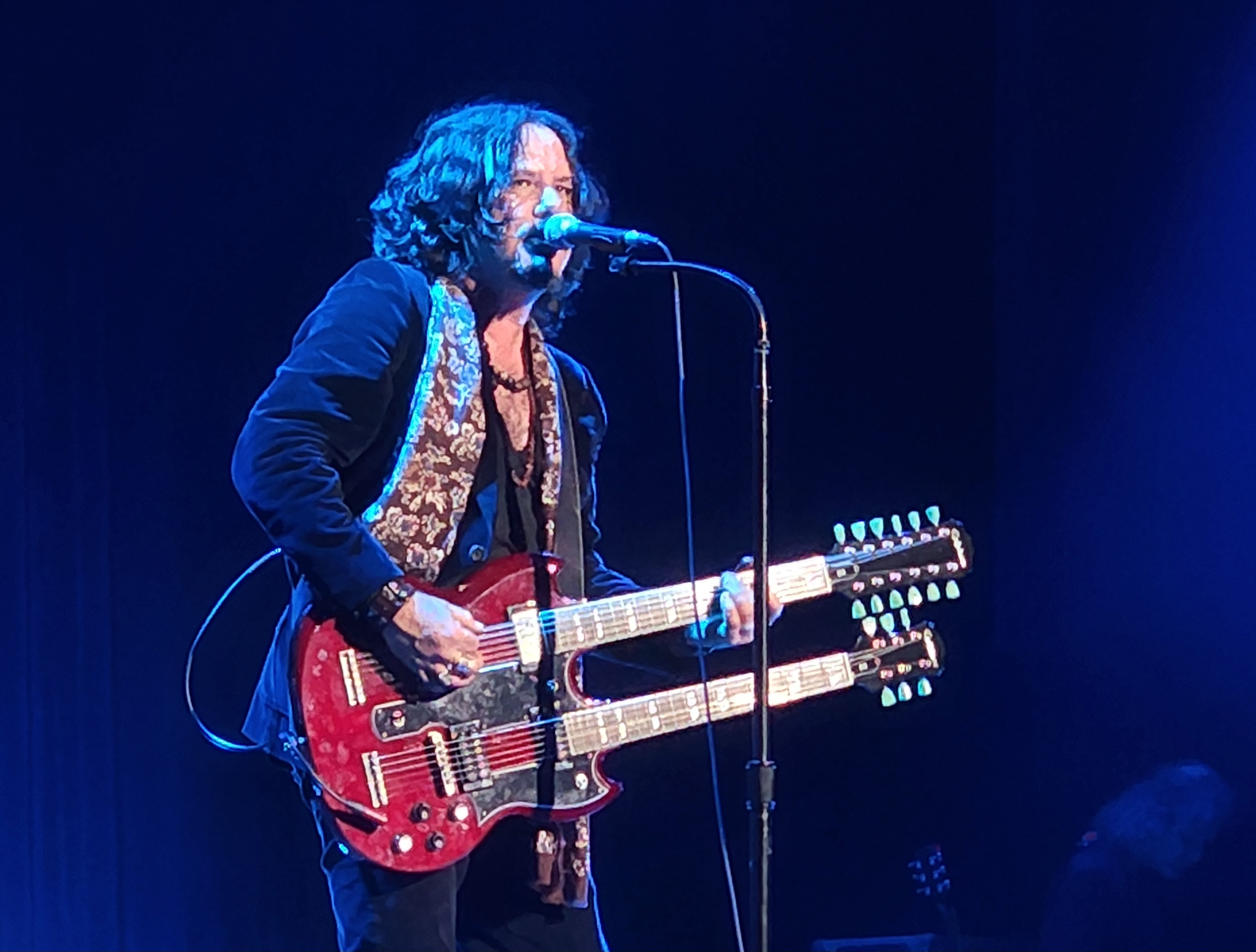
- Martin performing in 2023

Background information
- Born: Jeffrey Scott Brill; Windsor, Ontario, Canada
- Genres: Rock, hard rock, world, blues, pop, folk
- Occupations: Musician, songwriter, producer
- Instruments: Vocals, guitar
- Years active: 1990–present
- Labels: Koch, Shock
- Website: jeffmartinofficial.com

Jeffrey Scott Martin is a Canadian guitarist and singer, best known for fronting the rock band The Tea Party. He began his solo career in 2005, when The Tea Party went on hiatus.

== Biography ==
=== Early years ===
Martin grew up in Windsor, Ontario. began playing guitar as a child and in his adolescence played in bands The Shadows, Modern Movement, and The Stickmen. In 1988, Jeff graduated from Sandwich Secondary School along with future Tea Party bandmates Jeff Burrows and Stuart Chatwood. He went on to study music at the University of Windsor before leaving his studies prematurely due to philosophical differences with his music professor.

Martin has perfect pitch, as highlighted on "The Science of a Rock Concert", an episode of Daily Planet on Discovery Channel Canada. He also has synesthesia, as heard during an Alternate Tunings Guitar Workshop for Maton Guitars.

=== Professional career ===
==== The Tea Party (1990–2005, 2011–present) ====
Forming The Tea Party in 1990 after a marathon jam session at the Cherry Beach Rehearsal Studios in Toronto, Martin produced all of The Tea Party's albums, including their debut album in 1991, distributing it through the band's own label, Eternal Discs. In 1993 The Tea Party signed to EMI Music Canada and released their first major-label recording entitled Splendor Solis. Martin employed open tunings to imitate Indian instruments such as the sitar, something he has continued to employ throughout his career. Further developing The Tea Party's sound in 1995, The Edges of Twilight was recorded with an array of Indian and Middle-eastern instrumentation while Martin drew lyrical inspiration from occult themes and pagan influenced literature.

Upon returning from tours in Canada, Europe and Australia in 1996, The Tea Party went on to record Alhambra, an Enhanced CD which features acoustic re-recordings of songs from The Edges of Twilight, followed by a brief tour around Canada known as "Alhambra acoustic and eclectic".

Transmission, filled with dark and angry music, was released in 1997; it included Martin's first foray into electronica. Triptych followed in 1999; the first single "Heaven Coming Down" rose to #1 on Canadian radio. Lyrically, Martin was less enigmatic than he was on previous albums: on Triptych he wrote about the experiences of his years in the band.

In 1999, Martin performed as part of The White Ribbon Concert at the Phoenix Concert Theatre in Toronto. After releasing Tangents, a singles compilation, in 2000 and Illuminations, a DVD compilation of music videos which Martin remixed in Surround sound, The Tea Party released The Interzone Mantras in 2001 and Seven Circles in 2004. In October 2005, The Tea Party disbanded due to creative differences.

In 2011, the band members came together once again to perform a series of shows in their home country of Canada. The positive reception of these dates eventually led to the reforming of The Tea Party.

==== Solo career (2005–2008) ====
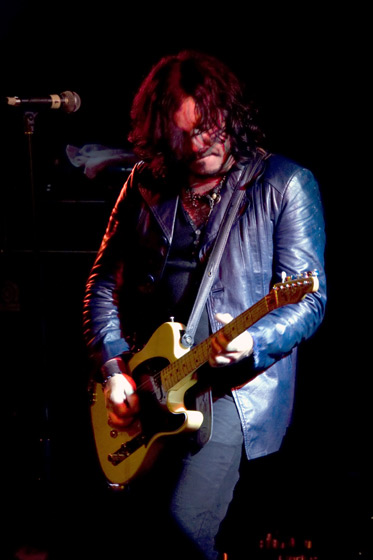
Jeff Martin & the Armada, November 2008

Martin's debut solo album titled Exile and the Kingdom was released in Canada and Australia in 2006. Among those who worked with Martin were Michael Lee and Ritesh Das (Toronto Tabla Ensemble). The first single, titled "The World is Calling", is an open letter to the Bush administration. During this time Martin was supposed to collaborate with Scott Stapp but it did not ensue. In November 2006, Martin released a live album recorded that September, titled Live in Brisbane 2006. The two-disc album features Ritesh Das and the Toronto Tabla Ensemble, and includes both solo and Tea Party songs. In May 2007, Martin released his second live album Live in Dublin recorded with drummer Wayne P. Sheehy, while Martin's first solo music DVD Live at the Enmore Theatre was released through Shock DVD in July 2007.

==== The Armada (2008–2010) ====
In early 2008 Martin (lead vocals, guitars) and Sheehy (drums) formed The Armada. The band's debut album, which features a similar sound to the Tea Party, was released on November 4, 2008.

==== Jeff Martin 777 (2010–present) ====
In 2010, Martin began work on new music with Jay Cortez and Malcolm Clark (formerly of The Sleepy Jackson) for a new album to be entitled "The Ground Cries Out" under the new band name of Jeff Martin 777. On January 10, 2011, the title track from the album was released on Martin's Myspace page. The Ground Cries Out was released in Canada on March 1, 2011, and has subsequently been released in Australia. Following a Jeff Martin 777 Canadian tour, the band toured Australia from May 2011. During the tour Martin announced a reunion of The Tea Party for some Canadian shows in July and August. Following the success of those shows, The Tea Party announced the reunion was permanent.

==== As a record producer ====
Martin was nominated as producer of the year at the 2000 Juno awards for his work with The Tea Party. Martin has produced albums for Hundred Mile House's EP, The Jay Murphy Band's Propaganda, and Tenth Planet's The Prophet Curse EP. He also played upon Roy Harper's The Green Man.

Martin produced the album Under A New Sun by Australian dark rock band The Eternal. The album features a duet with singer Mark Kelson on the track "The Sleeper".

He worked with Australian band Lepers and Crooks to produce their debut album in 2016.

Martin produced the debut EP Deep Down for Australian indie folk rock duo Secret Solis at River House Studios. On the record, he plays all the heavy guitars, hurdy gurdy and synths including his Theremin, and contributed vocals.

== Equipment ==
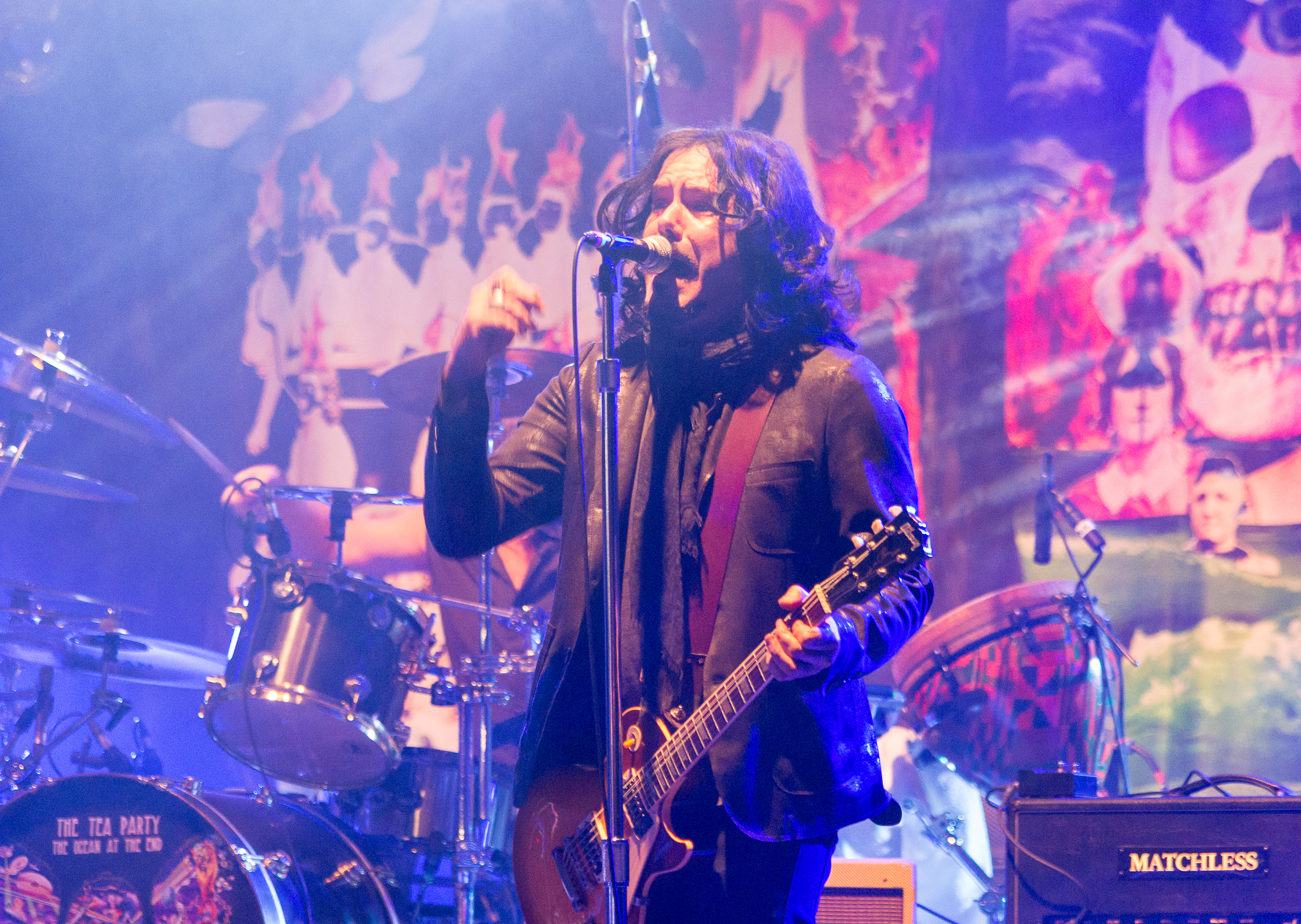
Jeff Martin performing, 2015

=== Guitars ===
- 1916 Gibson Harp guitar
- 1964 Gibson J-50 acoustic
- Gibson 12-string
- Three Les Paul Classic 1960 reissues
- Gibson 1971 Les Paul Recording
- Gibson EDS-1275
- Gibson Explorer
- 1971 Fender Telecaster Parsons White B-Bender
- Fender Stratocaster XII twelve string guitar
- Rickenbacker 360/12 JetGlo
- Danelectro
- Ellis Guitars 7 string resonator guitar
- Maton 12 string electro-acoustic guitar

=== Effects ===
- Dunlop Cry Baby
- Early 1970s Memory Man analog delay unit
- Reissue Small Stone
- Early 1960s Echoplex
- Matchless line switcher (with valves)
- DigiTech 2112 Effects processor unit
- TC Electronic G-Natural
- TC-Helicon VoiceWorksPlus

=== Amps ===
- Two Fender 100 watt combo
- Four Matchless Superchief 120 watt
- No Name 1960's Tube 25 watt
- Chute CC-04
- Urei 1176 leveling amp
- Teletronix LA-2A

== Discography ==
=== Studio albums ===
List of studio albums, with selected chart positions
Title	Album details	Peak chart positions
Title	Album details	AUS
Exile and the Kingdom	Released: April 11, 2006; Format: CD digital; Label: Koch Entertainment Canada, Shock Records	44

=== Live albums ===
List of live albums
Title	Album details
Live in Brisbane 2006	Released: November 2006; Format: 2×CD
Live in Dublin	Released: May 2007; Format: CD
Live at the Corner Hotel	Released: February 2008; Format: CD
Live & Acoustic	Released: 2016; Label: 93 Creative; Format: CD, digital

=== Video albums ===
List of video albums, with selected chart positions
Title	Album details	Peak chart positions
Title	Album details	AUS Music DVD
Live at the Enmore Theatre	Released: July 2007; Format: CD, digital; Label: Shock Records	32

=== Extended plays ===
List of EPs
Title	EP details
The Palace Volume 1: Sub Rosa	Released: 2015; Format: CD, digital
Stars in the Sand	Released: 2018; Format: CD, digital
Cinnamon Rose	Released: 2020; Format: CD, digital
