= The Tea Party (band) =

Canadian rock band

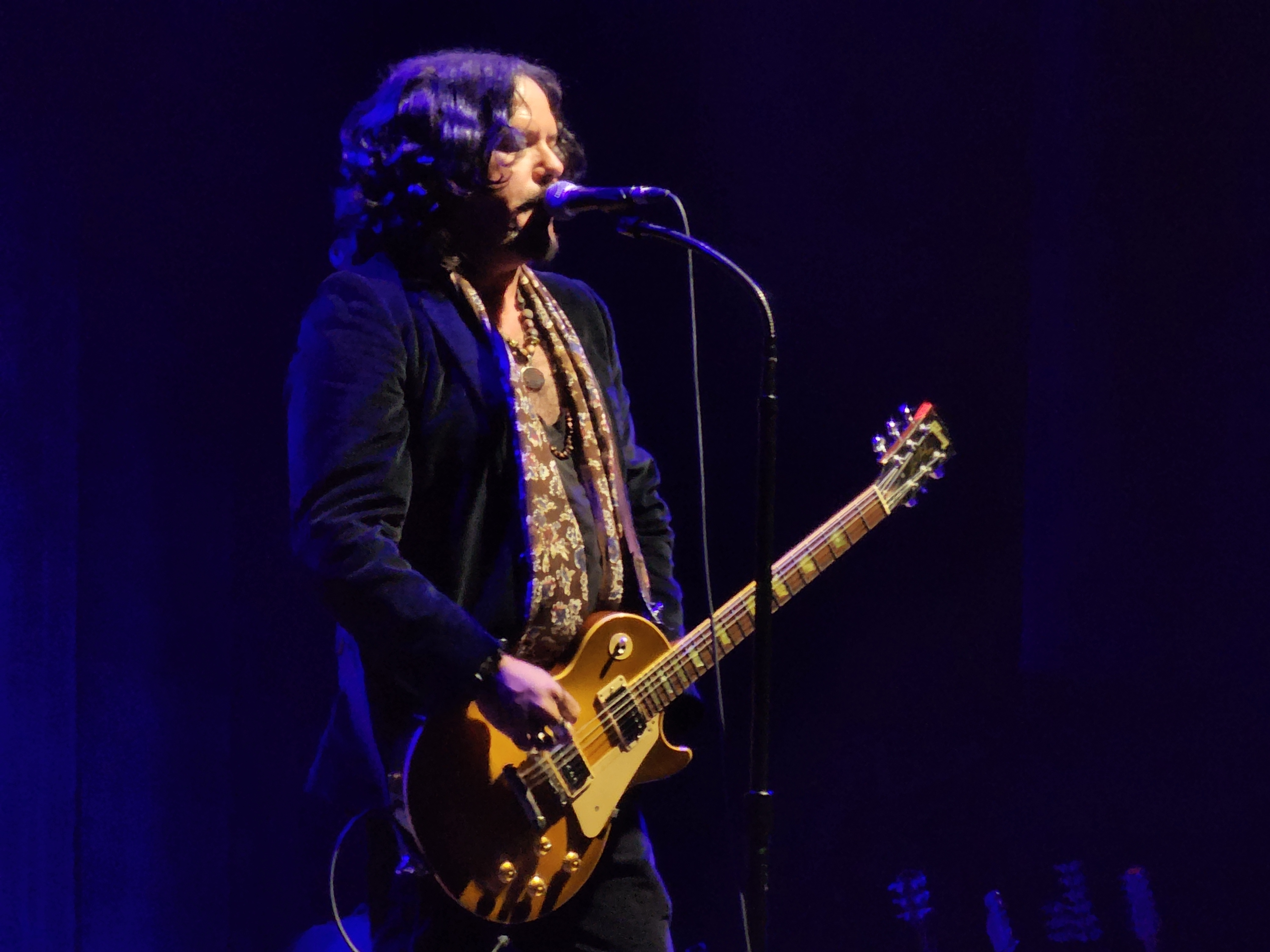
- Tea Party's frontman, Jeff Martin and rest of band members performing at Caesars Windsor in 2023

Background information
- Origin: Windsor, Ontario, Canada
- Genres: Alternative rock; progressive rock
- Years active: 1990–2005, 2011–present
- Labels: Anthem; EMI
- Members: Jeff Martin; Stuart Chatwood; Jeff Burrows
- Website: teaparty.com

The Tea Party is a Canadian rock band. Active throughout the 1990s and up until 2005, the band re-formed in 2011. The Tea Party released eight albums on EMI Music Canada. The band sold over three million records worldwide, including four double-platinum awards, one platinum and four gold albums in Canada. Between 1996 and 2016, The Tea Party was the 35th best-selling Canadian artist in Canada.

The Tea Party toured Canada on 21 occasions and Australia on twelve. In November 2002, the band toured Canada with symphony orchestras reinterpreting a decade's worth of shared songwriting. Breaking up in 2005 due to creative differences, the band members eventually re-united in 2011 to play several Canadian tour dates during the summer. The band decided to continue after the tour and has now re-formed.

The band has since released a double live album, recorded on their 2012 tour of Australia. Video shot during this tour was released as a Live DVD/Blu-ray, The Tea Party: Live from Australia in 2013. In September 2014, The Tea Party released their album, The Ocean at the End, and the following year a deluxe version of their album, The Edges of Twilight. In 2019, they released their EP Black River EP.

== History ==
=== Early years (1990–1995) ===
The Tea Party was formed in 1990 by Jeff Martin, Stuart Chatwood and Jeff Burrows after a marathon jam session at the Cherry Beach Rehearsal Studios in Toronto. Each member had previously played together during their teenage years in a number of different bands in Windsor, Ontario, where they were originally from. They had decided to name their new group The Tea Party after the infamous hash sessions of famous Beat Generation poets Allen Ginsberg, Jack Kerouac, and William Burroughs.

The Tea Party released their eponymous debut album in 1991, distributing it through their own label Eternal Discs. The album drew influences from psychedelic rock and blues, and was produced by Martin. Album production was something Martin would continue with for all of The Tea Party's albums; this was a way of giving the band complete artistic control. In 1993, The Tea Party signed to EMI Music Canada and released their first major label recording, Splendor Solis. The band employed open tunings and goblet drums (Dumbek) to create Indian-style sounds, something they continued to employ throughout their career, while continuing in a blues influenced style. In 1994 the album released in Australia, with the single "Save Me" launching the band's career in the country. The band gained the support of national radio station Triple J, enabling the band's first tour, with "Save Me" becoming a staple of their setlists.

=== Success (1995–2000) ===
Further developing The Tea Party's sound in 1995, The Edges of Twilight was recorded with an array of Indian and Middle-eastern instrumentation. "Sister Awake", the third single from the album, defines what the band set out to do, combining three-piece rock compositions with music from the world. "Sister Awake" is an acoustically based arrangement on 12-string guitar, sitar, sarod, harmonium, and goblet drums. The Edges of Twilight is The Tea Party's most commercially successful album; with sales exceeding 270,000 units, the album is certified double platinum in Canada and platinum in Australia.

In 1996, The Tea Party became the first Canadian band to play the main stage at Lollapalooza. Upon returning from successful tours in Canada, Europe and Australia in 1996, The Tea Party recorded Alhambra, an enhanced CD which features acoustic re-recordings of songs from The Edges of Twilight, and followed its release with a brief tour of Canada called "Alhambra Acoustic and Eclectic". English folk musician Roy Harper appeared on The Edges of Twilight reciting a poem and on Alhambra providing vocals for the song "Time".

Released in 1997, Transmission saw The Tea Party's first foray into industrial rock with a sampled world music foundation and thrust. Transmission is a collection of aggressive songs influenced by upheavals around the band; the firing of their management and the feeling of a lack of support from their record company. Epitomising the feelings were the first single "Temptation" and the album's title song.

Triptych followed in 1999; "Heaven Coming Down", the album's first single, rose to No. 1 on Canadian radio. The Tea Party's music took on a more orchestral sound, maturing from the blues base. Live at the Enmore Theatre, the band's first live album was released through Australian radio station Triple J during the band's tour for Triptych. In the fall The Tea Party toured in western Canada with Edwin.

=== Later years (2000–2005) ===
The band released a singles compilation called Tangents: The Tea Party Collection in 2000; that year the band was nominated for a Juno award for best musical group. They released a DVD compilation of music videos (which Martin remixed in surround sound) called Illuminations in 2001. It was recorded at Metalworks Studios in Mississauga, Ontario. The Tea Party released The Interzone Mantras later in 2001, and in November 2002 joined symphony orchestras across Canada in adapting their live show. The Interzone Mantras was recorded at Metalworks Studios in Mississauga, Ontario.

Seven Circles was released in 2004. Both The Interzone Mantras and Seven Circles saw the band return to their earlier sound with maturity.

In October 2005, The Tea Party disbanded due to creative differences, with Martin abruptly announcing he was beginning a solo career. Afterward Chatwood stated on the band's forum "that Jeff Burrows and myself are sincerely sorry for the way this was handled. As far as Jeff Burrows and myself were concerned, the band was taking an extended break."

=== Post-breakup (2006–2011) ===
In 2006, Chatwood continued to compose the Prince of Persia video game soundtracks for Ubisoft Montreal.

Burrows joined Rush's Geddy Lee and Alex Lifeson, and other Canadian musicians as drummer in the one-off project the Big Dirty Band. Burrows also presented during the midday shift on The Rock, a radio station in Windsor. In 2008, Burrows announced that he, Edwin, Mike Turner and Amir Epstein would form the band Crash Karma, recording their debut album in early 2009.

Martin moved to Ireland and recorded his debut solo album Exile and the Kingdom, which was released in Canada and Australia in 2006. He has toured parts of Europe, Canada and Australia, and released two live albums, Live in Brisbane 2006 and Live in Dublin, in November 2006 and May 2007, respectively. In August 2008, Martin announced the formation of his new band, The Armada. In 2010, The Armada broke up. Jeff Martin founded a new band called Jeff Martin 777 with Jay Cortez on bass and Malcolm Clark on drums. Their debut album The Ground Cries Out was released on 1 March in Canada and made it to No. 51 in the Canadian Albums Chart.

=== Reunion ===
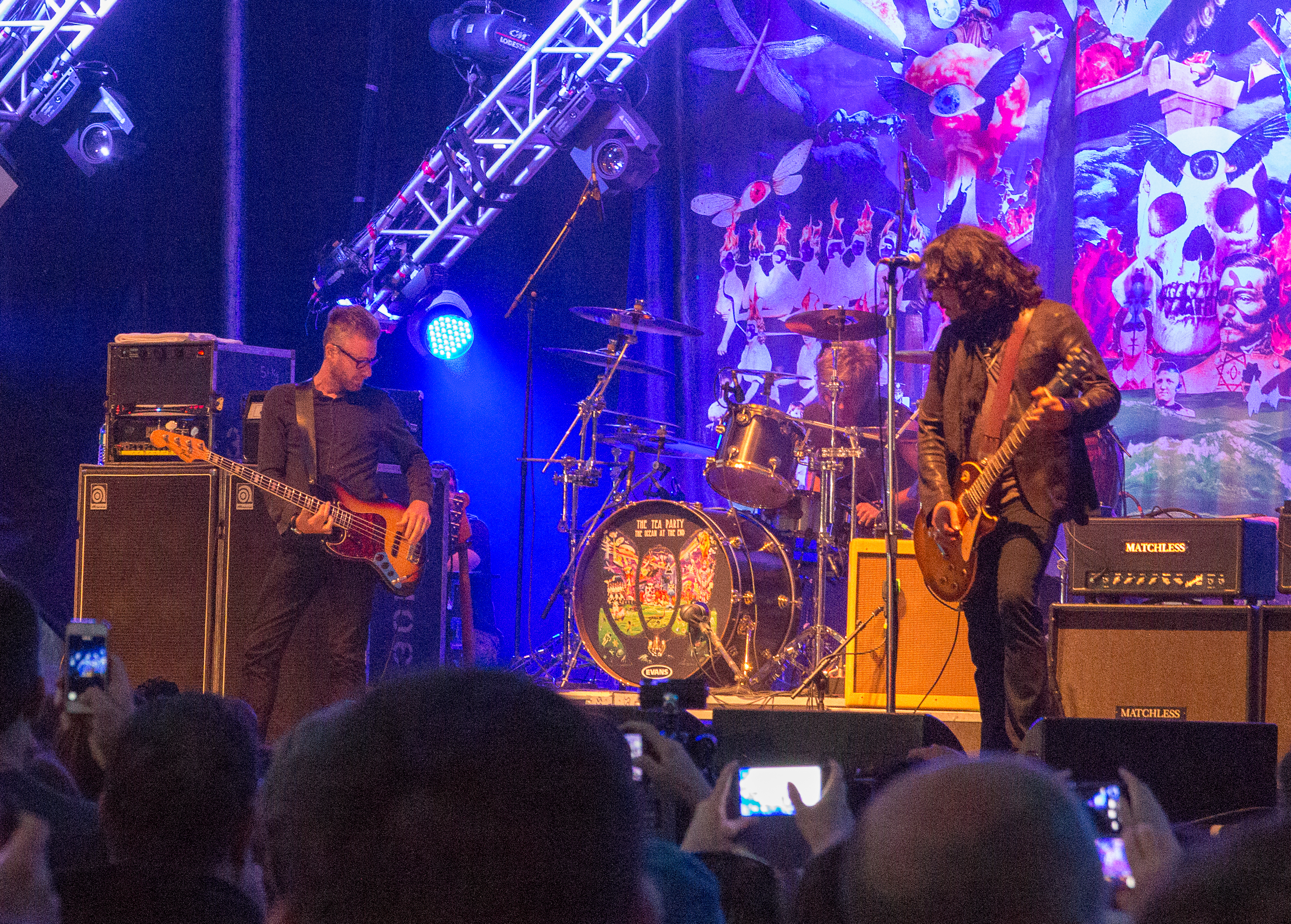
The Tea Party performing at the Sound of Music festival in Burlington, ON (June 2015)

On 12 April 2011, an official Facebook page was launched with a biography section that closed with "The band is scheduled to play a select number of dates in 2011. No other info was available at this time." The following day, the local radio station K106.3 announced the Sarnia Bayfest lineup including The Tea Party, which was later confirmed by drummer Jeff Burrows on his radio show on 13 April. Burrows further stated that a Canadian summer tour was in the works. The band played several shows in Canada over that summer.

On 6 August 2011, during a show in Lévis, the band had implied that they were going to be back together permanently. Martin said "We are the Tea Party and we're here to stay. And we're never going away again." In December of that year, during a show at the Métropolis in Montreal, the band announced that they would hopefully record a new album in 2012 and that there would be no more break up; Martin confirmed earlier implications by stating that "The Tea Party is back for good".

On 22 February 2013, The Tea Party announced on its website that "The band have convened in Australia to write and record the next chapter in the Tea Party saga. Stay tuned for more updates." On 19 March 2014, The Tea Party announced via its Facebook page that the title of their forthcoming album will be The Ocean at the End. It was officially released in Canada on 8 September 2014.

In October 2016, the band announced they would be going on a 30 date anniversary tour for their 4th studio album Transmission that was released 20 years ago. The tour began 3 February. They performed the album in its entirety along with some of their greatest hits.

The Tea Party promoted their Black River EP with two singles, releasing title track "Black River" in November 2018, followed by "Way Way Down" in June 2019. The EP released on 29 November 2019, contains both songs along with three new tracks and a Led Zeppelin cover.

On 26 April 2020, The Tea Party published a newly recorded cover of Joy Division's "Isolation" to their YouTube account. It coincided with COVID-19 pandemic isolation orders that much of the world was under to stop the spread of the virus. 6 July 2020 it was made available for digital download on the band's web site. It was followed by a second cover, "Everyday Is Like Sunday" by Morrissey, made available on streaming music services 29 May 2020.

The Tea Party scheduled a cross-country Saints and Sinners Tour 2020 for June and July, featuring Canadian co-headliners Sloan, Headstones, and Moist. With the COVID-19 pandemic forcing live venues to temporarily close, the tour was rescheduled for November 2021. The tour was later cancelled, and the announcement was made via the band's Twitter account.

== Website ==
In September 2011, Yahoo! reported that political groups associated with the Tea Party movement were trying to purchase the band's domain name. Stuart Chatwood stated "So much damage has been done to our name by the political movement that we're considering selling (The domain)". It is estimated the band could sell the domain for over $1M U.S. The band purchased the domain in 1993, and has since added the phrase "No politics... Just Rock and Roll" to their site in order to distance themselves from the political movement. On 15 October 2011, Sedo announced that they will be exclusively listing the domain for sale on their online marketplace. In February 2012, however, a post appeared on the website's news section that said: "The band has not sold teaparty.com."

== Musical style ==
Regarded as a progressive rock band, The Tea Party's style fuses "blues, industrial rock, and psych-blasted progressive rock with Middle Eastern influences." The band has described their style as "Moroccan-roll". Tuonela magazine described the band's style as "a very emotive style of alternative rock, with hints of grunge and even some touches of oriental music".

== Members ==
- Jeff Martin – vocals, guitar, sitar, sarod, oud, banjo, mandolin, dumbek, hurdy-gurdy, esraj, percussion, theremin
- Stuart Chatwood – bass guitar, guitar, keyboard instruments, harmonium, percussion, mandolin, tambura, cello, lap steel guitar, bass pedals
- Jeff Burrows – drum kit, percussion, djembe, goblet drums, tabla

== Discography ==
- The Tea Party (1991)
- Splendor Solis (1993)
- The Edges of Twilight (1995)
- Transmission (1997)
- Triptych (1999)
- The Interzone Mantras (2001)
- Seven Circles (2004)
- The Ocean at the End (2014)
- Blood Moon Rising (2021)

== Awards and nominations ==
The Tea Party were nominated for 22 MuchMusic Video Awards, and were awarded three People's Choice Awards for Favourite Music Video: two for "The River" and one for "The Bazaar". "Sister Awake" director Curtis Wehrfritz was nominated at the 1996 Juno Awards for Best Director; "Release" director Ulf Buddensieck won the Best Cinematography Award at the 1998 Juno Awards.

The Tea Party have been nominated for numerous JUNO awards over the band's career including Best Rock Album, Best Group, and Best Single. They have sold over 3 million records worldwide and have 4 Double platinum, 1 platinum and 4 gold albums certifications.

The band's recent single, "Black River" peaked at #3 on Active and Mainstream Rock, and Top 5 at Overall Rock.

== See also ==
- Canadian rock
- Music of Canada
- List of bands from Canada
