= Jason Samuels Smith =

American actor

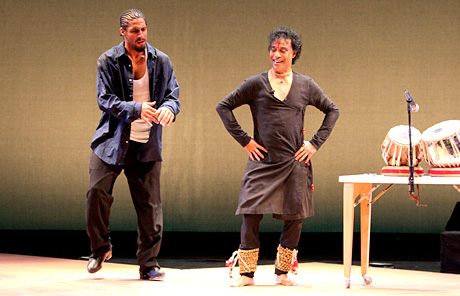
Jason Samuels Smith and Chitresh Das perform India Jazz Suites in 2009.

Jason Samuels Smith (born October 4, 1980) is an American tap dancer, choreographer, and director.

== Early life and career ==
Samuels Smith was born in New York City to professional performing arts parents Sue Samuels and JoJo Smith. He began his professional performing career at an early age through Frank Hatchett's Professional Children's Program at the Broadway Dance Center in New York City. At a young age, he had appearances on the television show Sesame Street, and at the age of 15, was understudy to the leading role in the Tony Award-winning Broadway show Bring in 'Da Noise, Bring in 'Da Funk.

== Awards and recognition ==
Samuels Smith won both an Emmy and American Choreography Award for "Outstanding Choreography" for the Opening number of the 2003 Jerry Lewis/MDA Telethon in a tribute to the late Gregory Hines. Samuels Smith was also awarded a Certificate of Appreciation by the City of Los Angeles for creating the First Annual Los Angeles Tap Festival in 2003 and received a proclamation declaring April 23 "Jason Samuels Day" from the City of Shreveport, Louisiana. In 2026, he was named a United States Artists (USA) Fellow.

== Credits ==
In 2004, Samuels Smith co-starred in Dean Hargrove's award-winning short film Tap Heat. He was also a featured dancer in HBO/Universal Pictures release of Outkast's feature film Idlewild. Debbie Allen has featured his dancing in several productions including the AMC television series Cool Women, Sammy (a tribute to the life of Sammy Davis Jr.), and in 1999 a leading role of Soul Possessed with Patti LaBelle, Arturo Sandoval, and Carmen DeLavallade. He also founded the tap dance program at the Debbie Allen Dance Academy in Culver City, California, which is also the location of the annual Los Angeles Tap Festival. In 2016, Smith narrated Simone Maurice’s documentary on tap dancing Lost in the Shuffle.

Other performance credits include:

- Fox Television's series So You Think You Can Dance (special guest performer)
- The New York City Center Fall For Dance Festival
- Sadler's Wells Sampled at Sadler's Wells in London
- Savion Glover's NYOTs (Not Your Ordinary Tappers)
- Cross Currents: Turned on Tap at the Queen Elizabeth Hall - South Bank in London
- The 2002-2003 Harlem Jazz Dance Festivals' TAAP: The Art and Appreciation of Percussion
- The NY Tap Committee/Town Hall's 21Below! with Jennifer Holliday
- Thank You Gregory: A Tribute to the Legends of Tap
- The American Institute of Vernacular Jazz Dance Darktown Strutters Ball Gala in 2010
- The Career Transition for Dancers 20th Anniversary Jubilee at The City Center, New York in 2005
- Special performances and choreography in Psych Season 5 Episode 2, "Feet Don't Kill Me Now".

Samuels Smith starred in the debut of Imagine Tap! at the Harris Theater in Chicago.

Samuels Smith performed in India Jazz Suites, a collaboration with Kathak Master Pandit Chitresh Das, and after Das died he danced with his Kathak disciple Seema Mehta. Kathak and tap dancing both use the feet with the major difference being footwear as Kathak is done bare foot.

He founded the tap company A.C.G.I. (Anybody Can Get It) as well as JaJa Productions band featuring original jazz-influenced hip hop music, with appearances throughout the United States.

He designed his own line of Bloch shoes in partnership with that company.
