= Joanna De Souza =

- Born: October 22, 1955 (age 70); Whitby, Ontario, Canada
- Occupations: Choreographer, Dancer, Teacher
- Known for: Kathak Dance
- Spouse: Ian De Souza
- Awards: Angikam's Dr. Maya Rao Award
- Website: www.kathaktoronto.com

Joanna De Souza (born October 22, 1955) is a Canadian Kathak choreographer, dancer, and teacher. She is the only Canadian-born artist to achieve a master's degree in Kathak dance through the Prayag Sangit Samiti, Allahabad, India.

== Early life ==
De Souza was born and raised in Whitby, Ontario. She started studying piano at the age of five, and as a teenager, was a member of an award-winning classical vocal group for nine voices, under the directorship of Marian Williams. She studied figure skating throughout her childhood but had no background in dance.

== Education ==
After studying Forestry for one year at Lakehead University in Thunder Bay, she moved to British Columbia, and then traveled to California in 1978, where she began studying Kathak under her first and current teacher, Pandit Chitresh Das. De Souza received her bachelor's and master's degrees in Kathak through the Prayag Sangeet Samiti, standing first in all of India.

== Career ==
In 1981, De Souza married tabla player, Ritesh Das. In 1988, they moved to Toronto and together, established M-DO/Kathak Toronto and the Toronto Tabla Ensemble. De Souza has performed across Canada, India, Pakistan, and Cuba, and has been the recipient of numerous grants and awards. She is now married to bassist and composer, Ian De Souza.

In 2015, she was awarded Angikam's Dr. Maya Rao Award for her innovative Kathak choreography.

== Achievements ==
- The only Canadian-born artist to achieve a master's degree in Kathak dance through the Prayag Sangit Samiti. - Founder of M-DO/Kathak Toronto and the Toronto Tabla Ensemble. - Twice nominated for the Dora Award. - Recipient of Angikam's Dr. Maya Rao Award for innovative choreography.

== Personal life ==
De Souza is married to Ian De Souza, a bassist and composer.
