= Sue Samuels =

American jazz dancer, choreographer, and teacher

- Occupations: Dancer; Choreographer; Teacher; Artistic director
- Years active: 1970s–present
- Known for: Co-founding JoJo’s Dance Factory; founding Jazz Roots Dance (2009)

Sue Samuels is an American jazz dancer, choreographer, and dance teacher based in New York City. A protégé of jazz master JoJo Smith, she co-founded JoJo’s Dance Factory in the 1970s—an independent studio that became a precursor to Broadway Dance Center (BDC)—and has taught on BDC’s faculty since the center opened in 1984. In 2009 Samuels founded the Jazz Roots Dance Company to preserve and present classic jazz repertory alongside her own choreography. She received a Dance Teacher Award in 2018 and a Dancers Over 40 Legacy Award in 2021, and has served on the selection committee for the New York Dance and Performance “Bessie” Awards.

== Career ==
=== Training and early career ===
Raised in Florida, Samuels trained in classical ballet before relocating to New York City as a teenager. In New York she studied jazz with Luigi, Nat Horne, Phil Black, and especially JoJo Smith, whose musicality and rhythmic approach became central to her style. She has credited her early ballet training—particularly emphasis on alignment and injury prevention—as an enduring influence on her teaching.

By the mid-1970s Samuels was working in New York’s commercial and theatrical dance scenes. On Broadway she appeared in the revue The Fifth Dimension with Jo Jo’s Dance Factory at the Uris Theatre (1974), and in the musical Got Tu Go Disco at the Minskoff Theatre (1979), where she danced in the ensemble and understudied the role of Lila.

=== JoJo’s Dance Factory and Broadway Dance Center ===
In the 1970s Samuels joined JoJo Smith in opening JoJo’s Dance Factory, one of New York’s early large, multi-teacher studios for drop-in classes. The studio functioned as a forerunner of Broadway Dance Center, and when BDC opened in 1984 Samuels became part of its regular faculty. Trade press also identifies her as a co-founder of JoJo’s Dance Factory and notes its connection to BDC’s subsequent development.

=== Jazz Roots Dance Company ===
Samuels founded Jazz Roots Dance Company in 2009. The troupe presents new choreography in a “classic jazz” idiom while reviving works by mid-20th-century jazz choreographers and by JoJo Smith.

=== Teaching and style ===
Samuels’ classes are noted for a ballet-based “jazz barre” warm-up and for live percussion accompaniment; she has long taught multiple levels of Broadway jazz at BDC. Her pedagogy emphasizes clean lines, rhythm, and musicality, a blend that trade publications have described as influential in training generations of musical-theatre dancers. Former students include performers such as Brooke Shields and Irene Cara.

== Awards and honors ==
- Dance Teacher Award (2018).
- Dancers Over 40 Legacy Award (2021).
- Flo-Bert Award (Tap Extravaganza®, 2015).
- Service on the Bessie Awards selection/steering committees (mid-2010s).

== Personal life ==
Samuels was married to choreographer JoJo Smith; they have two children, tap dancer Jason Samuels Smith and producer/arts manager Elka Samuels Smith. JoJo Smith, widely known for his work in Broadway and commercial dance, died in 2019.

== Selected stage credits ==
- The Fifth Dimension with Jo Jo’s Dance Factory (Uris Theatre, Broadway, 1974).
- Got Tu Go Disco (Minskoff Theatre, Broadway, 1979) – ensemble; understudy (Lila).

== Legacy ==
Trade publications have described Samuels as a “legendary” New York jazz teacher whose stylistic blend of ballet technique and jazz musicality has had long-term influence; she is frequently cited for her role in linking the 1970s jazz-dance generation with contemporary practice through both studio teaching and the repertory efforts of Jazz Roots Dance.

== See also ==
- Jazz dance
- Broadway Dance Center
