= The Millennium Dance Complex =

American dance studio

Coordinates: 34.163375°N 118.373955°W

- Type: Music and dance entertainment
- Founded: 1992
- Founder: AnnMarie Hudson
- Headquarters: Los Angeles, California
- Area served: United States, Canada, Europe, South America and Asia
- Website: millenniumdancecomplex.com

The Millennium Dance Complex is a dance studio founded in 1992 and located in the NOHO Arts District of Los Angeles until 2016, when it moved to Studio City. Dance Teacher magazine called Millennium "...one of the top schools in the country." Millennium offers daily drop-in classes in jazz dance, hip-hop, tap, and contemporary dance. Millennium is best known for its numerous dance videos on their YouTube channel. Performers such as Britney Spears, Janet Jackson, Justin Timberlake, Usher, Jennifer Lopez, Christina Aguilera, Kenny Ortega, P. Diddy, Beyoncé, Samuel, Monsta X, NCT 127, Ateez and Boy Story have taken classes or had rehearsals at the studio.

In 1988, Millennium's directors, AnnMarie Hudson and Robert Baker, met in Frank Hatchett's jazz-funk class on Broadway in Manhattan, New York City. AnnMarie had sold her small New Jersey dance school and relocated to New York. Her first job was in management at the newly formed Broadway Dance Center, working for its founder, Richard Elner. She started Millennium under the name Moro Landis Studios because of the historical dance building which it occupied. Millennium's faculty is composed of choreographers including Marty Kudelka, David Moore, Matt Steffanina, Tricia Miranda, Brian Friedman, and Kyle Hanagami.

== Branches ==
=== United States ===
- Los Angeles, California
- Orange County, California
- Las Vegas, Nevada
- Miami, Florida
- Nashville, Tennessee
- Salt Lake City, Utah
- Denver, Colorado

=== Asia ===
- Shanghai, China
- Beijing, China

=== Europe ===
- Cologne, Germany

=== South America ===
- São Paulo, Brazil

== See also ==
- Broadway Dance Center
- Dance in the United States
