= Eva Von Gencsy =

Hungarian-Canadian dancer and choreographer

- Born: 11 March 1924; Csongrád, Hungary
- Died: 11 April 2013 (aged 89); Montreal, Quebec, Canada
- Occupations: Dancer, choreographer, teacher, artistic director
- Dancing career
- Former groups: Royal Winnipeg Ballet, Les Grands Ballets Canadiens, Les Ballets Jazz de Montreal

Eva von Gencsy (11 March 1924 – 11 April 2013) was a dancer, choreographer and teacher. After immigrating to Canada from Europe she performed with prominent Canadian dance companies Royal Winnipeg Ballet and Les Grands Ballets Canadiens. After discovering jazz dance she founded a new style of dance called ballet-jazz. She created Les Ballets Jazz de Montréal in 1972 and became their first artistic director. After leaving the company she continued to teach and showcase her new style of dance across Canada and around the world. She died in Montreal of complications due to cardiac arrest.

== Biography ==
=== Early life and career ===
Eva von Gencsy was born on 11 March 1924 in Csongrád, Hungary. Her father was a school principal.

Von Gencsy received her training in classical ballet at the Troyanoff Russian Ballet Academy in Budapest and started touring with Varga Troyanoff's company at the age of 14. She then studied theatre at Szineszegyesuleti Iskola Theatre School from 1941-1944. After World War II she became principal dancer of the Salzburg Landes Theatre from 1945-1947.

=== Move to Canada ===
In 1948, Von Gencsy moved to Winnipeg, Manitoba, Canada, working as a domestic servant. During this time she joined the Winnipeg Ballet (later renamed Royal Winnipeg Ballet) and received a teaching diploma from the Royal Academy of Dance. In 1953, she moved to Montreal and worked at Radio-Canada. She later joined Les Ballets Chiriaeff (later renamed Les Grands Ballets Canadiens). During this time she met Brian Macdonald who introduced her to jazz dance. In the summer, she explored jazz dance by taking classes in New York City with Eugene Louis Faccuito. She later became an assistant to Macdonald at the Banff School of Fine Arts.

=== Ballet-jazz ===
In Montreal, Von Gencsy developed a new style of dance called ballet-jazz. In 1972, she co-founded Les Ballets Jazz de Montréal with Eddy Toussaint and Geneviève Salbaing and became the company's first artistic director. The founders' relationship quickly deteriorated when Von Gencsy and Toussaint wanted to maintain the classical ballet style in the company's repertoire while Salbaing wanted to choreograph dances that would appeal to mainstream audiences. Von Gencsy left the company in 1978.

Von Gencsy taught ballet-jazz in various venues around the world, including the Centre de Danse Rosella Hightower in France and Opera Ballet School in Switzerland. From 1991 to 1994 she was a faculty member of the Ballet Akademie des Tanzes in Cologne.

=== Death ===
On April 3, 2013, Von Gencsy was at Cinémathèque Québécoise to celebrate Les Ballets Jazz de Montreal's fortieth anniversary. During an introduction for two of her works, she suffered a heart attack. She was revived and admitted to the Hôtel-Dieu hospital, but died eight days later on April 11.

== Dance style ==
Von Gencsy was inspired by a desire to merge her ballet training with the freedom of the jazz dance style. The result was ballet-jazz, a hybrid of ballet and jazz dance. This style is characterised by sexy shapes, specific, strong use of the limbs, loose hips and off-beat movement that is percussive. Eddy Toussaint, a student of Gencsy, stated, "To Eva [Von Gencsy], ballet-jazz was a celebration of the soul as well as the body."

Von Gencsy often added ballet techniques to the jazz dance she learned from New York jazz teachers Eugene Louis Faccuito, JoJo Smith and Phil Black. For example, instead of using parallel feet like her jazz teachers she would use turned-out feet.

== Politics ==
Von Gencsy was actively interested in politics and self-identified as a Liberal. She was strongly against Quebec's separation from Canada, even though she respected French-Canadian heritage.

== Awards ==
- Queen's Medal for Artistic Achievement (1977)
