= DBPC =

DBPC may refer to:

- Butylated hydroxytoluene (2,6-ditertiary-butylparacresol), an antioxidant
- Don Bosco School, Park Circus
- DBus for process control
- Double-blind, placebo-controlled trial, a type of randomized controlled trial, usually of pharmaceuticals
