= FoodPharmer =

Indian health and nutrition influencer

Revant Himatsingka
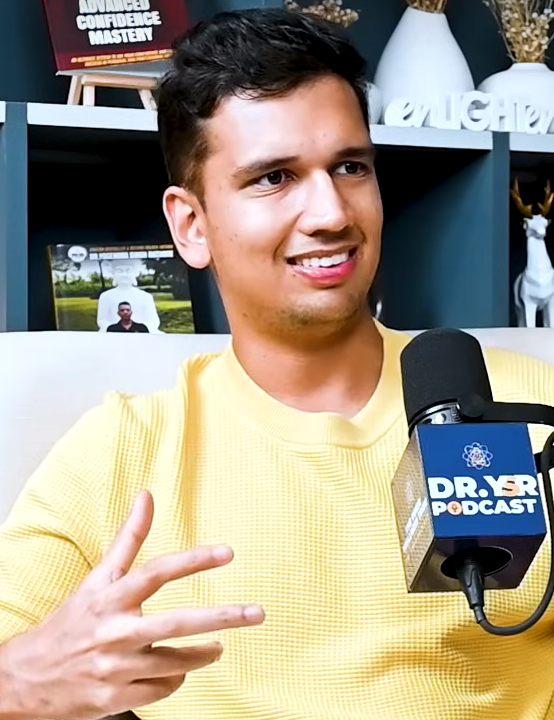
- Himatsingka in 2024
- Born: 29 February 1992 (age 34); Kolkata, West Bengal, India
- Education: NYU Stern School of Business; The Wharton School

Instagram information
- Page: foodpharmer
- Genres: Health and nutrition
- Followers: 4.85 million (Instagram, YouTube, X, Facebook, LinkedIn) (19 July 2025)

YouTube information
- Channel: Foodpharmer
- Subscribers: 1,250,000

Revant Himatsingka, better known as FoodPharmer, (Note: His pseudonym is variously formatted as "Food Pharmer", "Foodpharmer" or "FoodPharmer".) is an Indian health advocate. He is known for spreading awareness of clean eating choices and reading food labels in a humorous manner. His notable achievements are starting the 'Sugar Boards' and 'Oil Boards' that were adopted by Indian Schools. Ranked 15th in Forbes India's "Top 100 Digital Stars" of 2024, he began his career as an author and consultant before transitioning to social media. He gained prominence after a viral video in 2023 that criticised the high sugar content in Bournvita, sparking regulatory actions and industry reforms. Operating independently, he campaigns against misleading food practices. His activism has influenced product reformulations and public discourse on food standards in India. He has also been at the centre of several legal battles filed by major FMCG companies in India. To significantly reduce the protein deficiency in India, he started his own food company, named OWN(Only What's Needed - link: onlywhatsneeded/). The name was completely chosen by his followers, and the products are democratically chosen, with high transparency level. With 0 Rs. spent on it marketing, the product - protein - was a massive success.

== Early and personal life ==
Revant Himatsingka was born into a Kolkata-based upper-middle-class Marwari family. His father was a business owner and his mother was a homemaker. He completed his schooling from Don Bosco School, Park Circus. He graduated in finance from NYU Stern School of Business and did his MBA at The Wharton School. He then worked as a consultant at McKinsey & Company, during which time he also completed a course in nutrition. He has authored a book and has delivered TEDx talks and speeches at several educational institutions.

He quit his job in April 2023 and returned to Kolkata after 13 years in the US and UK. He has since moved to Mumbai due to its status as India's financial capital and due to the difficulty of travelling from Kolkata to speak at various functions and events there. He has stated that he and his family feel concerned about him because of financial, legal, and potential physical threats due to the nature of his work.

== Career as health advocate ==
Himatsingka initially began his social media career to promote his book, Selfienomics, before transitioning to FoodPharmer. His current pseudonym, "FoodPharmer", is the concatenation of the words "Food" and "Pharmer", which itself is a portmanteau of "pharma" and "farmer".

After quitting his US job, on 1 April 2023, he posted a video on Bournvita's high sugar content and its impact on children. He claimed that the product marketed as a health drink for children contains almost 50% sugar and adversely impacts the health of children, is addictive, and promotes diabetes. He was served a legal notice from Mondelez, the parent company of Bournvita, and forced to take the video down. His Twitter account was also permanently suspended. However, his video went viral on social media and had over 12 million views on Instagram before being taken down. It also earned him over 100,000 followers within a few days on the platform. The video was shared by several celebrities, politicians and also featured on various TV news channels. In response to this, the National Commission for Protection of Child Rights (NCPCR) ordered Bournvita to withdraw its misleading packaging and advertisements, and the Indian government ordered that it be removed from 'health drinks' category on e-commerce sites. Bournvita eventually relented and reduced sugar content in the product.

He continued making videos critical of several FMCGs such as Dabur, Lay's, Knorr, Nestle, Kissan, Nutella, PepsiCo, Red Bull, among others, and earned more than a million followers on Instagram in six months. His movement has been backed by several experts and supported by some celebrities. Several companies have since reduced the sugar content of their products and marketers have changed their taglines as a response to his videos. However, he has also been served with numerous lawsuits from several brands including Dabur and PepsiCo. Some of his videos were also taken down by social media sites.

Following a joint report by Public Eye and IBFAN that Nestle's Cerelac has significantly higher sugar content in economically disadvantaged regions, such as India, compared to Europe, Himatsingka stressed the need for stricter enforcement rules in India as in Europe. The World Health Organization (WHO) recommends against added sugars for children below two years of age. He also raised his concerns about the high sodium content of upma, poha and dal chawal in IndiGo flights. He stated that high altitude reduces the sensitivity of taste buds, thus most airlines add excess salt to the food but also recognised that high sodium may result in hypertension, heart and kidney issues. The airline said that its food products maintain strict quality standards and follow all FSSAI guidelines. He has also criticised the use of maida in bread and biscuits, the high sugar in ketchup, flavoured drinks for children, and energy drinks as well as the use of palm oil, artificial food colouring, and several other ingredients in food products.

He has accused pharmacies of selling fake oral rehydration solution (ORS). He claimed that pharmacies often sell drinks that do not follow WHO-recommended standards instead of actual ORS. He said that such drinks are often approved by the FSSAI but have higher sugar and lower electrolyte content compared to the standards recommended by the WHO. In 2024, he assisted Rajya Sabha MP Sudha Murty on the impact of food adulteration during the Monsoon and Winter sessions of the parliament. He is known for spreading awareness on clean eating choices and reading of food labels in a humorous manner. He has launched Label Padhega India campaign to encourage the practice of reading food labels on packaged products. He is operating his movement from his savings in the US. He has declined offers from several companies to promote their products. He scripts and shoots his videos himself and has one employee. He relies upon pro-bono lawyers to fight the lawsuits against him. Recently he launched a food startup called Only What's Needed™, the startup has been in news for involving people in the decision making by giving their votes on social media asked by Food Pharmer or Revant Himatsingka. Surprisingly even the name of the startup "Only What’s Needed™" was decided by public votes.

== Impact and influence ==
Himatsingka was ranked 15th in Forbes India's "Top 100 Digital Stars" list of 2024. He was one of the creators nominated in "Disrupter of the Year" category at the National Creators Award 2024, but he did not win. Some people have also expressed their willingness to donate to his cause.

Following the virality of his first video in April 2023, critical of sugar and other contents in Bournvita, which is marketed as a health drink for children, its parent company, Mondelez, sent a legal notice to Himatsingka calling his video "unscientific" and accusing him of "distorting facts", forcing him to take the video down and to issue a public apology. The company further contended that Bournvita contains "vitamins A, C, D, Iron, Zinc, Copper, and Selenium which help build immunity" and that the suggested serving contains much less sugar than the recommended daily sugar intake for children. The company asserted that the formulation was created by food scientists and nutritionists and that all regulations have been followed. However, the Indian government and NCPCR intervened and ordered Bournvita to withdraw misleading promotional material. The company eventually reduced sugar content in the drink by approximately 15%, from 37.4 grams of added sugar per 100 grams of powder to 32.2 grams per 100 grams, in December 2023.

Regarding his videos on Mondelez's Bournvita and Tang, the Delhi High Court, in its interim order, has stated that Himatsingka may continue making factual statements in his videos or posts, but may not create "disparaging" videos on the company and its products. He has later stated in the court that he will request the takedown of an interview where he is alleged to have violated the court's injunction on making remarks against Bournvita. The NCPCR has prohibited the use of the term "health drink" for beverages consumed by children that have added flavours. This has resulted in the removal of Bournvita, Horlicks, and several other beverages from the "health drink" category of E-commerce websites.

He criticised the usage of "100% juice" label used by Real to market its products despite not being 100% fruit juice. Real's parent company Dabur reacted by sending him a legal notice. Meanwhile, Food Safety and Standards Authority of India banned the use of "100% juice" label on these products. As a response to his criticism of sugar content in Maggi's Rich Tomato Ketchup, Nestle announced a change in the recipe of the product to reduce sugar by 22% and to have more tomatoes in it than sugar. His criticism of Lay's chips resulted in the company switching to sunflower oil for producing chips. Recently CBSE and ICSE Boards also made Sugar Board–a movement started by FoodPharmer or Revant Himatsingka as mandatory in all their affiliated schools. He was appreciated by notable figures like CEO of Zerodha, Nithin Kamath for the same.

== See also ==
- Added sugar
  - Sugary drink tax
- Food preservation
- List of food labeling regulations
- Nutrition facts label
- Standards of identity for food
