= Bloch (company) =

Australian dance shoes manufacturer

- Industry: Manufacturing
- Founded: 1932
- Founder: Jacob Bloch
- Headquarters: Sydney, New South Wales, Australia
- Products: Dance supplies
- Website: bloch.com.au

Bloch is an Australian-based manufacturer of pointe shoes and other types of dance shoes, dance costumes, and dance fashion accessories.

== History ==
The Bloch company was founded by Jacob Bloch, a cobbler who emigrated from Lithuania to Australia in 1931. Bloch began making pointe shoes in a workshop in Paddington, Sydney in 1932, when he noticed a ballet dancer struggling to stay en pointe and offered to make her an improved pair of shoes. Later, he made custom ballet shoes for Tamara Toumanova, David Lichine, Helene Kirsova, and other visiting Russian ballet dancers. With the expanding popularity of his product, Bloch began selling his pointe shoes throughout Australia.

The company has since expanded its product line with the addition of dance and street apparel and accessories. Today, Bloch's corporate headquarters are located in Sydney, Australia, with a European head office in London. It operates one flagship store and 14 other stores across Australia, European stores in London, Paris, Amsterdam, Warsaw, and one US store in New York; all other sales are conducted through independent retailers.

== Products ==
Bloch manufactures various types of shoes, including pointe shoes, ballet flats, jazz shoes, character and tap shoes, ballroom shoes, dance sneakers, barre shoes, and fashion flats, as well as a wide range of dance apparel, gymnastics, and activewear.

Bloch has been the official pointe shoe supplier to The Australian Ballet since 2012.

In January 2024, Bloch acquired RP Collection (formerly Russian Pointe).

== Pointe shoe manufacturing ==
Bloch employs a pointe shoe manufacturing method known as turnshoe. Bloch's pointe shoes use three different recipes of paste in the box of the pointe shoe. The standard paste, "paste A", is a firm, hard paste that was formulated to withstand varying heat and humidity. "Paste B" is more malleable and thus allows the shoe to more quickly mold to the shape of the foot; because of its high malleability, this paste breaks down (i.e., shoe structural support degrades) faster than paste A. A third recipe, known as "TMT" or "Thermo-Morph Technology" paste, is a heat-activated material that allows the shoe to be molded to the foot when subjected to directed hot air from a hair dryer.

== See also ==
- Sportswear (activewear)
