= Bournvita =

Cadbury brand of malted drink mixes

- Product type: Drink mix
- Current owner: Mondelez International
- Produced by: Cadbury
- Country: England
- Introduced: 1920s
- Markets: United Kingdom; North America; India; Nepal; Bangladesh; Nigeria; Benin; Togo

Bournvita is a brand of malted and chocolate malt drink mixes manufactured by Cadbury, a subsidiary of Mondelez International. It is sold in the United Kingdom and North America, as well as India, Nepal, Bangladesh, Nigeria, Benin, and Togo. Bournvita was developed in England in the late 1920s and was marketed as a health food. The original recipe included full-cream milk, fresh eggs, malt, edible rennet casein and chocolate. (Note: "Bournvita is a little more complicated. The cocoa is mixed with malt, glucose, sugar and egg, the resultant 'goo' being pumped into a continuous vacuum band drier. When dried the result is a 'honeycomb' sheet which when granulated can be packed as Bournvita.") It was first manufactured and sold in Australia in 1933. Bournvita was discontinued in the UK market in 2008 but has since been reintroduced and is now available in limited supermarkets such as the Co-op. The drink was named by Cadbury which was derived from Bournville, the model village which is the site of the Cadbury factory (Bourn + Vita). It was first sold in India in 1948, the year Cadbury India was established.

== Controversies ==
=== FoodPharmer controversy ===
Until 2023, Bournvita was marketed in India as a 'health drink' which 'improves children's growth and development', despite having high sugar and other components that may adversely affect children's health. In April 2023, YouTuber Revant "FoodPharmer" Himatsingka released a video targeting the company for misleading advertisement, claiming that the drink contains almost 50% sugar and adversely impacts the health of children, is addictive, and promotes diabetes. Bournvita's parent company Mondelez reacted by sending the influencer a legal notice, calling his video 'unscientific' and forcing him to take his video down and issue a public apology. However, his video had already been viral before being taken down, having reached more than 12 million views on Instagram. The video was shared by several celebrities, politicians and also featured on various TV news channels.

The National Commission for Protection of Child Rights ordered Bournvita to withdraw all misleading packaging and advertisements, and the Indian government ordered that the 'health drink' category be removed from e-commerce sites. Representatives from Mondelez India also stated to the NCPCR that Bournvita is not a 'health drink'. Bournvita eventually reduced its sugar content by almost 15%.

Regarding his videos on Mondelez's Bournvita and Tang, the Delhi High Court, in its interim order, has stated that Himatsingka may continue making factual statements in his videos or posts, but may not create 'disparaging' videos on the company and its products. He has later stated in the court that he will request the takedown of an interview where he is alleged to have violated the court's injunction on making remarks against Bournvita.

== See also ==
- List of chocolate drinks
