= Ritesh Das =

- Born: Ritesh Das; 9 June 1957 (age 69); Kolkata, West Bengal, India
- Occupations: Composer, Teacher
- Instrument: Tabla
- Years active: 1991–present
- Member of: Toronto Tabla Ensemble
- Website: torontotabla.com

Ritesh Das (born 9 June 1957 in Kolkata, India) is a tabla player who has been teaching and composing music since the early 1970s. He is the founder and artistic director of the critically acclaimed Toronto Tabla Ensemble.

== Biography ==
=== Early life ===
Ritesh Das was born in Kolkata, West Bengal to parents Nrityacharya Prohlad Das and Smt. Nilima Das. He is the brother of renowned Kathak dancer, Late Pandit Chitresh Das. Das graduated from Don Bosco High School in 1975 and went on to study commerce at City College, Kolkata from 1976 to 1978. His parents opened a music and dance academy, Nritya Bharati, the first of its kind in Kolkata, which allowed him immediate exposure to music and tabla at a young age. His musical studies began in 1972, studying tabla with Pandit Shankar Ghosh, vocals with T.L. Rana, and sitar with M.D. Mullick. When Das was 22 years old, he moved to Los Angeles, USA, to be a part of the AMAN Folk Ensemble. While in California, he served an apprenticeship under Zakir Hussain and then began studying tabla with his current guru, Pandit Swapan Chaudhuri at the Ali Akbar College of Music.

=== Toronto Tabla Ensemble (1991–present) ===
In 1987, Das moved to Toronto where he began teaching tabla on a full-time basis. In 1991, he formed the Toronto Tabla Ensemble. Along with the ensemble, he has nationally toured Canada six times as well as touring Australia in 2006 and India in 2011. They have performed at numerous jazz and folk festivals, and have also appeared on CBC News Network and Much Music. In 2000, their album, Firedance, received a nomination for the Juno Award for Best Global Album. Along with the Ensemble, Das has released eight CDs to date and is currently composing music for the Ensemble's ninth CD. In 2016 Ritesh Das was awarded the Roy Thomson Hall Award of Recognition through Toronto Arts Foundation. Das served on the music committee of the Toronto Arts Council from 1996 to 1998.

=== Nritya Bharati Global, Ritesh Das Academy for Indian Arts ===
Das is the director of the Toronto Tabla Ensemble School of Tabla, with 3 teaching locations in the Greater Toronto Area. His classes are designed to produce professional tabla players, as many of his students have become. Das recently launched the first Toronto Tabla Youth Ensemble featuring young artists between 8 and 15 years of age who he continues to train. In 2014, Das founded the Indian Diaspora Festival, a yearly event which features artists of Indian music and dance trained in the West. In addition to tabla classes, Ritesh Das also hosts kathak, orissi and yoga classes, as well as workshops, and small performances at his Centre for Indian Arts.

== Discography ==
=== Toronto Tabla Ensemble ===
- Toronto Tabla Ensemble (1996)
- Rupehli Tarannum - LP of Ismaili Geets with Anaar Kanji & Pt. Krishna Mohan Bhatt (1983)
- Second Palla (1998)
- Firedance (2000)
- Weaving (2002)
- Compilations (2007)
- Alankar (2008)

=== Selected performing experience ===
1992–present Founder and artistic director, Toronto Tabla Ensemble

1987–present Various solo appearances

1988–2011 Founding member, Artistic co-director, M-DO Kathak Toronto

2006–2009 Toured Canada, USA, Europe, Australia with Jeff Martin and The Tea Party

1994–1995 Founding member, composer, performer, Humdrum Toronto

1979–1985 Lead Percussionist, AMAN Folk Ensemble Los Angeles, California

=== Selected recent activity ===
2016 Received Roy Thomson Hall Award of Recognition

2016 Celebrated 25 Years of Toronto Tabla Ensemble with a pair of Concerts at the Harbourfront Centre in Toronto

2015 Collaboration concerts with Japanese Taiko group: Nagata Shachu

2014 Founded Indian Diaspora Festival

2014 Music licensed for documentary: ‘No easy walk to freedom’ by Nancy Nicol

2012, 2013 Music licensed for TD Bank Visa commercials

2011 Music licensed for Aga Khan Museum website

2008 Composed opening music for CBC Metro Morning News
