= Rakesh Gangwal =

American businessman

- Born: 25 July 1953 (age 73); Kolkata, West Bengal, India
- Citizenship: American
- Education: Indian Institute of Technology Kanpur (B.Tech); University of Pennsylvania (MBA)
- Occupation: Businessman
- Known for: Co-founder and owner of IndiGo, Former Chair of Southwest Airlines
- Spouse: Married
- Children: 1

Rakesh Gangwal (born July 1953) is an Indian-American billionaire businessman. He is the co-founder of IndiGo Airlines alongside Rahul Bhatia. He is the former chief executive officer (CEO) and chairman of US Airways Group, having served in that role from 1998 to November 27th, 2001. From June 2003 to August 2007, Gangwal was the chairman, president, and chief executive officer of Worldspan Technologies, a provider of travel technology and information services to the travel and transportation industry. From 2002 to 2003, Gangwal was involved in various personal business endeavors, including private equity projects and consulting projects. He was the president and CEO of US Airways Group from 1998 until his resignation in 2001. In November 2024, Gangwal was appointed chair of the Southwest Airlines corporate board until stepping down eight months later.

== Early life ==
Gangwal was born in July 1953 in a Jain family based in Kolkata, India. He attended Don Bosco School, Park Circus before earning a bachelor's degree in Mechanical Engineering from the Indian Institute of Technology Kanpur in 1975, and an MBA degree from the Wharton School of the University of Pennsylvania.

== Career ==
After completing his bachelor's degree from IIT Kanpur at the age of 23, Gangwal moved to the United States in 1977. His association with the airline industry began in September 1980, when, as an associate of Booz Allen Hamilton, he worked closely with United Airlines. In 1984, Gangwal joined United as the manager for strategic planning. He held a series of positions there.

Prior to joining US Airways, Gangwal served as executive vice president for Air France beginning in November 1994. Previously, Gangwal had been a financial analyst in the product development group of Ford Motor Company and a production and planning engineer with Philips India Ltd.

Gangwal has served on the board of advisers of the University of Colorado Denver, the board of trustees of Providence St. Mel School (Chicago), the Board of Directors of the Airline Tariff Publishing Co. and Board of Trustees of the Alexian Brothers Medical Center (Elk Grove, Illinois, USA). Gangwal was conferred with the Distinguished Alumnus Award of the Indian Institute of Technology Kanpur.

In April 2022, Gangwal donated a sum of ₹100 crore (approximately $13.16 million) to set up a school of medical sciences and technology at IIT-Kanpur, which also received another ₹200 crore (approximately $26.32 million) in donations from other alumni for the medical institution. The facility was planned to have a 450-bed super speciality hospital and several centers of excellence.

In 2020, Gangwal was ranked 359th on the Forbes 400 list of the richest people in America.

In July 2024, Gangwal joined the board of Southwest Airlines, later buying approximately US$108 million worth of shares of the airline.

As of 30 September 2024, Gangwal and his family Trust (The Chinkerpoo Family Trust), with trustees Shobha Gangwal and JP Morgan Trust Company of Delaware held around 5.31 percent and 8.23 percent stake in Indigo Airlines respectively.

In November 2024, as part of its settlement with Elliott Investment Management, an activist investment fund, Southwest Airlines appointed Gangwal as chair of its corporate board. Gangwal announced his decision to step down from his role as Chair, effective Aug. 1, 2025, due to additional time commitments unrelated to the airline, but remain on the board.

== Personal life ==
Gangwal is married with one daughter and lives in Miami, Florida. His daughter, Parul, worked for the enterprise software company Salesforce in California. She later launched her own start-up, Minnesota-based Wheelhouse Capital, in June 2021.
