= Geneviève Salbaing =

Canadian dancer, choreographer and director

- Born: Geneviève Nehlil; February 2, 1922; Paris, France
- Died: May 8, 2016 (aged 94); Montreal, Canada
- Occupations: Dancer, administrator, artistic director
- Career
- Former groups: Les Ballets Jazz de Montreal

Geneviève Salbaing (née Nehlil; 2 February 1922 – 8 May 2016) was a Canadian dancer, choreographer and director. She was born in Paris but moved to Casablanca shortly afterwards. She began taking classes at three years old and returned to Paris to continue her training. After dancing with the Washington Concert Ballet for three years, she moved to Montreal and danced for various choreographers. After getting injured, she turned her attention to choreography and co-founded Les Ballets Jazz de Montreal. She became its artistic director and opened dance studios in various Canadian cities to train dancers in the ballet-jazz style. She retired as its artistic director in 1992. In 1987, Salbaing was appointed a member of the Order of Canada and, in 2012, she became an officer of the National Order of Quebec.

== Early life and education ==
Geneviève Salbaing was born Geneviève Nehlil in Paris, France, on 2 February 1922. She grew up in Casablanca, Morocco and received her first ballet training there at the age of three. She won first prize as a ballerina at the Casablanca conservatory and continued her training in Paris. When she was a teenager, Salbaing would spend her money to buy jazz records.

She returned to Paris and studied with Russian expatriates Lyubov Egorova and Mathilde Kschessinska. She also studied at the Sorbonne for a baccalaureate in philosophy. She left after one year when her husband was stationed to Washington DC during World War II.

== Dance career ==
Salbaing danced with the Washington Concert Ballet for three years. In 1946, she moved to Montreal when her husband relocated there for work. She performed with Fernand Nault on stage and danced for and choreographed classical ballet pieces at Radio-Canada. During this time, she met Ludmilla Chiriaeff and danced for her company, Les Ballets Chiriaeff. She retired from dancing after an injury but continued to choreograph as a freelancer. Although she loved classical ballet, she felt it restricted her choreography. She began to learn jazz technique to expand her dance vocabulary.

== Les Ballets Jazz de Montreal ==
In 1972, Salbaing co-founded Les Ballets Jazz de Montreal with Eva Von Gencsy and Eddie Toussaint and Salbaing became the company's administrator. There was tension between the founders and Toussaint left in 1974. Gencsy left a couple of years later in 1978 and never spoke of the split. Toussaint stated that Gencsy wanted to maintain the polished balletic lines while Salbaing wanted to make the company more commercial. However, Salbaing stated that her goal was not to create a jazz dance company but to create a contemporary dance company that performed to jazz music.

After Toussaint and Gencsy left Les Ballets Jazz, Salbaing became its artistic director. Under her leadership, the company toured domestically and internationally to 54 countries, performing almost 1500 times. She also founded dance schools of Les Ballets Jazz in Quebec City, Laval, Saint-Jean and Toronto.

In the 1980s, interest in the dance style of Les Ballets Jazz was waning. Salbaing sought to evolve her company by bringing new choreographers to create works for the company like Brian Macdonald. In 1992, she retired as its artistic director.

A clip of Les Ballets Jazz de Montreal performing Locked Up Laura in 2010 can be seen on Jacob's Pillow Dance Interactive.

== Personal life ==
Salbaing met her husband in Casablanca. He was stationed there during World War II as a naval architect while she danced at the municipal ballet. Her youngest son, Patrick Salbaing, was involved with the Les Ballets Jazz dance school in Toronto.

== Awards ==
In 1987, Salbaing was appointed a member of the Order of Canada. In 2012, she became an officer of the National Order of Quebec where she was cited for her work with the company.
