= Seema Mehta =

Indian classical dance expert and jewellery designer

Seema Kaushik Mehta
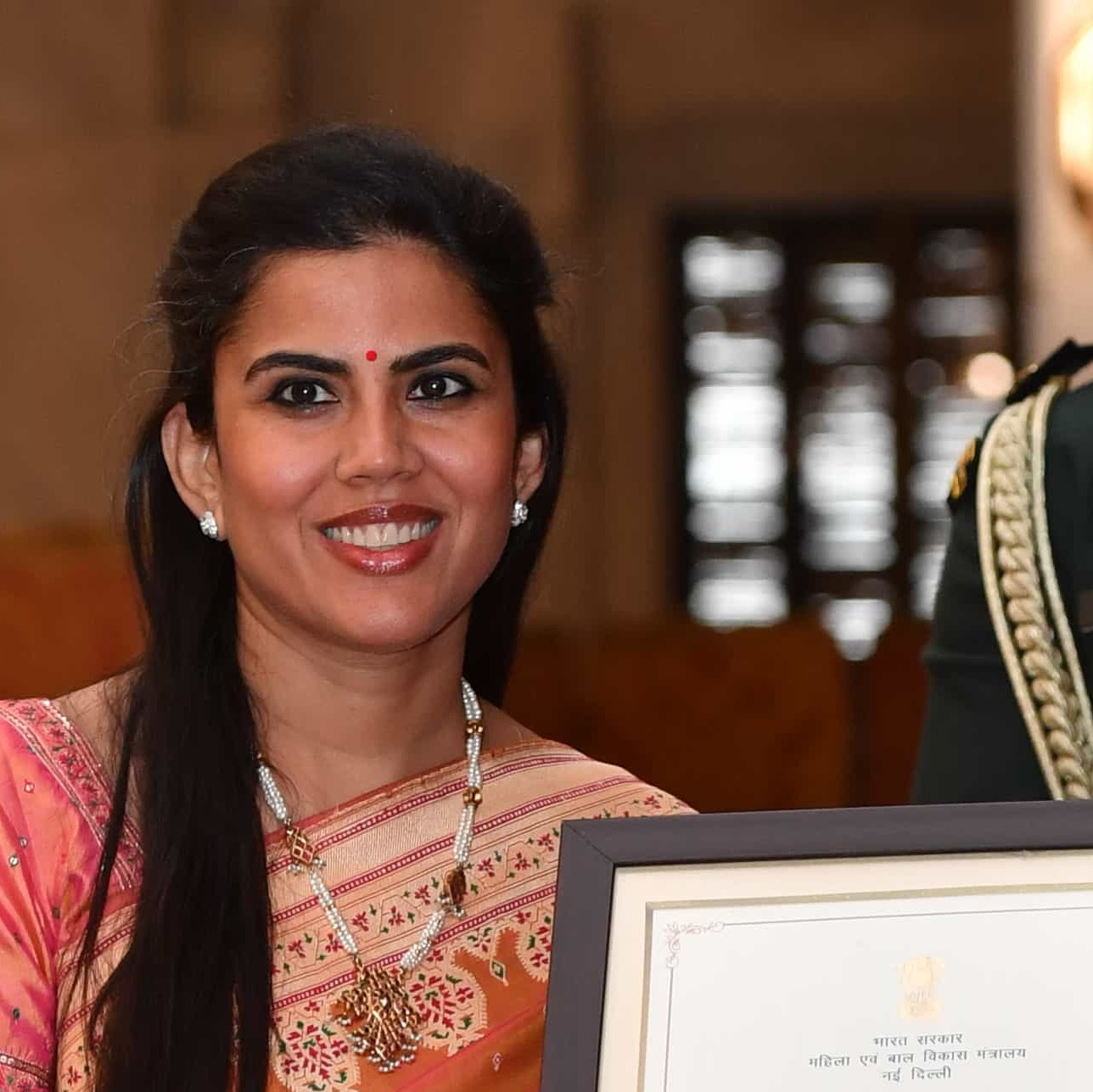
- in March 2019
- Born: c.1976
- Education: Academy of Art College in San Francisco
- Occupations: dancer and jewellery designer
- Known for: Nari Shakti Puraskar award

Seema Kaushik Mehta (born c.1976) is an Indian Kathak expert and designer of jewellery. She received the Nari Shakti Puraskar award for her dancing advocacy in 2019 after working with under-privileged children in Mumbai.

== Life ==
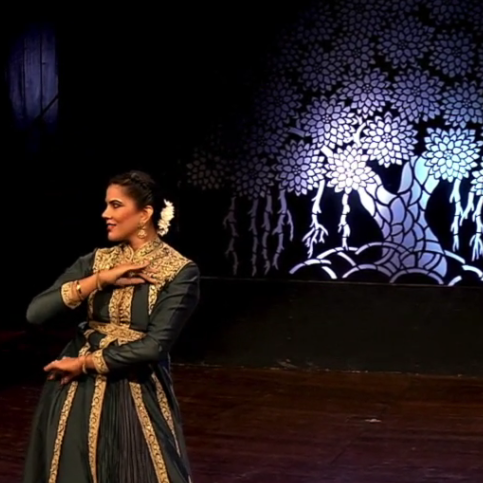
Mehta dances for Leela Dance Collective in 2019

She was born in about 1976 and she studied at the Academy of Art College in San Francisco.

She became a Chitresh Das disciple in 2010 and followed his ideas until his death in 2015. She trained with him and would perform his style of dancing in India. She and Pandit Das founded the second branch of his school in India, Chhandam Nritya Bharati, in Mumbai in 2010. Mehta's mentor had taught Kathak dance to the children of sex workers in Calcutta to help them break free of the cycle of exploitation.

Mehta was given the Nari Shakti Puraskar award on International Women's Day in 2019. 1000 women were nominated for the award and 44 were chosen to receive it. She was chosen because of her work with under-privileged children in Mumbai. They were learning to dance, but also to assert themselves. Maneka Gandhi was at the ceremony and spoke about the ambition of women in India.

Mehta appeared with American tap dancer Jason Samuels Smith. Samuels Smith had previously toured with her mentor. Kathak and tap dancing complement each other as both use the feet with the major difference being footwear as Kathak is done bare foot.

== Jewelry ==
Mehta runs a school Chhandam Nritya Bharati and is still involved in jewelry design. She says that jewellery design and dance are both part of her life. She is the creative director in her family's jewellery business.
