= Don Bosco School, Park Circus =

Private Catholic school in Kolkata, India

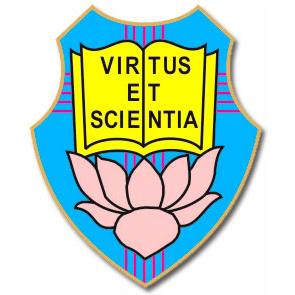

Location
- 23 Darga Road, Park Circus; Kolkata, West Bengal, 700017; India; 22.544217°N 88.371500°E

Information
- Type: Private school
- Motto: Latin: Virtus et Scientia (Virtue and Knowledge)
- Religious affiliation: Roman Catholic
- Established: 1958; 68 years ago
- School board: ICSE (year 10); ISC (year 12)
- Oversight: Salesians of Don Bosco
- Principal: V.C George
- Grades: LKG–12
- Gender: Boys
- Language: English
- Houses: Bosco; Rua; Savio; Francis
- Colours: White and Blue
- Affiliation: Council for the Indian School Certificate Examinations
- Website: www.donboscoparkcircus.org

Don Bosco School, Park Circus is a private, Roman Catholic, English-medium school for boys in Kolkata, West Bengal, India. It was established in 1958 and is part of the Salesians of Don Bosco. It is affiliated to the Council for the Indian School Certificate Examinations.

== History ==
The Catholic order of Salesians of Don Bosco first came to Calcutta in 1925. In early 1955, the order acquired two large plots of land in the Circus Park area of the city on which to build a school. In September of that year work began on constructing the new school. In November 1957, with the building's completion in sight, Charles Dyer was appointed the first rector and principal of Don Bosco Park Circus. The school officially opened on 15 January 1958 with an intake of 460 boys. The school now has an enrollment of 3000 students. It celebrated its golden jubilee in 2008, the culmination of a year of festivities which began in March 2007.

== Traditions and houses ==
The school's patron saint is Dominic Savio, a pupil of John Bosco, who died at the age of fourteen and was made a saint on the basis of his having displayed "heroic virtue" in his everyday life.

== Campus ==
The campus is dominated by the H-shaped four-storey main school building which has an outer courtyard with the statue of Mary, mother of Jesus Christ, along with statues of other animals, such as lions and giraffes, and an inner courtyard with a bust of John Bosco. In 2013, the school's new library block with further laboratories and classrooms was inaugurated. The campus also has special air-conditioned halls for conducting board examinations seamlessly.

== Events ==
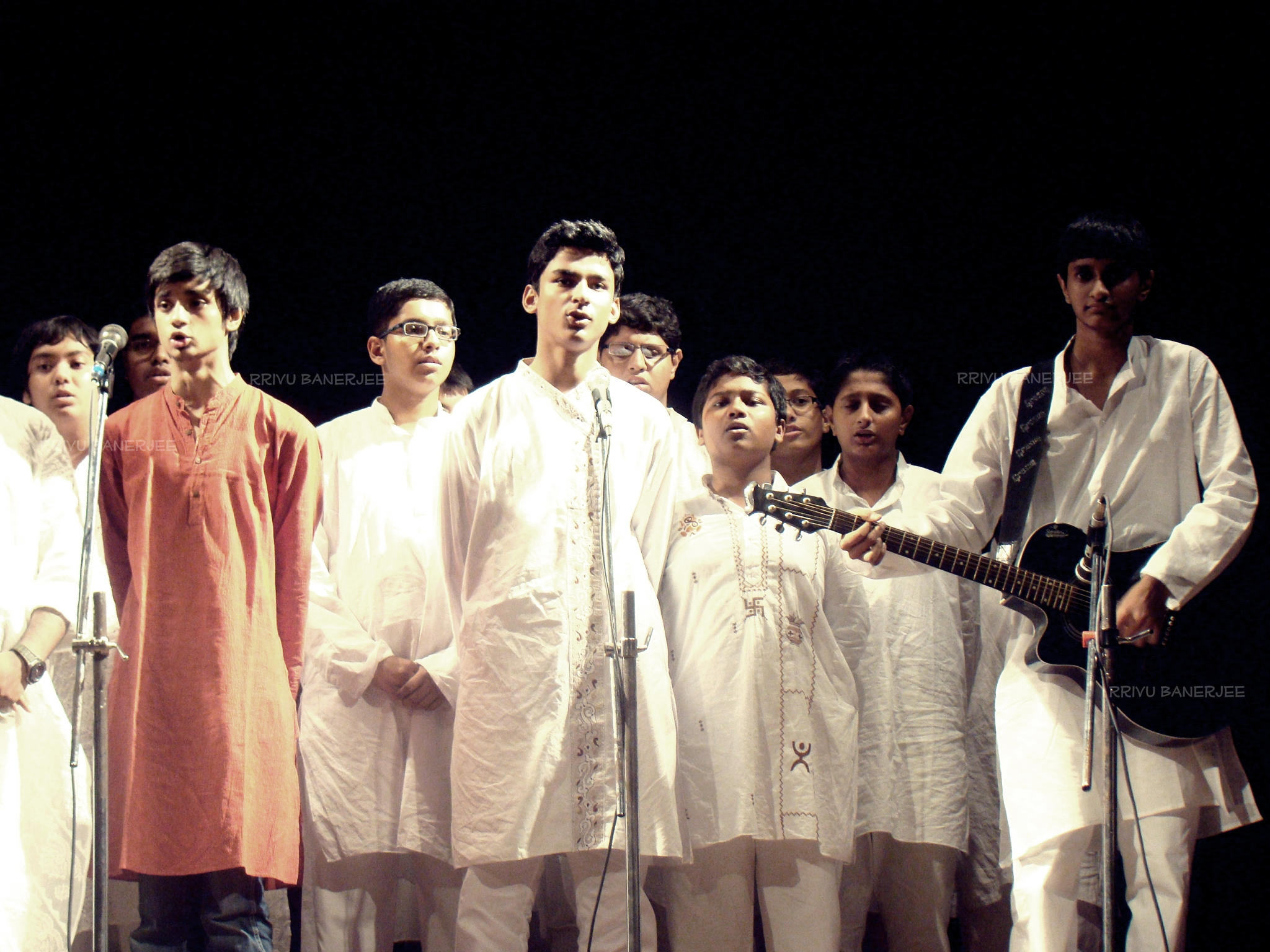
Rabindra Jayanti celebration, 2012

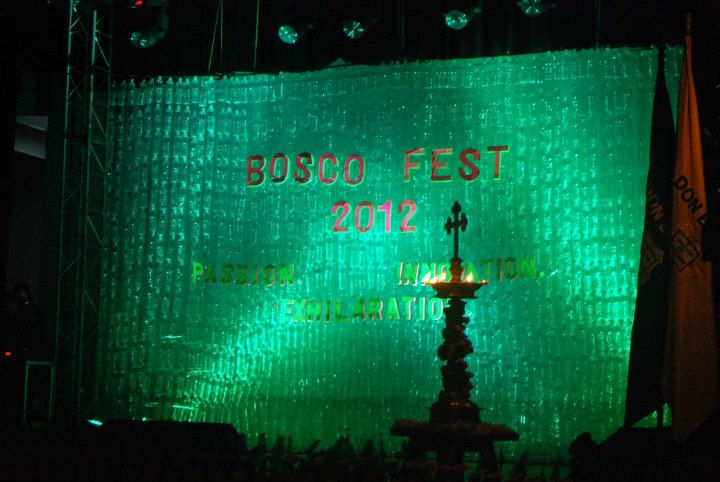
Bosco Fest 2012 with the theme "Passion. Innovation. Exhilaration"

In addition to its annual celebration of Rabindra Jayanti (the birthday of Rabindranath Tagore), the school hosts several interschool events in Kolkata, the most prominent of which is Bosco Fest. One of Kolkata's oldest inter-school festivals, it is held annually in late July or early August. The fest initially began with just two events—Bosco Beat (an inter-school band event) and Jubilee Quiz (an Inter-school quizzing event). Since then the fest has changed completely and there are now more than 20 events, which are organized by several action groups. Some of the events include Bosco Tango, Bosco Raag, Bosco Beat and Bosco Jukebox. The fest has its own website and mobile app. Other events also take place throughout the year such as Bosco MUN (Model United Nations)

== Twinning and exchange programmes ==
Since 2009, the school has established links with the Salesian School, Chertsey, close to London. Thereafter, students from the UK have been visiting Don Bosco School, Park Circus every year. The school has also signed a Memorandum of Understanding with the Goethe Institut for greater collaboration and the teaching of German in school. This has allowed students to visit Germany for Inter-cultural language programmes since 2010, under the Schulen: Partner der Zukunft (Schools: Partners for the Future) initiative of the Goethe Institut and the Federal Republic of Germany.

== Notable alumni ==
- Samit Basu, novelist and filmmaker.
- Rakesh Gangwal, American billionaire businessman He is one of the founders of IndiGo.
- Subrata Mitra, prominent venture capitalist
- Sujoy Bose, financial services leader
- Amit Bagga, winner of 2 Emmy awards
- Neel Mukherjee, an Indian English-language writer based in London.
- Jayant Kripalani, Indian actor.
- Shayan Munshi, an Indian actor.
- Anish John, Musician.
- Arko Pravo Mukherjee, Music Composer, Singer, Lyricist, Producer, famed in the Cinema of India.
- Revant Himatsingka also known as Food Pharmer.
- Ritesh Das, Tabla Player.
- Srinjoy Bose, an Indian politician and ex member of Rajya Sabha
- Amitabha Ghosh , a planetary geologist
- Subhashis Nag, a mathematician and Shanti Swarup Bhatnagar Prize winner.

== Gallery ==
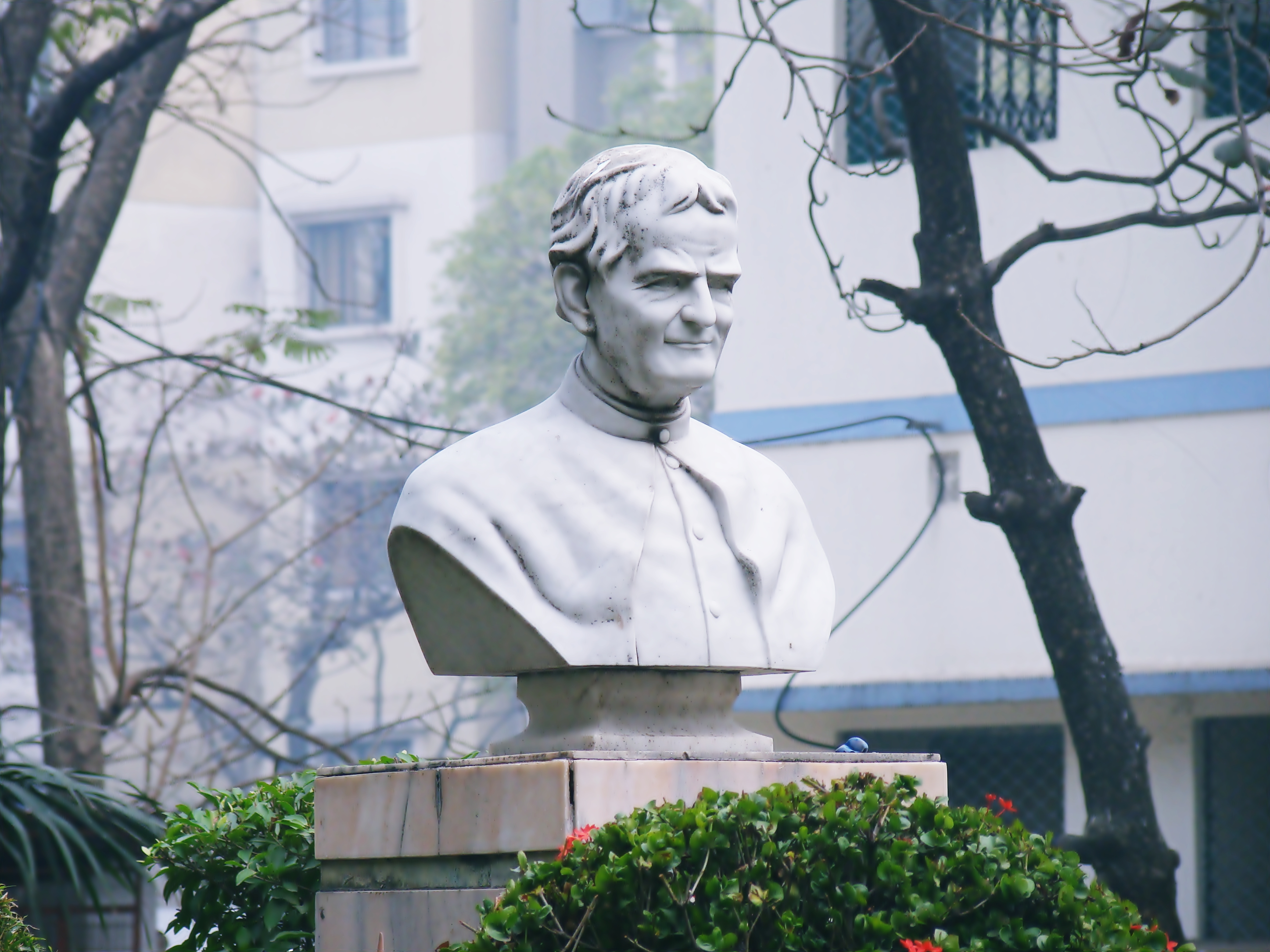
Bust of John Bosco in the inner courtyard

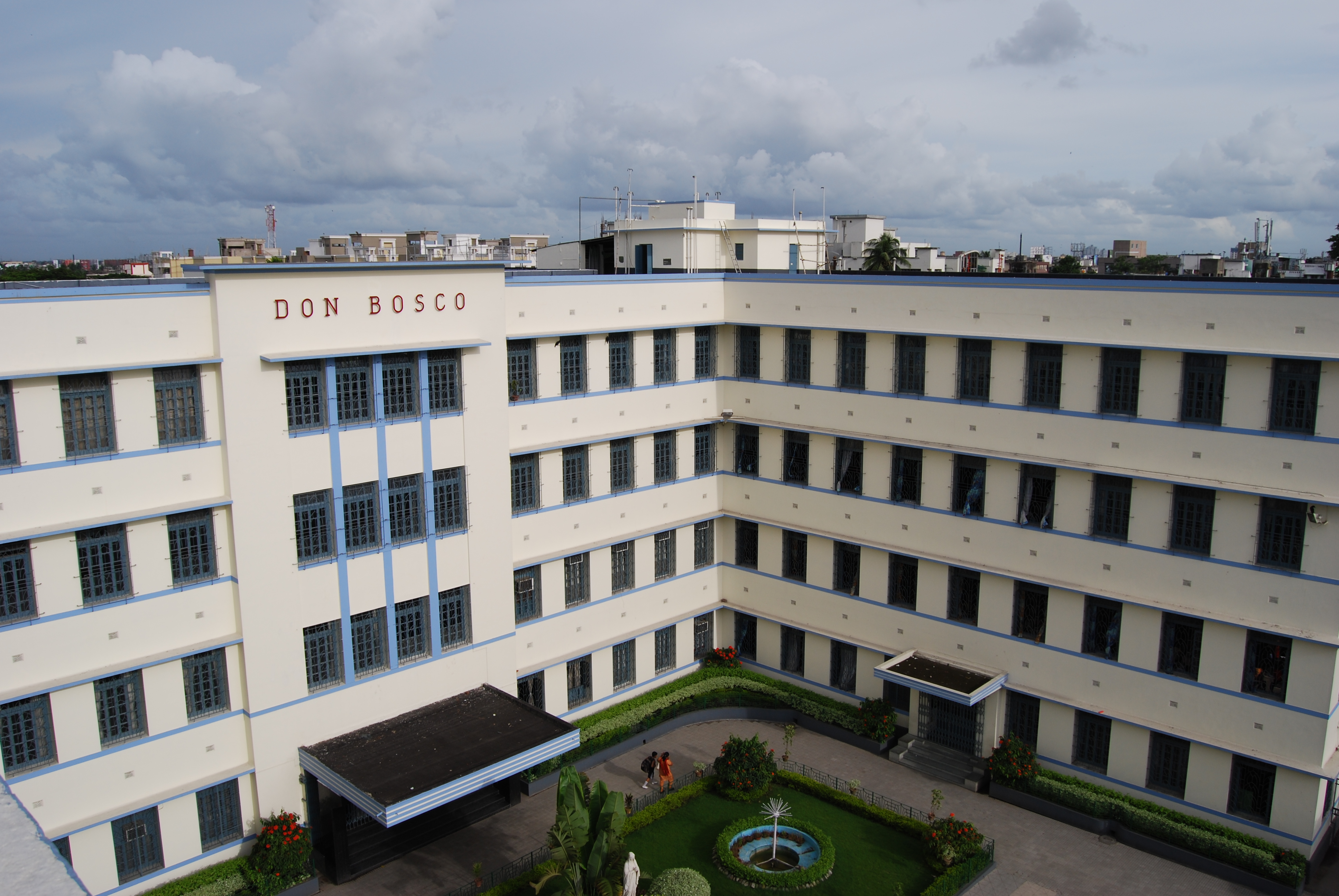
View of the main building and outer courtyard

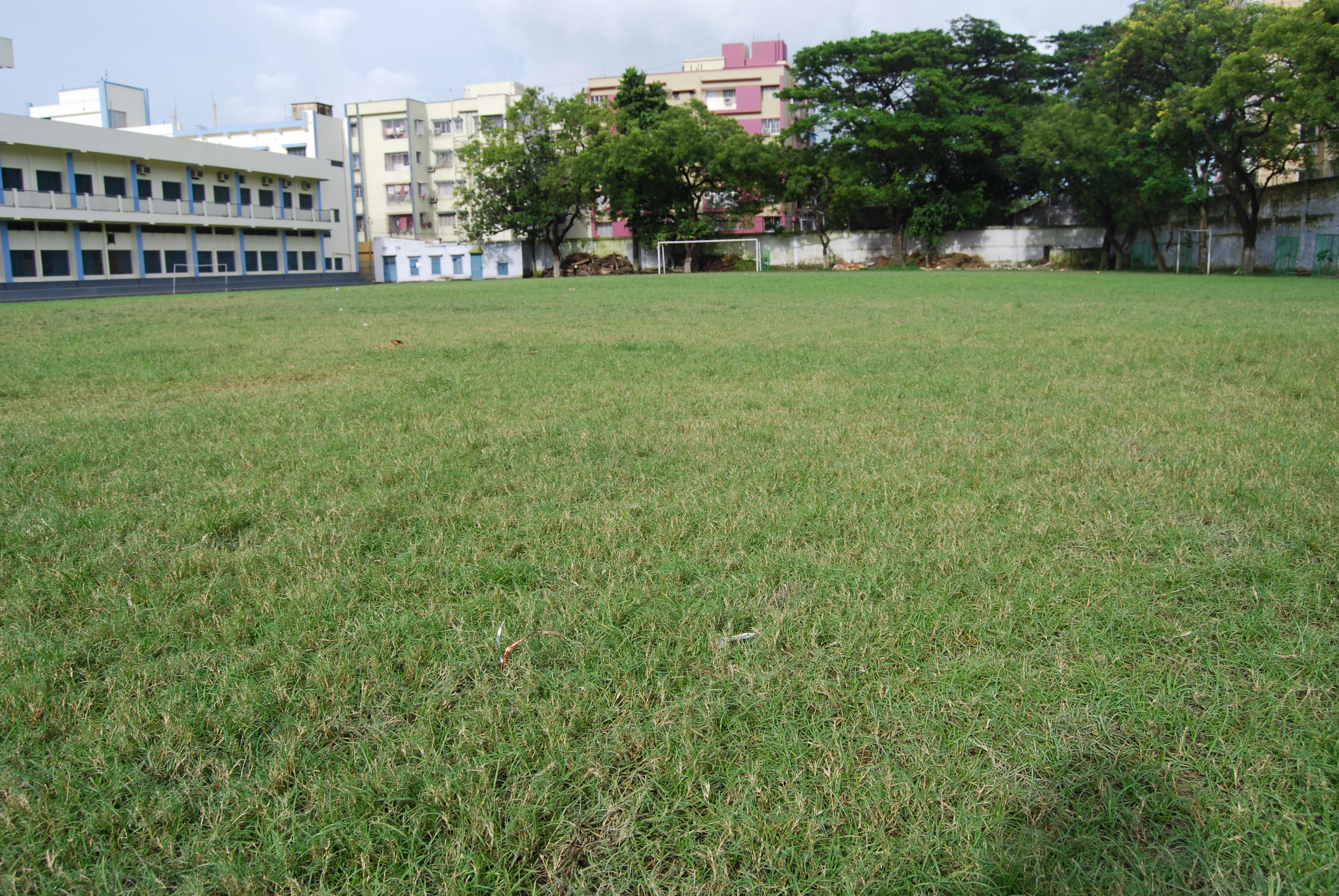
School playing field

== See also ==
- List of schools in Kolkata
