= Toronto Tabla Ensemble =

Canadian non-profit charitable organization

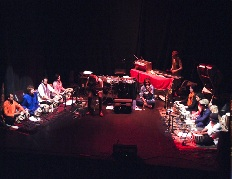
- The Toronto Tabla Ensemble in concert

Background information
- Origin: Toronto, Ontario, Canada
- Genres: North Indian Classical, World
- Years active: 1991–present
- Label: Independent
- Members: Ritesh Das; Razak Pirani; Shamir Panchal; Nivethan Velauthapillai; Alysha Addetia
- Website: www.torontotabla.com

The Toronto Tabla Ensemble (TTE) is a non-profit charitable organization founded by Artistic Director and tabla master Ritesh Das. The performing ensemble has toured Canada coast-to-coast six times, toured Australia in 2006, and India in 2011.

Since 1996 the TTE has produced numerous music videos and seven albums, including Firedance, which received a nomination for the Juno Award for Best Global Album. Their original music has been used in numerous films and commercials, and in 2003 the Ensemble was commissioned to create the theme music for CBC Radio’s daily morning show, Metro Morning.

== History ==
Ritesh Das founded the Toronto Tabla Ensemble in 1991 when he first presented a group of his students at the Harbourfront Centre in Toronto. From then on his mission was to collaborate with other artists and cultures. One of his first collaborations was with Japanese Taiko drummer Kiyoshi Nagata who later went on to form Nagata Shachu. Other collaborator include: kathak dancers Pandit Chitesh Das, multi-instrumentalist George Koller, composer Donald Quan, flamenco artist Esmeralda Enrique and in 2006 the TTE paired up with Canadian musician Jeff Martin from The Tea Party and toured Canada and Australia. They have also created and performed songs with famous Canadian singer, Bif Naked.

Their latest collaboration featured bagpiper Craig Downie from Enter the Haggis and created a music video "Unexpected Guests" featuring over 50 artists which was completed a few weeks before the pandemic outbreak in March 2020.

== 25 years ==
In 2016, the Toronto Tabla Ensemble celebrated its 25th anniversary with a pair of concerts at the Harbourfront Centre in Toronto. This was the official debut of the Toronto Tabla Youth Ensemble and featured brand new music composed by Artistic Director Ritesh Das. In addition to the tabla, students played South Indian mridangam, ghatam, and keyboard, and also launched the JAMKat. For this event, the Prime Minister of Canada, Justin Trudeau, wrote a congratulatory letter which was presented by the Parliamentary Secretary to the Minister of Immigration, Refugees and Citizenship, Arif Virani, during the concert. The concert was supported in part by Ontario Arts Council.

== Indian Diaspora Festival ==
In 2014, the Toronto Tabla Ensemble launched an innovative festival called the Indian Diaspora Festival. The sold out festival launch featured performances of Indian dance and music performed by local and international artists. The tabla player was a student of Ritesh Das trained in Toronto while the kathak dancer was a student of Das' late brother Pandit Chitresh Das from California.

== Discography ==
- Toronto Tabla Ensemble (1996)
- Second Palla (1998)
- Firedance (2000)
- Weaving (2002)
- Compilations (2007)
- Alankar (2008)
- Bhumika (2018)
- Unexpected Guests (2020)

== Awards and nominations ==
- 2021 Global Music Award: Composing and Sound Editing/Mixing for 'Unexpected Guests'
- 2020 Canadian Ethnic Media Awards: for 'Unexpected Guests'
- 2020 Canadian Folk Music Awards: Nominated Best World and Best Instrumental Group for 'Bhumika'
- 2019 Independent Music Award: Best World Traditional for 'Faceoff'
- 2019 Independent Music Award: Nomination Best Music Video for 'Faceoff'
- 2019 Toronto Short Film Festival: Best Music Video for 'Faceoff'
- 2019 Delhi Shorts International Film Festival: Best Music Video for 'Faceoff'
- 2018 Global Music Award: Composing/Composition for 'Bhumika'
- 2018 Grant's Desi Achievers Award: Composer Ritesh Das
- 2018 Toronto Arts Foundation 'Celebration of Cultural Life' Nominee: Ritesh Das
- 2016 Toronto Arts Foundation 'Roy Thomson Hall Award' Recipient: Ritesh Das
- 2000 JUNO Awards: Nominees for 'Firedance'
