= Frank Hatchett =

American jazz dancer and dance teacher

Frank Hatchett III
- Born: December 7, 1935; Danville, Virginia, U.S.
- Died: December 23, 2013 (aged 78)
- Occupations: jazz dancer; dance teacher
- Known for: Developing VOP jazz

Frank Hatchett III (December 7, 1935 – December 23, 2013) was an American jazz dancer and dance teacher known for developing VOP, a commercial jazz style that combined traditional jazz technique with contemporary social dance, hip-hop, modern dance and African dance. He performed in theatre, film, television and nightclubs before establishing dance schools in Springfield, Massachusetts, and Hartford, Connecticut.

Hatchett later became a prominent teacher in New York City, where he co-founded the Hines-Hatchett studio with Maurice Hines and remained associated with the school after it became Broadway Dance Center. He taught into his late seventies and received a Dance Teacher Lifetime Achievement Award in 2013.

== Early life ==
Hatchett was born in Danville, Virginia, on December 7, 1935, and was raised in East Hartford, Connecticut, and Springfield, Massachusetts. He began dancing as a child at a local Connecticut studio and later trained with Philadelphia dance teacher Eleanor Harris, who helped him secure work in revues in Atlantic City and Las Vegas.

== Career ==
=== Performing and teaching ===
Hatchett began his professional career as a jazz dancer, working in theatre, film, television, concert productions and nightclubs. His appearances included work alongside entertainers such as Sammy Davis Jr. and Eartha Kitt, and he later appeared on MTV's The Real World and VH1's Driven.

Hatchett opened his first studio, the Hatchett School of Dance, in a converted storefront in Springfield, Massachusetts, where it served neighborhood youth. He later opened a second school in Hartford, Connecticut.

After moving to New York City, Hatchett studied Katherine Dunham technique, along with African, East Indian and Caribbean dance forms. He began teaching at Jo Jo's Dance Factory in 1980.

In 1982, he and Maurice Hines established the Hines-Hatchett dance studio in New York City. Richard Ellner assumed ownership of the studio in 1984 and renamed it Broadway Dance Center. Hatchett and Hines remained associated with the new school.

=== VOP jazz ===
Hatchett developed a style of jazz dance known as VOP, combining elements of Katherine Dunham technique with contemporary social dance. Dance Magazine described VOP as blending traditional jazz, hip-hop, modern dance and African dance into a commercial style.

In its obituary, Dance Magazine described Hatchett as a jazz pioneer whose teaching developed during a period of transition in jazz dance, as hip-hop was becoming increasingly influential.

His teaching emphasized both dance technique and performance projection, with students performing combinations for one another at the end of class.

=== Later teaching career ===
Hatchett later taught regularly at Broadway Dance Center in New York City and traveled as a guest teacher. He also taught for organizations including the Jazz Dance World Congress, Dance Masters of America and Dance Educators of America.

Hatchett retired from regular teaching around 2011 but continued to participate in dance education events, including a demonstration at the 2012 Dance Teacher Summit.

Broadway Dance Center faculty member Sheila Barker was one of Hatchett's former students and later became his teaching assistant. In a 2023 profile, Barker described his influence on her approach to teaching jazz dance.

== Publications ==
Hatchett's book, Frank Hatchett's Jazz Dance, co-written with Nancy Myers Gitlin, was published in 2000.

An instructional video featuring Hatchett was released in 2003 as part of the Live at Broadway Dance Center series.

== Recognition and later life ==
ABC's Good Morning America referred to Hatchett as the "Doctor of Jazz".

In 2002, Hatchett was one of four dance teachers honored at the TDF/Astaire Awards.

In 2013, Dance Teacher presented Hatchett with its Lifetime Achievement Award. Hatchett died on December 23, 2013, at age 78.
