= Jazz shoe =

Type of shoe for dancing

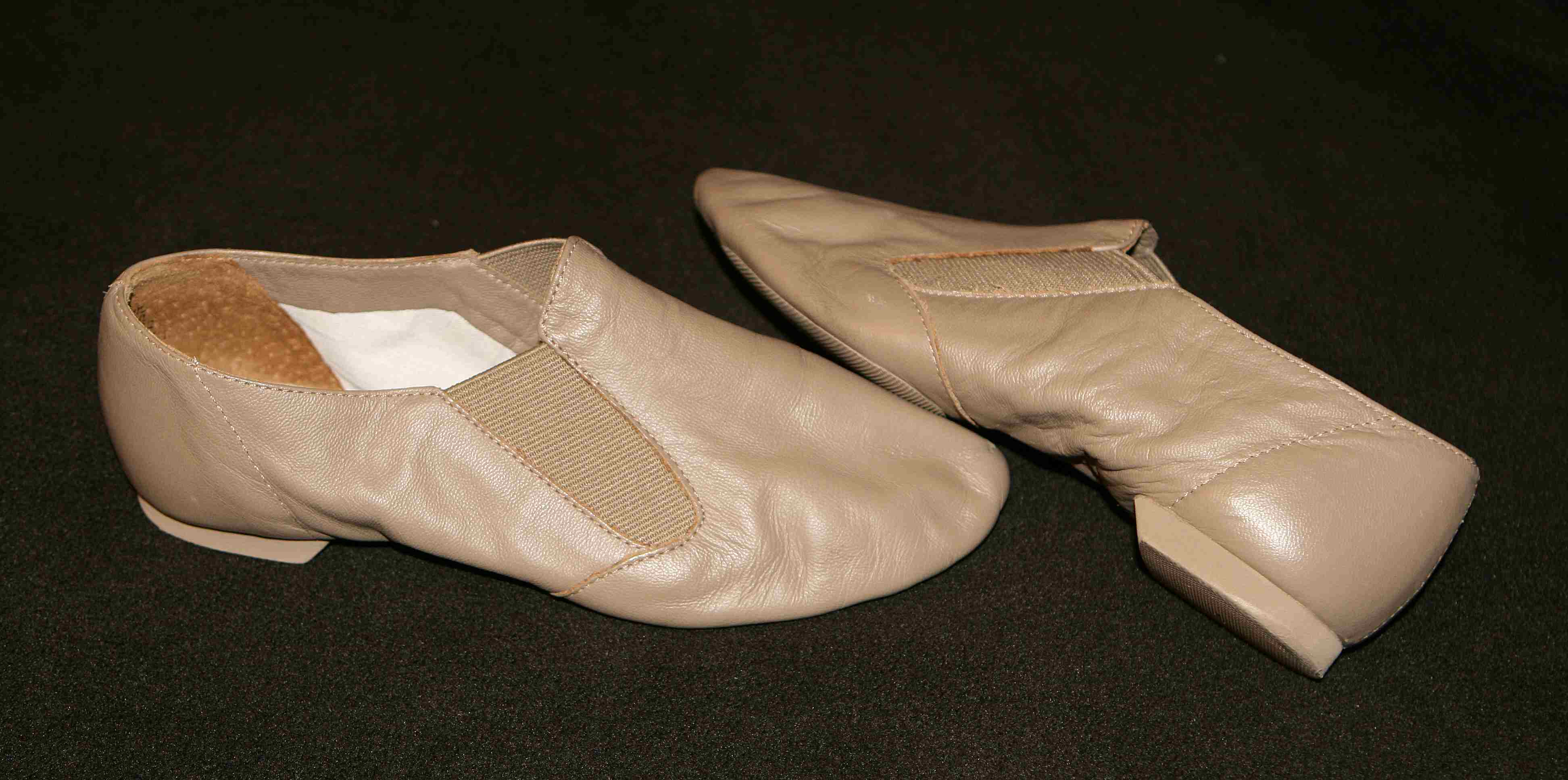
Jazz slip-ons

A jazz shoe is a type of shoe worn by dancers. They were popularized in jazz dance and other styles of dance including acro dance, acrobatic rock'n'roll, and in other activities, such as aerobics. Jazz dance can be done in any type of shoe—jazz originated as a social dance and was done in everyday clothes and shoes. Oxford shoes were only popularized as jazz dance shoes in the mid 20th century when the dance form made its way out of the clubs and onto the stage.

Jazz shoes are available in a variety of styles, with varying features. They may be high-rise or low-rise, and may be slip-ons or lace-up Oxfords. Split-sole jazz shoes allow enhanced shoe flexibility, making it possible to point the foot more easily. Most have rubber soles, which provide traction and also help to cushion the foot, and some have thicker heels for better shock-absorption. Jazz shoes typically come in a tan or black color. Some have a suede patch under the ball of the foot to facilitate turning.

== See also ==
- List of shoe styles
