= Dance costume =

Costume worn for dancing

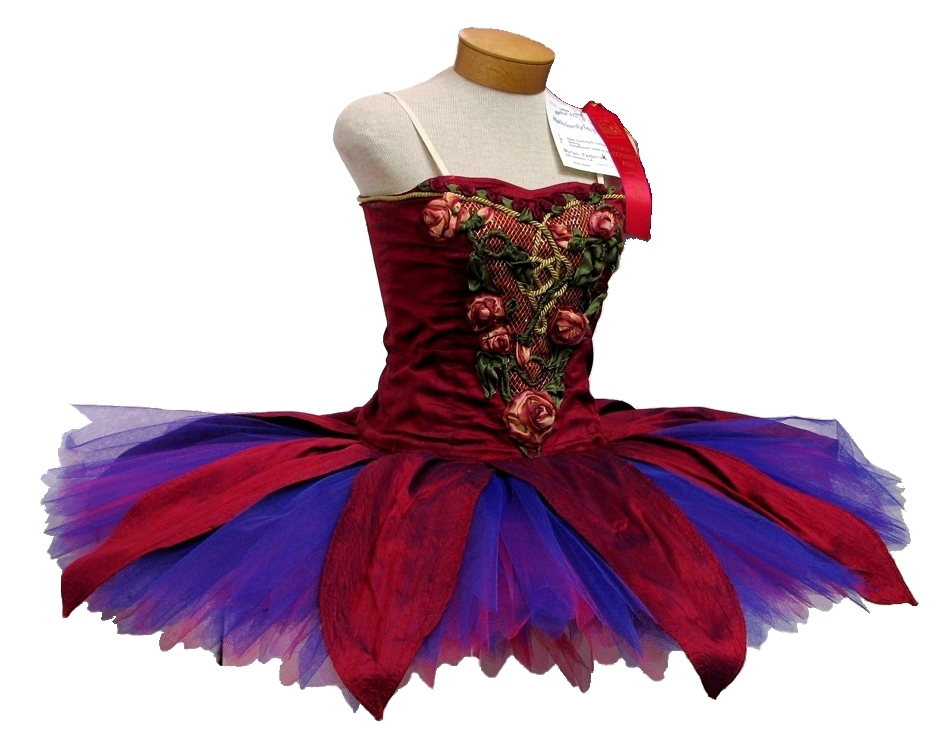
A dance costume used in ballet

A dance costume is the clothing worn by a dancer when performing before an audience. A dance costume may be custom designed for use in a specific dance work, or it may have a traditional design, such as those used in some ceremonial and folk dances. Typically, dance costumes are designed to harmonize with the dance and not hinder the movements of the dancer.

When created for a specific work, a costume may be designed to expose or enhance the lines formed by the dancer's body, or to express the choreographer's artistic vision, or to engage the audience, or combinations of these. A costume may portray or relate to some characteristic, mood, or theme of the dance. It may fit loosely or it may be form-fitting to emphasize the form of the dancer's body. Costumes are designed in accordance with aesthetic requirements, the anticipated movements of the dancer, and budget. Various people may collaborate in designing a costume, including the choreographer, costume designer, costume maker (seamstress), and dancer.

== History ==
In the nineteenth and twentieth centuries, Marie Camargo influenced changes in dance costumes by abandoning the traditional corset and dancing barefoot with exposed arms and legs. Later, Isadora Duncan introduced a new look to dance costumes, inspired by the Greeks, of tunics and scarves that conformed to body shape and exposed body lines.

== Design ==
=== Material ===
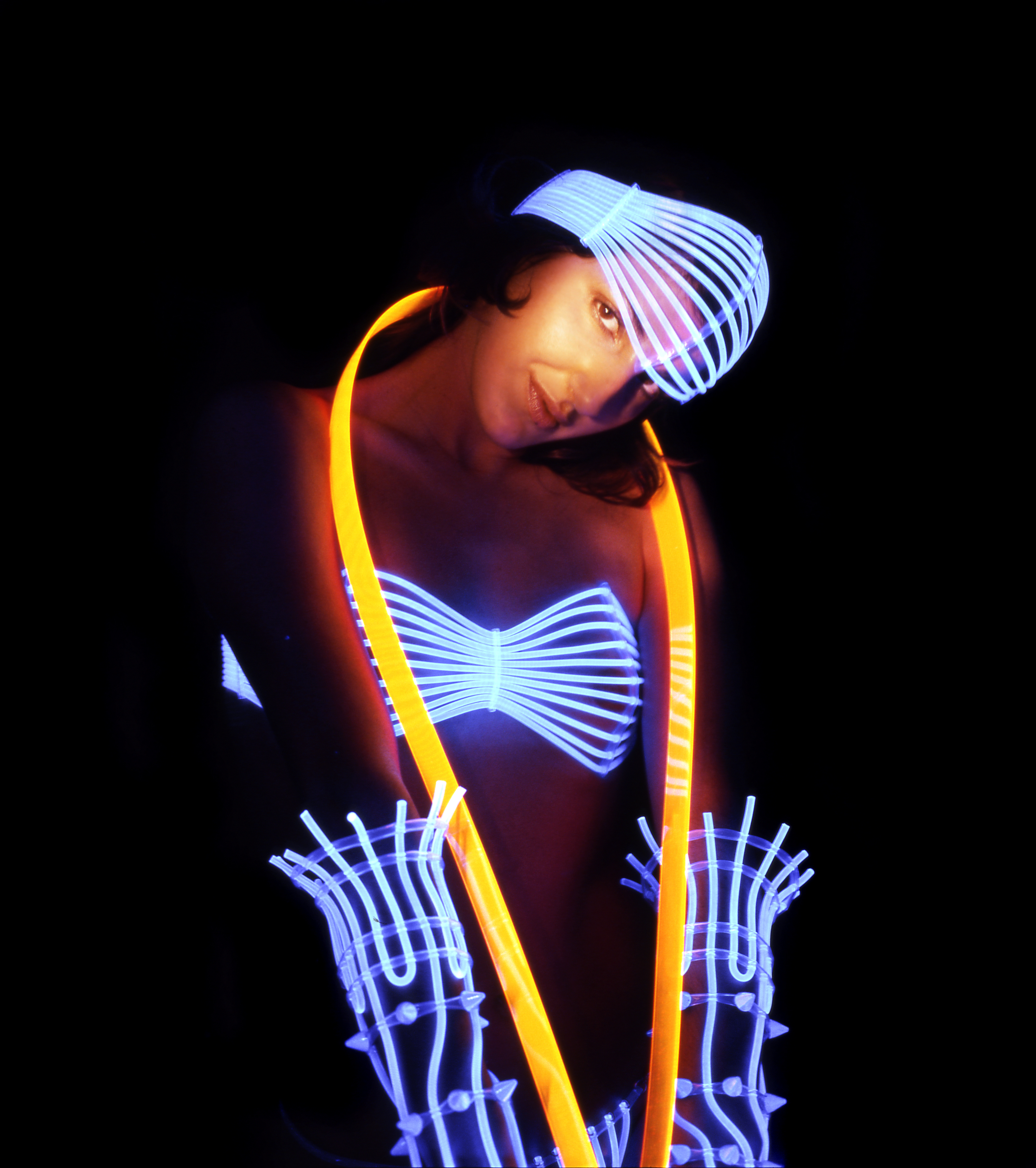
A lighted dance costume

The amount of light a material absorbs and reflects may be a factor in material selection. Also, dance is about movement, so the way a fabric hangs or moves on the dancer is important. Lightweight materials such as silk move faster and easier and tend to flow around the body. Stretchable fabrics such as jersey, silk, chiffon, Georgette, and Lycra are commonly used because they don't restrict movement. Natural materials such as Cotton or silk are typically used when the costume is to be dyed because they absorb dye well. Stiff fabric is typically used to create a boxy, square, or immobile look.

=== Color ===
Costume color can be used isolate a dancer, and a costume's colors usually contrast with the lighting, accessories and props used in the dance. Also, color can influence audience emotions and, as a result, costume colors may be chosen according to their relevance to the emotions expressed in the dance. For example, violet may impart a cold feeling and red may evoke a warm feeling. Colors can also be symbolic; for example, green creates a feeling of envy and white evokes purity. Costumes will sometimes incorporate layers of colors that are revealed when the dancer moves.

Costume colors may be used to enhance body line and form, and they may be chosen to complement the dancer's body shape or skin color. Darker colors can make the dancer appear slimmer, whereas lighter colors tend to make the dancer appear larger. Loud prints or bold color combinations are often avoided as they can distort the body lines and, in the case of tights, tend to make the dancer look larger. Also, strong, intense colors may tire the eyes. Color transitions are often implemented using gradients, as sharp color contrasts tend to visually chop the body into sections.

=== Texture and pattern ===
Costume texture and patterns can emphasize or minimize parts of a dancer's body. For example, vertical lines visually lengthen and thin the body, and horizontal lines shorten and widen it. Costume textures and patterns are created using shading, patching, tie-dyeing, and appliqué techniques such as drawing with a fabric pen or painting on the fabric, spraying the fabric, or stitching onto the fabric. Stencils are commonly used when drawing or spraying onto costume fabric. When applying appliqué to stretchable material, the dancer will typically wear the costume so that the design will not be distorted.

=== Footwear ===
Some dance styles require a specific type of dance shoe. Shoes are usually chosen to harmonize with the costume, with consideration for safety and injury avoidance. In some cases, the footwear may blend with the outfit so it will not draw attention to the feet. If the dance involves a significant amount of turning, the footwear will typically cover the balls of the feet to enable the dancer to turn more easily.

=== Construction ===
Dance costumes are designed so that dancers can move in them as required without damaging them. For example, if a dancer will be lifted, the costume will typically be designed in such a way that the lifter's fingers are unlikely to catch on it. In some cases, the armhole is cut unusually high to ensure free movement at the armpit.

Costumes frequently have special construction features and may also have accessories such as false sleeves, collars, cuffs, wristbands, and shawls. Often, a costume must accommodate quick changes; this is usually facilitated with Velcro or hook fasteners. In some costumes the bottom of the fabric is weighted so that it will move in a stately fashion. Lining may be used to place a costume in a specific era or ethnic group and give form, qualities of movement and direction, and accentuate points of interest.

== See also ==
- Ballet and fashion
