= Chitresh Das =

Indian dancer, choreographer and educator

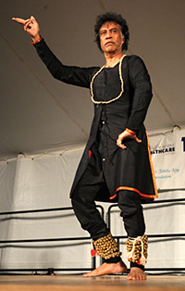
Chitresh Das performing at the 2008 American Folk Festival.

Chitresh Das (Devanagari: चित्रेश दास) (9 November 1944 – 4 January 2015) was a classical dancer of the North Indian style of Kathak. Born in Calcutta, Das was a performer, choreographer, composer and educator. He was instrumental in bringing Kathak to the US and is credited with having established Kathak amongst the Indian diaspora in America. In 1979, Das established the Chhandam School of Kathak and the Chitresh Das Dance Company in California. In 2002, he founded Chhandam Nritya Bharati in India. There were ten branches of Chhandam worldwide. Until his death in 2015, Das taught dance as a way of life, a path for attaining self-knowledge and as a service to society.

Das performed in India, North America and Europe. He was known for his virtuosic footwork, rhythmic adeptness, compelling storytelling, as well as his innovation of "Kathak Yoga".

== Early life and background ==
Chitresh Das was born in Calcutta, West Bengal to Nrityacharya Prohlad Das and Smt. Nilima Das. His parents founded "Nritya Bharati", one of India's first institutions for dance that housed teachers of several classical and folk styles. Prohlad Das, a dance scholar and choreographer, used traditional dance forms to express modern issues in his revolutionary work Abhyudaya (meaning "awakening") staged before Indian Independence in 1947. Das frequently cited his mother, Nilima Das, stating, "mother is the first guru".

Growing up in his parents' dance school in Calcutta, Nritya Bharati, Das was surrounded by literary artists, poets, dancers, and gurus. He recalled iconic dancers such as Rukmini Devi Arundale, Uday Shankar, Balasaraswati and the legendary Shambhu Maharaj coming to visit his home.

Das began his study of Kathak at age nine under Kathak guru Ram Narayan Misra, a disciple of Shambhu and Acchchan Maharaj. Das was schooled in both major Kathak traditions, embodying each in his artistry: the graceful and sensual elements of the Lucknow school combined with the dynamic and powerful rhythms and movements of the Jaipur School.

Das was a child prodigy who attained national fame, performing at age 11 with the legendary tabla maestro Samta Prasadji and in a special concert for Indian dance icon Uday Shankar. Das graduated from Rabindra Bharati University in Calcutta and earned his M.A. in dance from Prayag Sangit Samiti in Allahabad.

== Teaching career ==
Chitresh Das came to the United States in 1970 on a Whitney Fellowship to teach Kathak at the University of Maryland. In 1971, Das was invited by Ustad Ali Akbar Khan to the San Francisco Bay Area to teach Kathak and establish a dance program at the Ali Akbar College of Music (AACM) in San Rafael, California.

By 1979, he left the AACM faculty to form his own dance school called Chhandam; his "Chitresh Das Dance Company" (CDDC) was incorporated in 1980. In 1988, Das formed the first university accredited Kathak course in the US at San Francisco State University; several current dancers of CDDC began studying with Das in the SFSU program. Das was also a guest faculty member at Stanford University.

His own school of Chhandam has continued to grow with branches in San Francisco, Fremont/Union City, Berkeley, Mountain View, San Jose, Sacramento, and Los Angeles. His disciples, Joanna De Souza and Gretchen Hayden went on to establish branches of Chhandam in Toronto (1990) and Boston (1992), respectively. Chhandam had 550 students enrolled at branches across North America in 2010.

Through the years Das would return annually for several months to India to teach and perform. In 2002, Das reopened his parents' school of Chhandam Nritya Bharati in Calcutta, India.

In 2010, Seema Mehta, one of his disciples and Das founded the second branch of his school in India, Chhandam Nritya Bharati, in Mumbai. While in India, Das continued his work with the New Light Foundation, teaching Kathak dance to the children of sex workers of the Kalighat red light district in Calcutta as a part of a program to help them break free of the cycle of exploitation. Mehta would get an award from the President of India for similar work in 2019.

As he was trained by his Guru, Ram Narayan Misra, Das trained his own students, both in the US and India, within the guru-shisya parampara (the tradition of master and disciple). A Guru is "one who removes the darkness" through direct knowledge and training. Das was said to have remained committed to preserving the traditional one-to-one transmission of knowledge between guru and shisya in today's society; he trained many disciples who have gone on to become solo artists in their own right.

== Performing career ==
Chitresh Das performed in America, India and Europe as a solo artist and in collaborations including the Chitresh Das Dance Company. Select performances within India included the Surya festival (1982); Ravi Shankar's Rimpa Festival in Benares (1983), representing his home state of West Bengal in tours throughout India (1998, 1999), Dover Lane Conference, Kolkata (1979, 1982, 1984, 1994, 1996, 1999, 2003); National Kathak Festival in New Delhi (2003), Fort William, Kolkata (2005) where he performed before 4,000 Indian soldiers, UMAQ Festival, New Delhi (2004, 2006, 2007), US Consulate 50th Anniversary in Mumbai (2008), Karamatullah Khan Festival in Kolkata (2008), Mumbai Festival (2008), 50th Anniversary Festival and IIT Kharagpur, India (2009).

In the early 1970s, Das began performing in the United States. In 1984 Das was selected to perform in the Olympic Arts Festival during the Los Angeles Olympic Games. Other select American performances include the Lincoln Center (1988), International Kathak festival in Chicago (2004), American Dance Festival (2004, 2006), and the American Folk festival (2008). In the San Francisco Bay Area, Chitresh Das and his Dance Company have been a mainstay of the local dance season and his company's home season has included such masterpieces as Gold Rush (1990), Sadhana (1991), East as Center (2003), and his most recent award-winning collaboration with tap dancer, Jason Samuels Smith, IJS: India Jazz Suites (2005 to present). The original IJS collaboration was selected as the number one dance performance of 2005 by the San Francisco Chronicle as well as receiving the Isadora Duncan Ensemble of the year award (2005). Since IJS has toured extensively, including four tours to India, performances across America, including Hawaii, and Australia.

In 2006, the Chitresh Das and Chhandam organized a festival of Kathak dance in San Francisco, the largest Kathak festival ever to take place outside of India; it brought together Kathak dancers from all over the world. Mayor Gavin Newsom of San Francisco inaugurated the festival by proclaiming 28 Sep "Kathak Day".

Das had performed throughout Europe, including Bonn and Aachen International Dance Festivals (1983), Logan Hall in London (1984), and Nijmegen and Arnhem, Holland (1984). In the late eighties, he also performed throughout in Germany, Poland, and Hungary with Tanzprojekt.

== On screen ==
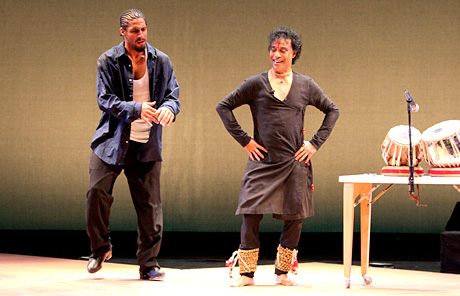
Chitresh Das and Jason Samuels Smith perform India Jazz Suites in 2009.

In 2004, Das was featured on a national PBS program, and in a BBC series Eighty Treasures Around the World; the program featured Das performing in a historic court in Calcutta. He was also featured in the PBS series Indians in America. In January 2005 and 2006, Das' solo performances were featured on national Indian television. In 2007, he was featured on PBS station KQED's performing arts profile show Spark.

Das's collaboration with Jason Samuel Smiths is the subject of a documentary, Upaj, nationally broadcast on PBS in 2011. Das also appeared on the popular Indian talk show Oye! Its Friday filmed in Mumbai in 2009.

== Style and contributions ==
"Freedom comes through refined discipline with responsibility."

In the early years, Das was known for his distinctively athletic style: fast and powerful emphasising footwork and swift turns. Das taught in this rigorous style with focus on tayari (readiness of technique, speed, and stamina) and laykari (virtuosity of Indian classical rhythmic system), but equally emphasises khubsurti (beauty) and nazakat (delicacy and refinement). Dancers must become adept at abhinaya (expression) and learn to masterfully portray the concept of 'Ardhanariswara' (the embodiment of the masculine and feminine) in their dance.

Das's teaching and performance also emphasise Upaj, or improvisation. Whilst Das has choreographed many group pieces, he and his students continue to present traditional full-length Kathak solos, requiring the dancer to improvise on stage with live musicians for up to two hours.

One of Das's most important contributions to his school and to the larger field of Kathak is his development of "Kathak yoga". Kathak yoga involves the practice of simultaneously dancing, singing, and often, playing an instrument. In Kathak yoga, the dancer recites a chosen taal (rhythmic cycle), sings the melody and the theka (language of the drum) of the taal, while practising precise complicated footwork. Kathak yoga is based on the fundamental yogic concept of integrating the mind, soul and body and was the subject of a doctoral dissertation at Harvard University by Dr. Sarah Morelli. Das himself has demonstrated Kathak yoga by dancing, singing, and playing tabla simultaneously. His company also exhibits the practice of Kathak yoga by adding the playing of instruments to their dance. The dancers simultaneously perform three contrasting concepts – complex rhythmic compositions with the feet and body, continuous singing of the rhythmic cycle, and playing an instrument (harmonium or manjira).

== Selected awards ==
In 1987, and then again in 2003, Das was awarded the Isadora Duncan Dancer of the Year Award. In 2004 Das received the inaugural lifetime achievement award from the San Francisco Ethnic Dance Festival. In 2005, he was named a "Dance Icon of the West" by the San Francisco Performing Arts Library and Museum. In 2006 Das received the Goldie Lifetime Achievement Award from the San Francisco Bay Guardian. In 2007, Das received an award from Bharatiya Vidya Bhavan, a national arts institution inaugurated by Mahatma Gandhi in India in 1938, for outstanding contribution in the field of Kathak dance.

He was a recipient of a 2009 National Heritage Fellowship awarded by the National Endowment for the Arts, which is the United States government's highest honor in the folk and traditional arts. Das received the award, signed by President Obama, at a ceremony at the Library of Congress on Capitol Hill.

Many of Das's productions also received numerous awards, including Isadora Duncan Awards for his productions East as Center (2003) and India Jazz Suites (2005). He received a special award for presenting the largest Indian classical dance festival outside of India, Kathak at the Crossroads (2006).

Das also received numerous grants including from the Olympic Arts Festival, National Endowment for the Arts, National Dance Project, California Arts Council, Rockefeller Foundation, Irvine Fellowships in Dance, among others.

== Serving society through the arts ==
Das began working with the New Light Foundation, a Kolkata-based NGO that works to free the children of red-light district workers from the cycle of prostitution and abuse through support services, education and care, in 2003. Das and the teachers of Nritya Bharati taught the children of the New Light Foundation Kathak dance as a means for cultural and self-awareness and empowerment. The New Light group was invited by the German Ministry of Culture and International Cooperation to be a part of Kinder Kulture Karavane; in 2008, the New Light children travelled to Germany for a 6-week performing tour. Das also worked with the Calcutta Blind Opera (or Shyambazar Blind Opera), teaching Kathak to visually challenged performers through emphasis on its rhythmic and musical components.

Das's teachings emphasized the concepts of 'tyaag aur seva' (sacrifice and selfless service). Das encouraged the students of Chhandam to adopt his values of selflessness and sacrifice. He argued that these values must manifest both within the context of their study of Kathak and also permeate in other aspects of their lives by giving back to their communities and the society by and large.

== Personal life ==
Das married his first wife, Julia Maxwell, in 1971 and they divorced in 1987. He married his second wife, Celine Schein, in 1999, and they were married until his death. Das and Celine had two children, Shivaranjani, born 15 August 2011, and Saadhvi, born 4 July 2013.
