= Phil Black (dance teacher) =

American jazz and tap dance teacher

- Born: Brooklyn, New York, U.S.
- Died: June 5, 2015; Englewood, New Jersey, U.S.
- Occupations: Dance teacher, choreographer, performer
- Known for: Phil Black Dance Studio

Phil Black (died June 5, 2015) was an American jazz and tap dance teacher, choreographer, and performer. He worked as a choreographer and performer during the New York nightclub era.

== Early life and training ==
Black was born in Brooklyn, New York. He began dancing by age seven, learning from his Aunt Rose. He entered the U.S. Navy at 18 and later taught ballroom dancing at an Arthur Murray studio in California. After returning to New York, he studied with Alvin Ailey, Martha Graham, and Ernest Carlos.

== Career ==
Black worked as a choreographer and performer during the New York nightclub era. He appeared Off-Broadway in Old Bucks and New Wings in 1962. During this period, he worked with Judy Garland and Flip Wilson. His television work included The Tap Dance Kid and Unicorn Tales. He also staged and choreographed shows at the 1964 World's Fair and worked on commercials.

Ernest Carlos later turned over his space at 50th Street and Broadway to Black, whose dance studio became associated with theatre-district dancers.

Playbill later noted that Black won Emmy Awards for work on Unicorn Tales and The Tap Dance Kid, as well as an Astaire Award and a Flo-Bert Award.

== Teaching ==
Black founded Phil Black Dance Studio at Broadway and 50th Street in New York City in 1968. He later moved a few blocks north to Broadway Dance Center in the early 1980s.

Dance Informa described Black as one of the late-20th-century jazz and tap teachers who trained generations of dancers for Broadway, film, television, and concert dance.

His students included Chita Rivera, Ben Vereen, Jennifer Lopez, Goldie Hawn, and Irene Cara. Backstage included Black among "legendary" New York dance teachers and noted that he later taught at Broadway Dance Center.

== Death ==
Black died on June 5, 2015, at the Actors Fund Nursing Home in Englewood, New Jersey.
