= Prayag Sangeet Samiti =

Indian classical music institute

Coordinates: 25.451867°N 81.844242°E

- Prayag Sangeet Samiti Building
- Type: Culture Music and Art Organization
- Established: 1926 (100 years ago)
- Location: Prayagraj, India
- Website: prayagsangeetsamiti.in

Prayag Sangeet Samiti is an institute imparting education in Hindustani Classical music, in Prayagraj, India. It awards diplomas and certificates in vocal music, instrumental music as well as classical dance. It was established in 1926. This institution is registered under the Indian Societies Act (Act No.XXI of 1860). The major aim of this organization is to propagate various vocal and instrumental music streams that are widely recognized by state governments, universities and educational bodies. In 2007, it started awarding degrees and diplomas in Minor Subjects also. The Institute is mainly concentrated in North India and has produced a number of prominent artists from the states of Uttar Pradesh, Uttarakhand, Himachal Pradesh, Jammu and Kashmir, Punjab, Haryana, Delhi, Rajasthan, Gujarat, Bihar, West Bengal and other north-eastern states.

Its diplomas and degrees are recognized by a number of UGC accredited institutions and notable universities in music such as Banaras Hindu University, Central Board of Secondary Education among others. The university itself is recognized by NAAC(National Assessment and Accreditation Council) with a grade A++ rating and a CGPA of 3.65. They are considered equivalent to degrees of Bachelor of Music, Bachelor of Arts or Master of Arts at many institutions such as National Academy of Hindustani Music and Bhatkhande College of Music, Lucknow, Madhav Sangit Mahavidyalaya, Gwalior, Gandharva Mahavidyalaya Mandal, Poona, Bhartiya Sangeet Pathshala, Baroda and Indira Kala Sangeet Vidyalaya, Khairagarh. Prayag Sangeet Samiti is considered to be the best university to pursue Indian Classical Music by many individual institution.
