= IndiGo =

Low- cost Indian airline

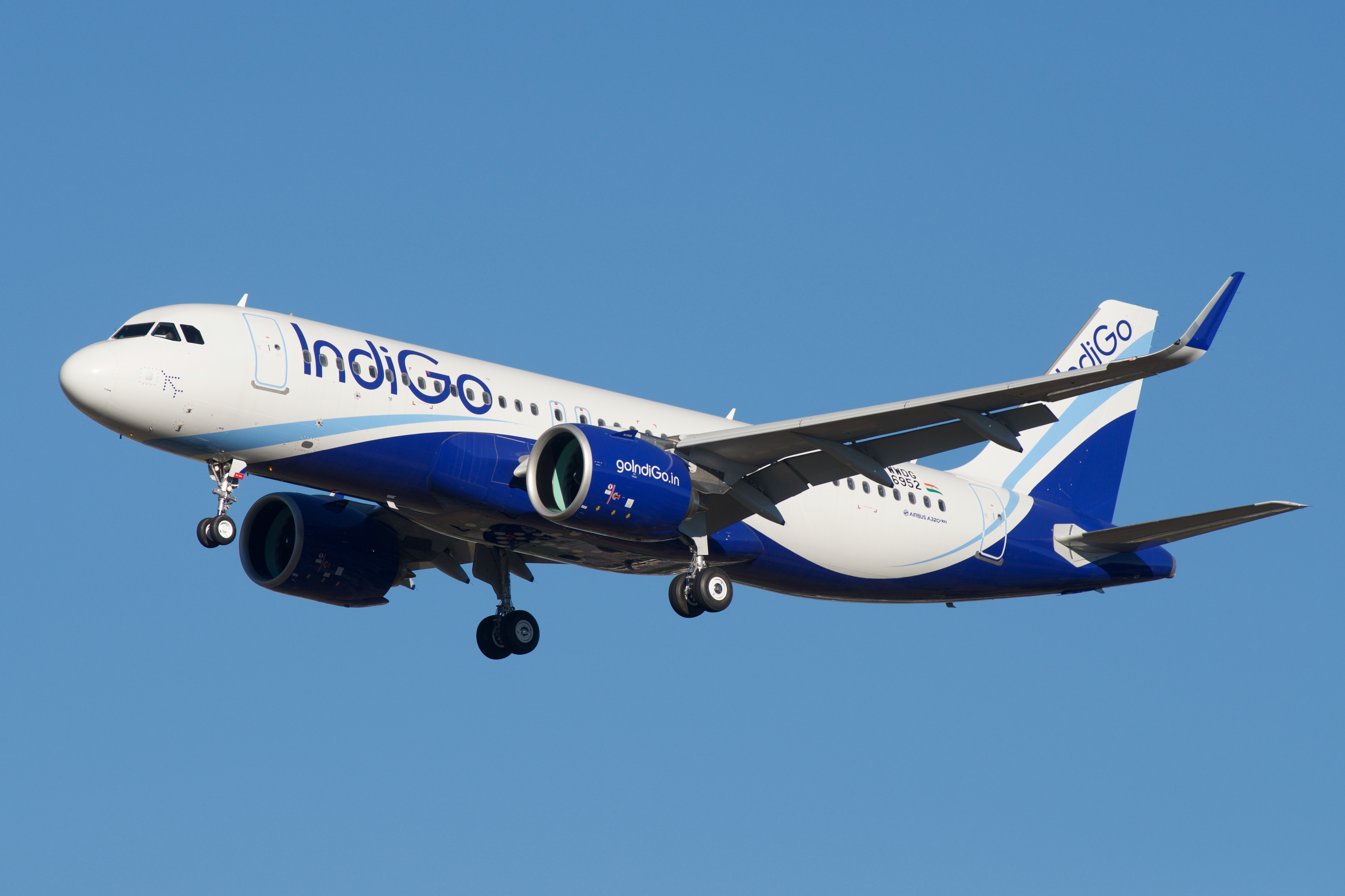
- IndiGo Airbus A320neo
IATA	ICAO	Call sign
6E	IGO	IFLY
- Founded: 2005
- Commenced operations: 4 August 2006; 20 years ago
- Hubs: Delhi
- Frequent-flyer program: BluChip
- Subsidiaries: IndiGo CarGo
- Fleet size: 425
- Destinations: 128
- Parent company: InterGlobe Enterprises
- Traded as: BSE: 539448; NSE: INDIGO; BSE SENSEX constituent; NSE NIFTY 50 constituent
- ISIN: INE646L01027
- Headquarters: Gurgaon, Haryana, India
- Key people: Rahul Bhatia (MD); Willie Walsh (CEO)
- Founders: Rahul Bhatia; Rakesh Gangwal
- Revenue: ▲₹841 billion (US$8.7 billion) (2025)
- Operating income: ▲₹213 billion (US$2.2 billion) (2025)
- Net income: ▲₹72.58 billion (US$750 million) (2025)
- Total assets: ▲₹1,158 billion (US$12 billion) (2025)
- Total equity: ▲₹93.68 billion (US$970 million) (2025)
- Employees: 37,300 (2024)
- Website: www.goindigo.in

IndiGo is an Indian low-cost airline headquartered in Gurgaon, Haryana. It is the largest airline in India by passengers carried, with a 64.2% domestic market share as of August 2025. It is one of the largest in the world in terms of passengers carried, with 31.9 million passengers carried in the fourth quarter of 2025. It is the sixth busiest airline in the world, as per data from RadarBox. As of November 2025, IndiGo operates over 2,700 daily flights to 137 destinations – 94 domestic and 43 international. It operates cargo services under its subsidiary, IndiGo CarGo. Its primary hub is located at Indira Gandhi International Airport in Delhi.

The airline was established as a private company by Rakesh Gangwal and Rahul Bhatia in 2005. It took delivery of its first aircraft in July 2006 and commenced operations a month later, on 4 August 2006. The airline became the largest Indian carrier by passenger market share in December 2012. The company went public company in October 2015. IndiGo was ranked the 15th most punctual airline globally in 2022 by OAG.

== History ==
IndiGo was founded in 2005 as a private company by Rahul Bhatia of InterGlobe Enterprises and Rakesh Gangwal, a United States-based expatriate Indian. InterGlobe had a 51.12% stake in IndiGo, while 47.88% was held by Gangwal's Virginia-based company, Caelum Investments. IndiGo placed a firm order for 100 Airbus A320-200 aircraft in June 2005 with plans to begin operations in mid-2006. The airline took delivery of its first aircraft on 28 July 2006, nearly a year after placing the initial order. It commenced operations on 4 August 2006 with a service from New Delhi to Imphal via Guwahati. By the end of 2006, the airline had six aircraft, and nine more were acquired in 2007.

By April 2007, IndiGo had carried one million passengers, and the airline crossed the ten million-passenger mark and received delivery of its 25th aircraft in 2009. In December 2010, it replaced the then state-run carrier Air India, as the third largest airline in India, behind Kingfisher Airlines and Jet Airways with a passenger market share of 17.3%. In 2011, IndiGo placed an order for 180 Airbus A320 aircraft in a deal worth US$15 billion. In January 2011, after completing five years of operations, the airline was permitted to launch international flights. In December 2011, the DGCA expressed reservations that the rapid expansion could impact passenger safety.

In February 2012, IndiGo took delivery of its 50th aircraft, less than six years after it began operations. For the quarter ending March 2012, IndiGo was the most profitable airline in India and became the second largest airline in India in terms of passenger market share. On 17 August 2012, IndiGo became the largest airline in India in terms of market share surpassing Jet Airways, six years after commencing operations. By December 2012, the airline had ferried 50 million passengers.

In January 2013, IndiGo was the second fastest-growing low-cost carrier in Asia behind Indonesian airline Lion Air. In February 2013, following the announcement of the Civil Aviation Ministry that it would allow IndiGo to take delivery of only five aircraft that year, the airline planned to introduce low-cost regional flights by setting up a subsidiary. Later, IndiGo announced that it planned to seek permission from the ministry to acquire four more aircraft, therefore taking delivery of nine aircraft in 2013. It took delivery of its 75th aircraft this month. By March 2014, IndiGo was the second-largest low-cost carrier in Asia in terms of seats flown.

In November 2014, IndiGo received its 100th aircraft. This completed IndiGo's initial 100-aircraft order, placed in 2005. In March 2015, the carrier crossed the 100 million-passenger mark. In August 2015, the company placed an order for 250 Airbus A320neo aircraft worth $27 billion, making it the largest single order in Airbus history. It announced a ₹30.18 billion (equivalent to ₹39 billion or US$400 million in 2026) initial public offering on 19 October 2015 which opened on 27 October 2015. In October 2017, the airline announced a plan to strengthen its regional operations with flight connections to new tier II towns. It took delivery of its first ATR 72-600 aircraft in November 2017, and commenced operations using the aircraft the next month.

In October 2019, IndiGo placed an order for 300 Airbus A320neo aircraft worth ₹2,300 billion (US$24 billion), surpassing its own record of the largest single order in Airbus history. In December 2019, the airline became the first Indian airline to operate 1,500 daily flights, and to have a fleet of more than 250 aircraft. In 2020, it added ten domestic and eight international destinations. It added 45 aircraft to the fleet, taking its total fleet to 262 aircraft, and ferried over 75 million passengers in the year.

In January 2023, the airline became the first Indian airline to have a fleet of more than 300 aircraft. In February 2023, the airline inducted its first wide-body aircraft, a wet-leased Boeing 777-300ER, to its fleet. In June 2023, the airline placed an order for 500 Airbus A320neo family aircraft, the largest aircraft order in commercial aviation history. As of November 2023, IndiGo had a 61.8% domestic market share. In December 2023, IndiGo became the first Indian airline to have carried over 100 million passengers in a calendar year. In April 2024, it placed an order for 30 A350-900 aircraft, with an additional option for 70 aircraft in a deal valued at $5 billion. The delivery of these aircraft is expected to commence in 2027. On 14 November 2024, the airline introduced business class in select flights.

In December 2025, IndiGo experienced a major scheduling crisis, which led to the cancellation of thousands of flights. The issue arose after its failure to adjust to the new flight crew time limitations mandated by the DGCA. The crisis started on 2 December and the airline, which had a domestic market share of more than 60%, cancelled nearly 4,500 flights over the next ten days. In the aftermath of the operational disruptions, CEO Pieter Elbers resigned on 10 March 2026, with managing director Rahul Bhatia assuming management of the airline as the interim CEO. On 31 March 2026, IndiGo named Irish aviation executive Willie Walsh as its next chief executive officer. At the time he was the director general of the International Air Transport Association (IATA) (and was contracted to remain at IATA until 31 July 2026). On 3 August 2026, Walsh assumed office as CEO, succeeding Bhatia, who continued as the airline's managing director.

In August 2026, a report indicated that IndiGo was in a preliminary discussion with Embraer for a possible purchase of a large number of E-Jet E2 aircraft as a replacement for its existing ATR 72-600 fleet. Embraer has also signed an agreement with Adani Group of India for a local production line for Embraer E-Jet family subject to a cumulative firm order for 200 aircraft from Indian airlines.

== Corporate affairs ==
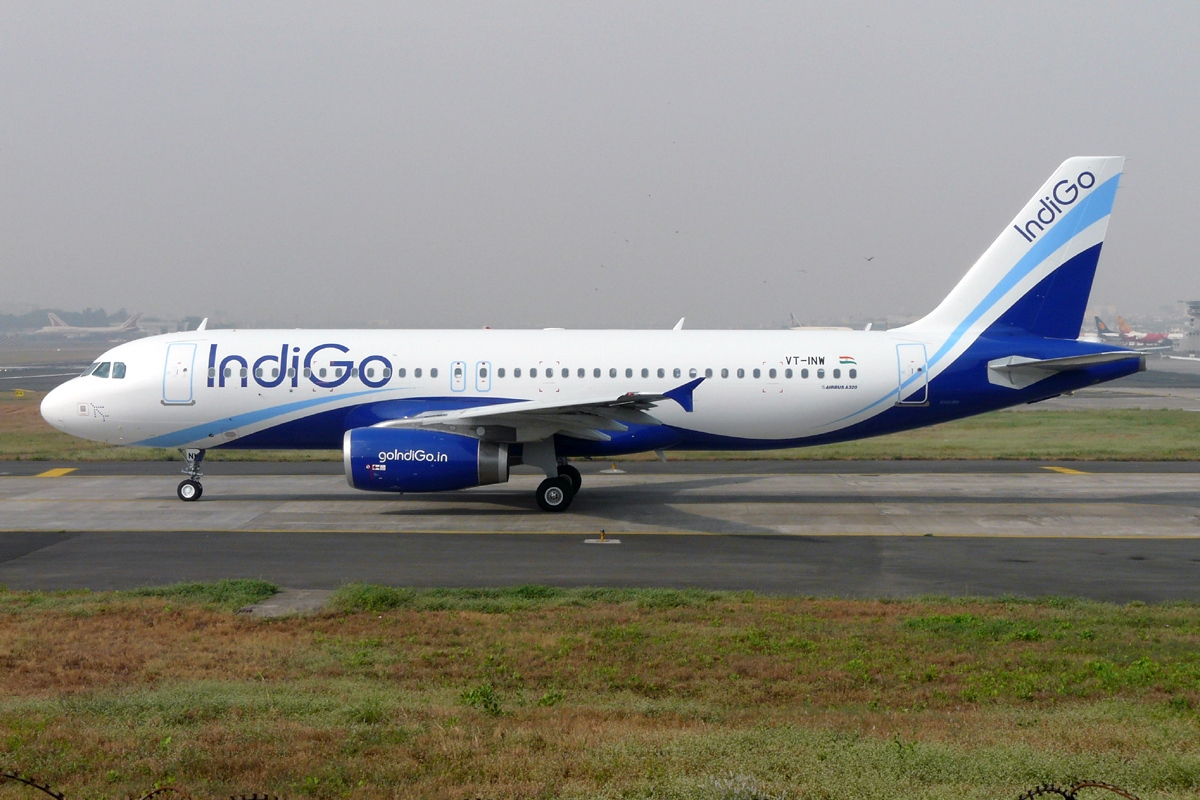
IndiGo's primary livery consists of an indigo and sky blue livery as seen on an Airbus A320 aircraft

IndiGo is headquartered in Gurgaon, India. The company is publicly listed on the National Stock Exchange of India.

=== Logo and livery ===
Twenty dots arranged in the shape of an aircraft serve as the airline's logo. The airline's primary livery is an indigo and sky blue colour scheme which uses an indigo paint job that starts from the underbody fuselage and continues till the end of the tail section, along with sky blue accents around the fuselage and on the tail. The winglets and engines of the aircraft are indigo in colour with the airline's website link, "goIndiGo.in", written on the engines in white in the same font as the IndiGo badging. The IndiGo badging is written in the same indigo colour on both sides of the fuselage and the tail. The airline uses a secondary two-tone blue livery on a white background with the belly of the aircraft painted in indigo with the logo in white.

The flight attendants wear a single-piece navy-blue tunic with a cap and a thin indigo belt.

== Operations and financials ==
IndiGo became one of the fastest growing low-cost carriers in the world and the largest airline in India. Its success has been attributed to its unique business model which reduces costs. The airline operates a single type of aircraft, the Airbus A320 family, in similar seating configuration which simplifies crew training and maintenance. The airline strikes bulk deals with Airbus, reducing unit costs. The airline targets a quick, 20-minute turn-around time to prepare the aircraft for the next flight, ensuring planes fly about 12 hours per day. Employees share multiple roles with a check-in staff doubling as baggage handlers. In July 2023, Indian aviation watchdog DGCA imposed a ₹3 million (US$31,000) fine on IndiGo for certain systemic deficiencies concerning documentation pertaining to operations, training, and engineering procedures. Also, in March 2025, the Income Tax Department imposed a penalty of ₹9.44 billion (US$98 million) on InterGlobe Aviation, IndiGo's parent company, for the assessment year 2021–22.

The key trends for IndiGo are (as of the financial year ending 31 March):

Year	Revenue (₹ cr)	Profit after tax (₹ cr)	Employees	Passengers (mn)	Load factor (%)	Fleet size	CO2 emissions (g) per ASK (Note: Available Seat Kilometres)
2016	16,140	1,986	12,362	33.1	84.0	107	74.6
2017	18,580	1,659	14,604	43.5	84.8	131	
2018	23,021	2,242	18,060	52.1	87.4	159	
2019	28,497	156	23,531	64.7	86.2	217	72.0
2020	35,756	−248	27,812	75	85.8	262	70.0
2021	14,641	−5,830	23,711	29.3	69.4	285	64.7
2022	25,931	−6,171	26,164	46.6	73.6	275	61.1
2023	54,446	−317	32,407	85.2	82.1	304	59.5
2024	68,904	8,172	37,200	106	85.9	367	60.5
2025	80,803	7,258	41,049	118	86.0	434	61.7

== Network ==
Countries in which IndiGo operates as of March 2026

As of November 2025, IndiGo operates more than 2,700 daily flights to 137 destinations, 94 in India and 43 abroad. Its main hub is at Delhi, with additional bases at Bengaluru, Chennai, Hyderabad, Kolkata, Mumbai, and Kochi. In January 2011, IndiGo received a licence to operate international flights after completing five years of operations. IndiGo's first international service was launched between New Delhi and Dubai on 1 September 2011.

=== Codeshare agreements ===
IndiGo codeshares with the following airlines:

- Aegean Airlines
- Air France
- American Airlines
- British Airways
- China Southern Airlines
- Garuda Indonesia
- Japan Airlines
- Jetstar
- Malaysia Airlines
- Qantas
- Qatar Airways
- Turkish Airlines
- Virgin Atlantic

== Fleet ==
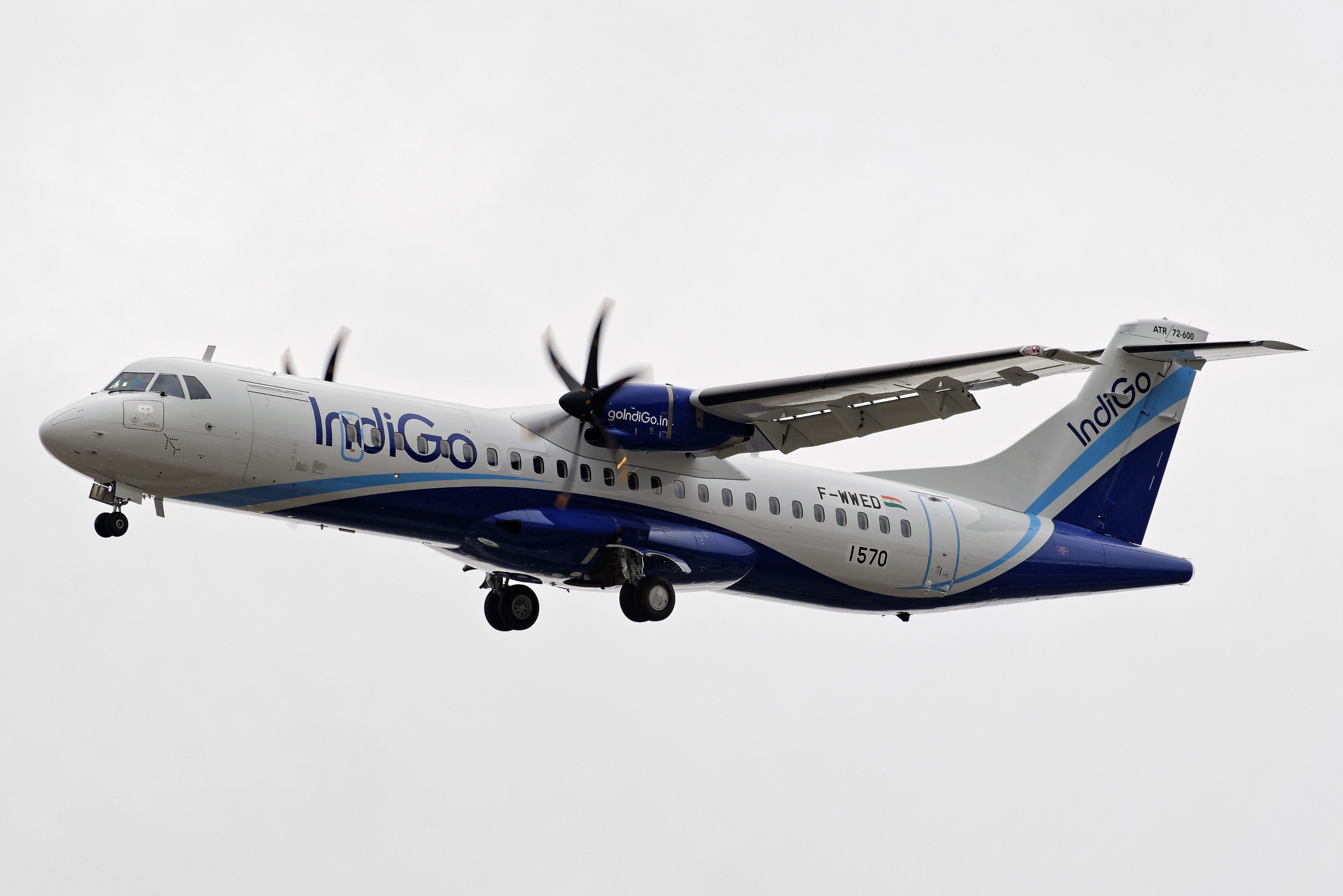
ATR 72-600 operated by IndiGo

In 2024, the A320neo accounted for 45% of all flights, but its dominance was overtaken by the A321neo near the end of 2025. The share of A320neo has dropped to a little over a third of flights by early 2026, while the A321neo has a share of over 40%. Indigo has over 160 A321neo aircraft in its fleet, the largest A321neo fleet in the world.

As of July 2026, IndiGo operates a fleet of 425 aircraft. It has a majority-Airbus fleet with ATR 72-600 turboprop aircraft and narrow-body aircraft Airbus A320 family. It also operates two Boeing 777s on wet-lease from Turkish Airlines. It wet leased six Boeing 787 aircraft from Norse Atlantic, with its inaugural flight on 1 March 2025. It also operates wet-leased Boeing 737 MAX from Qatar Airways and Corendon Airlines, and Airbus A320 from Smartlynx Airlines and Freebird Airlines, to meet the demand. It has 60 Airbus A350-900 aircraft on order, with deliveries expected to start from 2027. It also plans to order more narrow-body aircraft to further expand its global outreach. IndiGo also operates three Airbus A321 freighter aircraft as part of its dedicated subsidiary, IndiGo CarGo, for cargo operations.

IndiGo Airlines on Dhaka

== Services ==
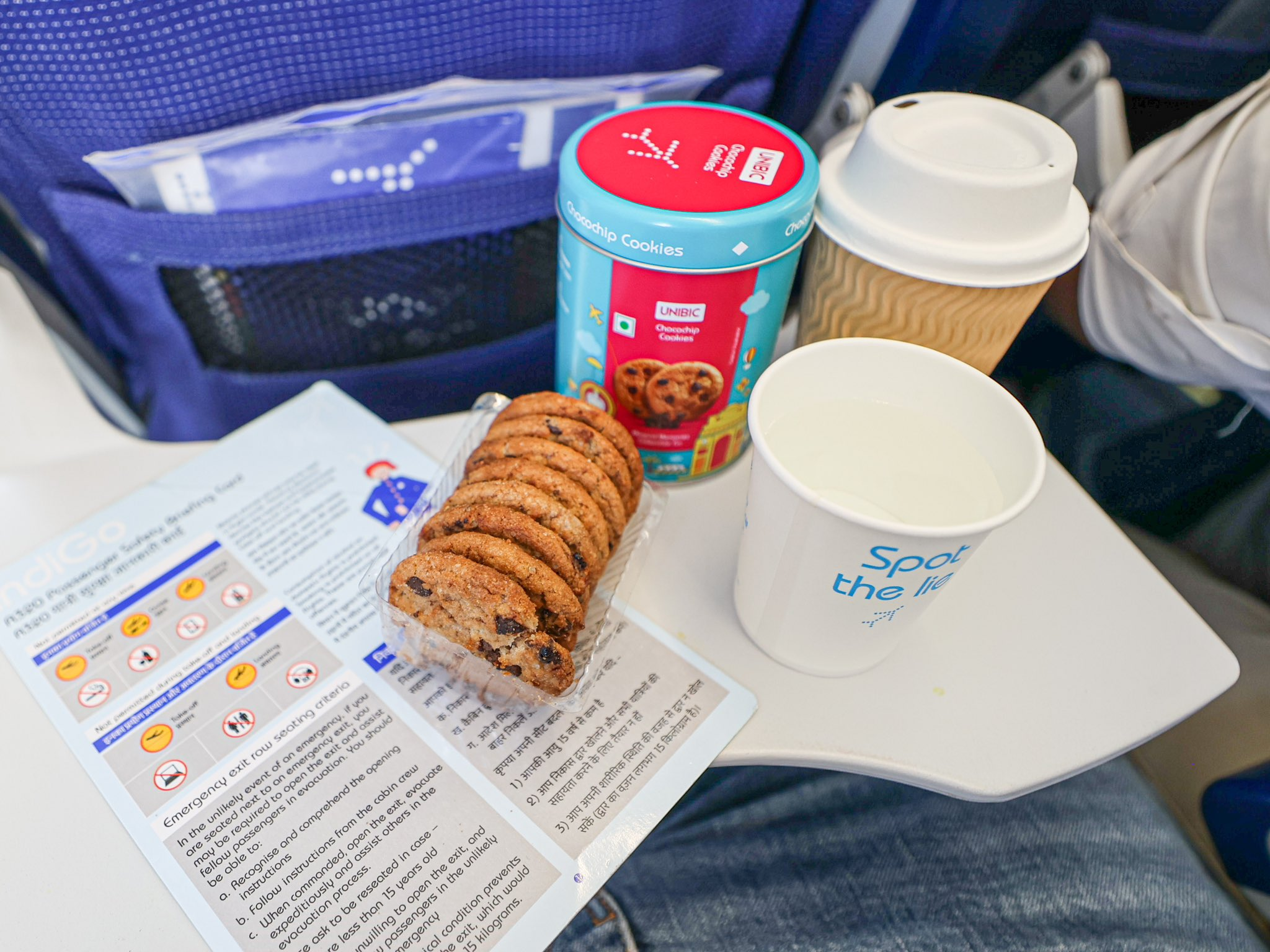
IndiGo in-flight snack

IndiGo mainly offers economy class seating. In 2024, it launched IndiGoStretch, with business class seats, in limited flights. Benefits include complimentary meals, advance seat selection, and zero convenience fee as a standard. While it has a buy-on board in-flight meal programme, no hot meals are available as, to minimise costs, and the IndiGo aircraft are not equipped with ovens. However, hot drinks, heated meals, and instant meals are available. The airline does not offer in-flight entertainment in economy seating, and publishes Hello 6E in-flight magazine. IndiGo offers premium services such as pre-assigned seats, multiple cancellations, free snacks, priority check-in, and extra baggage allowance for extra fee. In September 2019, the company announced a tie-up with SonyLIV, an on-demand video app, to provide passengers with entertainment options aboard flights and at the airport. In 2025, IndiGo introduced "All I Want Is Touchdown" as its boarding anthem.

== Incidents ==
- On 21 May 2025, an IndiGo flight 6E2142 from Delhi to Srinagar encountered severe turbulence when a sudden hailstorm struck it mid-air causing panic amongst those onboard. The pilot declared an emergency and landed the aircraft at the Srinagar International Airport without any reported injuries. The aircraft suffered visible damage to the nose due to hailstorm and was declared aircraft on ground for urgent repairs.

== See also ==
- List of airports in India
- Aviation in India
- List of companies of India
- Transport in India
