= JoJo Smith =

American dancer, choreographer, and dance teacher

- Born: July 20, 1938
- Died: January 22, 2019 (aged 80); Englewood, New Jersey, U.S.
- Occupations: Dancer, choreographer, dance teacher
- Known for: Dance consultant for Saturday Night Fever; JoJo's Dance Factory

JoJo Smith (July 20, 1938 – January 22, 2019) was an American dancer, choreographer, and dance teacher whose career spanned Broadway, film, television, and touring work. A dance consultant for the 1977 film Saturday Night Fever, Smith was described by Dance Magazine as "The King of New York" for his contributions to Broadway and the dance industry.

== Early life ==
Smith was born to dancers Anna Margaret Grayson and Joseph Benjamin Smith. His mother, Anna Grayson, danced with the Katherine Dunham Dance Company, and Katherine Dunham created a special routine for Smith when he was 13.

== Career ==
Smith made his Broadway debut as a Shark in the 1964 City Center revival of West Side Story. He later appeared in Something More! and A Joyful Noise, assisting Michael Bennett on the latter production.

Smith made his Broadway debut as a choreographer with The Fifth Dimension with JoJo's Dance Factory, and was credited as choreographer on Got Tu Go Disco, which featured Irene Cara.

Smith was a dance consultant for the 1977 film Saturday Night Fever. Playbill described Smith as helping define disco in Hollywood films, and noted his work in Hollywood as a contemporary choreographer and coach during the 1970s disco era.

== Teaching ==
Smith founded JoJo's Dance Factory at 1733 Broadway, where he taught dancers and performers. The studio occupied the space that later became Broadway Dance Center. His students included Debbie Allen, John Travolta, and Barbra Streisand.

A 1978 article in The New Yorker described a disco dance lesson at JoJo's Dance Factory, where Smith led students through steps connected to Saturday Night Fever.

== Death ==
Smith died on January 22, 2019, at the Actors Fund Home in Englewood, New Jersey. He was 80.
