= Broadway Dance Center =

Coordinates: 40°45′34″N 73°59′23″W

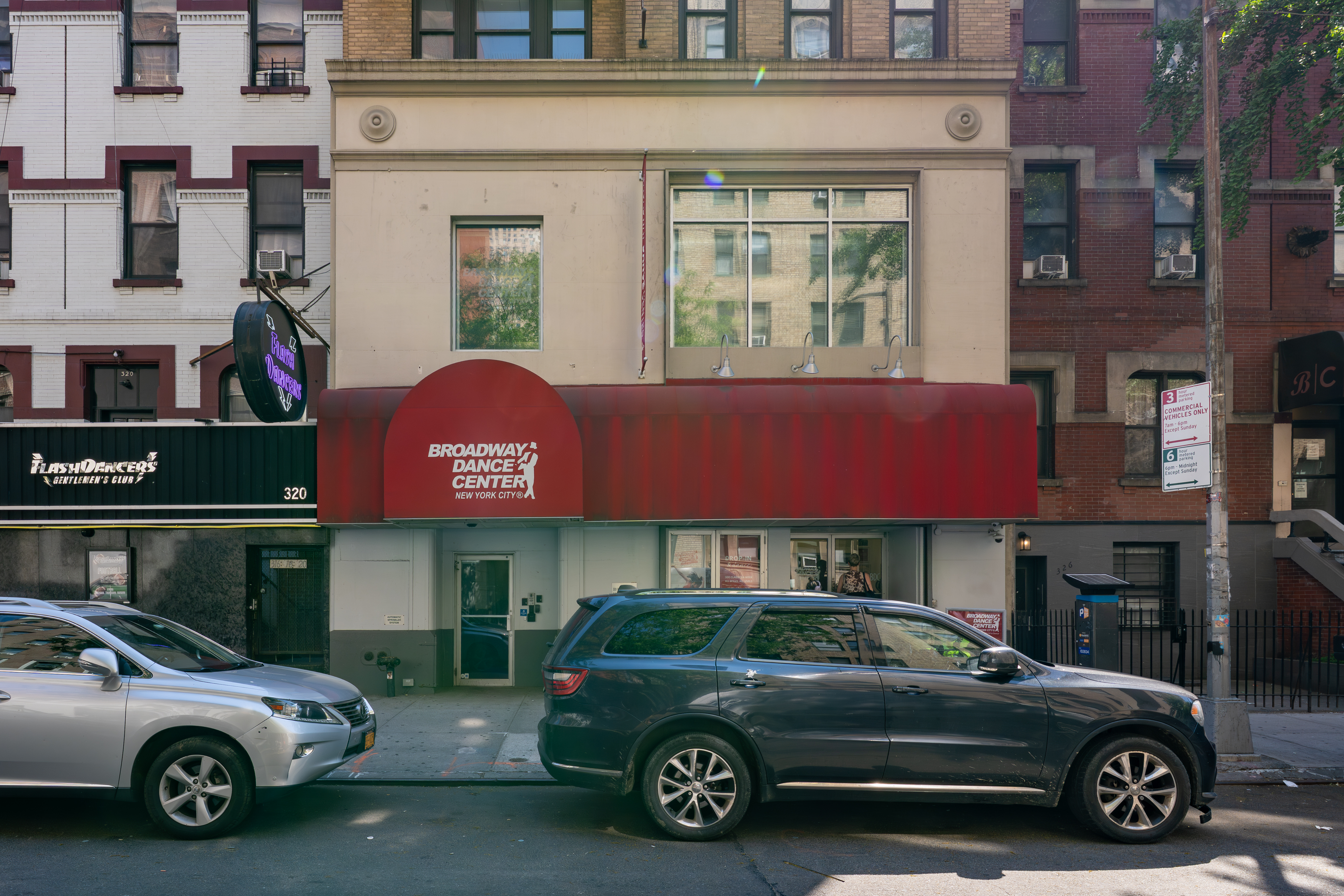
- 322 West 45th Street, New York, New York; United States

Information
- Type: Dance school
- Established: 1984
- Principal: Diane King, Director
- Campus type: Urban
- Website: https://www.broadwaydancecenter.com/

Broadway Dance Center (BDC) is a dance school located at 322 West 45th Street in New York City's Theater District. It was established in 1984, when Richard Ellner assumed ownership of the Hines-Hatchett dance studio and renamed it Broadway Dance Center. The school offers drop-in classes in ballet, contemporary dance, hip-hop and street styles, jazz, tap and theater.

Dancers and performers such as Bette Midler, Brooke Shields, Jennifer Jones, Britney Spears, Madonna, *NSYNC, Camille Kostek, Jason Samuels Smith, JoJo Siwa, Janet Jackson and Elizabeth Berkley have taken classes or rehearsed at the school, with Broadway performers taking classes there daily.

== Locations and facilities ==
- Main Campus: Occupying three floors and over 30,000 ft^{2} at its 322 West 45th Street location, BDC has seven studios, ranging from 1,400 ft^{2} to 2,000 ft^{2} with sprung Marley flooring, pianos, barres, locker rooms, showers and skylights.
- Children & Teens: Opened in August 2017, this Lincoln Center facility at 37 West 65th Street offers annual programs, summer camps, workshops, private lessons, and birthday parties for dancers aged 3–18.

== Programs and classes ==
- Drop-in classes: BDC provides over 350 weekly drop-in classes for dancers aged 13 and older.
- Educational programs include:
  - The Professional Semester is a four-month program for experienced dancers aged 18–27. It includes technique classes, mock auditions, seminars and networking opportunities.
  - The Independent Training Program (ITP) is open to dancers of varying experience levels and offers a flexible schedule.
  - The Summer Training Program provides concentrated study for advanced dancers aged 18 and older.
  - The Junior Training Program consists of two-week sessions in which dancers aged 13–17 take 15 classes per week and focus on a selected dance style.

== Class levels ==
BDC defines its class tiers based on years of training:

- Basic - 0–2 years of training
- Beginner - 2–5 years of training with basic understanding of discipline and general dance terminology
- Advanced Beginner - 5–8 years of training with complete understanding of discipline and general dance terminology
- Intermediate - 8–10 years of training
- Intermediate/Advanced - 8–10 years of training
- Advanced - 10+ years of training, pre-professional and professional

== History ==
In New York City in the early 1980s, dancers came to NYC to audition for Broadway stages. Choreographers including Michael Bennett, Bob Fosse, and Jerome Robbins created works for the stage, while instructors including Luigi, Charles Kelley, Jamie Rogers, Henry LeTang, Phil Black, David Howard, and Frank Hatchett trained dancers to perform for these choreographers.

Long-time New York City resident Richard Ellner took his first tap class at 52 years of age. He was a great fan of Broadway musicals, such as Dancin', Sophisticated Ladies, The Tap Dance Kid, and Cats. He was a business executive who fueled his love of the arts by taking jazz and tap classes. Ellner took his first jazz class with Francine Sama (aka Frankie Anne) when the studio site at 1733 Broadway was known as Jo Jo's Dance Factory. Ellner's desire to expand his training led him to the legendary jazz teacher Frank Hatchett at Hines-Hatchett. He later took on this location, newly named Hines & Hatchett, which was co-owned by Hatchett and Maurice Hines.

In the '80s, Hines-Hatchett was like many small studios throughout the city. Studio owners had the demanding dual role of teaching while administrating their schools.

In 1984, Ellner assumed ownership of Hines-Hatchett, renamed it Broadway Dance Center, and set off to create a studio that would provide a new home for teachers and dancers. Each instructor was encouraged to contribute his or her personal style and expertise. Students enjoyed the convenience of frequenting one studio for diversified training rather than traveling throughout the city.

In the early years, teachers joined BDC's Faculty and solidified the studio's standing in the dance community. Word-of-mouth brought students from around the globe. Ellner wished to share the joy of dance class with everyone, not only professionals.

Over the next fifteen years, the studio grew from a one-story building to three stories of creative and business space, and flourished under Ellner's leadership. His daughter Allison came on board and together they formed a strong partnership.

In 1998, the property the studio rented was sold to make way for a high-rise/office building. Being uprooted and forced to relocate, the studio faced a challenging and disappointing time. Ellner died just three weeks after the move to 57th Street, at the age of 69, of a heart attack. The responsibility of securing the studio's future fell to Allison, who wanted to honor her father's legacy.

After seven successful years at 57th Street, BDC was again faced with the dilemma of being forced to relocate in 2006. After a short interim period and with support from the dance community, faculty and staff, BDC was able to rebuild its current state-of-the-art facility in the heart of Times Square. In August 2017, a second location was opened focusing on children and teen dancers near Lincoln Center.
