= Alice Williams =

Alice Williams may refer to:

== People ==
- Alice Faye Williams, birth name of Afeni Shakur (1947–2016); American political activist
- Alice Williams (welfare worker) (1863–1957), British welfare worker
- Alice Meredith Williams (1877–1934), British sculptor, painter, illustrator and stained glass designer
- Alice Williams or Buda Godman (1888–1945), American criminal, actress, and singer
- Alis Mallt Williams (Alice Matilda Langland Williams), Welsh political writer and celtophile
- Alice Williams (sprinter), American sprinter, 200m runner-up at the 1928 USA Outdoor Track and Field Championships
- Alice Williams (water polo), Australian water polo player, Olympic medalist
- Alice Crane Williams (1879–1964), American composer and literary editor

== Fictional characters ==
- Alice Williams, a character in The Bounty Hunter
- Alice Williams, a character in Detroit 1-8-7

== See also ==
- Alice Williams Brotherton (1848–1930), American author
- Beryl Alice Williams, Australian politician
- Mary Alice Williams (born 1949), news anchor
- Matilda Alice Williams (1875–1973), deaconess
- Alys Williams (disambiguation)
- Alice Williamson (disambiguation)
