= Gorham Munson =

Gorham Bockhaven Munson (May 26, 1896 – August 15, 1969) was an American literary critic.

== Biography ==
Gorham was born in Amityville, New York to Hubert Barney Munson and Carrie Louise Morrow. He received his B.A. degree in 1917 from Wesleyan University, where he became a member of Delta Kappa Epsilon. He married Elizabeth Hurwitz on April 2, 1921, in Brooklyn. Gorham died on August 15, 1969, at Hartford, Connecticut, and is buried in Mountain View Cemetery in Camden, Maine.

Gorham became a part of the Greenwich Village scene of avant-garde writers. In 1922 he founded and edited, with Matthew Josephson (August 1922-January 1923) and Kenneth Burke (January–September 1923) as co-editors, the eight issues of the literary review Secession (spring 1922- April 1924). Its contributors included Malcolm Cowley, Hart Crane, E. E. Cummings, Marianne Moore, Wallace Stevens, William Carlos Williams and Yvor Winters.

He joined the faculty of The New School in 1927 and spent the remainder of his career as an academic.

For more than ten years, Munson was a student of A.R. Orage, in classes based on G.I. Gurdjieff's esoteric teachings. In the February 1950 issue of Tomorrow magazine, he wrote about what he called the "Black Sheep Philosophers"—G.I. Gurdjieff, A.R. Orage, and P.D. Ouspensky.

Who's Who in America (Volume V, 1969–73) lists Gorham as author of twelve books and three others on which he collaborated or was the editor. He was also a free-lance journalist whose articles appeared in Saturday Review, The Atlantic Monthly, Yale Review, New York Evening Post Literary Review, and Commonweal.
