= A Certain Slant of Light =

A Certain Slant of Light may refer to:

- "A Certain Slant of Light" (song), a 1994 single by The Tea Party
- A Certain Slant of Light (novel), a 2005 novel by Laura Whitcomb

== See also ==
- "There's a certain Slant of light", a lyrical poem by Emily Dickinson
