= There's a certain Slant of light =

Poem

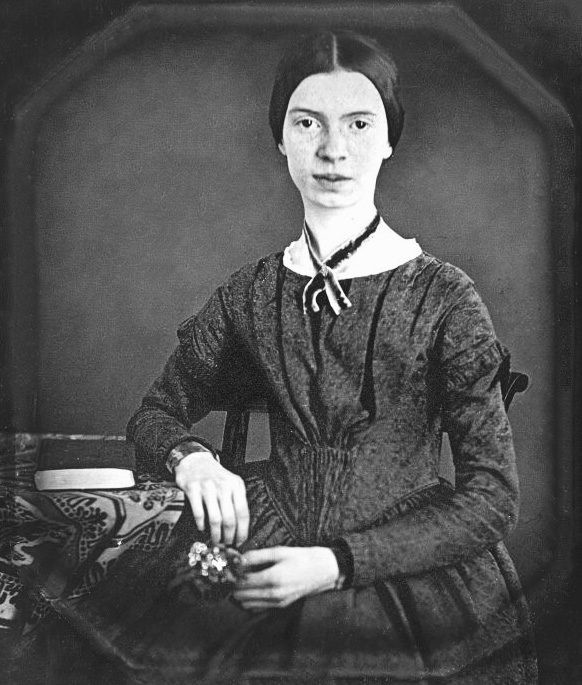
Daguerreotype of the poet Emily Dickinson, taken circa 1848.

"There's a certain Slant of light" is a lyrical poem written by the American poet Emily Dickinson (1830–1886). The poem's speaker likens winter sunlight to cathedral music, and considers the spiritual effects of the light. Themes of religion and death are present in the poem, especially in connection to the theological concept of despair.

== Text of the poem ==
Close transcription

There's a certain Slant of light,
Winter Afternoons,
That oppresses, like the Heft
Of Cathedral Tunes.

Heavenly Hurt, it gives us -
We can find no scar,
But internal difference
Where the Meanings are.

None may teach it Any -
'Tis the Seal Despair -
An imperial affliction
Sent us of the Air -

When it comes, the Landscape listens -
Shadows - hold their breath -
When it goes, 'tis like the Distance
On the look of Death.

== Publication history ==
The poem was originally discovered by Lavinia Dickinson among Emily Dickinson's personal, unpublished fascicles (F13.03.010) following her death. It was published posthumously in 1890 by her friends Mabel Loomis Todd and Thomas Wentworth Higginson in Poems by Emily Dickinson: Series 1 as the 31st poem in section three: Nature. In their edition it was given the title "Winter." It was published again in Thomas H. Johnson's 1955 collection The Poems of Emily Dickinson, which numbered Dickinson's poems according to assumed chronology, which placed "There's a certain Slant of light" at number 258. R. W. Franklin's 1998 edition The Poems of Emily Dickinson: Variorum Edition also organized the poems by assumed chronology and numbered the poem 320. Since the poem was untitled in the original manuscript, it is commonly referred to by the first line or by one of the numbers assigned by Johnson and Franklin.

== Form and summary ==
The poem is written in four quatrains. The poem is sometimes formatted without stanza breaks or em-dashes, though it has both in Dickinson's original manuscript.

The poem's metrical pattern resembles ballad meter, however, only the final stanza fully follows the meter of a trochaic ballad. The other stanzas are more irregular in observance of ballad meter. The first stanza, although it is in ballad meter (4-3-4-3), seems stilted when following the four downbeats of trochaic ballad; it is read most naturally with anapests at the start of line 1 and at the beginning and end of line 3. Stanzas two and three appear to shorten the beginning of each line (3-3-4-3), creating an abrupt effect. End-rhyme follows a scheme of abcb defe ghih jklk, a typical ballad pattern.

There is alliteration, consonance, and assonance scattered throughout the poem. There is idiosyncratic capitalization, especially for nouns. Many of the themes in the poem are created through the initial simile of winter light "that oppresses, like the Heft / Of Cathedral Tunes -" This simile creates a synesthetic effect, mixing sound, sight, and weight. This simile first introduces religious connotations to the poem. Literary critic Helen Vendler has noted in Dickinson: Selected Poems and Commentaries that "Despair" was commonly known in the 19th century as one of two sins that could prevent someone from entering Heaven, the other being "Presumption." With Vendler's interpretation, Dickinson conceptualizes this religious Despair, the ultimate loss of hope, to what one feels at the onset of winter by connecting abstract terms to sensory details, such as "Slant of light" to "Heavenly Hurt" and "Shadows" to "the look of Death." Other scholars, such as Paula Bennett in Emily Dickinson: Woman Poet, have explored the inaccessibility of the poem without a grounded speaker or setting and the ambiguous nature of the "hurt" and "imperial affliction" described by the speaker. Scholar Ed Folsom has analyzed the poem's closing comparison of the light's departure to "the look of Death" to argue that winter in Dickinson's poetry more broadly "is the season that forces reality, that strips all hope of transcendence."

Besides describing the afternoon light and the indirect nature of the poem's discussion of death, Thomas H. Johnson has also noted that the term "slant" can have a mocking tone when defined as an oblique reflection or gibe. Thus the light and the heavenly hurt it causes may be interpreted as mocking, much like man's awareness of the irreversible Fall to mortality, which is the ultimate despair, especially if redemption is not an option. This realization may set an irrevocable seal of despair upon a person, but since it is "Sent us of the Air" it is still heavenly, and the seal of ecstasy may yet be waiting—though this poem does not touch on that alternative.

There is also personification in the poem as the landscape "listens" and the shadows "hold their breath," to a degree that it seems as though the landscape is the protagonist in the absence of any human figures in the poem. The pathos of the landscape and shadows waiting to disappear when the already slanting light is finally gone parallels how despair reduces spiritual hope. The poem contrasts transformations in both the intangible, interior world and the exterior world in order to show the relationship between them. It is indeterminate whether the speaker's despair is inspired by the landscape or whether the ominous appearance of the landscape is a projection of the speaker's despair. Scholar Sharon Cameron, however, notes in Lyric Time: Dickinson and the Limits of Genre that the poem enacts both of these impressions, expressing how interior changes may be invisible, but they are affected by the visible, exterior world.

== Punctuation ==
In the original manuscript of "There's a certain Slant of light," stored at Harvard's Houghton Library, the em-dashes at the end of certain lines are not prominent. The 1890 publication of the poem uses commas rather than dashes, and is considered a more heavily revised version than later ones. The em-dashes are restored in Johnson's 1955 edition and appear in subsequent publications.

== Critical reception ==
Donald E. Thackrey referred to "There's a certain Slant of light" as one of Dickinson's best lyric poems for its force of emotion but resistance to definitive statements on meaning. He likened it to Keats's "Ode to Melancholy," claiming that although it is less specific, it transmits the experience of the emotion just as effectively. He further claims that the poem contains none of the self-conscious mannerisms some of her other work exhibits.

Critic Charles R. Anderson, in Emily Dickinson's Poetry: Stairway of Surprise, claimed it was Dickinson's "finest poem on despair." Similarly, Inder Nath Kher, in The Landscape of Absence: Emily Dickinson’s Poetry, lauds it as one of Emily Dickinson's best poems and a well-balanced expression of absence and presence.

Ernest Sandeen, in his essay "Delight Deterred by Retrospect," called "There's a certain Slant of light" Dickinson's best poem on the winter season for the ways in which it goes beyond mere description of winter to embody more metaphysical subjects.

Critic Yvor Winters claims in In Defense of Reason that it is amongst three of Dickinson's most successful poems, alongside "A Light exists in Spring" and "As imperceptibly as grief." Winters also claims that despite some defects in her writing, Emily Dickinson is the greatest lyric poet of all time.

== Derivative works ==
Canadian rock band The Tea Party has a song on their 1993 album Splendor Solis titled A Certain Slant of Light.

A Certain Slant of Light is also the title of a 2005 young adult novel by Laura Whitcomb.

"There's a Certain Slant of Light" is the title of a song by Portland band Great Wilderness.

"There's a Certain Slant of Light" is the first composition in Alice Parker's "Heavenly Hurt: Songs of Love and Loss", seven songs for mixed chorus with cello and piano. Commissioned by Da Camera Singers of Amherst, MA, Sheila L. Heffernon, conductor; first performances May 29-31, 2013 in Charlemont, Amherst and Northhampton, MA.

David Sylvian set the poem to music on his 2011 album Died in the Wool – Manafon Variations.
