= The Broken Tower (film) =

- Film poster for The Broken Tower
- Directed by: James Franco
- Screenplay by: James Franco
- Based on: The Broken Tower by Paul L. Mariani
- Produced by: James Franco; Caroline Aragon; Vince Jolivette; Miles Levy; Christina Voros
- Starring: James Franco; Michael Shannon
- Cinematography: Christina Voros
- Edited by: James Franco
- Music by: Neil Benezra
- Production companies: Rabbit Bandini Productions; Made-in-Film-Land
- Distributed by: Focus World
- Release dates: June 20, 2011 (LAFF); April 27, 2012 (United States)
- Running time: 99 minutes
- Country: United States
- Language: English

The Broken Tower is a 2011 American biographical drama film directed, written, produced, edited by and starring James Franco. The film was made by Franco as his master's thesis for his MFA in filmmaking from New York University. The film is about American poet Hart Crane. Franco appears in the starring role as Crane along with Michael Shannon as one of Crane's lovers. The Broken Tower made its world premiere in April 2011 at Boston College. It was shown at the 2011 Los Angeles Film Festival (LAFF) in June 2011. It was released to theatres in the United States on April 27, 2012, and released on DVD in 2012. The film includes the recitation by Franco of several of Crane's poems both as voice-over additions to the film, as well as actual readings of several poems rendered by Franco as portraying Crane himself.

== Plot ==
The film begins with a plot structure based on a progression of chapters titled as "Voyages" in Hart Crane's life loosely related to Crane's lyric poem of the same name. In the first "Voyages", a depiction is made of an early attempt by Crane to take his own life. Among the other opening "Voyages", the audience is also shown depictions of several same-sex relationships which Crane had throughout his lifetime in semi-graphic portrayal consistent with the film's rating. Crane's life is shown progressing through the various "Voyages" in the film, largely portrayed through his troubled relationship with the father, his close relationship to his mother, and his frustrating relationship to his job in advertising as a copyrighter in New York City. In the final "Voyages," Crane's difficult relationship to alcoholism is depicted, ending with his final "Voyage" on a small cruise ship at sea in the vicinity of Mexico where Crane ended his life by his own hand.

== Cast ==
- James Franco – Hart Crane
- Michael Shannon – Emile Opffer
- Dave Franco – Young Hart
- Richard Abate – Father Crane
- Betsy Franco – Mother Crane
- Paul Mariani – Alfred Stieglitz
- Shandor Garrison – Gorham Munson
- Stacey Miller – Mrs. Cowley

== Production ==
Franco thought of the idea for the film while reading Paul Mariani's biography of Crane, also entitled The Broken Tower after the name of one of Crane's poems, on the set of his 2002 movie Sonny. Franco had publicly stated that the poet's tragic life story attracted him to the material. The DVD release of the film includes a supplement which has an interview of Mariani with Franco.

== Release ==
The film's world premiere was held at Boston College on April 15, 2011. Franco chose to debut it at that venue since Mariani is a professor of English there. The Broken Tower was screened at the 2011 Los Angeles Film Festival on June 20. It was among more than 200 feature films, short projects, and music videos from more than 30 countries to be selected. It was released on DVD March 2012.

== Critical response ==
Critical response to the film was largely negative. The Broken Tower has an approval rating of 20% on review aggregator website Rotten Tomatoes, based on 10 reviews, and an average rating of 5/10.Metacritic assigned the film a weighted average score of 46 out of 100, based on 12 critics, indicating "mixed or average reviews". In one critical review, Elizabeth Weitzman from the New York Daily News writes, "It's not an insult to say the black-and-white film looks like a grad-school thesis project, since that's what it is (for Franco's MFA at NYU). . .But that does mean you should be prepared for some high-minded pretension, lots of self-consciously arty shots, and long stretches of apparently profound nothingness." Although Weitzman is critical of Franco's writing and directing, she does compliment the film's cinematography and Franco's acting. In a review in The Village Voice, Melissa Anderson wrote that the film was "sincere, amateurish, and misguided" and that it was full of literary biopic cliches.

== See also ==
- The Broken Tower
- 2011 in film
