= Orrick Glenday Johns =

American poet

Orrick Glenday Johns (June 2, 1887 – July 8, 1946) was an American poet and playwright. He was one of the earliest modernist free-verse poets in Greenwich Village in 1913–1915 and associated with the artist's colony at Grantwood, New Jersey (sometimes referred to as Ridgefield), where Others: A Magazine of the New Verse was founded and published by Alfred Kreymborg in 1915. Johns's work "Olives", a series of fourteen small poems appeared in the first issue of July 1915. He is part of a coterie of poets and authors sometimes called the "Others" group who were contributors to the magazine or residents at the colony and included: William Carlos Williams, Wallace Stevens, Marianne Moore, Mina Loy, Ezra Pound, Conrad Aiken, Carl Sandburg, T. S. Eliot, Amy Lowell, H.D., Djuna Barnes, Man Ray, Skipwith Cannell, Lola Ridge, Marcel Duchamp, and Fenton Johnson (the only African American published in the magazine). Johns is also associated with poets like Vachel Lindsay and Sara Teasdale and the dramatist Zoe Akins.

== Early life ==
Johns was born in St. Louis, Missouri, to George Sibley Johns and Minnehaha McDearmon. George Sibley Johns was the editor of the St. Louis Post Dispatch. George and Minnehaha had six sons. They moved around St. Louis a lot before they settled into a house on Cabanne Place when Orrick was six years old. He lost a leg in a streetcar accident one year later. After the accident, Johns's family had to give up their home on Cabanne Place and move across the tracks to Maple avenue. Johns spent six months in bed recovering from the amputation and spent his time reading and developing a love of writing and publishing. The trolley company was deemed liable for the accident and the family was awarded a small sum. The accident spurred George Sibley Johns as one of Joseph Pulitzer's "Fighting Editors" to start a newspaper campaign to have the trolleys install better brakes and put fenders on the cars.

Johns was educated locally at public schools, including Dozier School, Central High School, and the University of Missouri. After graduating Johns held several jobs and eventually landed at Reedy's Mirror as a drama critic by William Marion Reedy. This position gave him his first experience writing professionally.

== Career ==
Johns first gained a national reputation as a poet in 1912. His poem, "Second Avenue", won The Lyric Year poetry contest, despite competing against Edna St. Vincent Millay's later famed "Renascence". The backer of the contest, Ferdinand P. Earle, chose Millay as the winner. Earle sent a letter informing Millay of her win before consulting with the other judges, who had previously and separately agreed on criteria for a winner to winnow down the massive flood of entrants. According to the remaining judges, the winning poem had to exhibit social relevance, which "Renascence" did not. Johns's "Second Avenue" was about the "squalid scenes" Johns saw on Eldridge Street and lower Second Avenue on the Lower East Side when he was in New York. It coalesced after seeing a speech by anarchist Emma Goldman on New Year's Eve 1912. The judges had already awarded Johns the win for this reason, and Millay placed fourth. Controversy ensued and played out in newspaper columns and editorial pages and made both Millay and Johns widely known. Johns received hate mail and made clear he felt her poem was the better one and avoided the awards banquet in his honor. Between 1913 and 1915, Johns lived in Greenwich Village in New York City. He then moved back to St. Louis for three years, where he wrote some of his best works. In his Greenwich Village days, he was known as one of the Lyrical Left—more bohemian than doctrinaire—and did not fully commit to Left politics until he joined the Communist Party briefly in the early 1930s.

Johns published three volumes of poetry, Black Branches, Asphalt and Wild Plum in the Teens and early 1920s. He wrote a novel, Blindfold, and a very successful play, A Charming Conscience, which provided him with enough money to reside in Italy for three years. Johns returned to the United States in 1929 and moved to Carmel, California, where he married his third wife. In Carmel, Johns became involved with union organizing and also wrote for Communist newspapers. Johns was an editor of the New Masses.

From 1935 to 1937, Johns was the supervisor of the WPA Writers' Project in New York City. His leftist politics drew negative attention in the media and occasional death threats. He resigned from the WPA project in 1937 and published Time of Our Lives: The Story of My Father and Myself, a work that is part autobiography and part biography of his father, George Sibley Johns, who was editor of the St. Louis Post-Dispatch and ran the paper after its owner Joseph Pulitzer went to New York to establish the New York World.

In 1938, Johns moved to Connecticut with his fourth wife, Doria Berton, and continued to write articles and short stories.

== Personal life ==
His first wife was Margarite Frances Baird, also known as Peggy Baird and Peggy Cowley from her second marriage to Malcolm Cowley. Johns was married to Grace Wilson from 1917 to 1926. His third wife was Caroline Blackman (1929–1936) who bore him a daughter named Charis in 1931, and subsequently was institutionalized for mental illness. She starved herself to death in a sanitarium. His fourth wife was Doria Berton (1937–1946) who bore him a daughter named Deborah.

Orrick Johns died by suicide by poisoning himself in Danbury, Connecticut. on July 8, 1946.

He is mentioned in Kenneth Rexroth's poem "Thou Shalt Not Kill" as "hopping into the surf on his one leg".

== Bibliography ==
- 1917 – Asphalt and Other Poems
- 1920 – Black Branches, A Book of Poetry and Plays
- 1923 – A Charming Conscience, a play
- 1925 – Blindfold, a novel
- 1926 – Wild Plum: Lyrics, with Sonnets to Charis
- 1937 – Time of Our Lives: The Story of My Father and Myself, autobiography
