= John Gery =

American poet, critic, and editor

- Born: June 2, 1953 (age 73); Reading, Pennsylvania, U.S.
- Education: Princeton University (B.A.); University of Chicago (M.A.); Stanford University (M.A.)
- Occupations: Professor, poet, critic, collaborative translator, editor
- Writing career
- Notable awards: Creative Writing Fellowship from the National Endowment for the Arts and the Louisiana Division of Arts (1992-1993); Research Fellowship at the Faculty of Philology, University of Belgrade in Serbia (2007); Fulbright Lecturer (2007); Seraphia D. Leyda Teaching Fellowship (2009-2012)
- Website: www.johngery.com

John Gery (born John Roy Octavius Dougherty; June 2, 1953) is an American poet, critic, collaborative translator, and editor. He has published seven books of poetry, a critical work on the treatment of nuclear annihilation in American poetry, two co-edited volumes of literary criticism and two co-edited anthologies of contemporary poetry, as well as, a co-authored biography and guidebook on Ezra Pound's Venice.

== Early life and education ==
Born in Reading, Pennsylvania, Gery is the son and fourth child of Malcolm R. Dougherty (1922–1960), a U.S. diplomat and businessman of Scotch-Irish and German descent, and Eugenie Gunesh Gery (maiden name, Guran, 1926- ), a homemaker and educator of Turkish and Russian descent. After his parents’ divorce and mother's marriage to Addison H. Gery, Jr. (1923–85), a jazz musician and business executive, Gery spent his youth in the small Moravian and Pennsylvania Dutch community of Lititz, Pennsylvania. At age eight, he was legally adopted by his stepfather and had his last name changed. He attended local schools through the tenth grade, demonstrating early a propensity for writing, music and acting. For two years he attended the Lawrenceville School in New Jersey where he received his high school diploma. He received a bachelor's degree from Princeton University with Honors in English (1975), a Master's in English from the University of Chicago (1976), and a Master's in Creative Writing from Stanford University (1978). At Princeton, he studied with poets as diverse as Mark Strand, John Peck, George Garrett, and Theodore Weiss, and at Chicago he studied with Robert von Hallberg and Richard Stern. But perhaps his most influential poetry teacher was Donald Davie at Stanford, where he also worked with Kenneth Fields, Albert Gelpi, N. Scott Momaday, Diane Middlebrook and others.

== Writing career ==
=== Poetry ===
Gery's poetry is heavily influenced not only by Pound, but by the avant-garde work of John Ashbery and his predecessors Gertrude Stein and Laura Riding. But he is equally engaged in the crafted technique of the Expansive Poetry Movement, and his work has sometimes been associated with the "New Formalist" movement, tracing its lineage from Richard Wilbur back through Thomas Hardy to Catullus and Sappho.

Writing about The Enemies of Leisure (1995) in Louisiana Literature, Alan Golding comments that "the scope and delicacy" of Gery's work "in Ashberry's words, 'takes in the whole world, now, but lightly /Still lightly, but with wide authority and tact." Stephen Behrendt describes Davenport's Version (2003), a book-length narrative poem set during the Union occupation of Civil War New Orleans that portrays "a triangular relationship that melds passion, deception, and betrayal in ways that parallel the tragic and internecine war" itself, as "a remarkable feat of poetic and psychological sleight of hand." "The voice assigned to Davenport," the poem's narrator, observes Behrendt, "is the sort of wise, universalized voice one associates with the narrators of epic works ranging from Homer to Whitman and Crane." About Gery's collection, A Gallery of Ghosts(2008), Susan Larson notes, "Gery's distinctive poetic voice lends seemingly orderly poems an ironic sharpness that cuts close to the bone. These poems convey both the bliss and pain of our existence, never shying away from life's uncomfortable truths." Most recently, in a review of Gery's Have at You Now! (2014), a collection he calls "multiple and wide-ranging," Daniel Wallace writes how "Gery troubles his readers with doubts, failings, and deeply grounded despair" but in verse that "is in turn whimsical, comic, erotic, and nostalgic." And Amy Tercek in Poet Lore observes, "The connection between Hamlet and Have at You Now! is most obvious in poems that examine the conflict between the activist's urge to fight and the artist's need to give form to experience" in what she calls a "beautifully staged collection."

Gery's poetry has appeared in Gulf Coast Review, The Iowa Review, New Orleans Review, New South, Paris Review, Poet Lore, Prairie Schooner, West Branch and many other journals, including translations into seven languages.

=== Critical and edited works ===
In addition to his monograph, Nuclear Annihilation and Contemporary American Poetry: Ways of Nothingness, Gery has published critical essays on contemporary poets ranging from Ashbery, Wilbur, Gwendolyn Brooks, James Merrill, and Adrienne Rich to Amiri Baraka, Lorenzo Thomas, and Marilyn Chin. In Michigan Quarterly Review, Laurence Goldstein says that “Educators in all fields should become better acquainted with the range of texts surveyed in Gery's book, because all the articulate wisdom in the world will be barely enough to avert the danger these poems stare at without blinking.” Most often, Gery considers the poetry he explores for its articulation of ideological, ethnic, sexual, or racial identity. But although, among the modernists, he has also written on Stein, William Carlos Williams, H.D., and Davie, his most sustained criticism has been on Pound, often discussing Pound's association with Venice in The Cantos and other poems or providing close interpretations of individual texts. In addition to co-editing two volumes of critical essays on Pound, he has co-authored In Venice and Veneto with Ezra Pound, a biographical and literary guide, with Rosella Mamoli Zorzi, Massimo Bacigalupo, and Stefano Maria Casella, and has collaborated with Vahe Baladouni on a biography of an Armenian poet of the early twentieth century in Hmayeak Shems: A Poet of Pure Spirit.

=== Collaborative translations ===
Gery has collaborated on translations, including from Armenian (with Vahe Baladouni), Serbian (with Biljana D. Obradović), Chinese (with Xiaobin Yang and Guiming Wang), Italian (with Caterina Ricciardi and Massimo Bacigalupo), and French (with Ivan Zaknic).

== Academic career ==
Gery began his academic career lecturing at Stanford and San Jose State Universities for two years respectfully before joining the University of New Orleans (UNO) as an instructor in 1979. In 1999, he became a research professor of English at UNO. In 1990 Gery also became founding director of the Ezra Pound Center for Literature. He has served as secretary of the Ezra Pound International Conference since 2005 and as series editor of the EPCL Book Series at UNO Press since 2008.

In 2006, Gery was a visiting research fellow at the Institute for Advanced Study, University of Minnesota. In the same year he was also the Annadora Gregory Lecturer at Doane College, Nebraska. Gery has also taught at the University of Iowa (1991, 1993) and has been a summer poet-in-residence at Bucknell University. He has also lectured at the Centro Studi Americani (Rome), Ca' Foscari University of Venice, Beijing Institute of Technology, University of Roma Tre, and University of Salamanca.

== Personal life ==
Gery is married to the poet Biljana Obradović (1961- ). They have a son, Petar Malcolm Obradović Gery (2003- ).

== Published works ==
- Charlemagne: A Song of Gestures (poetry), Plumbers Ink Books (Cerrillos, NM), 1983. ISBN 9780935684063
- The Burning of New Orleans (long poem), Amelia Press (Bakersfield, CA), 1988.
- Three Poems (chapbook), Lestat Press (West Chester, PA), 1989.
- The Enemies of Leisure (poetry; includes Three Poems), Story Line Press (Brownsville, OR), 1995. ISBN 1885266014
- Nuclear Annihilation and Contemporary American Poetry: Ways of Nothingness (literary and cultural criticism), University Press of Florida (Gainesville), 1996. ISBN 0813014174
- (Translator with Vahe Baladouni) For the House of Torkom, by Hmayyag Shems, Cross-Cultural Communications (Merrick, NY), 1999. ISBN 0893044601
- Davenport's Version: A Narrative Poem, Portals Press (New Orleans, LA), 2003. ISBN 9780916620585
- A Gallery of Ghosts: Poems, Storyline Press (Ashland, OR), 2005. ISBN 9781586540456
- Have At You Now!, CW Books (Cincinnati, OH), 2014. ISBN 9781625490704
- In Place of Love and Country (editor), The Crater Press (London), 2013. ISBN 978-1907570513
- I Poeti della Sala Capizucchi: The Poets of the Sala Capizucchi (editor) (The Ezra Pound Center for Literature), UNO Press (New Orleans, LA), 2011. ISBN 9781608010684
- Imagism (editor), UNO Press (New Orleans, LA), 2013. ISBN 9781608011131
- Ezra Pound, Ends and Beginnings: Essays and Poems from the Ezra Pound International Conference (editor), AMS Press (Venice), 2007. ISBN 9780404655303
- In Venice with Ezra Pound, Supernova (Venice), 2007. ISBN 9788888548791

== Awards ==
In 1992–1993, Gery received a creative writing fellowship from the National Endowment for the Arts and from the Louisiana Division of Arts. In 2007, he was awarded a Fulbright Lecturer and research fellowship at the Faculty of Philology, University of Belgrade in Serbia. At UNO he was awarded the Seraphia D. Leyda Teaching Fellowship for 2009-2012.

== Book awards ==
- Charlemagne: A Song of Gestures (1983, Plumbers Ink Poetry Award)
- The Enemies of Leisure (1995, “Best Book of 1995” award, Publishers Weekly; Critic's Choice Award, San Francisco Review of Books)
- American Ghost: Selected Poems, translated into Serbian by Biljana Obradović (1999, European Award, Circle Franz Kafka, Prague)
- Davenport's Version (2003, a narrative poem of the Civil War)
- A Gallery of Ghosts (2008, nominated for a Pulitzer Prize)
- Lure (2012, translated into Serbian by Svetlana Nedeljkov)
- Have at You Now! (2014, nominated for a Pushcart Prize)
