= Love Is Not All: It Is Not Meat nor Drink =

1931 poem by Edna St. Vincent Millay

Love Is Not All: It Is Not Meat nor Drink is a 1931 poem by Edna St. Vincent Millay, written during the Great Depression.

The poem was included in her collection Fatal Interview, a sequence of 52 sonnets, appearing alongside other sonnets such as "I dreamed I moved among the Elysian fields," and "Love me no more, now let the god depart," rejoicing in romantic language and vulnerability. These sonnets depict the love affair from a woman's perspective which chronicles her first attraction, consummation, and sorrow at breaking up. Many of the poems make generous use of imagery in Renaissance love sonnets, and uses a medieval setting in some to complement these references.

The rhyme scheme in Love Is Not All follows that of a Shakespearean sonnet, however, the division of lines indicate a Petrarchan sonnet. It strays away from the extravagant prose of her other poems and instead adopts a more simplistic word choice. The poem begins with an octave where the speaker states that love does not possess the power to heal or save things, and concludes with a sestet of the speaker saying that even though she may face hardships, she would not trade love for food or peace.

This poem is often lauded as one of her most successful works in the Fatal Interview sequence.

== Background ==
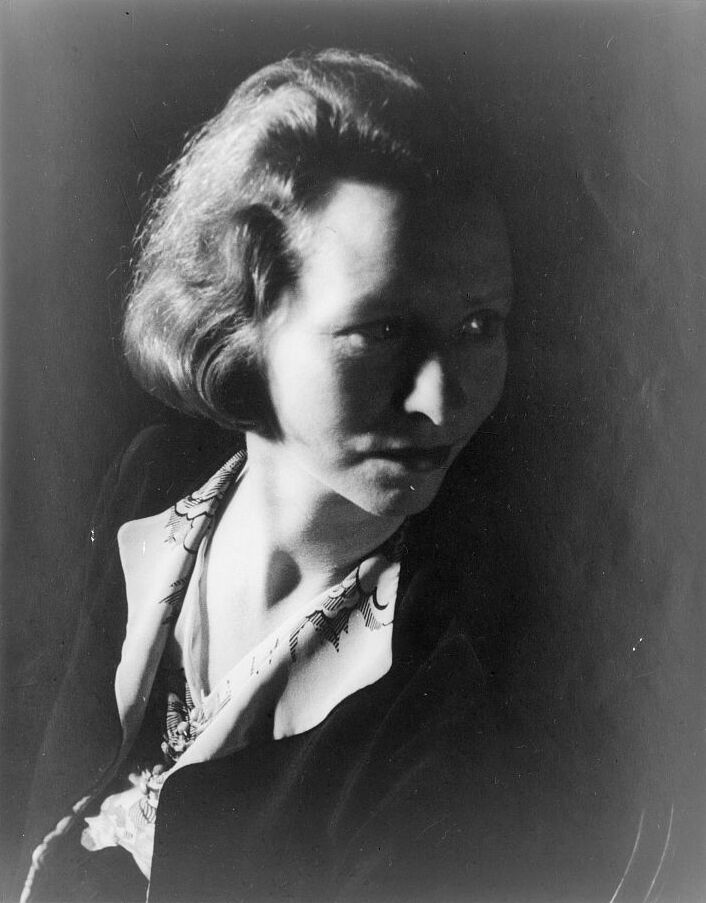
Edna St. Vincent Millay

Millay married Eugen Boissevain in 1923; however, in 1928 she met George Dillon, the man whom Fatal Interview was written about. Millay took inspiration from the ancient Greek myth of Selene and Endymion, and mirrored their relationship in her sonnets.

The title 'Fatal Interview' is a reference to Donne's "Elegy 16", and Love Is Not All is a direct response to this elegy, which claims that beauty will not calm the oceans and love will not tame beasts. Millay acknowledges these facts with her own listing of things that love is powerless against, yet disagrees with Donne's personal philosophies and states that while some events might not be moved by love, she would not stop loving even if it meant her life would be made easier.

== Structure ==
Love Is Not All: It Is Not Meat nor Drink is the thirtieth in the sequence Fatal Interview and is the last to sing of Millay and Dillon's nightly visits before transitioning into the slow decline of their romantic relationship. It maintains iambic pentameter aside from a few exceptions within the lines, such as line eight where the line becomes catalectic trochaic hexameter. This line marks the shift from the poem's octave to its sestet, as well as the shift in tone of the sonnet.

The sonnet has three quatrains and a couplet if divided by the rhyme scheme rather than subject, and follows the regular Shakespearean sonnet rhyming pattern of ABAB CDCD EFEF GG.

== Critical response ==
After the release of Millay's Fatal Interview, some reviewers wrote that during a time of serious economic depression, there was no place for love poems. Others wrote that a sequence of love sonnets in the twentieth century was boring and clichéd.

Harriet Monroe wrote in Poetry that Millay writing a book of love poems was a waste of her earlier potential and claimed that she had squandered the equal footing among men she gained for herself with Renascence. Monroe felt that Millay should push to produce more masculine works to gain respect and renown in the poetry community. She also wrote that Millay's Fatal Interview was among the finest collections of love poems in history.

A review by Genevieve Taggard praised Millay for her skill with the sonnet but criticized her for her obsession with perfection, which Taggard claimed had made Millay uninterested in real people.

However, both Harriet Monroe in Poetry and Allen Tate in New Republic claimed that Millay had mastered the art and form of the Shakespearean sonnet in a way no one had since Shakespeare himself.

While Tate began his review with praise, he ended it by saying she was "not an intellect, but a sensibility", and that her sequence was of little importance as he negatively compared her to T. S. Eliot and Yeats.

L. Robert Lind wrote a response sonnet in the Sewanee Review to Millay's sequence where he claimed that if she were truly mourning the loss of a relationship, she should do so as a woman should and be silent.

Patricia A. Klemens praises Millay's collection of sonnets as traditional for its form and images yet simultaneously nontraditional for reversing the point-of-view of the love sonnet from a man's perspective to a woman's. Klemens stated that claiming the role of a woman in an area which had so long been dominated by men was revolutionary for the time period.

Winfield Townley Scott said Love Is Not All may be one of Millay's best works, deviating from textbook poems and realizing an originality specific to Millay.
