= Samuel Greenberg =

American poet

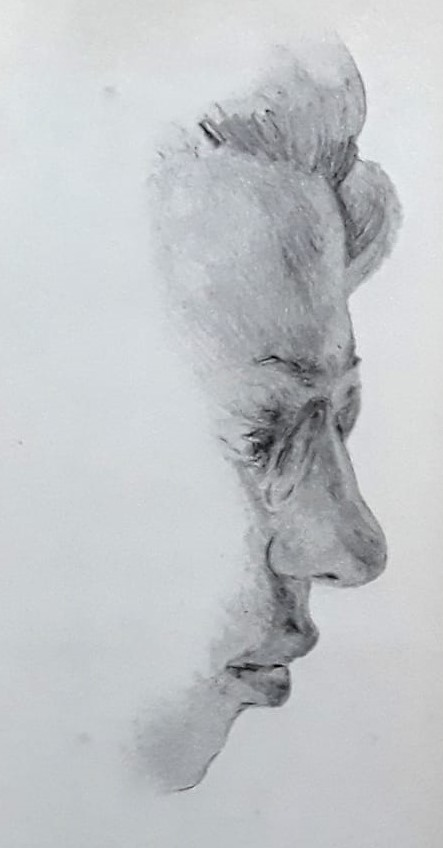
- Born: December 13, 1893; New York City, US
- Died: August 16, 1917 (aged 23); New York City, US
- Occupations: Artist and Poet

Samuel Bernard Greenberg (December 13, 1893 – August 16, 1917) was an Austrian-American Jewish poet and artist. Greenberg grew up in poverty on the Lower East Side of New York City and spent the last years of his life in and out of charity hospitals. He died of tuberculosis in the Manhattan State Hospital on Wards Island. Marc Simon writes, "Jacob and Hannah Greenberg, before coming to the new world, had lived with their family in Vienna. They had eight children; the sixth named Samuel was born in Vienna in 1893. His father supported the large family by embroidering gold and silver brocades for religious and other purposes . . . Greenberg attended public school 160 on Suffix Street at the corner of Rivington, on the Lower East Side of Manhattan."

The fullest collection of his poems is Poems by Samuel Greenberg, ed. Harold Holden and Jack McManis, New York: Henry Holt and Company, 1947.

The critical attention Greenberg has received began when the critic William Murrell Fisher (1889–1969) first showed Hart Crane 11 Greenberg poems he had published in a journal called The Ploughshare in Woodstock, NY, as well as several notebooks full of poems Greenberg's brother Morris had left him. Crane retyped 41 poems on 32 pages on yellow foolscap and brought the manuscript back to New York with him on the train on January 2, 1924. Crane created a poem of his own called "Emblems of Conduct" from phrases of a poem by Greenberg called "Conduct," interspersed with lines of his own. The poem was published in Crane's first collection, White Buildings, to attract attention to Greenberg. Crane was dubious about including it, but Malcolm Cowley and Allen Tate urged him to use the poem.

Other critics, however, have charged Crane with being disingenuous and having actually plagiarized Greenberg's work.

== Bibliography ==
Posthumously published editions

Poems from the Greenberg Manuscripts: A Selection from the Work of Samuel B. Greenberg, James Laughlin, ed. Norfolk: New Directions, 1939.

Poems by Samuel Greenberg: A Selection from the Manuscripts, Harold Holden and Jack McManis, eds. New York: Henry Holt and Company, 1947.

Poems from the Greenberg manuscript: a selection of the poems of Samuel Bernard Greenberg, the unknown poet who influenced Hart Crane; edited, with biographical notes, by James Laughlin; New, expanded edition, edited by Garrett Caples, New York: New Directions Publishing, 2019, ISBN 978-0-8112-2813-8

Samuel Greenberg, Hart Crane, and the Lost Manuscripts, Marc Simon. Atlantic Highlands, NJ: Humanities Press, 1978, ISBN 0-391-00558-8. (Critical study with an appendix that prints Crane's typescript of forty-one poems by Greenberg.)

Self Charm: Selected Sonnets & Other Poems, Michael Carr and Michael Smith, eds. Cambridge, MA: Katalanche Press, 2005.
