= Hart Crane =

American poet (1899–1932)

- Crane photographed by Walker Evans, c. 1929–1930
- Born: Harold Hart Crane; July 21, 1899; Garrettsville, Ohio, U.S.
- Died: April 27, 1932 (aged 32); Atlantic Ocean, east of Palm Beach, FL
- Occupation: Poet
- Writing career
- Period: 1916–1932
- Notable work: The Bridge

Harold Hart Crane (July 21, 1899 – April 27, 1932) was an American poet. Inspired by the Romantics and his fellow Modernists, Crane wrote highly stylized poetry, often noted for its complexity. His collection White Buildings (1926), featuring "Chaplinesque", "At Melville's Tomb", "Repose of Rivers" and "Voyages", helped to cement his place in the avant-garde literary scene of the time. The long poem The Bridge (1930) is an epic inspired by the Brooklyn Bridge.

Crane was born in Garrettsville, Ohio, to Clarence A. Crane and Grace Edna Hart. He dropped out of East High School in Cleveland during his junior year and left for New York City, promising his parents he would later attend Columbia University. Crane took various jobs, including in copywriting and advertising. Throughout the early 1920s, various small but well-respected literary magazines published some of Crane's poems, gaining him among the avant-garde a respect that White Buildings ratified and strengthened. His ambition to synthesize America was expressed in The Bridge, intended to be an uplifting counter to T. S. Eliot's The Waste Land (1922). Initial critical reaction to it was mixed, with many praising the scope but criticizing the quality of the poems. On April 27, 1932, Crane, in an inebriated state, jumped off the steamship USS Orizaba and into the Atlantic Ocean while the ship was en route from Veracruz to New York via Havana, Cuba. He left no suicide note, but witnesses to his jump believed he was intentionally killing himself. Throughout his life, he had multiple homosexual relations, many of which were described in, or otherwise influenced, his poetry. He had one known female partner, Peggy Cowley, around a year before his death.

Contemporary opinion of Crane's work was mixed, with poets including Marianne Moore and Wallace Stevens criticizing his work, and others, including William Carlos Williams and E. E. Cummings, praising it. William Rose Benét wrote that, with The Bridge, Crane "failed in creating what might have been a truly great poem" but that it "reveals potencies in the author that may make his next work even more remarkable". His last work, "The Broken Tower" (1932), was unfinished and published posthumously. Crane has been praised by several playwrights, poets, and literary critics, including Robert Lowell, Derek Walcott, Tennessee Williams, and Harold Bloom; Bloom called him "a High Romantic in the era of High Modernism". Allen Tate called Crane "one of those men whom every age seems to select as the spokesman of its spiritual life; they give the age away."

== Life ==
=== Early life ===
Crane was born in Garrettsville, Ohio, on July 21, 1899 to Clarence A. Crane and Grace Edna Hart. His father was a successful Ohio restaurateur and businessman who invented the Life Savers candy and held the patent, but sold it for $2,900 before the brand became popular. He made other candy and accumulated a fortune from the business with chocolate bars. Clarence Crane's sister, Alice Crane Williams, was a composer and literary editor. His aunt Zell Hart Deming gave funds to her nephew to support his early career.

In 1894, the family moved to Warren, Ohio where his father opened a maple syrup company, which he sold in 1908 to Corn Products Refining Company. In April 1911, his father opened a chocolate manufacturing and retailing company, the Crane Chocolate Company. The family moved to Cleveland in 1911, into a house at 1709 East 115th Street. In 1913, Clarence Crane's parents purchased the residence across the street.

Hart Crane began attending East High School around 1913–1914. (Note: Thomas S. W. Lewis, in a 1969 piece for Salmagundi, states he began attending East High School in 1914. The Oxford Research Encyclopedia entry on Hart Crane states he was enrolled in 1913.)

=== Career ===
He has woven rose-vines
About the empty heart of night,
And vented his long mellowed wines
Of dreaming on the desert white
With searing sophistry.
And he tented with far truths he would form
The transient bosoms from the thorny tree.

O Materna! to enrich thy gold head
And wavering shoulders with a new light shed

From penitence, must needs bring pain,
And with it song of minor, broken strain.
But you who hear the lamp whisper thru night
Can trace paths tear-wet, and forget all blight.

— Hart Crane's "C33" as published in Bruno's Weekly in 1917.

Crane's first published work was the poem "C33", which was published in the Greenwich journal Bruno's Weekly in 1917 in a feature entitled "Oscar Wilde: Poems in His Praise". The poem is named after Oscar Wilde's cell in The Ballad of Reading Gaol and his name appeared misspelled in print as "Harold H Crone". The style he would use in his later books is apparent in poems written at the time. Crane dropped out of East High School in Cleveland during his junior year in December 1916 and left for New York City, promising his parents he would later attend Columbia University. His parents, in the middle of divorce proceedings, were upset. Crane took various copywriting jobs and moved between friends' apartments in Manhattan. For a period, he rented a room at 25 East 11th Street from a motion-picture scriptwriter named Mrs. Walton, who encouraged his writing. Crane's mother and father were constantly fighting, and they divorced on April 14, 1917. (Note: Page 35 of Paul Mariani's The Broken Tower: The Life of Hart Crane states that the divorce was expected to conclude on April 1.) The same year, he attempted to enlist in the military, but was rejected due to being a minor.

He worked in a munitions plant until the end of World War I. Between 1917 and 1924, he moved back and forth between New York and Cleveland, working as an advertising copywriter and a worker in his father's factory. In 1925, he briefly lived with Caroline Gordon and Allen Tate. The two had a dispute with Crane due to the mess his belongings made throughout the house. Additionally, Crane and Tate had a disagreement over the negative outlook of T. S. Eliot's work. This prompted them to leave two letters under his door requesting that he move out, which he did. He wrote his mother and grandmother in the spring of 1924:

Just imagine looking out your window directly on the East River with nothing intervening between your view of the Statue of Liberty, way down the harbour, and the marvelous beauty of Brooklyn Bridge close above you on your right! All of the great new skyscrapers of lower Manhattan are marshaled directly across from you, and there is a constant stream of tugs, liners, sail boats, etc in procession before you on the river! It's really a magnificent place to live. This section of Brooklyn is very old, but all the houses are in splendid condition and have not been invaded by foreigners...

Based on Crane's letters, New York was where he felt most at home. Additionally, much of his poetry takes place there.

==== White Buildings (1926) ====
Throughout the early 1920s, many small but well-respected literary magazines published some of Crane's poems, gaining him respect among the avant-garde which was later cemented by the 1926 publication of White Buildings. On May 1, 1926, he went to Isla de la Juventud to reside in his mother's family residence there. He received a contract from Liveright Publishing to publish White Buildings in July. White Buildings contains many of Crane's most well-received and popular poems, including "For the Marriage of Faustus and Helen", and "Voyages", a sequence of erotic poems. They were written while he was falling in love with Emil Opffer, a Danish merchant mariner, whom "Voyages" is generally considered to be about. "Faustus and Helen" was part of a larger artistic struggle to meet modernity with something more than despair. Crane identified T. S. Eliot with that kind of despair, and while he acknowledged the greatness of The Waste Land, he also said it was "so damned dead", an impasse, and characterized by a refusal to see "certain spiritual events and possibilities". Crane's self-appointed work would be to bring those spiritual events and possibilities to poetic life, and so create "a mystical synthesis of America". Edmund Wilson said Crane had "a style that is strikingly original—almost something like a great style, if there could be such a thing as a great style which was ... not ... applied to any subject at all."

Crane returned to New York in 1928 following a hurricane which left the Cuban residence damaged, and began living with friends and taking temporary jobs as a copywriter, or living off unemployment and the charity of friends and his father. For a time he lived in Brooklyn at 77 Willow Street until his lover, Opffer, invited him to live in Opffer's father's home at 110 Columbia Heights in Brooklyn Heights. Crane was overjoyed at the views the location afforded him.

==== The Bridge (1930) ====
The first known mention of The Bridge was in a 1923 letter to Gorham Munson in which he wrote:

I am ruminating on a new longish poem under the title of The Bridge which carries on further the tendencies manifest in 'F and H.' It will be exceedingly difficult to accomplish it as I see it now, so much time will be wasted in thinking about it.

Crane moved to Paterson, New Jersey, in 1927. In 1928, he worked as a secretary for a stockbroker visiting California. Crane's mother, following her second marriage breakup, was living in the Los Angeles area. He revealed his homosexuality to her, causing a confrontation. Crane sneaked out on May 15, 1928, never to see her again. He later found out about the death of his grandmother, Elizabeth Hart, but his mother refused to pay him his $5,000 inheritance until he would return to live with her. He managed to convince her to send him the money and left for Europe towards late November intending to live in Mallorca, but instead went first to London then to Paris. In Paris in February 1929, Harry Crosby, who with his wife Caresse Crosby owned the fine arts press Black Sun Press, offered Crane the use of their country retreat, Le Moulin du Soleil in Ermenonville. They hoped he could use the time to concentrate on completing The Bridge. Crane spent several weeks at their estate where he wrote a draft of the "Cape Hatteras" section, a key part of his panegyric poem. In late June that year, Crane returned from the south of France to Paris. Crosby noted in his journal, "Hart C. back from Marseilles where he slept with his thirty sailors and he began again to drink Cutty Sark." Crane got drunk at the Cafe Select and fought with waiters over his tab. When the Paris police were called, he fought with them and was beaten. They arrested and jailed him, fining him 800 francs. After Hart had spent six days in prison at La Santé, Crosby paid Crane's fine and advanced him money for the passage back to the United States, where he finished The Bridge. In January 1930, the work was published by Black Sun Press in Paris and subsequently by Boni & Liveright in the United States in April. The work received poor reviews, and Crane struggled with a sense of failure.

His ambition to synthesize America was expressed in The Bridge, intended to be an uplifting counter to Eliot's The Waste Land. The Brooklyn Bridge is both the poem's central symbol and its poetic starting point. Crane found a place to start his synthesis in Brooklyn. Arts patron Otto H. Kahn gifted him $2,000 to begin work on the panegyric poem, though he had requested a loan of $1,000. After parting with the Opffers, Crane left for Paris in early 1929, but continued to struggle with his mental health. His drinking had become worse during the late 1920s, while he was finishing The Bridge.

==== "The Broken Tower" (1932) ====
He visited his father, who had started an inn in the vicinity of Chagrin Falls, Ohio, in 1931. Crane visited Mexico in 1931–32 on a Guggenheim Fellowship, and his drinking continued as he suffered from bouts of alternating depression and elation. When Peggy Cowley, wife of his friend Malcolm Cowley, agreed to a divorce, she joined Crane. The two began a romantic relationship on December 25, 1931. As far as is known, she was his only heterosexual partner. "The Broken Tower", one of his last published poems, emerged from that affair. Crane still felt himself a failure, in part because he recommenced homosexual activities despite his relationship with Cowley. He claimed multiple times he would commit suicide.

Crane intended "The Broken Tower" to be "an epic of the modern consciousness." In keeping with the varieties and difficulties of Crane criticism, the poem has been interpreted widely—as a death ode, life ode, process poem, visionary poem, and a poem on failed vision—but its biographical impetus out of Crane's only heterosexual affair is generally undisputed. Written early in the year and finished two months prior to his death, the poem was rejected by Poetry Magazine, and only appeared in print (in the June 1932 New Republic) after Crane's death.

=== Death ===
Crane and Peggy decided to return to New York on the steamship Orizaba in April 1932 because Crane's stepmother had invited him back to settle the estate of his father, who had died the month prior. This was the same ship aboard which he had gone to Cuba in 1926. The Orizaba departed from Veracruz, Mexico, on April 23 and stopped at Havana, Cuba on April 26. While aboard, Crane was assaulted after making sexual advances to a male crew member.

Just before noon on April 27, 1932, Crane jumped into the Atlantic Ocean. (Note: Clive Fisher's biography of Crane, Hart Crane: A Life, mistakenly states he jumped into the Caribbean.) Although he had been drinking heavily and left no suicide note, witnesses believed his intentions to be suicidal, as several reported that he exclaimed "Goodbye, everybody!" before jumping overboard. The ship was about 300 miles (500 km) from Cuba. An article the following day in The New York Times linked his death to his father's. His body was never recovered. A marker on his father's tombstone at Park Cemetery outside Garrettsville, Ohio includes the inscription, "Harold Hart Crane 1899–1932 lost at sea."

== Writing ==
=== Influences ===
Crane was heavily influenced by T. S. Eliot, in particular The Waste Land. The Bridge was intended to be a more optimistic view of society than that of The Waste Land. He first read The Waste Land in the November 1922 edition of The Dial.

Walt Whitman, William Blake, Ralph Waldo Emerson, and Emily Dickinson were also particularly influential to Crane. As a teenager, Crane also read Plato, Honoré de Balzac, and Percy Bysshe Shelley.

=== Criticism ===
Crane's critical effort is mostly to be found in his letters: he corresponded regularly with Allen Tate, Yvor Winters, and Gorham Munson, and shared critical dialogues with Eugene O'Neill, William Carlos Williams, E. E. Cummings, Sherwood Anderson, Kenneth Burke, Waldo Frank, Harriet Monroe, Marianne Moore, and Gertrude Stein. He was also an acquaintance of H. P. Lovecraft, who would eventually voice concern over Crane's premature aging due to alcohol abuse. Selections of Crane's letters are available in many editions of his poetry. His two most famous stylistic defenses emerged from correspondences: his "General Aims and Theories" (1925) was written to urge Eugene O'Neill's critical foreword to White Buildings, then passed around among friends, yet unpublished during Crane's life; and the famous "Letter to Harriet Monroe" (1926) was part of an exchange for the publication of "At Melville's Tomb" in Poetry.

==== "Logic of metaphor" ====
Crane's most quoted criticism is in the circulated, if long and unpublished, "General Aims and Theories": "As to technical considerations: the motivation of the poem must be derived from the implicit emotional dynamics of the materials used, and the terms of expression employed are often selected less for their logical (literal) significance than for their associational meanings. Via this and their metaphorical inter-relationships, the entire construction of the poem is raised on the organic principle of a 'logic of metaphor,' which antedates our so-called pure logic, and which is the genetic basis of all speech, hence consciousness and thought-extension."

There is also some mention of it, though it is not so much presented as a critical neologism, in his letter to Harriet Monroe: "The logic of metaphor is so organically entrenched in pure sensibility that it can't be thoroughly traced or explained outside of historical sciences, like philology and anthropology." L. S. Dembo's influential study of The Bridge, Hart Crane's Sanskrit Charge (1960), reads this 'logic' well within the familiar rhetoric of the Romantics: "The Logic of metaphor was simply the written form of the 'bright logic' of the imagination, the crucial sign stated, the Word made words.... As practiced, the logic of metaphor theory is reducible to a fairly simple linguistic principle: the symbolized meaning of an image takes precedence over its literal meaning; regardless of whether the vehicle of an image makes sense, the reader is expected to grasp its tenor."

=== Style ===
==== Difficulty ====
The willows carried a slow sound,
A sarabande the wind mowed on the mead.
I could never remember
That seething, steady leveling of the marshes
Till age had brought me to the sea.

— From "Repose of Rivers"
from White Buildings (1926)

The publication of White Buildings was delayed by Eugene O'Neill's struggle (and eventual failure) to articulate his appreciation in a foreword to it; and many critics since have used Crane's difficulty as an excuse for a quick dismissal. O'Neill did, however, write a draft for such a foreword. The text said of Crane that "the great difficulty which his poetry presents the reader, is naturally, the style. The theme never appears in explicit statement". The publisher Harcourt rejected White Buildings, with Harrison Smith writing Crane is "a genuine poet ... [but White Buildings] is really the most perplexing kind of poetry." A young Tennessee Williams, then falling in love with Crane's poetry, could "hardly understand a single line—of course the individual lines aren't supposed to be intelligible. The message, if there actually is one, comes from the total effect." Crane was aware that his poetry was difficult. Some of his essays originated as encouraging epistles, explications and stylistic apologies to editors, updates to his patron, and both well-considered or impulsive letters to friends. It was only his exchange with Harriet Monroe at Poetry, when she initially refused to print "At Melville's Tomb", that urged Crane to describe his "logic of metaphor" in print:

If the poet is to be held completely to the already evolved and exploited sequences of imagery and logic—what field of added consciousness and increased perceptions (the actual province of poetry, if not lullabies) can be expected when one has to relatively return to the alphabet every breath or two? In the minds of people who have sensitively read, seen, and experienced a great deal, isn't there a terminology something like short-hand as compared to usual description and dialectics, which the artist ought to be right in trusting as a reasonable connective agent toward fresh concepts, more inclusive evaluations?

Monroe was not impressed, though she acknowledged that others were, and printed the exchange alongside the poem:

You find me testing metaphors, and poetic concept in general, too much by logic, whereas I find you pushing logic to the limit in a painfully intellectual search for emotion, for poetic motive.

Crane had a relatively well-developed rhetoric for the defense of his poems; here is an excerpt from "General Aims and Theories":

New conditions of life germinate new forms of spiritual articulation. ...the voice of the present, if it is to be known, must be caught at the risk of speaking in idioms and circumlocutions sometimes shocking to the scholar and historians of logic.

==== "Homosexual text" ====
As a child, he had a sexual relationship with a man. (Note: "[That] Hart Crane was homosexual was by now well known to most of his friends. He said to Evans that he had been seduced as a boy by an older man.")

Criticism since the late 20th century has suggested reading Crane's poems—"The Broken Tower", "My Grandmother's Love Letters", the "Voyages" series, and others—with an eye to homosexual meanings in the text. Queer theorist Tim Dean argues that the obscurity of Crane's style owes partially to the necessities of being a semi-public homosexual—not quite closeted, but also, as legally and culturally necessary, not open: "The intensity responsible for Crane's particular form of difficulty involves not only linguistic considerations but also culturally subjective concerns. This intensity produces a kind of privacy that is comprehensible in terms of the cultural construction of homosexuality and its attendant institutions of privacy."

Thomas Yingling objects to the traditional, New Critical and Eliotic readings of Crane, arguing that the "American myth criticism and formalist readings" have "depolarized and normalized our reading of American poetry, making any homosexual readings seem perverse." Even more than a personal or political problem, though, Yingling argues that such "biases" obscure much of what the poems make clear; he cites, for instance, the last lines of "My Grandmother's Love Letters" from White Buildings as a haunting description of estrangement from the norms of (heterosexual) family life:

Yet I would lead my grandmother by the hand
Through much of what she would not understand;
And so I stumble. And the rain continues on the roof
With such a sound of gently pitying laughter.

Brian Reed has contributed to a project of critical reintegration of queer criticism with other critical methods, suggesting that an overemphasis on the sexual biography of Crane's poetry can skew a broader appreciation of his overall work. In one example of Reed's approach, he published a close reading of Crane's lyric poem, "Voyages", (a love poem that Crane wrote for his lover Emil Opffer) on the Poetry Foundation website, analyzing the poem based strictly on the content of the text itself and not on outside political or cultural matters.

=== Accusations of plagiarism ===
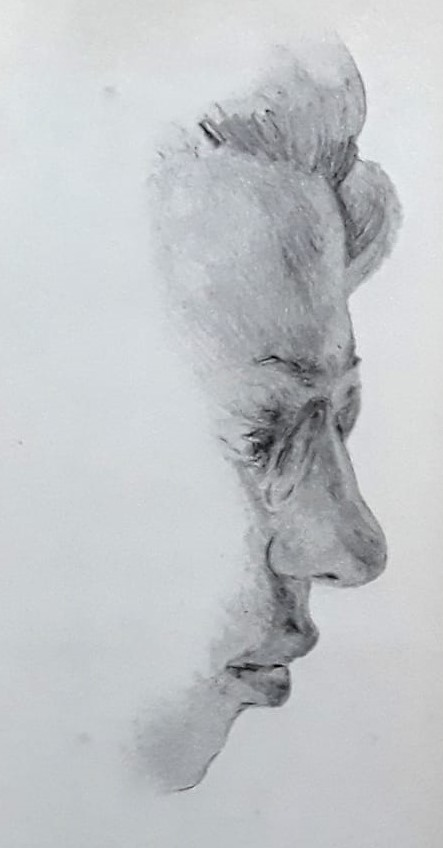
A 1916 self-portrait of Samuel Greenberg.

In mid-December 1926, Crane visited William Murrell Fisher in Woodstock, a literary critic whom he first met via their mutual friend Gorham Munson. There, Fisher shared with Crane multiple manuscripts of poems by Samuel Greenberg, a little-known poet who had died in 1917. Writing to Gorham Munson on December 20, Crane wrote, "This poet, Grünberg, [sic] which Fisher nursed until he died of consumption at a Jewish Hospital in New York was a Rimbaud in embryo ... Fisher has shown me an amazing amount of material, some of which I am copying and will show you when I get back." Morris Greenberg, Samuel's brother, had given five of Samuel's notebooks to Fisher so that they could be published. (Note: Philip Horton, in his 1937 biography of Hart Crane, Hart Crane: The Life of an American Poet, incorrectly states on page 160 that Fisher had "inherited the notebooks through the indifference of the boy's relatives".) Crane copied forty-two poems from the notebooks, which he borrowed from Fisher for a period of less than a month. (Note: Hart Crane: The Life of an American Poet claims Crane brought the notebooks with him when moving from Woodstock to New York in January 1927. This is because William Slater Brown remembered Crane had read some of the poems on the train ride home. Marc Simon later spoke to Fisher, who said Crane had certainly returned the notebooks before moving to New York. The poems Brown heard were read aloud from the manuscripts.) Many of Crane's poems consisted of lines and phrases taken from Greenberg's poems, always unattributed. Crane's poem "Emblems of Conduct", the third in White Buildings, consisted solely of rearranged lines from Greenberg's poems.

The plagiarism went unnoticed for decades until Marc Simon published Samuel Greenberg, Hart Crane and the Lost Manuscripts in 1978, detailing how Crane copied from Greenberg. Scholarly interpretation over the intent and morality of Hart Crane's actions varies. Writer and critic Samuel R. Delany argues Crane merely tried to draw attention to an unknown poet and wanted readers to experience for themselves the delight of realizing one of his influences without him telling them.

== Influence ==
=== Among contemporaries ===
Crane was admired by artists including Eugene O'Neill, Kenneth Burke, Edmund Wilson, E. E. Cummings, Tennessee Williams and William Carlos Williams. Although Crane had his sharp critics, among them Marianne Moore and Ezra Pound, Moore did publish his work, as did T. S. Eliot, who, moving even further out of Pound's sphere, may have borrowed some of Crane's imagery for Four Quartets, in the beginning of "East Coker", which is reminiscent of the final section of "The River", from The Bridge.

Yvor Winters and Allen Tate both praised White Buildings but considered The Bridge to be a failure.

=== Legacy ===
Mid-century American poets, such as John Berryman and Robert Lowell, cited Crane as a significant influence. Both poets also wrote about Crane in their poetry. Berryman wrote him one of his famous elegies in The Dream Songs, and Lowell published his "Words for Hart Crane" in Life Studies (1959): "Who asks for me, the Shelley of my age, / must lay his heart out for my bed and board." Lowell thought that Crane was the most important American poet of the generation to come of age in the 1920s, stating that "[Crane] got out more than anybody else ... he somehow got New York City; he was at the center of things in the way that no other poet was." Lowell also described Crane as being "less limited than any other poet of his generation."

Tennessee Williams said that he wanted to be "given back to the sea" at the "point most nearly determined as the point at which Hart Crane gave himself back". One of Williams's last plays, a "ghost play" titled Steps Must Be Gentle, explores Crane's relationship with his mother.

In a 1991 interview with Antonio Weiss of The Paris Review, the literary critic Harold Bloom talked about how Crane, along with William Blake, initially sparked his interest in literature at a very young age:

I was preadolescent, ten or eleven years old. I still remember the extraordinary delight, the extraordinary force that Crane and Blake brought to me—in particular Blake's rhetoric in the longer poems—though I had no notion what they were about. I picked up a copy of The Collected Poems of Hart Crane in the Bronx Library. I still remember when I lit upon the page with the extraordinary trope, "O Thou steeled Cognizance whose leap commits / The agile precincts of the lark's return." I was just swept away by it, by the Marlovian rhetoric. I still have the flavor of that book in me. Indeed it's the first book I ever owned. I begged my oldest sister to give it to me, and I still have the old black and gold edition she gave me for my birthday back in 1942 . . . I suppose the only poet of the twentieth century that I could secretly set above Yeats and Stevens would be Hart Crane.

Bloom also authored the introduction to the centennial edition of the Complete Poems of Hart Crane.

Thomas Lux has stated, "If the devil came to me and said 'Tom, you can be dead and Hart can be alive,' I'd take the deal in a heartbeat if the devil promised, when arisen, Hart would have to go straight into A.A."

The literary critic Adam Kirsch has argued that "[Crane has been] a special case in the canon of American modernism, his reputation never quite as secure as that of Eliot or Stevens."

In 2011, the American poet Gerald Stern wrote an essay on Crane in which he stated, "Some, when they talk about Crane, emphasize his drinking, his chaotic life, his self-doubt, and the dangers of his sexual life, but he was able to manage these things, even though he died at 32, and create a poetry that was tender, attentive, wise, and radically original." At the conclusion of his essay, Stern writes, "Crane is always with me, and whatever I wrote, short poem or long, strange or unstrange—his voice, his tone, his sense of form, his respect for life, his love of the word, his vision have affected me. But I don't want, in any way, to exploit or appropriate this amazing poet whom I am, after all, so different from, he who may be, finally, the great poet, in English, of the twentieth century."

Beyond poetry, Crane's suicide inspired several works of art by noted artist Jasper Johns, including "Periscope", "Land's End", and "Diver", as well as A Symphony of Three Orchestras by Elliott Carter (inspired by The Bridge) and the painting Eight Bells' Folly, Memorial for Hart Crane by Marsden Hartley.

== Depictions ==
Crane is the subject of The Broken Tower, a 2011 American student film by the actor James Franco who wrote, directed, and starred in the film which was the master's thesis project for his MFA in filmmaking at New York University. He loosely based his script on Paul Mariani's 1999 nonfiction book The Broken Tower: A Life of Hart Crane. Despite being a student film, The Broken Tower was shown at the Los Angeles Film Festival in 2011 and received DVD distribution in 2012 by Focus World Films.

Crane appears as a character in Samuel R. Delany's story "Atlantis: Model 1924", and in The Illuminatus! Trilogy by Robert Shea and Robert Anton Wilson.

== Bibliography ==
- White Buildings. (1926)
- The Bridge. Brooklyn Heights. (1930)
- Last letters of Hart Crane: with a commentary on the poet and the man. (1934)
- Two letters: Hart Crane. (1934)
- The Collected Poems of Hart Crane. Ed. Waldo Frank. UK: Boriswood.
- The Letters of Hart Crane, 1916–1932. Ed. Brom Weber. (1952)
- Complete Poems and Selected Letters and Prose of Hart Crane, Ed. Brom Weber, New York:Liveright Publishing Corporation. (1966)
- The poet's vocation: selections from letters of Hölderlin, Rimbaud, & Hart Crane, Ed. William Burford. (1967).
- Robber Rocks: Letters and Memories of Hart Crane, 1923–1932, Ed. Susan Jenkins Brown. (1968)
- Twenty-one letters from Hart Crane to George Bryan, Ohio State University Libraries. (1968)
- Letters of Hart Crane and His Family, ed. Tom Lewis, New York: Columbia University Press. (1974)
- Hart Crane and Yvor Winters: Their Literary Correspondence, ed. Thomas Parkinson, Berkeley: University of California Press (1978)
- Hart Crane and Yvor Winters, rebuttal and review: a new Crane letter, reprint by Duke University (1978).
- Hart Crane to Charles Harris: February 20, 1926, Kent, Ohio: Kent State University Libraries. (1978)
- Complete poems, Ed. Brom Weber, Newcastle upon Tyne: Bloodaxe Books. (1984)
- The Complete Poems of Hart Crane, ed. Marc Simon, New York: Liveright (1986)
- O My Land, My Friends: The Selected Letters of Hart Crane, New York: Four Walls Eight Windows (1997)
- Hart Crane: Complete Poems and Selected Letters, ed. Langdon Hammer, New York: The Library of America (2006)

== See also ==
- Modernist poetry in English
- American poetry
- Appalachian Spring
