= George Sibley =

George Sibley may refer to:

- George Sibley Johns (1857–1941), American journalist
- George Sibley (1942–2005), second husband of American convicted murderer Lynda Lyon Block
- George Sibley, a character from the American drama television series Six Feet Under
- George C. Sibley (1782–1863), American explorer, soldier, Indian agent, and politician
