= White Buildings =

1926 poetry collection by Hart Crane

First edition (publ. Boni and Liveright)

White Buildings was the first collection (1926) of poetry by Hart Crane, an American modernist poet, critical to both lyrical and language poetic traditions.

The book features well-known pieces like "For the Marriage of Faustus and Helen," the "Voyages" series, and some of his most famous lyrics including "My Grandmother's Love Letters" and "Chaplinesque." Harold Bloom has argued that this collection alone, if perhaps taken with his later lyric, 'The Broken Tower,' could have secured Crane's reputation as one of the best American poets of the 20th century.

== Preface ==
Eugene O'Neill was happy to help Crane by writing a preface to White Buildings, but, increasingly frustrated with his failure to articulate an understanding of the poems, left it to Allen Tate to finish the piece.

== Reviews ==
According to the Poetry Foundation, "this work earned [Crane] substantial respect as an imposing stylist, one whose lyricism and imagery recalled the French Romantics Baudelaire and Rimbaud".

One notable review of the book was mixed. In The New Republic, Edmund Wilson wrote that Crane had "a remarkable style.. almost something like a great style, if there could be such a thing as a great style...[but it's] not, so far as one can see, applied to any subject at all". Crane responded to this criticism by calling Wilson's article "half-baked".

The poet and critic Randall Jarrell singled out "the mesmeric rhetoric of [the poem] 'Voyages II' [as] one of the most beautiful of all of those poems in which love, death, and sleep 'are fused for an instant in one floating flower'".
