= The Broken Tower =

1932 poem by Hart Crane

"The Broken Tower" is the last poem meant to be published by poet Hart Crane in 1932. In keeping with the varieties and difficulties of Crane criticism, the poem has been interpreted widely—as death ode, life ode, process poem, visionary poem, poem on failed vision—but its biographical impetus out of Crane's first heterosexual affair (with Peggy Cowley, estranged wife of Malcolm Cowley) is generally undisputed. Written early in the year, the poem was rejected by Poetry, and only appeared in print (in The New Republic) after Crane's famous suicide by water (compare his great homosexual love-cycle "Voyages").
