= Biljana D. Obradović =

Serbian-American poet, critic, translator, and professor of English

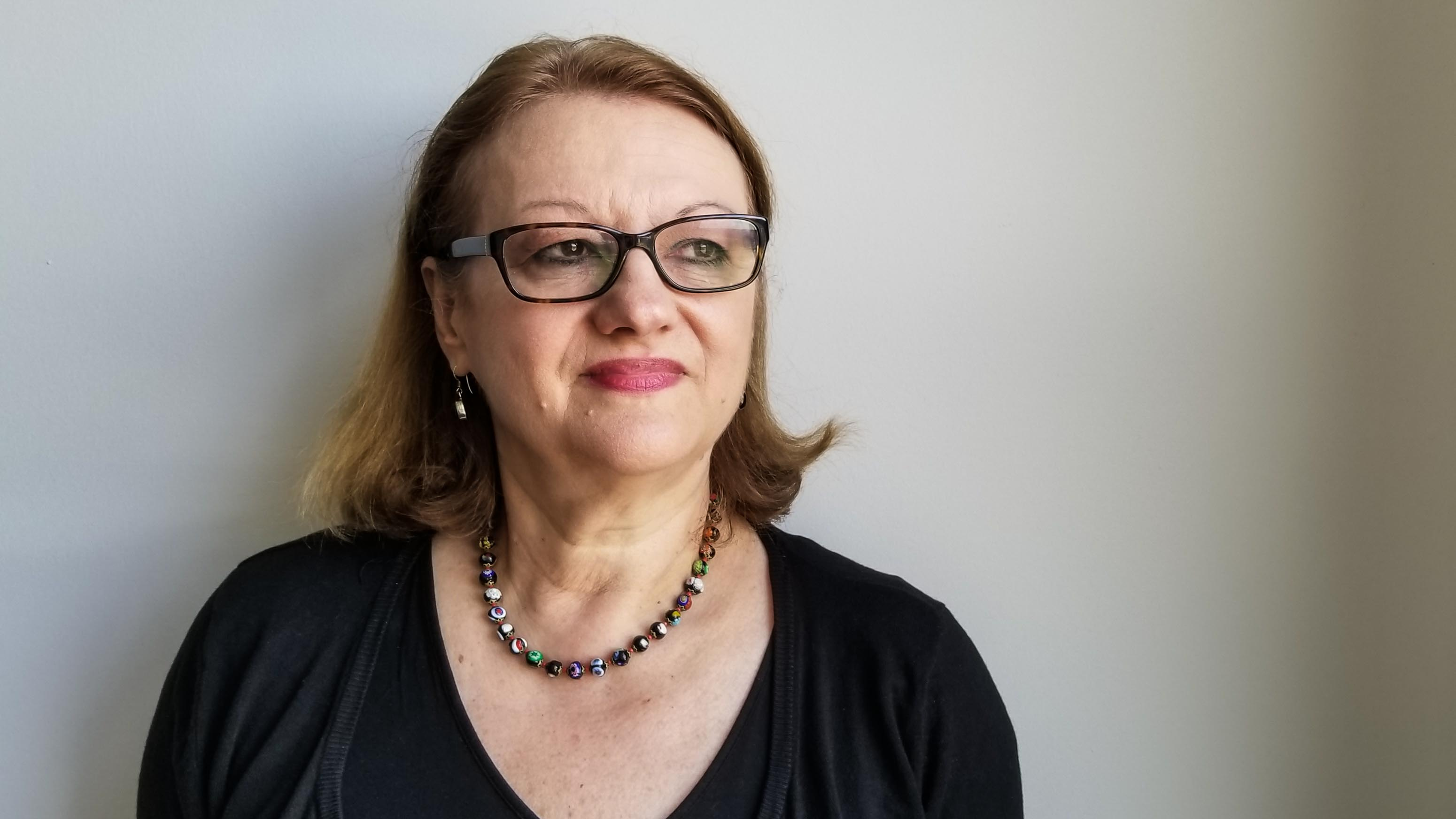
- Born: February 25, 1961 (age 65); Bitola, Socialist Federal Republic of Yugoslavia (now Republic of North Macedonia)
- Education: Belgrade University (B.A.); Virginia Commonwealth University (M.F.A.); University of Nebraska–Lincoln (Ph.D.)
- Occupations: professor, poet, critic, translator, editor
- Writing career
- Language: Serbian, English, Modern Greek, French
- Notable awards: Rastko Petrović Award: Best Book (1997); Miloš Djordjević Book Prize (2019/2024)
- Website: biljanaobradovic.wordpress.com

Biljana D. Obradović is a Serbian-American poet, critic, translator, and professor of English who has lived in Yugoslavia, Greece, India, and the United States.

== Early life ==
Obradoviċ was born in Bitola, Macedonia to Serbian parents, Dragoslav and Vera Obradoviċ, who originally came from the area of Aleksinac, Serbia. Her father was a customs officer, then a diplomat. She learned English at the age of ten at Pinewood Schools of Thessaloniki in Salonika, Greece which she attended from grade five to nine. She moved to Belgrade, Serbia, briefly then to Bombay, India, where she attended Cathedral and John Connon School during high school.

In 1980, she returned to Yugoslavia to pursue a B.A. in English language and literature at the Faculty of Philology of Belgrade University. In 1988, she moved to Richmond, Virginia, for an M.F.A. in creative writing from Virginia Commonwealth University, which she received in 1991, after which she moved to Lincoln, Nebraska, for a Ph.D. in English from the University of Nebraska–Lincoln.

== Career ==
Obradoviċ considers herself a transnational poet, drawing on her lived experience in many countries and her fluency in multiple languages.

Her first collection of poems, Frozen Embraces, a bilingual edition, won the Rastko Petrović Award for the Best Poem of 1997 and Best Book of 1998. Subsequent collections include Le Riche Monde in 1999, Three Poets in New Orleans in 2000, Little Disruptions in 2012, and Incognito in 2017.

In addition to her own poetry, other works include her Serbian translations of John Gery's American Ghost: Selected Poems (Raška Škola, Belgrade/ Merrick, New York, Cross-Cultural Communications, 1999), Serbian translations of Stanley Kunitz, The Long Boat (co-published by Plato, Belgrade and Cross-Cultural Communications, Merrick, NY, 2007), and Fives: Fifty Poems by Serbian and American Poets, A Bilingual Anthology, as editor and translator (Co-published by Contact Line, Belgrade, and Cross-Cultural Communications, Merrick, NY, 2002), an English translation of Bratislav Milanović's, Doors in a Meadow (New York: Edwin Mellen Press, 2011), a translation of poems by Patrizia de Rachewiltz, Dear Friends (Književno Društvo Sveti Sava, 2012), and a translation of a selection of poems by Bruce Weigl, What Saves Us (Beogradska Knjiga 2013).

Obradović's work has appeared in such anthologies as Like Thunder: Poets Respond to Violence in America and Key West: A Collection, as well as Kletva [Curse].

She also reviews books for World Literature Today and others.

In 2019, Obradović received the Book Prize from the North American Society for Serbian Studies for Cat Painters, an anthology of contemporary Serbian poetry, and her translation of Dubravka Đurić's Politics of Hope won the prize in 2024. She received the Masaryk Academy of Arts Medal for Artistic Achievements, October 20, 2000, Prague, Czech Republic, and is a member of the Association of Writers of Serbia. She is professor of English at Xavier University of Louisiana, New Orleans, where she lives with her husband John Gery and son Petar.

== Published works ==
=== Poetry collections ===
Frozen Embraces/ Zamrznuti Zagrljaji (A bilingual, English/Serbian, collection of poems). Belgrade/Merrick, NY: Center of Emigrants from Serbia/Cross-Cultural Communications, 1997.

Le Riche Monde (A bilingual, English/Serbian, collection of poems). Belgrade/ Merrick, NY: Raška Škola/ Cross-Cultural Communications, 1999.

Three Poets in New Orleans: Lee Meitzen Grue, Biljana D. Obradović, Patricia A. Ward. Ed. Thomas Bonner. New Orleans: Xavier Review Press, 2000 (thirteen poems).

Little Disruptions/Mali Poremećaji (A bilingual edition). Transl. from English by Tatjana Stefanović et al. Niš: Niš Cultural Center Press, 2012.

Incognito. Cincinnati: Word Tech Communications, 2017.

Little Disruptions. Cincinnati: WordTech Communications, Oct. 2022.

Called by Distances. Baton Rouge: Louisiana State University Press, 2026.

=== Poetry translations ===
Gery, John. American Ghost / Američki duh (A bilingual selection), Transl. Biljana D. Obradović into Serbian. Belgrade/ Merrick, NY: Raška Škola/ Cross-Cultural Communications, 1999.

Kunitz, Stanley. The Long Boat/ Dugi Čamac (A bilingual selection. Translation: Biljana D. Obradović into Serbian of the poetry by US Poet Laureate, Stanley Kunitz). Belgrade / New York: Plato/ Cross-Cultural Communications, July 2007.

Milanović, Bratislav. The Unnecessary Chronicle. Transl. Biljana D. Obradović from Serbian into English. Smederevo: Smederevo Poetry Autumn, 2008.

Milanović, Bratislav. Doors in a Meadow. Transl. Biljana D. Obradović from Serbian into English. New York: The Edwin Mellon Press, 2011.

De Rachewiltz, Patrizia, Poems and Photographs by Lynda Smith. Dear Friends/ Dragi Prijatelji. (A bilingual edition). Transl. Biljana D. Obradović Belgrade from English into Serbian. Belgrade: Književno Društvo “Sveti Sava,” 2012.

Weigl, Bruce. What Saves Us / Šta nas spasava. Trans. Biljana D. Obradovic. Belgrade: Beogradska Knjiga, 2013.

Osundare, Niyi. The Tongue Is a Pink Fire / Jezik Je Ružičasta Vatra. Transl. Biljana Obradović.. Belgrade: Udruženje Književnika Srbije, 2015.

Karanović, Zvonko. Sleepwalkers on a Picnic. Transl. Biljana D. Obradović. New Orleans: Dialogos Press, Sept. 2019.

Djurić, Dubravka. The Politics of Hope (After the War): Selected and New Poems. Trans. Biljana D. Obradović. New York: Roof Books, Nov. 2023.

=== Edited anthologies ===
Obradović, Biljana D. and Dubravka Djurić, eds. Cat Painters: An Anthology of Contemporary Serbian Poetry (preface by Charles Bernstein). New Orleans: Dialogos Press, 2016.

Obradović, Biljana D., ed. Fives: Fifty Poems by Serbian and American Poets, A Bilingual Anthology. (Editor and translator with an introduction.) Belgrade / Merrick, NY: Contact Line / Cross-Cultural Communications, 2002.

Serbian Poetry. Atlanta Review. Spring/Summer 2021. Transl. Biljana Obradović, and Co-guest edited with Dubravka Djurić (Translations by various Serbian poets, introduction and bios). pp. 39-146.

=== Critical works ===
Dacey, Philip. Heavenly Muse: Essays on Poetry. Biljana D. Obradović, Ed. New Orleans: Lavender Ink, 2020.

== See also ==
- List of Serbs
- Charles Simic
- Serbs in America
