= Peggy Cowley =

American painter

- Born: Marguerite Frances Baird; 1890
- Died: September 23, 1970 (aged 79–80); Tivoli, New York
- Spouses: Orrick Johns (div. 1919) Malcolm Cowley (m. 1919; div. 1931)

Marguerite Frances Cowley (née Baird; 1890 – September 23, 1970), known as Peggy Cowley and also as Peggy Baird and by her first married name Peggy Johns, was an American landscape painter. She was married to poet-playwright Orrick Johns and writer Malcolm Cowley and was the lover of playwright Eugene O'Neill and poet Hart Crane.

== Activism ==
Baird was a member of the women's suffrage movement. In 1917, she invited Dorothy Day to join the National Woman's Party. They were jailed for 60 days for their protests but were released after 16 days and pardoned by President Woodrow Wilson.

== Personal life ==
After divorcing her first husband, Johns, she married Malcolm Cowley in 1919. In 1931 she moved to Mexico to obtain a divorce. While there her long friendship with poet Hart Crane turned into Crane's first and only documented heterosexual affair. As Crane wrote to a friend about his romance with Peggy Cowley, "Rather amazing things have happened to me since Xmas. Peggy Cowley ... is mainly responsible". This affair has since become a major point of interest for Crane scholars—particularly for those reading him with an eye toward his sexuality—as his engagement with heterosexual life is a determining theme in his last major poem, "The Broken Tower". Appearing at moments to be a highly symbolic affirmation of their relationship, as well as a denial of his homosexual past (the 'broken tower' can be read as a defeated phallus), the poem was written just months before Crane committed suicide by jumping off of a passenger ship in 1932, following a trip to Mexico.

Though their relationship had begun to deteriorate by that time (Crane said he had "misunderstood and misinterpreted Peggy's character quite badly"), Cowley was with Crane on the boat, and she figures briefly, but poignantly, in the events leading up to his death.Hart Crane and family papers Almost thirty years later, she wrote about this period in an article for Venture, "The Last Days of Hart Crane."

After Crane's death, Cowley married twice more and converted to Catholicism at the age of 60. Cowley died of cancer at Dorothy Day's Catholic Worker Farm in Tivoli, New York, where Cowley had resided for ten years.
