= Paul Mariani =

American poet

Paul Mariani (born 1940 in New York City) is an American poet and is University Professor Emeritus at Boston College, specializing in Modern American and British Poetry, religion and literature, and creative writing (memoir, biography, and poetry). He has authored 22 books, including biographies of William Carlos Williams, John Berryman, Robert Lowell, Hart Crane, Gerard Manley Hopkins, and Wallace Stevens. His awards include a Guggenheim Fellowship and several National Endowment for the Arts and National Endowment for the Humanities Fellowships, and the 2012 film biopic of Hart Crane, The Broken Tower, is based on Mariani's biography of the same title.

== Early life and education ==
Born February 29, 1940, in Astoria, Queens, he grew up in New York City and Long Island and is the oldest of seven children. He was educated at Chaminade, Beacon Marianist Prep, Mineola High School, Manhattan College, Colgate University, and the Graduate Center of the City University of New York, where his mentor was the Dante scholar Allen Mandelbaum.

== Career ==
He taught at Colgate University (1963), Hunter College (1964–1967), Lehman College (1965–1966) and the John Jay College of Criminal Justice (1966–1968). From 1968 until 2000 he taught poetry and literature at the University of Massachusetts and was a Distinguished University Professor. From 2000 until his retirement he taught poetry and literature at Boston College and held a Chair as the University Professor of English. In addition he taught at the Bread Loaf School of English in the 1980s and at the Bread Loaf Writers' Conference from 1982 until 1996, and then for the Image conferences in Colorado Springs, Santa Fe, Whidbey Island, and Mount Holyoke. He has lectured across the United States and Europe, including several times at the New York Encounter.

Mariani has lectured and given readings widely in the United States and abroad and has published over 250 essays, introductions, chapters in anthologies and scholarly encyclopedias, and reviews, as well as being the author of 22 books. These include biographies of William Carlos Williams, John Berryman, Robert Lowell, Hart Crane, Gerard Manley Hopkins, and Wallace Stevens. His biography of Williams was a finalist for the National Book Award. He has published ten volumes of poetry, most recently '"All That Will Be New" and "Sing Me a Song, She said," (Slant Books), and The Mystery of It All: The Vocation of Poetry in the Twilight of Modernism (Paraclete Press) as well as commentaries on Hopkins, Williams, and many others. He is also the author of Thirty Days: On Retreat with the Exercises of St. Ignatius.

His awards include a Guggenheim Fellowship and several National Endowment for the Arts and National Endowment for the Humanities Fellowships. He has taught poetry workshops at the Bread Loaf Writers Conference and the Glen Workshops, and, in 2009, he received the John Ciardi Award for Lifetime Achievement in Poetry. In September 2019 he was presented with the inaugural Flannery O’Connor Lifetime Achievement Award at the Catholic Imagination Conference held at Loyola University Chicago.

James Franco's film biopic of Hart Crane, The Broken Tower, released in 2012, is based on Mariani's biography of the same title. In 2016, Mariani published The Whole Harmonium: The Life of Wallace Stevens about writer Wallace Stevens.

== Bibliography ==
=== Poetry ===
- Timing Devices: Poems (Pennyroyal Press 1977)
- Crossing Cocytus: Poems (Grove Press 1982)
- Prime Mover: Poems 1981-1985 (Grove Press 1985)
- Salvage Operations: New and Selected Poems (W. W. Norton & Company 1990)
- The Great Wheel: Poems (W. W. Norton & Company 1996)
- Deaths & Transfigurations: Poems (Paraclete Press 2005)
- Epitaphs for the Journey: New, Selected and Revised Poems (Cascade Books 2012)
- Ordinary Time: Poems (Slant 2020)
- All That Will Be New: Poems (Slant 2022)
- Sing Me a Song, She Said: Poems (Slant 2026)

=== Prose ===
- A Commentary on the Complete Poems of Gerard Manley Hopkins (Cornell University Press 1970)
- William Carlos Williams: The Poet and His Critics (American Library Association 1975)
- William Carlos Williams: A New World Naked (McGraw Hill 1981, W.W. Norton 1990 revised)
- A Usable Past: Essays on Modern & Contemporary Poetry (University of Massachusetts Press 1984)
- Dream Song: The Life of John Berryman (William Morrow 1990, Paragon Books 1992, University of Massachusetts Press,1996)
- Lost Puritan: A Life of Robert Lowell (W.W. Norton 1994)
- The Broken Tower: A Life of Hart Crane (W.W. Norton 1999)
- Thirty Days: On Retreat with the Exercises of St.Ignatius (Penguin Books 2002)
- God and the Imagination: Poetry, Poets, and the Ineffable (University of Georgia Press 2002)
- Gerard Manley Hopkins: A Life (Viking/Penguin 2008)
- The Whole Harmonium: The Life of Wallace Stevens (Simon & Schuster 2016)
- The Mystery of It All: The Vocation of Poetry in the Twilight of Modernism (Paraclete Press 2019)
