= Roger Dickinson-Brown =

American poet

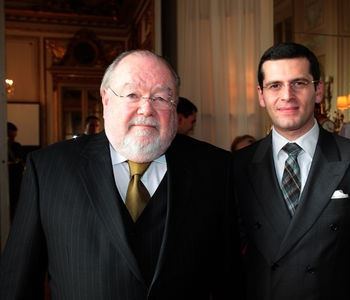
Roger Dickinson-Brown with Simon Le Boeuf

Roger Dickinson-Brown (1944–2015) was an American poet, author and teacher who wrote in English and French. After studying under Yvor Winters at Stanford University, he published and broadcast poems, criticism and reviews (Song, The Southern Review, World Order, WONO-FM) in the 1970s, and taught in the Program in Writing Arts at the State University of New York at Oswego.

In 1976, Robert Hayden, Poet Laureate Consultant in Poetry to the Library of Congress, wrote that Dickinson-Brown "is a gifted poet who has begun to attract favorable attention," and that "he has distinguished himself as a teacher of creative writing and modern poetry." The entire book-length series Jonathan: A Death Miscellany was broadcast over WONO-FM (New York) in April 1976. During that broadcast Dickinson-Brown argued that most poets write too much, and indicated that he wished to leave only a small number of poems at his death. At about the same time, he stopped publishing his work in literary reviews and journals, and more or less entirely withdrew from conventional publication.

Dickinson-Brown, who abandoned university tenure at SUNY Oswego and spoke of former academic colleagues as devotees of an obscurantist cult, adapted his own writing to clear commentary on an “unpoetically” wide range of subjects. Here, for example, is his epitaph for the great economist Angus Maddison, 1926-2010 (the lines are actually carved on Maddison's tombstone):

Friend or stranger, stop and shed a tear:
Gentle Angus Maddison lies here.
Joining the social sciences with art,
He took human misery to heart
And mixed time, space and math to set men free
From want. Angus hated poverty.

(This poem also appears on the frontispiece of World Economic Performance: Past, Present and Future, D.S. Prasada and Bart Van Ark, eds., Edward Elgar Publishing Ltd, 2013.)

Some of Dickinson-Brown’s usually short poems are written in experimental (mostly French-style syllabic) meters, but most are classical in both form and subject. They are often written in the plain style and were evidently influenced by the epigrammatic tradition of Catullus, Martial (whom he translates) and J. V. Cunningham, including their social satire and sometimes risqué humor. The most frequent themes are loneliness, age, love, death, physics and religion. The French poems are all epigrams.

== Published works ==
=== Poetry ===
- Jonathan: A Death Miscellany (1974)
- The Dilapidated Heart: Poems 1965-2003 (2004)
- Bread and Wine: Poems 1988-2009 (2009)
- Catullus & Martial: Translations & Imitations (2011)

=== Prose ===
- Three French Murder Mysteries (2005)
- Notes pour mes petits-enfants / Notes for My Grandchildren (2008) (bilingual French-English)
- Ragtime (second edition, 2012) (bilingual French-English)
- Better English Than Yours: A Little Guide to Good English and All That (2013)

=== Other works ===
- The Art of Edmund Waller: A Technical and Prosodical Analysis (1976)
- Lire la presse en anglais, with Guy de Dampierre, Editions Alistair (1999)
- Ecrire en anglais, with Guy de Dampierre, Casteilla (2007)
