= In Defense of Reason =

1947 work by Yvor Winters

- Author: Yvor Winters
- Language: English
- Subject: American literature American poetry
- Genre: Literary criticism
- Publisher: Alan Swallow Press; Ohio University Press
- Publication date: 1947
- Publication place: United States
- Pages: 611

In Defense of Reason is a three-volume work of literary criticisms by the American poet and literary critic Yvor Winters. First published in 1947, the book is known for its meticulous study of metrical verse and for its examples of Winters' system of ethical criticism.

The collection consists of three books of critical essays that Winters had written earlier. The first, Primitivism and Decadence: A Study of American Experimental Poetry, is Winters' revised doctoral dissertation on the classification and analysis of poetic structures. The second, Maule's Curse: Seven Studies in the History of American Obscurantism, is a study of seven prominent American novelists and poets of the 19th century. The third, The Anatomy of Nonsense, is a study of several prominent writers associated with modernism. The book also contains three general essays that are crucial to understanding Winters as a critic and poet: the Foreword to the whole collection, "Preliminary Problems," which is in effect the introduction to The Anatomy of Nonsense, and "The Significance of 'The Bridge,' by Hart Crane, or 'What Are We to Do with Professor X?'".

Though he started his poetic career in the early 1920s as a free-verse imagist, by late in that decade Winters had become a modern classicist, of a sort. He argued that poets should use metrical verse more often in their compositions. He also argued that poems should have rational structures and favor discursive language rather than the loose, associationist structures and styles favored by the moderns, which emphasize the emotions and personal expression. As is explained in these essays, Winters considered the moderns the literary descendants of Romanticism.

== Content ==
The study of the structure of modern poetry in Primitivism and Decadence: A Study of American Experimental Poetry is complex and challenging. Winters presents an elaborate and unique classification system of structures and methods, with an assessment of each kind of structure or approach to help readers understand how poets write in the modern age. In the course of his discussion, Winters also lays out his moral theory of literature, along with his close study of metrical verse and his unusual and difficult theory of free verse, in which he first composed his poetry.

Maule's Curse: Seven Studies in the History of American Obscurantism offers erudite short studies and appraisals of the writing careers, work by work, of James Fenimore Cooper (moderately favorable), Nathaniel Hawthorne (moderately favorable), Herman Melville (strongly favorable), Edgar Allan Poe (sharply unfavorable), Emily Dickinson (favorable, with qualifications), Henry James (favorable, with qualifications), and the little-known American poet Jones Very (favorable), who was a friend of Ralph Waldo Emerson. Winters' evaluations of these writers and their works are sometimes unusual, if not eccentric.

The third work in the collection, The Anatomy of Nonsense, offers short, crisp, but detailed overviews and interpretations of the writings of Henry Adams (moderately unfavorable), T.S. Eliot (unfavorable), and Wallace Stevens (favorable, with qualifications). In addition, this section contains an essay on American critic and poet John Crowe Ransom that serves as Winters' defense of his own critical concepts, which Ransom had judged to be wrongheaded.

The collection is so diverse that it is difficult to characterize in summary. Winters was opposed to the ascendant Romantic theory of literature, as he understood it. He strove to foster a particular kind of classicism in literature, his own brand of stately, polished, rational, discursive poetry (as well as controlled, stately fiction) that emphasizes ideas and concepts. Across this collection he also reveals his growing penchant for rating individual works of literature and for the centrality of literary evaluation to criticism, as well as his nascent interest in revising the canon of literature to conform to his ideas of classical greatness, or near perfection in poetry. (Winters uses the term, great, frequently in these writings, and elsewhere, to refer to artworks that he judges to be nearly perfect literary achievements of one kind or another.)

The three general essays in critical theory mentioned in the introduction are crucial to understanding Winters' general theory of literature and his misgivings about and opposition to Romanticism. In the "Foreword," Winters gives a lengthy and learned summation of his theory of poetry, which he calls the moral theory of literature. Winters contrasts this theory with his explications of the didactic, hedonistic, and Romantic theories, which he holds to be the three main critical strands of thought in western literary criticism. In the "Preliminary Problems" essay, found in The Anatomy of Nonsense, he gives a trenchant, painstakingly logical, step-by-step summary of the criteria he uses in evaluating poems and assessing their greatness, particularly precise diction that subordinates emotion to conceptual content and rational structure.

In the concluding "Bridge" essay, also found in The Anatomy of Nonsense, Winters examines the literary and psychological dangers facing poets who push Romantic ideas to what Winters believed to be their logical limits, one of whom was, in his judgment, Hart Crane. ("The Bridge" referred to is a famous poem by Hart Crane, with whom Winters briefly corresponded about poetry shortly before Crane's death in 1932.) The essay considers Crane as a disciple of Walt Whitman, whose romantic concepts of life and literature Winters discusses at some length.

== Style ==
Yvor Winters' memorable prose is considered highly polished, formal, and exacting. As a writer, he was a stylist and a scrupulous interpreter of literary artworks. He was often and sometimes still is mistakenly considered one of the New Critics because of his many careful readings of individual works of poetry, fiction, and drama. But, unlike the New Critics, his close reading was performed in the service of his moral theory of literature.

In Defense of Reason also features Winters' acerbic comments in opposition to, and sometimes strongly disapproving of, various writers and critics usually held in high esteem in modern literary culture. For such comments he has been often called "brutal," which, however, appears to be an exaggeration. Winters wrote like most other hard-hitting critics who waged battle in the critical wars surrounding the New Criticism in the middle of the 20th century.

== Comments ==
- The irony is that his criticism could have been produced only in America and nowhere else in the world; it is as distinct a product of American life, though in the opposite direction, as any number of items of our popular culture. In its wrongheadedness, idiosyncrasies, rancorous eccentricities, and provincialism, it takes its place in the long line of that pathetic and peculiarly American phenomenon: the wandering off of superior gifts into private byways.
- Winters stands in the peculiar position of a critic who uses the methods of analysis of the New Critics but rejects their evaluation of major trends in 20th-century poetry, in particular their high evaluation of Eliot's work. Winters often enough seems dogmatic and limited in his evaluations, but his analyses of poems are always perceptive and his theories, if not acceptable, have the virtue of being challenging.
- Still there is no question of the soundness of many of Winters' judgments or the rightness of his desire that art be moral. The views have influenced various excellent writers and critics. Among them stand Robert Lowell, J. V. Cunningham, John Williams, Ann Stanford, N. Scott Momaday, Donald Davie, Wesley Trimpi, and Janet Lewis. Winters' belief that, run on whim and emotion, art would become directionless gains credibility from much of the poetry currently published. Under a banner of cultural pluralism, views are developing neither within the canon of a writer nor across canons, and, as with the weather in places, a reader has only to wait a few moments if he doesn't like what he now has.
- Perhaps Winters' most striking and durable achievement is his account of the morality of poetic meter (In Defense of Reason, pp. 103–52, The Function of Criticism, pp. 81–100). The identity of a poetic line or of a whole poem, its "soul," inheres not primarily in ideas or images but in the way it moves. Rhythm sounds at once in the "sensual ear" and in the "mind's ear" and in itself constitutes a mode of consciousness that facilitates certain mental operations and precludes others.
- Of [modern poet-critics], Yvor Winters, perhaps, has fallen furthest. This is a great shame, for it is just Winters’s brand of seriousness and his emphasis on logic and reason in poetry that contemporary verse sorely wants. The current neglect may have as much to do with the notorious critic’s crabbed, sometimes contradictory and dogmatic style. Winters’s stern call for a "moral poetry" was provocative, while his more cracked judgments earned him the opprobrium of many who, like Stanley Edgar Hyman in The Armed Vision (1947), saw Winters as "an excessively irritating and bad critic of some importance."
- The essay on [Henry] James shows a comparable power for summoning up characteristic particulars that suggest qualities of the whole work, as does the marvelous evocation of the psychology of Henry Adams, whose great history Winters champions as a major work in our literature. Very few critics have Winters' ability to vivify in prose the range of their reading — all of Cooper, Melville, James, and Adams, for examples — and the tone of his essays sometimes reflects the irritation and strain of an essentially self-taught man, an artist of the first rank, who explored American literature before it became a specialized field of study. The concerns of these central essays are drawn out, as variations on some themes, in the subsequent essays on Ransom and Crane, works of great rigor and insight.

== Bibliography ==
- Comito, Terry (1986). In Defense of Winters: The poetry and prose of Yvor Winters. University of Wisconsin Press. ISBN 0-299-10580-6.
- Davis, Dick (1983). Wisdom and Wilderness: The achievement of Yvor Winters. Athens, GA: University of Georgia Press. ISBN 0-8203-0631-2.
- Powell, Grosvenor (1983). Yvor Winters, An Annotated Bibliography, 1919-1982. Metuchen, N.J.: Scarecrow Press. ISBN 0-8108-1653-9.
- Sexton, Richard J. (1973). The Complex of Yvor Winters' Criticism. The Hague: Mouton.
- Stanford, Donald E. (1983). Revolution and Convention in Modern Poetry: studies in Ezra Pound, T.S. Eliot, Wallace Stevens, Edwin Arlington Robinson, and Yvor Winters. Newark, N.J.: University of Delaware Press. ISBN 0-87413-197-9.
- Stanford, Donald E. (Winter 1981). "Yvor Winters Issue". Southern Review. 17 (3).
- Trimpi, Helen Pinkerton (1999). "Introduction". In R.L. Barth (ed.). The Selected Poems of Yvor Winters. Athens, Ohio: Swallow Press/Ohio University Press. ISBN 0-8040-1013-7.
- Winters, Yvor (1947). In Defense of Reason. The Swallow Press & W. Morrow and Company.
