= Laura Whitcomb =

American novelist and teacher

- Born: December 19, 1958 (age 67); Pasadena, California, U.S.
- Occupation: Author
- Website: www.laurawhitcomb.com

Laura Whitcomb (born December 19, 1958) is an American novelist and teacher. She is best known for her book A Certain Slant of Light, which has been optioned for a film by Summit Entertainment. Whitcomb has won three Kay Snow awards and was runner-up in the Bulwer-Lytton Writing Contest.

== Background ==
Whitcomb grew up in Pasadena California in a mildly haunted house. She received a degree in English from California State University in 1993. Whitcomb wrote several books including A Certain Slant of Light in 2005, and its companion novel Under the Light in 2014. She also authored the historical fiction novel, The Fetch and a couple of how-to books titled Novel Shortcuts: Ten Techniques to Ensure a Great First Draft, and Your First Novel: An Author Agent Team Share the Keys to Achieving Your Dreams. She has taught language arts in California and Hawaii and was the runner up in the Bulwer-Lytton writing contest for the best first sentence of the worst science fiction novel never written. She lives in Wilsonville, Oregon.

== Reception ==
Critical reception for Whitcomb's work has been mixed to positive. Kirkus Reviews has largely panned Whitcomb's work, criticizing it for being "forgettable" and not living up to its promise. In comparison, the American Library Association made A Certain Slant of Light one of their book picks for 2006 and the book was praised by Publishers Weekly. However, A Certain Slant of Light was chosen for the "Discover Great New Writers" program at Barnes & Noble bookstores. The Fetch was #5 in the top ten of Children's Indie Next List 2009.

== Published works ==
=== Fiction ===
- A Certain Slant of Light (2005)
- Under the Light (2014)
- The Fetch (2010)

=== Non-fiction ===
- Novel Shortcuts (2011)
- Your First Novel: An Author Agent Team Share the Keys to Achieving Your Dream (2012, with Ann Rittenberg)
