= Alice Crane Williams =

American composer

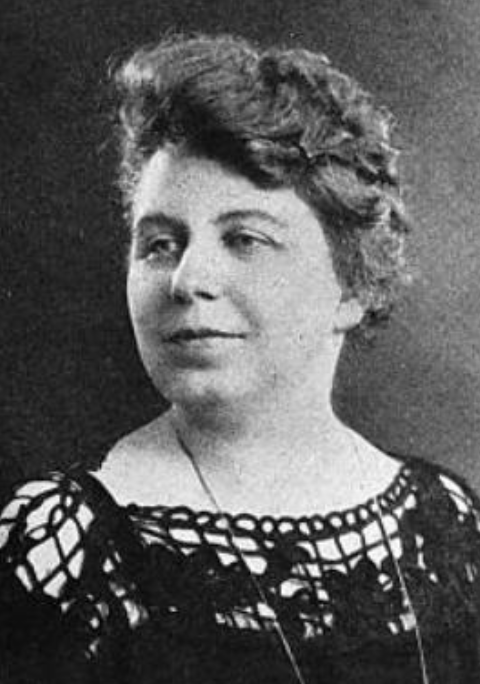
- Alice Crane, later Williams, from a 1926 publication
- Born: Alice Ella Crane; August 29, 1879; Garrettsville, Ohio, U.S.
- Died: October 24, 1964 (aged 85); University Heights, Ohio, U.S.
- Occupations: Composer, literary editor
- Relatives: Hart Crane (nephew)

Alice Ella Crane Williams (August 29, 1879 – October 24, 1964) was an American composer and literary editor. She was president of the Composers and Authors Association of America.

== Early life and education ==
Alice Crane was born in Garrettsville, Ohio, the daughter of Arthur Edward Crane and Ella M. Beardsley Crane. Her brother was confectioner Clarence Arthur Crane, the inventor of Life Savers candy, and her nephew was poet Hart Crane. She graduated from Hiram College, and pursued further music studies in Europe.

== Career ==
Crane was a pianist, composer, and lecturer. Her compositions were called "quite modern in trend and of immense interest" by a 1926 publication. She also taught music.

Crane gave a performances of her recent works at the National League of American Pen Women conference in Washington in 1926, and at the Poetry Society of America's annual concert in New York in 1927. She was president of the Composers and Authors Association of America in the 1940s. From 1945 to 1964, Williams edited American Weave, a literary journal based in Cleveland, with her husband, Loring Eugene Williams.

== Compositions ==
- "Mountain Harmony" (1926)
- "Touch Me Not" (1926)
- "Cloudland" (1926, setting for text by William Sharp)
- "The Veil" (1926, setting for text by Walter de la Mare)
- "Music" (1926)
- "The Revelation" (1926, setting for text by Edwin Markham)
- "Danish Suite" (1926)
- "River Trilogy" (1926, lyrics by Ruth Mason Rice)
- "This thy hour o soul" (1953, setting for text by Walt Whitman)
- "In the Cathedral" (1954, organ suite)
- "Flight of the Mariner" (1954, a song cycle based on poems of Dorothy Rudolph Byard)
- "Autumn Song" (1960, setting for text by William Blake)
- "March Triomphale", "Voix Celeste", "Vox Humana" (date unknown)

== Personal life ==
Crane married Loring E. Williams in 1937. She died in 1964, at the age of 85, in University Heights, Ohio. Loring Williams organized the Hart Crane and Alice Crane Williams Memorial Fund, to support literary publications, and an annual poetry award.
