= Alys Williams =

Alys Williams may refer to:

- Alys Williams (singer) (born c. 1988), British singer
- Alys Williams (water polo) (born 1994), American water polo player
