= A Certain Slant of Light (novel) =

Book by Laura Whitcomb

- Author: Laura Whitcomb
- Language: English
- Genre: Young-adult fiction, horror
- Publisher: Graphia
- Publication date: September 21, 2005
- Publication place: United States
- English publication date: 2005
- Media type: Print (Hardback)
- ISBN: 978-0-7569-6391-0 (first edition, hardback)

A Certain Slant of Light is a 2005 young adult horror novel by author Laura Whitcomb. The book was first published on September 21, 2005 by Houghton Mifflin Harcourt's Graphia imprint. Film rights for A Certain Slant of Light have been optioned by Summit Entertainment. The title is derived from the first line of "There's a certain Slant of light", a poem by Emily Dickinson.

== Synopsis ==
The book follows Helen, the ghost of a 27-year-old woman that has been dead for 130 years. The beginning of the story follows her through her life as a ghost, playing the role of invisible muse to a handful of artistically inclined people, lest she be cast back into her own personal hell. It is during her stay with English teacher Mr. Brown that Helen realizes that a student named Billy is aware of her presence. She later realizes that a spirit named James is inhabiting Billy's body after Billy overdosed on drugs. With the two being the only known beings of their type, James and Helen are quickly drawn to each other but are faced with the difficulties of residing within the bodies of other people.

== Characters ==
- Jenny: Jenny is a teenage girl under the strict rule of her religious parents. She has given up trying to reason with them and any attempts to have any feelings or life of her own. She, like Billy, has lost hope, and her emptiness makes her the perfect vessel for Helen.
- Helen: Helen is a young woman who died many years ago. She remembers pieces of her old life, bits about a child who seems to be important to her, and she also remembers an intense fear of water. When Helen meets James they begin to fall in love. James helps her remember her past by finding Jenny. Helen then uses her body as a vessel. Now that James and Helen are in real bodies again they can be together, but this comes at a cost. They quickly realize that there are consequences for their actions and that they must undo the wrong they have done.
- Billy: Teenager Billy has lost complete hope in ever having a normal life. High on drugs most of the time, he tries desperately to forget the night his father attacked his mother. The overwhelming emptiness he feels finally consumes him and he attempts suicide. His soulless body now becomes the perfect vessel for James, a young man killed during World War I.
- James: A young man killed during World War I after witnessing his friend's death during combat now resides in this world as light trapped on this plane for the guilt he feels over his friend's death. He has now found his vessel Billy, and through Billy he has found Helen.

== Reception ==
Critical reception for A Certain Slant of Light has been predominantly positive, with the ALA making it one of their book picks for 2006. Publishers Weekly and Booklist both praised Whitcomb's writing style, with Publishers Weekly calling it "poetic". Kirkus Reviews panned the novel, citing that it did not live up to its potential.
