= Kenneth Fields =

American poet and professor

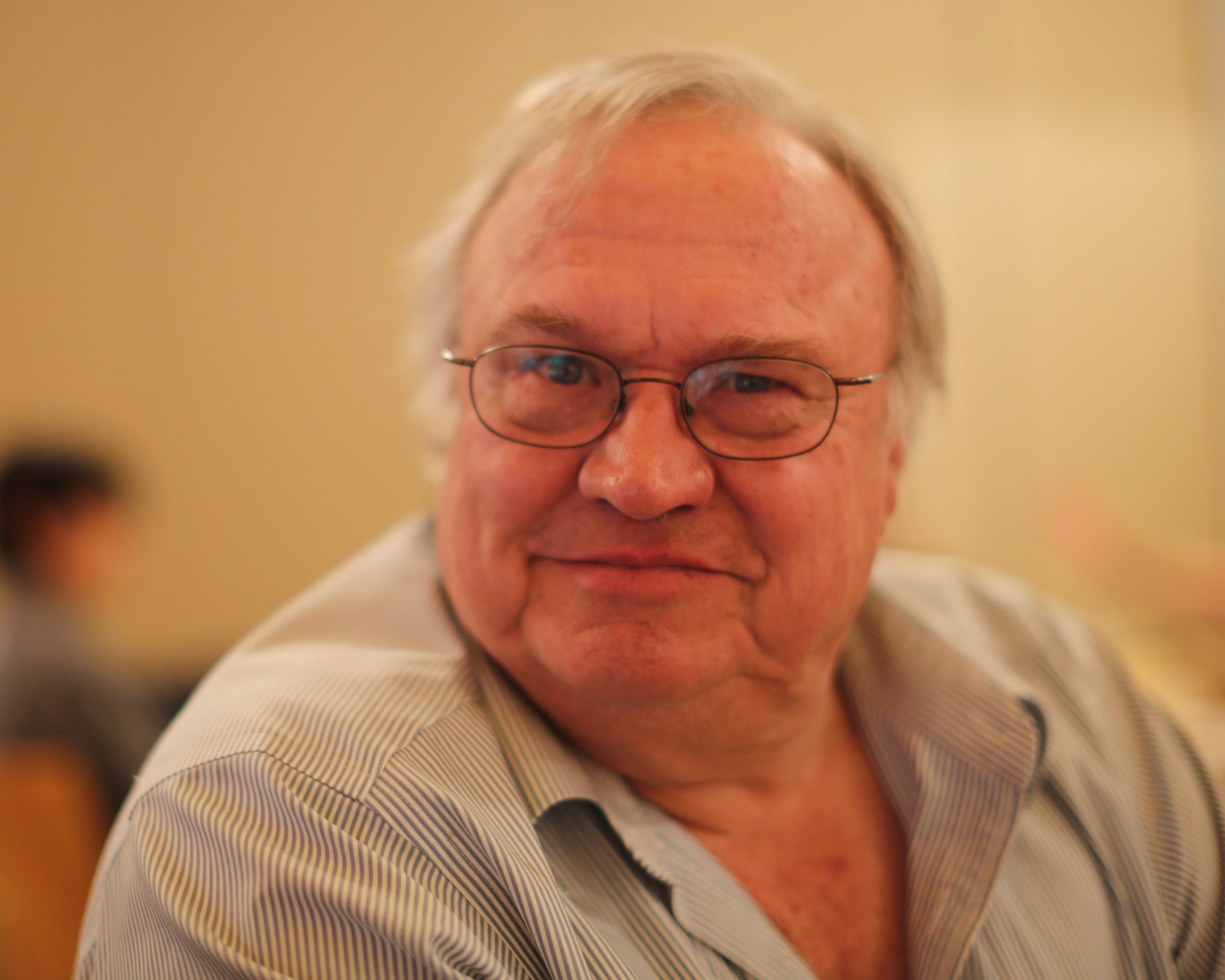
- Fields in 2012.
- Born: August 1 1939; Colorado City, Texas
- Died: December 6 2024
- Other name: Ken Fields
- Occupations: Poet, professor

Kenneth Fields (August 1 1939 – December 6 2023) was an American poet and a professor of creative writing at Stanford University. He had been on the faculty since 1967.

In 1964, Fields was inducted into the Stegner Fellowship, and later co-led the Stegner program as a professor. As of 2004, Fields taught the Advanced Poetry Writing Workshop for the Stanford Writing Fellows.

== Bibliography ==
Poetry

- The Other Walker
- Sunbelly
- Smoke
- The Odysseus Manuscripts
- Anemographia: A Treatise on the Wind'
- Classic Rough News
- Music from Another Room

Novels

- Father of Mercies

Anthologies

- Quest for Reality: An Anthology of Short Poems in English (1969), with Yvor Winters
