= Voyages (poem) =

Series of erotic poems by Hart Crane

Contained in Hart Crane's first collection of poems, White Buildings (1926), "Voyages" was composed across six years (1921–1926), with sections published as early as 1923. Containing one of Crane's most famous lyrics, "Voyages: II," this love-cycle of six poems was largely fueled by his reciprocated relationship with Emil Opffer, a Danish merchant mariner.
