= Alice Williamson =

Alice Williamson may refer to:

- Alice Motion (born 1984), British scientist, née Alice Williamson
- Alice Muriel Williamson (1858-1933), American-English author writing as A. M. Williamson
