= George Sibley Johns =

- Born: December 27, 1857; St. Charles, Missouri, US
- Died: July 16, 1941 (aged 83); Kirkwood, Missouri, US
- Education: Princeton University
- Occupation(s): Newspaper reporter, editor
- Title: Editor, St. Louis Post Dispatch
- Spouse: Minnehaha McDearmon
- Children: 7, including Orrick Glenday Johns

George Sibley Johns (1857–1941) was an American journalist, most notable as editor of the St. Louis Post-Dispatch.

== Biography ==
Johns was born in St. Charles, Missouri, to John Jay Johns and Jane Amanda Durfee. He was named after George Champlin Sibley, founder of Lindenwood College. Johns attended Princeton University, where he met Woodrow Wilson. They remained friends for the remainder of Wilson's life. Upon returning to St. Charles, George studied law briefly with his wife's uncle, Theodoric McDearmon. He and his brother, Glover Johns, started a weekly paper, the St. Charles Journal. Later, George went to work for Joseph Pulitzer at the St. Louis Post Dispatch, where he eventually became editor and was known as one of Pulitzer's "Fighting Editors".

Johns was married to Minnehaha McDearmon, with whom he had six sons, George McDearmon Johns, Horace Durfee Johns, John Hoyt Johns, Frederick Winston Johns, John Jay Johns and the poet and playwright Orrick Glenday Johns.

== Works ==
=== Books ===
- Joseph Pulitzer: Early Life in St. Louis and His Founding and Conduct of the Post-Dispatch up to 1883
- David Laroque: a drama in four acts (St. Louis, c1987)
- Philip Henson, the Southern Union spy. The hitherto unwritten record of a hero of the War of the Rebellion (St. Louis, Nixon-Jones Print. Co., 1887)

=== Articles ===
- "Joseph Pulitzer" Missouri Historical Review, January 1931, April 1931, July 1931 (Vol. 25, Nos. 2, 3 and 4), pp. 201–218, 404–420, 563–575.
