= Renascence (poem) =

1912 poem by Edna St. Vincent Millay

"Renascence" is a 1912 poem by Edna St. Vincent Millay, credited with introducing her to the wider world, and often considered one of her finest poems.

The poem is a 200+ line lyric poem, written in a first-person narrative, broadly encompassing the relationship of an individual to humanity and nature. The narrator is contemplating a vista from a mountaintop. Overwhelmed by nature, and thoughts of human suffering, the narrator empathetically feels the deaths of others, and feels pressed into a grave. Friendly rain brings the narrator back to joy in life—the rebirth, or "renascence", of the title.

== Publication history and importance to Millay's career ==
Millay's fame began in 1912 when the nineteen-year-old, encouraged by her mother, entered her poem "Renascence" in a poetry contest in The Lyric Year.

Millay had written and published poetry in St. Nicholas, a children's magazine, throughout her teen years, and had become a proficient poet. At some point, Millay wrote "Renascence" while looking out from the summit of Mt. Battie in Camden, Maine (where a plaque now commemorates the writing of the poem). The poem may have been influenced by Millay's childhood experience of nearly drowning. Her mother, Cora Millay, saw an announcement for a poetry contest sponsored by The Lyric Year, an annual volume of poetry, and encouraged Edna to enter the poem into the contest.

The poem was well received and was published in the annual volume, along with other best entries. On publication, Millay's poem was widely considered the best submission, and her eventual award of fourth place caused a major scandal. The first-place winner Orrick Johns was among those who felt that "Renascence" was the best poem, and stated that "the award was as much an embarrassment to me as a triumph." A second-prize winner offered Millay his $250 prize money.

The scandal brought Millay much attention, and "Renascence" was widely distributed and even taught to schoolchildren as an exemplar of American poetry. Millay used the publication to promote her own career, maintaining correspondence with editors and poets who congratulated her on her publication.

In the immediate aftermath of the Lyric Year controversy, wealthy arts patron Caroline B. Dow heard Millay reciting her poetry and playing the piano at the Whitehall Inn in Camden, Maine, and was so impressed that she offered to pay for Millay's education at Vassar College.

== Related work ==
A musical by Carmel Dean and Dick Scanlan, based on poetry of Edna St. Vincent Millay, and featuring Millay's "Renascence," premiered in October 2018.
