= Yvor Winters =

American poet (1900–1968)

- Born: October 17, 1900; Chicago, Illinois, U.S.
- Died: January 25, 1968 (aged 67)
- Education: University of Chicago; University of Colorado

Arthur Yvor Winters (October 17, 1900 – January 25, 1968) was an American poet and literary critic.

== Life ==
Winters was born in Chicago, Illinois and lived there until 1919 except for brief stays in Seattle and Pasadena, where his grandparents lived. He attended the University of Chicago for four-quarters in 1917–18, where he was a member of a literary circle that included Glenway Wescott, Elizabeth Madox Roberts and his future wife Janet Lewis. In the winter of 1918–19 he was diagnosed with tuberculosis and underwent treatment for two years in Santa Fe, New Mexico. During his recuperation he wrote and published some of his early poems. On his release from the sanitarium he taught in high schools in nearby mining towns. In 1923 Winters published one of his first critical essays, "Notes on the Mechanics of the Poetic Image," in the expatriate literary journal Secession. That same year he enrolled at the University of Colorado, where he achieved his BA and MA degrees in 1925.

In 1926, Winters married the poet and novelist Janet Lewis, also from Chicago and a fellow tuberculosis sufferer. After leaving Colorado he taught at the University of Idaho and then began the doctoral program at Stanford University. He remained at Stanford after receiving his PhD in 1934, becoming a member of the English faculty and living in Los Altos, California for the rest of his life. He retired from his Stanford position in 1966, two years before his death from throat cancer. His students included the poets Edgar Bowers, Turner Cassity, Thom Gunn, Donald Hall, Philip Levine, James L. McMichael, N. Scott Momaday, Helen Pinkerton, Robert Pinsky, John Matthias, Moore Moran, Roger Dickinson-Brown, Ann Stanford, and Robert Hass, the critic Gerald Graff, and the theater director and writer Herbert Blau. He was also a mentor to Donald Justice, J.V. Cunningham, and Bunichi Kagawa.

He edited the literary magazine Gyroscope with his wife from 1929 to 1931; and Hound & Horn from 1932 to 1934.

He was awarded the 1961 Bollingen Prize for Poetry for his Collected Poems.

== As modernist ==
Winters's early poetry appeared in small avant-garde magazines alongside work by writers like James Joyce and Gertrude Stein and was written in the modernist idiom; it was heavily influenced both by Native American poetry and by Imagism, being described as 'arriving late at the Imagist feast'. His essay "The Testament of a Stone" gives an account of his poetics during this early period. Although beginning his career as an admirer and imitator of the Imagist poets, Winters by the end of the 1920s had formulated a neo-classic poetics. Around 1930, he turned away from modernism and developed an Augustan style of writing, notable for its clarity of statement and its formality of rhyme and rhythm, with most of his poetry thereafter being in the accentual-syllabic form.

== As critic ==
Winters's critical style was comparable to that of F. R. Leavis, and in the same way he created a school of students (of mixed loyalty). His affiliations and proposed canon, however, were quite different: Edith Wharton's The Age of Innocence above any one novel by Henry James, Robert Bridges above T. S. Eliot, Charles Churchill above Alexander Pope, Fulke Greville and George Gascoigne above Sidney and Spenser, and he considered T. Sturge Moore and Elizabeth Daryush to be major poets. In his view, "a poem in the first place should offer us a new perception . . . bringing into being a new experience."

He attacked Romanticism, particularly in its American manifestations, and assailed Emerson's reputation as that of a sacred cow. His first book of poems, Diadems and Fagots, takes its title from one of Emerson's poems. In this he was probably influenced by Irving Babbitt. Winters was associated with the New Criticism.

Winters is best known for his argument attacking the "fallacy of imitative form":

"To say that a poet is justified in employing a disintegrating form in order to express a feeling of disintegration, is merely a sophistical justification for bad poetry, akin to the Whitmanian notion that one must write loose and sprawling poetry to 'express' the loose and sprawling American continent. In fact, all feeling, if one gives oneself (that is, one's form) up to it, is a way of disintegration; poetic form is by definition a means to arrest the disintegration and order the feeling; and in so far as any poetry tends toward the formless, it fails to be expressive of anything."

== Bibliography ==
- Diadems and Fagots (1921) poems
- The Immobile Wind (1921) poems
- The Magpie's Shadow (1922) poems
- Notes on the Mechanics of the Image (1923) in Secession magazine
- The Bare Hills (1927) poems
- The Proof (1930) poems
- The Journey and Other Poems (1931) poems
- Before Disaster (1934) poems
- Primitivism and Decadence: A Study of American Experimental Poetry Arrow Editions, New York, 1937
- Maule's Curse: Seven Studies in the History of American Obscurantism (1938)
- Poems (1940)
- The Giant Weapon (1943) poems
- The Anatomy of Nonsense (1943)
- Edwin Arlington Robinson (1946)
- In Defense of Reason (1947) collects Primitivism, Maule and Anatomy
- To the Holy Spirit (1947) poems
- Three Poems (1950)
- Collected Poems (1952, revised 1960)
- The Function of Criticism: Problems and Exercises (1957)
- On Modern Poets: Stevens, Eliot, Ransom, Crane, Hopkins, Frost (1959)
- The Early Poems of Yvor Winters, 1920–1928 (1966)
- Forms of Discovery: Critical and Historical Essays on the Forms of the Short Poem in English (1967)
- Uncollected Essays and Reviews (1976)
- The Collected Poems of Yvor Winters; with an introduction by Donald Davie (1978)
- Uncollected Poems 1919–1928 (1997)
- Uncollected Poems 1929–1957 (1997)
- Yvor Winters: Selected Poems (2003) edited by Thom Gunn

As editor

- Twelve Poets of the Pacific (1937)
- Selected Poems, by Elizabeth Daryush (1948); with a foreword by Winters
- Poets of the Pacific, Second Series (1949)
- Quest for Reality: An Anthology of Short Poems in English (1969); with, and with an introduction by, Kenneth Fields

== See also ==
- Yvor Winters's alternative canon of Elizabethan poetry
