= Malcolm Cowley =

American writer (1898–1989)

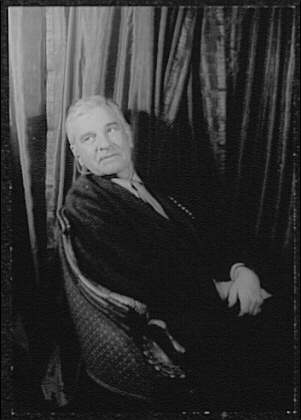
- Cowley, photographed by Carl Van Vechten, 1963
- Born: August 24, 1898; Belsano, Pennsylvania, U.S.
- Died: March 27, 1989 (aged 90); New Milford, Connecticut, U.S.
- Education: Harvard University
- Occupation: Writer

Malcolm Cowley (August 24, 1898 – March 27, 1989) was an American writer, editor, historian, poet, and literary critic. His best known works include his first book of poetry, Blue Juniata (1929), and his memoir, Exile's Return (1934; rev. 1951), written as a chronicler and fellow traveller of the Lost Generation and an influential editor and talent scout at Viking Press.

== Early life ==
Cowley was born August 24, 1898, in Belsano, Pennsylvania, to William Cowley and Josephine Hutmacher. Starting at age nine, he grew up in the East Liberty neighborhood of Pittsburgh, where his father, William, was a homeopathic doctor. Cowley attended the Shakespeare School and Peabody High School, where his boyhood friend Kenneth Burke was also a student. Cowley participated in Peabody's debate club and wrote poetry for its literary magazine, recognized with coverage in local newspapers like The Pittsburgh Post. Cowley graduated from Peabody in 1915, second in his class, and aided by a scholarship from the local Harvard Club, Cowley was accepted to Harvard College with enough credits to skip the introductory English classes.

Being on scholarship and matriculating from a public school put Cowley at a social disadvantage compared to wealthier students, wrote Gerald Howard in a 2025 biography of Cowley: "The more prosperous and socially advantaged Harvard students could...slide through their college life on charm and connections and 'gentleman's C's' or worse. But Cowley would need to be a scholarship boy during his years at Harvard to afford the tuition, which meant he had to apply himself academically and keep his grades high enough to renew his scholarship annually."

His studies at Harvard were interrupted when he joined the American Field Service during World War I to drive ambulances for the French army. He returned to Harvard in 1919 and became editor of The Harvard Advocate. He graduated with a B.A. in 1920.

== Life in Paris ==
Cowley was one of the many literary and artistic figures who migrated to Paris in the 1920s. He became one of the best-known chroniclers of the American expatriates in Europe, as he frequently spent time with writers like Ernest Hemingway, F. Scott Fitzgerald, John Dos Passos, Ezra Pound, Gertrude Stein, E. E. Cummings, Edmund Wilson, Erskine Caldwell, and others associated with American literary modernism. However, wrote Howard in 2025: "...his consistent admiration for traditional literary forms, for the practice of writing as an honest craft...and for literature as a richly human activity ran counter to the ideas that governed the literary avant-garde during the early years of the Modernist expansion."

In Blue Juniata, Cowley described these Americans who travelled abroad during the postwar period as a "wandering, landless, uprooted generation"; similarly Hemingway, claiming to have taken the phrase from Gertrude Stein, called them the "lost generation". This sense of uprootedness deeply affected Cowley's appreciation for the necessities of artistic freedom. It moreover informed his ideal of cosmopolitanism in contrast to the fervent nationalism(s) that had led to World War I. Cowley recounted his experiences in Exile's Return, writing, "our whole training was involuntarily directed toward destroying whatever roots we had in the soil, toward eradicating our local and regional peculiarities, toward making us homeless citizens of the world".

While Cowley associated with many American writers in Europe, the sense of admiration was not always mutual. Hemingway removed direct reference to Cowley in a later version of The Snows of Kilimanjaro, replacing his name with the description, "that American poet with a pile of saucers in front of him and a stupid look on his potato face talking about the Dada movement". John Dos Passos's private correspondence revealed the contempt he held for Cowley, but also the care writers took to hide their personal feelings in order to protect their careers once Cowley had become an editor of The New Republic. Regardless, Exile's Return was one of the first autobiographical texts to foreground the American expatriate experience. Despite not selling well during its first publication, it established Cowley as one of the most trenchant emissaries of the Lost Generation. Literary historian Van Wyck Brooks described Exile's Return as "an irreplaceable literary record of the most dramatic period in American literary history."

== Early career and involvement in politics ==
While in Paris, Cowley found himself drawn to the avant-garde sensibilities of Dada, and also, like many other intellectuals of the period, to Marxism. He travelled frequently between Paris and Greenwich Village in New York. Through these intersecting social circles came into close proximity, though he never officially joined, with the Communist Party USA. Cowley believed that the Communist Party was hostile to intellectuals and: "Nobody actually a Communist seemed to write good English prose."

In 1929, Cowley became an associate editor of the left-leaning magazine The New Republic, which he steered in "a resolutely communist direction" The same year, he translated and wrote a foreword to the 1913 French novel 'La Colline Inspirée', by Maurice Barrès. By the early 1930s, Cowley became increasingly involved in radical politics. In 1932, he joined Edmund Wilson, Mary Heaton Vorse, and Waldo Frank as union-sponsored observers of the miners' strikes in Kentucky. Their lives were threatened by the mines' owners, and Frank was badly beaten. When Exile's Return was first published in 1934, it put forth a distinctly Marxist interpretation of history and social struggle.

In 1935, Cowley helped to establish a leftist collective, The League of American Writers. Other notable members included Archibald MacLeish and Carl Van Doren. Appointed to its executive committee, Cowley became involved in numerous campaigns, including attempts to persuade the United States government to support the Republicans in the Spanish Civil War. He resigned in 1940, owing to concerns that the organization was too pro-Soviet.

In 1941, near the outset of the United States' involvement in World War II, President Franklin D. Roosevelt appointed Cowley's associate, poet and "popular front" interventionist Archibald MacLeish, as head of the War Department's Office of Facts and Figures (precursor to the Office of War Information). MacLeish recruited Cowley as an analyst. This decision resulted in anti-communist journalists such as Whittaker Chambers and Westbrook Pegler publicly exposing Cowley's left-wing sympathies. Cowley soon found himself in the crosshairs of congressman Martin Dies (D-Tex.) and the House Un-American Activities Committee. Dies accused Cowley of belonging to seventy-two communist or communist-front organizations. This number was certainly an exaggeration, but Cowley had no recourse to deny it. MacLeish soon came under pressure from J. Edgar Hoover and the Federal Bureau of Investigation to dismiss Cowley. In January 1942, MacLeish sent his reply that the FBI needed a course of instruction in history. "Don't you think it would be a good thing if all investigators could be made to understand that Liberalism is not only not a crime but actually the attitude of the President of the United States and the greater part of his Administration?", he said. Nevertheless, Cowley resigned two months later.

== Editorial career and academia ==
In 1944, having been more or less silenced politically, Cowley began a career as a literary advisor, editor, and talent scout at Viking Press. He was hired to work on the Portable Library series, which had started in 1943 with As You Were: A Portable Library of American Prose and Poetry Assembled for Members of the Armed Forces and Merchant Marine. In its inception, the Portable Library was an anthology of paperback reprints that could be mass-produced cheaply and marketed to military personnel. It also emphasized an American literary tradition that could be construed as patriotic during wartime. Yet Cowley was able to steer the series toward what were, in his esteem, underappreciated writers such as William Faulkner.

He first set out to edit The Portable Hemingway (1944). At the time, Hemingway was largely considered to be a sparse and simplistic writer. Cowley departed from this perception in his introductory essay, claiming instead that Hemingway could be read as tortured and submerged. This revaluation remains the dominant critical opinion today. Literary critic Mark McGurl argues that Hemingway's tip-of-the-iceberg style has become one of the most emulated in twentieth-century American prose, his name all but synonymous with the "pathos of understatement" and "the value of craft as represented by the practice of multiple revision".

The Portable Hemingway sold so well that Cowley was able to convince Viking to publish a Portable Faulkner in 1946. William Faulkner was, at the time, slipping into literary obscurity. By the 1930s, he was working as a Hollywood screenwriter and in danger of seeing his works go out of print. Cowley again argued for a dramatic revaluation of Faulkner's position in American letters, enlisting him as an honorary member of the Lost Generation. Robert Penn Warren called The Portable Faulkner the "great watershed" moment for Faulkner's reputation, and many scholars view Cowley's essay as having resuscitated Faulkner's career. Faulkner won a Nobel Prize in 1949. He later said, "I owe Malcolm Cowley the kind of debt no man could ever repay".

Cowley then published a revised edition of Exile's Return in 1951. The revisions downplayed some of the more overtly Marxist tenets, and more obviously emphasized the return of the exile as a necessary step toward reestablishing a nation's solidarity: "the old pattern of alienation and reintegration, or departure and return, that is repeated in scores of European myths and continually re-embodied in life", Cowley wrote. This time the book sold much better. Cowley also published a Portable Hawthorne (1948), The Literary Tradition (1954), and edited a new edition of Leaves of Grass (1959), by Walt Whitman. These were followed by Black Cargoes, A History of the Atlantic Slave Trade (1962), Fitzgerald and the Jazz Age (1966), Think Back on Us (1967), Collected Poems (1968), Lesson of the Masters (1971) and A Second Flowering (1973).

Cowley taught creative writing at the college-level beginning in the 1950s. Among his students were Larry McMurtry, Peter S. Beagle, Wendell Berry, as well as Ken Kesey, whose One Flew Over the Cuckoo's Nest (1962) Cowley helped publish at Viking. Writing workshops were a recent development at the time (the Iowa Writers' Workshop was founded in 1936), yet by midcentury their proliferation was of note for both writers and publishers. Cowley taught also at Yale, Michigan, Minnesota, Washington, California at Irvine and Berkeley, and even the prestigious Stegner Fellowship at Stanford, among other places, but he seldom maintained a full-time teaching appointment. Literary and cultural critic Benjamin Kirbach argues that this flitting back-and-forth between universities and the publishing industry allowed Cowley to reconcile his cosmopolitan ideal within the constraints of the academy. Kirbach writes: "Cowley's itinerancy—his seemingly effortless movement between universities and the publishing industry, between writers individual and collective—played a crucial role in institutionalizing [literary] modernism" in the twentieth century.

As an editorial consultant to Viking Press, he pushed for the publication of Jack Kerouac's On the Road. Cowley's work anthologizing 28 Fitzgerald short stories and editing a reissue of Tender Is the Night, restructured based on Fitzgerald's notes, both in 1951, were key to reviving Fitzgerald's reputation as well, and his introduction to Sherwood Anderson's Winesburg, Ohio, written in the early 1960s, is said to have had a similar effect on Anderson's reputation. Other works of literary and critical importance include Eight More Harvard Poets (1923), A Second Flowering: Works & Days of the Lost Generation (1973), And I Worked at the Writer's Trade (1978), and The Dream of the Golden Mountains: Remembering the 1930s (1980). And I Worked won a 1980 U.S. National Book Award in the one-year category Autobiography. (Note: This was the 1980 award for paperback Autobiography. From 1980 to 1983 in National Book Award history there were dual hardcover and paperback awards in most categories, and multiple nonfiction subcategories. Most of the paperback award-winners were reprints, including this one.)

When The Portable Malcolm Cowley (Donald Faulkner, editor) was published in 1990, the year after Cowley's death, Michael Rogers wrote in Library Journal: "Though a respected name in hardcore literary circles, in general the late Cowley is one of the unsung heroes of 20th-century American literature. Poet, critic, Boswell of the Lost Generation of which he himself was a member, savior of Faulkner's dwindling reputation, editor of Kerouac's On the Road, discoverer of John Cheever, Cowley knew everybody and wrote about them with sharp insight. . . . . Cowley's writings on the great books are as important as the books themselves . . . . All American literature collections should own this."

To the end, Cowley remained a humanitarian in the world of letters. He wrote writer Louise Bogan in 1941, "I'm almost getting pathologically tender-hearted. I have been caused so much pain by reviewers and political allrightniks of several shades of opinion that I don't want to cause pain to anybody."

== Marriages and death ==
Cowley married artist Peggy Baird; they were divorced in 1931. His second wife was Muriel Maurer. Together they had one son, Robert William Cowley, who is an editor and military historian.

He died of a heart attack March 27, 1989.

== Correspondence ==
- Malcolm, Cowley, The Long Voyage: Selected Letters of Malcolm Cowley, 1915–1987, Cambridge, MA: Harvard University Press, 2014
- Paul, Jay (1989). The selected correspondence of Kenneth Burke and Malcolm Cowley, 1915-1981. University of California Press. ISBN 978-0-520-06899-5.
- Malcolm Cowley, The Faulkner-Cowley File: Letters and Memories, 1944-1962, New York: Viking, 1966

== See also ==
- List of ambulance drivers during World War I
- Letters to Cowley from Yvor Winters in The Selected Letters of Yvor Winters, ed. R. L. Barth, Athens, OH: Swallow Press/Ohio UP, 2000.
