= Stargazer =

Stargazer may refer to:

- an observational astronomer, particularly an amateur. Also see Amateur astronomy.

== Aerospace ==
- Stargazer (aircraft), a Lockheed L-1011 airliner used to launch the Pegasus rocket
- Orbiting Astronomical Observatory 2, nicknamed Stargazer, the first successful space telescope
- Star Gazers, a five-minute astronomy show on public television

== Fictional media ==
- Mobile Suit Gundam SEED C.E. 73: Stargazer, a storyline in the series Gundam SEED Destiny
- Stargazer, a werewolf tribe in the game Werewolf: The Apocalypse
- Stargazer (novel), a book in the Evernight series by Claudia Gray
- Stargazer (Patrick Carman), a book in the Land of Elyon series by Patrick Carman
- The Stargazer, a fictional character in the epilogue of Mass Effect 3 played by Buzz Aldrin
- Star Trek: Stargazer, a series of Star Trek novels
- Commander Stargazer, the leader of the Silverhawks

== Music ==
=== Artists ===
- The Stargazers (vocal ensemble)
- The Stargazers (band)
- Stargazer (record producer)

=== Songs ===
- "Stargazer" (Siouxsie and the Banshees song)
- "Stargazer" (The Tea Party song)
- "Stargazer" (Rainbow song), also covered by Dream Theater, Lana Lane and Týr
- "Stargazer", a song by Rx Bandits on the album Gemini, Her Majesty
- "Stargazer", a song by Mother Love Bone on the album Apple
- "Stargazer", a song by Neil Diamond on the album Beautiful Noise
- "Stargazers", a song by Nightwish on the album Oceanborn
- "Stargazers", a song by Avantasia on the album Angel of Babylon
- "Stargazer", a song by Filipino band Sponge Cola
- "Stargazer", a song by Kingdom Come on the album In Your Face
- "Stargazer", a song from the Local Hero soundtrack by Mark Knopfler

=== Albums and EPs ===
- Stargazer (Dave Douglas album), 1997 album by trumpeter Dave Douglas
- Stargazer (Moodring album)
- Stargazer (EP), 2020 EP by JO1
- Stargazer, a 1971 album by Shelagh McDonald
- Stargazer, 1979 album by Peter Brown
- Stargazer, 1980 album by Armen Donelian
- Stargazer, 1999 EP by Deepsky
- Stargazer, 2006 album by Shane Alexander
- Stargazer, 2012 album by Black Majesty
- Stargazer (Marti Pellow album), 2021

== Other uses ==
- Stargazer (fish), a fish from one of eight genera noted for its upward-pointing eyes
- Lilium 'Stargazer', a lily flower
- Star Gazers' Stone, marks the spot of an observatory used by Charles Mason and Jeremiah Dixon
- Hyundai Stargazer, a minivan
- Stargazer, the initial product of Tele-TV, a video on demand service
