= Moodring (band) =

American metal band

- Origin: Orlando, Florida
- Genres: Nu metal; alternative metal
- Years active: 2020–present
- Labels: UNFD; SharpTone
- Members: Hunter Young; Sean Dolich; Kalan Blehm; Lindy Harter
- Website: moodringnu.com

Moodring is an American alternative metal band from Orlando, Florida.

The band was formed in late 2020 and consists of singer and guitarist Hunter Young, guitarist Sean Dolich, bassist Kalan Blehm, and drummer Lindy Harter. Besides Moodring, the musicians are also active in bands such as Attila, Culture Killer, and Graveview. On March 5, 2021, the band self-released the EP Showmetherealyou. In August 2021, Moodring was signed by the Australian record label UNFD, which re-released the EP.

Subsequently, the band recorded their debut album, Stargazer, released in June 2022. They were assisted by producer Austin Coupe. Their second album, death fetish, came out on March 27, 2026 via SharpTone Records.

== Musical style and Influences ==
Moodring has described as alternative metal and nu metal. Their influences include bands such as Deftones, Glassjaw, Orgy, Finger Eleven, The Smashing Pumpkins, Korn, Static-X, Fear Factory, Spineshank, Staind, Nine Inch Nails, Seo Taiji, Pleymo, Dir En Grey, Emmure, Failure, Filter, Pitchshifter, Radiohead, Sepultura, the GazettE and Maximum the Hormone.

== Discography ==
=== Studio albums ===
- Stargazer (2022)
- death fetish (2026)

=== EPs ===
- Showmetherealyou (2021)
- Your Light Fades Away (2023)

== Members ==
- Hunter Young – vocals, guitar
- Kalan Adam – bass guitar
- Lindy Harter – drums, backing vocals
- Sean Dolich – guitar, backing vocals
