= Seven Circles =

Studio album by The Tea Party
- Released: August 17, 2004
- Studio: Orange Studios (Toronto), Plantation Studios (Haiku Hill, Maui) and Metalworks Studios (Mississauga, Ontario)
- Genre: Hard rock
- Length: 45:09
- Label: EMI Music Canada; InsideOut Music Europe
- Producer: Jeff Martin, Gavin Brown, and Bob Rock

The Tea Party chronology
The Interzone Mantras (2001)	Seven Circles (2004)	Live From Australia (2012)

Professional ratings
Review scores
Source	Rating
AllMusic	3.5/5 stars

Seven Circles is the seventh studio album by Canadian band The Tea Party, released in 2004. It was the band's last album prior to their split in 2005. The album continues the style of the band's two previous offerings (The Interzone Mantras in 2001 and Triptych in 1999) by combining world music influences with rock instrumentation and electronic studio techniques. The album is also one of the band's most positive sounding records, forsaking the dystopian imagery and moody lyrics of past albums, and including several ballads that border on love-song territory. This change in focus has led to both praise and criticism from fans.

The album is dedicated to the memory of Steve Hoffman, the late manager of The Tea Party, who died of lung cancer in October 2003. Track 4, "Oceans" was written in his honour, with a promotional single released in May 2005 The Tea Party hoped to bring more attention to the Steven Hoffman Fund.

The album is also notable for containing the song "Empty Glass", which continues the saga of Major Tom from the work of David Bowie, Peter Schilling, and others.

Seven Circles marks the first time that Jeff Martin has duetted with another artist; "Wishing you would Stay" features fellow Canadian vocalist Holly McNarland, as a counterpoint to Martin's baritone.

The album debuted at number 5 on the Canadian Album Chart, selling 7,600 copies in its first week. On November 4, 2004, the album was certified gold in Canada. Seven Circles also received a nomination for Rock Album of the Year at the 2005 Juno Awards.

== Track listing ==
All songs written by The Tea Party, except tracks 6, 7, and 8 written by The Tea Party and Bob Rock.

Seven Circles track listing
No.	Title	Length
1.	"Writing's on the Wall"	2:40
2.	"Stargazer"	4:11
3.	"One Step Closer Away"	3:47
4.	"Oceans"	4:35
5.	"Luxuria"	4:25
6.	"Overload"	3:53
7.	"Coming Back Again"	4:43
8.	"The Watcher"	4:16
9.	"Empty Glass"	3:15
10.	"Wishing You Would Stay"	4:11
11.	"Seven Circles"	5:04

=== Canadian tour limited edition bonus disc ===
1. "Overload" – 4:33
2. "Writing's on the Wall" – 3:02
3. "Oceans" – 5:07

== Singles ==
- "Writing's on the Wall"
- "Stargazer"
- "Oceans"

== Personnel ==
=== Production ===
- Produced by Gavin Brown and Jeff Martin (Tracks 1, 2, 3, 4, 5, 9, 10, 11), Bob Rock (Tracks 6, 7, 8)
- Recorded at Orange Studios (Toronto) and Plantation Studios (Haiku Hill, Maui)
- Engineered by Eric Ratz and Eric Helmkamp
- Mixed by Randy Staub
- Mixed at The Warehouse Studio, Vancouver
- Special thanks: David Giammarco

=== Additional musicians ===
- Track 10
  - Holly McNarland (backing vocals)

=== Design ===
- Art direction: Stuart Chatwood and Antoine Moonen
- Layout and design by Antoine Moonen

== Charts ==
Chart performance for Seven Circles
Chart (2004)	Peak position
Australian Albums (ARIA)	18
