= The Dark Hills Divide =

2005 novel by Patrick Carman

- The Land of Elyon - Book 1 - The Dark Hills Divide
- Author: Patrick Carman
- Illustrator: Brad Weinman
- Language: English
- Series: The Land of Elyon
- Genre: Fantasy
- Publisher: Scholastic Corporation
- Publication date: 2005
- Publication place: United States
- Media type: Print (Hardback & Paperback)
- Pages: 252
- Followed by: Beyond the Valley of Thorns

The Dark Hills Divide is a (2005) children's fantasy and mystery novel by American author Patrick Carman. It is the first book in The Land of Elyon series, which focuses on the adventures of Alexa Daley, who is the daughter of Mr. Daley, the mayor of fictional Lathbury.

== Summary ==
12-year-old Alexa Daley is spending another summer in Bridewell with her father, the Mayor of Lathbury. The book starts by Alexa going on a walk through the streets of Bridewell with her adventurer friend Thomas Warvold. During the stroll, Warvold tells Alexa a fable that he heard on one of his far-off journeys. When the fable is finished, Alexa finds that Warvold is dead.

The following chapter turns to an event that happened before Warvold's death. Alexa and her father, James Daley, are on the road to Bridewell from their hometown of Lathbury. During the ride, Alexa insists that the story of the walls that surround Bridewell and the cities around it be told to her. The story is of an orphan named Thomas Warvold who wandered off from his hometown on his thirteenth birthday. For years, no one knew or cared where he'd gone. After twenty years, he eventually persuaded others to join him in a place most everyone believed was haunted, dark and dangerous. But, after some time, more and more people became convinced that the place was safe to live in. The valley where Warvold settled, which is now called Lunenburg, filled up to capacity and provided no room for growth. One end of the valley was the already established town of Ainsworth. Because of the problem, Warvold decided to expand. He would build a walled road out into the unknown, and at the end of it, he would build a new town. Only, who would build the wall? People of Lunenburg were afraid of the dangers outside. So Warvold decided to borrow convicts from Ainsworth, branded with a C for criminal, to do the hard labor. There was but one condition: After ten years, Warvold could return the convicts to Ainsworth, no questions asked. In three years, the convicts built the wall to what is now Bridewell and two more walled roads were started. Over the next several years the walled roads to Turlock and Lathbury were finished, completing the kingdom. In the middle of the story, Alexa and her father have a race with a mailman named Silas Hardy whom they meet on the road.

Upon arriving at the Renny Lodge (Named after Warvold's wife Renny Warvold), Alexa is greeted by Ganesh, the mayor of Turlock and by Warvold himself. After going up to her room, Alexa uses a spyglass, stolen from her mother, to look over the walls from her window. She is interrupted by Pervis Kotcher, head guard of the Turlock gate, who takes the spyglass from her. Fortunately, Warvold comes just then (Pervis hides the spyglass) and takes Alexa for a walk which, as shown in the beginning of the book, ends in his death. Before getting help, Alexa takes a silver key from the locket around Warvold's neck. During Warvold's funeral Alexa sneaks to the library. While there, she drifts off to sleep in her favorite nook. She is awakened by Pervis, who breaks her spyglass before returning it. At dinner, Nicolas (Warvold's son) tells Alexa about his mother Renny's interest in the art of Jocastas. That day, when Alexa is in her favorite nook again, she discovers that the medallions which the library cats Sam and Pepper have hanging from their collars, have Jocastas etched on them. Alexa is successful in looking at Sam's but receives a nasty scratch when she attempts to look at Pepper's.

Later on, Alexa uses the silver key to open a passageway hidden behind her favorite nook. At the end of the passageway, outside the wall, Alexa is greeted by a short man named Yipes, who seems to have been waiting for her. Alexa follows Yipes up Mount Norwood and comes to a glowing pond. Inside the pond, she finds a green stone. Once she puts it in her leather pouch, Yipes takes her to his house. Waking up from her sleep, Alexa finds that she has the ability to talk to animals. Darius, a wolf separated from his family, leads her to a tunnel under the walled road between Lathbury and Bridewell. At the end of the tunnel, Alexa discovers that the convicts of Ainsworth inhabit The Dark Hills. Once she is back outside, a rabbit named Malcolm takes her to the forest king Ander, a grizzly bear. Ander tells Alexa that she can talk to animals as long as she has the green stone with her and is outside the walls. He also tells her that the convicts living in The Dark Hills are planning to attack and take over Bridewell. The leader of the convicts is someone the convicts call Sebastian, an escaped convict posing as a citizen of Bridewell. At the meeting, Alexa meets Murphy (Squirrel), Beaker (Raccoon), Henry (Badger), Picardy (Female Black Bear), Boone (Bobcat), Odessa (Darius's wife) and Sherwin (Darius's son).

The day after the meeting, Alexa is sent back through the passageway she came from. The green stone's powers start fading. Back in the library, she learns that Sam and Pepper are traitors. At her arrival, Silas, who Mr. Daley promotes as his personal mailman, asks her where she had gone. Alexa lies and says she was playing a game. During lunch, Pervis returns drunk from his holiday and is locked up. Later that day, Alexa visits Pervis in his cell and the two play a game of chess, in which the winner gets to ask 5 questions. Pervis is the victor and asks Alexa about the night of Warvold's death and her disappearance. Feeling that she could trust him, Alexa tells him about everything. The next morning, Alexa also tells her father about her disappearance and the plot against Bridewell. Hearing this, Mr. Daley calls for a meeting. During the meeting, the group, which consists of Mr. Daley, Grayson (Librarian), Nicolas, Ganesh, Pervis, Silas and Alexa, come up with a plan to defend Bridewell and release Pervis. While looking at one of Warvold's favorite books, Alexa finds a note from Warvold about Sebastian telling her to read page 194.

Having figured out who Sebastian was, Alexa and Murphy go back to the passageway in the library way and come face to face with Ganesh. At first, Alexa hits him in the knee with a fire poker she took from the smoking room, but Ganesh takes it from her and kicks her in the ribs. After a wild chase, Ganesh admits that he was the one who poisoned Warvold and that he was Sebastian. The confession is followed by a fight in which Ganesh dies. Yipes and Darius kill the evil convict. Yipes goes to the city to find help, and Alexa is rescued by her father and Pervis, who take her back above ground. The stone's power fades completely.

The convicts attack Bridewell at midnight but eventually fail. In the epilogue: All the walls are taken down except for the wall around Bridewell.

- The plot above does not contain some details and events. The book is narrated from Alexa's point of view

== Characters ==
- Alexa Daley: the book's protagonist; the young daughter of James Daley, the Mayor of Lathbury.
- James Daley: Alexa's father, the Mayor of Lathbury
- Thomas Warvold: the founder of the fictional Lunenburg, which eventually is connected via walled roads to the cities of Bridewell, Lathbury, and Turlock.
- Pervis Kotcher: the head guard of the Turlock gate
- Nicolas Warvold: Renny Warvold's son
- Grayson: the librarian
- Yipes: A little man who lives outside the wall
- Pepper and Sam:the two cats that live in the library
- Malcom: A rabbit that introduces Alexa to Ander
- Ander: the king of the forest; he is a bear
- Murphy: the courageous squirrel that accompanies Alexa on most of her journey
- Darius: a wolf, he was separated from his family when the wall was built
- Odessa:Darius' wife
- Sherwin: Darius' son

== Books in this series ==
- The Dark Hills Divide (Book 1)
- Beyond the Valley of Thorns (Book 2)
- The Tenth City (Book 3)
- Into the Mist (Prequel)
- Stargazer (Patrick Carman) (Book 4)
