= Hyundai Motor Manufacturing Indonesia =

Automotive manufacturing plant in Indonesia

PT Hyundai Motor Manufacturing Indonesia
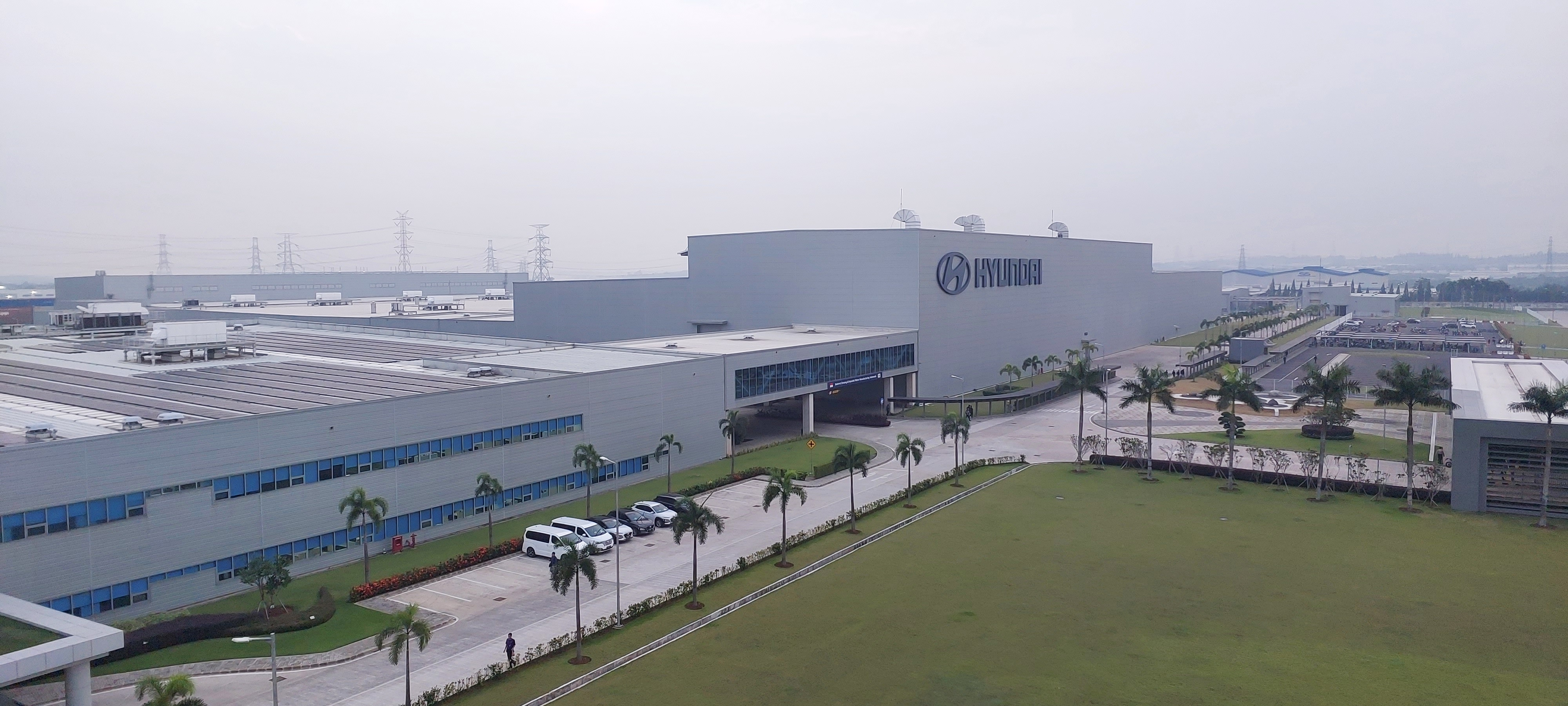
- Built: November 2019 – 2021
- Operated: 2021; 5 years ago
- Location: Cikarang, Bekasi Regency, West Java, Indonesia
- Coordinates: 6.403313°S 107.188888°E
- Industry: Automotive
- Products: Automobiles
- Employees: 2,000
- Area: 77.6 ha (192 acres)
- Owner: Hyundai Motor Company
- Website: www.hyundai.com/id

PT Hyundai Motor Manufacturing Indonesia (HMMI) is an automobile manufacturing plant located in Cikarang, Bekasi Regency, West Java, Indonesia. The plant and a separate sales company, PT Hyundai Motors Indonesia (HMID) are wholly owned subsidiaries of Hyundai Motor Company.

HMMI replaced the role of the locally owned Hyundai Indonesia Motor (renamed to Handal Indonesia Motor since November 2020), which held rights to assemble Hyundai cars in Indonesia since 1996, while HMID replaced the role of Hyundai Mobil Indonesia (HMI), the locally owned distributor of Hyundai cars in Indonesia from 1999 to 2021.

The plant is built in a 77.6 ha (192 acres) land in Cikarang and has been operated since the second half of 2021 with the annual capacity of 150,000. Half of the output will be exported to the neighbouring countries in Southeast Asia. A total of US$1.55 billion (Rp 21.7 trillion) will be invested to the plant along with the future product developments until 2030.

The HMMI plant has engine, outfitting, painting, press and car body factories, Mobility Innovation Center (which houses the Research and Development team), and also among others. It is also characterized by the application of various eco-friendly methods. Some of the plant's electricity is produced with solar power generation facilities, and volatile organic compounds were minimized by the water-soluble painting method. Furthermore, air pollution reduction facilities were used to reduce air pollution and heat loss was minimized by applying far-infrared ovens to the painting process.

== Models ==
=== Current models ===
| Model | Indonesian introduction | Current model | | Current production status |
| Model | Indonesian introduction | Introduction (model code) | Update/facelift | Current production status |
|---|---|---|---|---|
Sedan
| Ioniq 6 | 2023 | 2023 (CE) | — | Imported from South Korea |
SUV/crossover
| Venue | 2025 | 2025 (QXi) | — | Imported from India |
| Creta | 2022 | 2022 (SU2) | 2025 | Assembled in Indonesia |
| Kona Electric | 2020 | 2024 (SX2) | — | Assembled in Indonesia |
| Tucson | 2004 | 2024 (NX4) | — | Imported from South Korea |
| Ioniq 5 | 2022 | 2022 (NE) | — | Assembled in Indonesia |
| Ioniq 9 | 2026 | 2026 (ME1) | — | Imported from South Korea |
| Santa Fe | 2001 | 2024 (MX5) | — | Assembled in Indonesia |
| Palisade | 2020 | 2025 (LX3) | — | Imported from South Korea |
MPV
| Stargazer | 2022 | 2022 (KS) | 2025 (renamed to Stargazer Cartenz) | Assembled in Indonesia |
| Neira | 2026 | 2026 (KY) | – | Assembled in Indonesia Rebadged from Kia Carens EV |
| Staria | 2021 | 2021 (US4) | 2026 | Imported from South Korea |

=== Former models ===
- Hyundai Accent/Excel
- Hyundai Atoz
- Hyundai Avega/Grand Avega
- Hyundai Azera/Grandeur
- Hyundai Coupé
- Hyundai Elantra
- Hyundai Getz
- Hyundai H-1/Grand Starex
- Hyundai H-100/Arya H-100
- Hyundai i10/Grand i10
- Hyundai i20
- Hyundai Ioniq Electric
- Hyundai Kona
- Hyundai Matrix
- Hyundai Sonata
- Hyundai Trajet

== See also ==
- List of Hyundai Motor Company manufacturing facilities
