= Ghost in the Machine (novel) =

2000 novel by Patrick Carman

- Author: Patrick Carman
- Publisher: Scholastic Press
- Publication date: October 1, 2009
- ISBN: 9780545075701
- Preceded by: Skeleton Creek
- Followed by: The Crossbones

Ghost in the Machine is a children's horror/mystery novel by Patrick Carman, first published in 2009. It is the second book of the Skeleton Creek series, which is followed by three sequels: The Crossbones (2010), The Raven (2011), and The Phantom Room (2014). Like the other books in the series, it includes links and passwords to online videos which form an essential part of the plot.

== Plot ==
Ghost in the Machine picks up where Skeleton Creek left off, with Ryan and Sarah trapped in the Dredge. They escape and return home, after finding out about the Crossbones, a secret society that protects the Dredge. Ryan learns that his father, Paul McCray, is one of the last ones alive. When Sarah and Ryan return home they attempt to find out as much as they can about the Crossbones. This includes, spying on Ryan's dad, and encounters with Old Joe Bush, the horrifying ghost of the Dredge. In the end, Ryan and Sarah discover that the Dredge is filled with millions of dollars' worth of gold and that Henry is really insane and has been disguising himself as Old Joe Bush.

== Reception ==
Booklist's Courtney Jones noted that "in the first book, readers could get by without seeing the supplemental videos on Sarah's website, but in this go-round, the story suffers without them". Jones critiqued the plot and its ending, but considered this novel to be "a good read".
