= Skeleton Creek (novel) =

2009 novel by Patrick Carman

- Author: Patrick Carman
- Language: English
- Publication date: 2009

Skeleton Creek is a 2009 children's horror mystery novel by Patrick Carman, the first of a continuing series. The second is Ghost in the Machine (published in 2009), the third is The Crossbones (published in 2010), the fourth is The Raven (published in 2011), and the fifth is The Phantom Room (published in 2014).

== Synopsis ==
The story takes place in a small town called Skeleton Creek, which was formerly a gold and silver mining town. It is haunted by the ghost of "Old Joe Bush", a man who died in an accident on the Dredge, a large mining machine. Two youths in the town, Ryan McCray and Sarah Fincher, attempt to investigate the dredge and its ghost, while being closely watched by their parents and Ranger Bonner who are trying to keep the two separated after Ryan breaks his leg on the Dredge which leads to Sarah and Ryan not being able to communicate with each other at all. A video series, starring Sarah, also goes along with the novel, which shows trips to the Dredge and ghost sightings such as Old Joe Bush.

== Pre-release ==
Prior to the release of Skeleton Creek, a conspiracy website (SkeletonCreekIsReal.com) was created, questioning whether the videos and journal entries were actual events. The basis of the website is that the creator found a hidden directory on Patrick Carman's website, which contained files of videos. The creator uses these videos to determine that the events in Skeleton Creek happened in the real town of Sumpter, Oregon. The site has a blog where the creator talks about findings, and videos where he posts things such as the videos he finds on Patrick Carman's website, analysis of those videos, a trip to the Dredge and promotion for The Raven, the fourth book in the series. As of August 2011, no blog entries have been made, and the last video was posted in November 2010. Even though it is considered abandoned, updates to the site are made, such as new advertisements for Patrick Carman's other projects. Patrick Carman created the website to promote the book and its sequels. One of these websites is called Sarahfincher.com and it accompanies the book. It is filled with videos that may be spooky for young children. To watch a video the users must reach a point in the book that has a password. Many of the passwords contain gibberish that makes the passwords hard to guess. The videos are made, looking like they are only made for Ryan, and many people enjoy playing along.

== Awards ==
- 2011 New Mexico Land of Enchantment
  - Short List
    - 2011: Skeleton Creek
- Children's Book Council nominee
  - 2010: The Crossbones
- Pennsylvania Young Reader's Choice Awards
  - 2010–2011: Skeleton Creek
- Delaware Diamonds Booklist
  - 2010–2011: Skeleton Creek
- Oregon Battle of the Books List
  - 2010–2011: Skeleton Creek
