= Patrick Carman =

American writer (born 1966)

- Born: Patrick Carman; February 27, 1966 (age 60); Salem, Oregon, U.S.
- Occupations: Novelist; short story writer; screenwriter
- Writing career
- Genres: Young adult, fantasy, science fiction, children's literature
- Notable works: Skeleton Creek Saga, The Land of Elyon Series, Atherton Series, Atherton Thirteen Days to Midnight, and Elliot's Park Series
- Website: www.patrickcarman.com

Patrick Carman (born February 27, 1966, in Salem, Oregon) is an American writer and a graduate of Willamette University.

Carman's first book, The Dark Hills Divide, was published in 2005 The book, and the subsequent books in the same series (The Land of Elyon), were all New York Times bestsellers. The Land of Elyon has been translated into over twenty languages. The series was nominated for many state and national awards.

Carman followed the five-book Elyon series with the Atherton trilogy, which was shortlisted for the Texas Bluebonnet. Over two dozen books followed across middle grade and YA, including award-winning bestsellers Skeleton Creek, Floors, Pulse, Dark Eden, and Fizzopolis.

Carman is a public speaker who presents at national events throughout the year including the National Book Festival, the LA Book Festival, and the School Library Journal Summit. He has also spoken to over a million students at 2500+ schools across the country. On March 5, 2011, Patrick Carman gave a TED talk about 21st-Century literacy. He started an annual event in his own hometown, Walla Walla Kids Read, as a blueprint for literacy in rural communities.

== Awards ==
- Texas Bluebonnet Award master list
  - 2020: Mr. Gedrick and Me
- Parents Choice Award, US
  - 2015: Floors
- Rhode Island Children's Book Award, Nominee
  - 2015: Floors
- Official Selection, Story Lab Summer Reading Program, UK
  - 2015: Floors
- 2011 New Mexico Land of Enchantment
  - 2011: Skeleton Creek
  - 2008: The Dark Hills Divide
  - 2008-2009: The Dark Hills Divide
- Children's Book Council nominee
  - 2010: The Crossbones
  - 2010: Thirteen Days to Midnight
- YALSA Quick Picks for Reluctant Readers list
  - 2011: Thirteen Days to Midnight
- Pennsylvania Young Reader's Choice Awards
  - 2010-2011: Skeleton Creek
- Delaware Diamonds Booklist
  - 2010-2011: Skeleton Creek
- Oregon Battle of the Books List
  - 2010-2011: Skeleton Creek
  - 2008-2009: The Dark Hills Divide
  - 2008-2009: Atherton: The House of Power
- Truman Award Nominee
  - 2009-2010: Atherton
- National E.B. White Award Nominee
  - 2008: Atherton
- National Lamplighter Award
  - 2008: Beyond the Valley of Thorns
  - 2007: The Dark Hills Divide
- Wyoming Statewide Soaring Eagle Book Award short list
  - 2009: Atherton: House of Power
- Florida Sunshine State Young Reader's Award Program short list
  - 2008-2009: The Land of Elyon
  - 2008-2009: Elliot's Park
- New Hampshire Isinglass Teen Book Award Short List
  - 2008: Atherton: The House of Power
- VOYA's 2008 Top Shelf Fiction for Middle School Readers List
- National Literacy Explore New Worlds Booklist (1 of 20 books chosen by the Library of Congress)
  - Land of Elyon
- The Texas Bluebonnet Award (shortlist)
  - 2008: Atherton: The House of Power
- Junior Library Guild Premier Selection
  - 2008: Atherton: The House of Power
- Kids Wings Award recipient
  - 2008: Atherton: The House of Power
- Cochecho Readers Award
  - 2005-2006: The Dark Hills Divide
- Great Stone Face Award nominee
  - 2006: The Dark Hills Divide
- Indian Paintbrush Award nominee
  - 2005-2006: The Dark Hills Divide
- Black-Eyed Susan Award nominee
  - 2006-2007: The Dark Hills Divide
- Waukesha County Kids Choice Award nominee
  - 2006: The Dark Hills Divide
  - 2007: Beyond the Valley of Thorns
- The Children's Crown Award nominee
  - 2006-2007: The Dark Hills Divide
- iParenting Media Award
  - 2005: The Dark Hills Divide
- Colorado Children's Book Award nominee
  - 2007: Beyond the Valley of Thorns

== Bibliography ==
=== Novels ===
- The Black Circle (2009) - the 5th book of The 39 Clues series
- Thirteen Days to Midnight (2010)
- Omega Rising (2016) - the 3rd part of Voyagers series
- Mr. Gedrick and Me (2019)
- The Inventors (2021)

==== The Land of Elyon Series ====
- The Dark Hills Divide (2005)
- Beyond the Valley of Thorns (2005)
- The Tenth City (2006)
- Into the Mist (Prequel) (2007)
- Stargazer (2008)

==== Atherton Series ====
- House of Power (2007)
- Rivers of Fire (2008)
- The Dark Planet (2009)

==== Elliot's Park Series ====
- Saving Mister Nibbles (2008)
- Haunted Hike (2008)
- The Walnut Cup (2009)

==== Skeleton Creek Series ====
- Skeleton Creek (2009)
- Ghost in the Machine (2009)
- The Crossbones (2010)
- The Raven (2011)
- The Phantom Room (2014)
- Skeleton Creek is Real (2014)

==== Trackers series ====
- Trackers (2010)
- Trackers: Shantorian (2011)

==== 3:15 Series ====
- 3:15 Season One: Things That Go Bump in the Night (book) (2011)

==== Dark Eden Series ====
- Dark Eden (2011)
- Dark Eden 2: Eve of Destruction (book) (2012)

==== Floors Series ====
- Floors Book 1: Floors (2011)
- Floors Book 2: 3 Below (2012)
- Floors Book 3: The Field of Wacky Inventions (2013)

==== Pulse Series ====
- Pulse (2014)
- Tremor (2015)
- Quake (2016)

==== Fizzopolis Series ====
- Fizzopolis: The Trouble With Fuzzwonker Fizz (2017)
- Fizzopolis: Snoodles (2017)
- Fizzopolis: Floozombies (2018)

==== Towervale Series ====
- Towervale (2019)
- Towervale II: The Crystal Mountain (2020)

==== Bonkers! Series ====
- The Terror in Jenny's Armpit (2024)
- Attack of the Forty-Foot Chicken (2024)
- Escape from the Dungeons of Snerbville (2024)
