= The Land of Elyon =

Children's fantasy novels by Patrick Carman

The Land of Elyon is a series of children's fantasy novels by American author Patrick Carman. The series consists of five novels:

1. The Dark Hills Divide (2005)
2. Beyond the Valley of Thorns (2005)
3. The Tenth City (2006)
4. Into the Mist (2007)
5. Stargazer (2008)
