= Into the Mist =

2007 novel by Patrick Carman

The Dark Hills Divide
- The Land of Elyon - Into the Mist
- Author: Patrick Carman
- Audio read by: Ron McLarty
- Illustrator: Brad Weinman
- Language: English
- Series: The Land of Elyon
- Genre: Fantasy
- Publisher: Scholastic Corporation
- Publication date: 2007
- Publication place: United States
- Media type: Print (Hardback & Paperback)

Into the Mist is a children's fantasy novel by American author Patrick Carman. It is a prequel to the first book in The Land of Elyon series, The Dark Hills Divide.

The audiobook is narrated by American actor Ron McLarty.

== Plot ==
Alexa Daley is sailing on the Warwick Beacon with two of her closest companions, Roland Warvold, and Yipes. As the story progresses Roland decides to tell Alexa and Yipes of his and his brother, Thomas Warvold's, past. Going into detail of how they escaped from the House on the Hill, how they crossed the Lake of Fire, how they climbed to the top of the Wakefield House, and lastly how they came to be travelers by Land and by Sea. He tells them of Sir Alistair Wakefield and of the knowledge and years they spent him, and he also tells them of a very close friend called [Thorn], a mountain lion. As the story ends Roland finally tells Alexa and Yipes of the Five Stone Pillars and the Lost Children who live on them. Roland tells them that Abaddon is in the form of a sea monster and that he has followed them to the Five Stone Pillars to take control over them, thus ending the story and starting on Stargazer.

== Books in this series ==
- The Dark Hills Divide (Book 1)
- Beyond the Valley of Thorns (Book 2)
- The Tenth City (Book 3)
- Into the Mist (Prequel)
- Stargazer (Book 4)
