= The Tenth City =

2006 novel by Patrick Carman

Tenth City
- The Land of Elyon - Book 3 - The Tenth City
- Author: Patrick Carman
- Illustrator: Brad Weinman
- Language: English
- Series: The Land of Elyon
- Genre: Fantasy
- Publisher: Scholastic Corporation
- Publication date: 2006
- Publication place: United States
- Media type: Print (Hardback & Paperback)
- Pages: 186
- Preceded by: Beyond the Valley of Thorns
- Followed by: Stargazer (Patrick Carman)

The Tenth City is a children's fantasy novel, the third book in American author Patrick Carman's series of novels, The Land of Elyon.

== Plot ==
The Tenth City begins only a few hours after The Valley of The Thorns ends, just after the Dark Tower had crashed into the water and Alexa and her friends had escaped.

Alexa who is now 13, Thomas, Roland, Balmoral, Odessa, Catherine, and Armon were aboard the Warwick Beacon in the darkness on The Lonely Sea. With the last Jocasta in her possession, Alexa once again had the power to talk to the forest animals and to hear the guiding voice of Elyon. After they dropped Catharine in Lathbury and Balmoral in Castalia, Elyon sent the crew into the stormy waters where they learned of the secret cliffs beyond Turlock. Along the way, they encountered fierce winds, a swarm of evil killer bats and learned of a shortcut back to Bridewell.

Alexa also learned that Bridewell was now empty except for Grindall and his ogres and that Yipes was being held captive there. With Pervis's help, Alexa and Murphy crawled through the secret tunnel back to the library at Renny Lodge where Yipes was locked in a small cage. Alexa burst through the secret door as Armon leaped into the room through the window. Armon tossed the ogre on guard to its death in the courtyard below. Alexa and Murphy grabbed the cage, escaped through the secret tunnel and slammed the secret door shut behind them, leaving Grindall screaming with rage. Alexa and Murphy scrambled back to where they had first met Ander (the grizzly bear and forest king) and the forest council. When the lantern died out, they used the glowing orange Jocasta to light the way, but when they arrived, they were shocked to find that all the animals were gone, the lush forest had wilted and only the stones remained.

As Ander was telling Alexa that the last Jocasta would show them the way to the Tenth City once they reached Sly Field, they were surrounded by Grindall and his army of ogres and Odessa. Alexa, Warvold, Armon, and Yipes were forced to surrender and lead Grindall to the Sly Field. They got there in no time – the ogres ran the entire way carrying Grindall and Odessa in a plush sedan chair. As the fast-moving white cloud engulfed them, they followed the orange beam cast from the Jocasta towards The Tenth City and soon found themselves swarmed by dust and a dark cloud of thousands of black bats. In all the confusion, Armon killed three of the ogres and freed Yipes. Murphy grabbed the Jocasta out of Grindall's hands just as he ordered all of his forces to charge Elyon and seize control of the Tenth City. When the bats, Grindall, and the ogres charged into the mist, they were all sucked back down into their dark source where they could never escape.

In a twisted, yet brilliant plan, Alexa and Murphy managed to fool and free their world of the terrible forces of Abaddon, Grindall and his stinking ogres before they could destroy Elyon or the Tenth City. Yes, it was the cliff where Armon, Alexa, and Murphy had swum ashore from the Warwick Beacon. In the end, Alexa realized that Elyon and the beauty of the mystical Tenth City would always be there for them. Alexa also realized that Odessa had not betrayed them, because she had asked Odessa to help lure Grindall and his ogres to the Sly Field where they could be disposed of.

When the calm set in, Armon wandered back into the Sly Field to look for Warvold and returned with his body. Then Alexa once again used the Jocasta to point the way to the Tenth City. As the clouds cleared, Elyon spoke out and invited Armon to bring Alexa's father home. It was only then that Alexa came to realize that her real parents were Thomas and Catherine (Renny) Warvold, not James and Laura Daley. It was a beautiful sight... Armon, John Christopher, and Warvold were standing together, alive again and smiling back at them.

As Alexa, Murphy, Odessa, and Yipes headed home, the Fenwick Forest was miraculously turning back into the lush green retreat that it was before and all the forest animals had returned: Ander (grizzly bear – the forest king), Beaker (raccoon), Raymond (fox), Henry (badger), Picardy (female black bear), Boone (bobcat), Malcolm (rabbit), Vesper (woodchuck), Darius (wolf), Sherwin (Darius’ son).

When Alexa finally returned home to Lathbury, she once again, asked her father to tell her the story about how the walls were built...just like he had told her the first time...

The story closes with Alexa, Yipes and Roland setting off on another journey, on the deck of the Warwick Beacon.

== Books in this series ==
- The Dark Hills Divide (Book 1)
- Beyond the Valley of Thorns (Book 2)
- The Tenth City (Book 3)
- Into the Mist (Prequel)
- Stargazer (Book 4)
