= Oceans (The Tea Party song) =

Single by The Tea Party

from the album Seven Circles
- Released: May 2005
- Recorded: Orange Studios (Toronto) and Metalworks Studios in Mississauga, Ontario
- Genre: Rock
- Length: 4:35
- Label: EMI Music Canada
- Songwriter: The Tea Party
- Producers: Gavin Brown and Jeff Martin

The Tea Party singles chronology
| "Stargazer" (2004) | "Oceans" (2005) |

"Oceans" is a song by Canadian rock band The Tea Party. It was released as a promotional single in Canada, and their last single before disbanding. The music video was created by a team of animators and motion graphics students at York University headed by Jaimie Webster and Jonathon Corbiére.

"Oceans" was written in dedication to The Tea Party's late manager Steve Hoffman, who died of lung cancer in 2003. With the release of the single, The Tea Party hoped to bring more attention to the Steven Hoffman Fund.
