= Trackers (book series) =

Book series by Patrick Carman

- Trackers; Shantorian
- Author: Patrick Carman
- Country: United States
- Language: English
- Genre: Techno-thriller
- Publisher: Scholastic
- Published: 2010–2011
- No. of books: 2

Trackers is a duology of children's novels by American writer Patrick Carman. The eponymous first book in the series was published in 2010, followed by a second entry Shantorian in 2011.

The series contains an interactive component, as readers are directed to visit a Trackers website, where they can access additional media such as video.

== Synopsis ==
The series follows a group of four tech-savvy friends who band together to test out their new technology. Calling themselves the Trackers, the group finds themselves in trouble when their team is infiltrated. Their research brings them to a group called the ISD, the Internet Security Directive, which begs them to join them in their quest to defeat and capture a former ISD member, the hacker Shantorian.

== Books ==
- Trackers (2010)
- Shantorian (2011)

== Publication ==
The first entry in the series, Trackers, was first published in print and ebook format in the United States in 2010, through Scholastic. The second book, Shantorian, was published the following year, also through Scholastic.

A French language translation of both entries in the Trackers series was published in 2012 and 2013, respectively, through Bayard jeunesse.

== Development ==
When developing the series Carman chose to implement an interactive component to the series. At several points during the novels readers are given the option to visit a website where they can compete against each other in mini-games or view videos. Carman opted for this as he felt that children would not find stopping and starting a read as disruptive, as "that's the way they're wired". The mini-games, dubbed 'missions' on the website, became a popular part of the website, with some scores becoming so high that the creative team had to investigate to ensure that the scores were not a result of hacking.

There are currently no plans to write a third entry in the series; Carman ended the second novel, Shantorian, with a letter from the character Adam that provided an end to the story.
