= Beyond the Valley of Thorns =

2005 novel by Patrick Carman

- The Land of Elyon - Book 2 - Beyond the Valley of Thorns
- Author: Patrick Carman
- Illustrator: Brad Weinman
- Language: English
- Series: The Land of Elyon
- Genre: Fantasy
- Publisher: Scholastic Corporation
- Publication date: 2005
- Publication place: United States
- Media type: Print (Hardback & Paperback)
- Pages: 253
- Preceded by: The Dark Hills Divide
- Followed by: The Tenth City

Beyond the Valley of Thorns is a children's fantasy novel, the second book in Patrick Carman's series of novels, The Land of Elyon.

Beyond the Valley of Thorns was on the New York Times best-seller list.

== Summary ==
Alexa Daley returns in the second book in the series. A year has passed since her fateful adventure with the animals, and her Jocasta is as dull as ever. But then, Yipes returns with a letter from Thomas Warvold. Alexa is instructed to travel out over the Dark Hills, beyond the Valley of Thorns. She does so, and Alexa and Yipes are joined on their journey by Odessa the wolf, Squire the hawk, Murphy he squirrel, and a former convict named John Christopher.

Together they escape a massive black swarm of bats and reveal a secret: Warvold's wife, Renny, was carried off by a man named Victor Grindall and remains, alive, with him as he demands her to reveal the location of the last Jocasta. They also learn that one of a mystical ancient race, called Seraphs, became evil and has infected Grindall and the remaining Seraphs, now simply giants, with evil.

The group discovers that one Seraph, Armon, has evaded Abaddon's infectious black swarm of bats for years and is the only remaining good giant. He takes them across the deadly Valley of Thorns and into Castalia.

The group discovers two packs of dogs living in The City of Dogs, now an old dumping ground. The two leaders, Piggott and Scroggs, agree to fight Grindall and the ogres. With the help of a rebellious Castalian villager named Balmoral, they form an army and defeat all but a few of the ogres. Then, they discover Renny and Thomas Warvold in the dungeons of the Dark Tower (Warvold later told them he faked his death). Grindall and ten ogres escape with Yipes in their grasp. They send the tower crashing down, and Grindall threatens that if Alexa is not in Bridewell with the last Jocasta in five days, he will kill Yipes.

The story ends as Roland Warvold, Thomas's brother, takes the troop (including Balmoral) on his ship, the Warwick Beacon, to sail the Lonely Sea.

== Reception ==
Kirkus Reviews wrote "The plot takes off a lot faster than in the first installment, because Carman integrates the backstory as needed in the text, rather than allowing it to slow down the pace. Although the resolution of this tale satisfies, it ends on a cliffhanger, leaving readers to wait in suspense for the story's finale. Still, a trip with Alexa Daley through the Valley of Thorns is well worth the effort."

== Books in this series ==
- Into the Mist (Prequel)
- The Dark Hills Divide (Book 1)
- Beyond the Valley of Thorns (Book 2)
- The Tenth City (Book 3)
- Stargazer (Book 4)
