= Atherton: The House of Power =

2007 novel by Patrick Carman

- Book cover for Atherton: The House of Power
- Author: Patrick Carman
- Language: English
- Genre: Science fiction, fantasy
- Published: 2007 (Little, Brown)
- Publication place: United States
- Media type: Print (hardback & paperback)
- Followed by: Atherton: Rivers of Fire

Atherton: The House of Power is a dystopian novel written by Patrick Carman. Set in the future, it is about Edgar and Samuel, two boys who live on the fictional world of Atherton: an artificial planet created by the child prodigy scientist Dr. Harding. Atherton's purpose was to provide a new haven for the people of Earth (now known grimly as "the Dark Planet"), whose pollution and overpopulation problems have come to an extreme. Those who wished to live on Atherton were transported there by unknown means, and had their memories of previous life on Earth erased. Carman has stated that he drew on stories such as Frankenstein and The Turn of the Screw for inspiration for Atherton. The inspiration that he pulled from Frankenstein was the mad scientist creating the planet and the creatures, and how the creation becomes dangerous and causes death and chaos. The inspiration from The Turn of the Screw was just all of the mystery and uncertainty that the reader has the whole time reading this story. This book is part of a trilogy.

== Atherton geography and society ==
Atherton's society is closely knit to its physical geography. Unlike other planets, Atherton is not shaped like a sphere. Rather, it is shaped roughly like an elongated birthday cake, with each layer having less circumference than the one below it. Atherton has three layers: the Flatlands, the bottom and most barren layer; Tabletop, the middle and most widely populated layer; and the Highlands, the highest layer where governmental figures reside in the House of Power.

The Flatlands is a barren wasteland devoid of human life, or so they appear. All of Atherton's waste is thrown into the Flatlands, and is then disposed of by Cleaners, organisms that resemble oversized centipedes, that eat anything in their path. Because of the Flatlands' largeness, its bottom provides the force of gravity for the pseudo-planet and sustains its orbit around Earth.

People who dwell on Tabletop are viewed as peasants. They live in three villages: the Village of Sheep, the Village of Rabbits, and the Grove, where Edgar resides. It is the responsibility of Tabletop-dwellers to pay regular taxes to the Highlands in the form of figs, sheep and rabbits, which are carried to the Highlands via buckets on pulleys. In return, the ruler of Atherton (Lord Phineus during the time of the story) keeps the water supply to Tabletop regular.

People who dwell in the Highlands are Atherton's upper class. Almost all of them reside in the House of Power, a large castle that has many courtyards filled with vegetation, giving it the appearance of having fused with nature. Atherton's system of government, a monarchical Lord advised by a board of Knights, rules literally over the people of Tabletop. Each knight wields great power over Atherton directly or indirectly through legions of elite soldiers from the Highlands, or loyal Tabletopions guards who enforce the rule of the Highlands, and make sure work quotas are fulfilled. By unknown means, the Lord of Atherton is able to control the flow of the three waterfalls that provide water to Tabletop. Should the people of Tabletop pay inadequate taxes, or begin to stir up feelings of anarchy, the Lord could slow or completely stop the water supply, effectively putting any rebellion to a quick halt. Due to this immense power, Atherton is becoming more or less a dictatorship.

== Characters ==
- Edgar – an orphaned Tabletop-dweller who works in the Grove. He enjoys climbing the hazardous cliffs that form the edge of the Highlands layer. While climbing, he finds a book that plunges him into an adventure about the true nature of Atherton, and the crisis threatening to turn his world inside out.
- Samuel – a Highlands dweller. He encounters and makes friends with Edgar after Edgar climbs to the Highlands in search of someone who can read the book he found to him. His father, one of the Knights in the House of Power, died in a supposed accidental falling from the cliff, but events suggest he was actually murdered.
- Isabel – one of Edgar's friends in the Grove. She is heavily influenced by Edgar and enjoys spending time with him, though Edgar views her as a nuisance. She is a strong leader and organizes the rebellion against the Highlands.
- Mr. Ratikan – the owner of the Grove. He oversees the picking of figs to pay the Highlands' taxes. He is very irritable and mean to the workers, especially Edgar, who often causes mischief. He is in league with Lord Phineas in a secret project with nasty results.
- Lord Phineus – the ruler of Atherton. He is a tyrant, and uses his board of two people, Sir Emerick and Sir Philip, to enforce his evil laws. He is secretly working on a project with Mr. Ratikan to further increase his power.
- Dr. Kincaid – a doctor who secretly lives in the Flatlands to supervise the terrible events to occur in Atherton. He traveled to Atherton without losing his memories. He was Dr. Harding's colleague, but now views him as a mad scientist.
- Dr. Harding – the creator of Atherton. He was discovered by Dr. Kincaid and his fellow scientists as a child and soon displayed unparalleled genius. While creating Atherton, he delved into insanity, perhaps developing a god complex.
- Sir Emerik – Lord Phineas's guard who wants to become king.
- Vincent – lives down in Flatlands with Dr. Kincaid, Dr Kincaids protected and Cleaner killer
- Maude – Briney's wife
- Briney – keeper of the inn in the village of Rabbits
- Sir Phillip – Lord Phineas's guard
- Charles – Isabel's dad
- Wallace – farmer for the village of Sheep
- Horace – guard for The House of Power

== Sequels ==
There are two sequels, Atherton: Rivers of Fire and Atherton: The Dark Planet.

== Reception ==
The School Library Journal praised the book's pacing. Publishers Weekly described the book as "a fluid and compelling fantasy and mystery."
