= Hyundai Stargazer =

Compact MPV

- 2025 Hyundai Stargazer X (facelift, Philippines)

Overview
- Manufacturer: Hyundai
- Model code: KS
- Production: July 2022 – present
- Assembly: Indonesia: Cikarang, West Java (HMMI)
- Designer: Kim Chung-eun

Body and chassis
- Class: Compact MPV
- Body style: 5-door wagon
- Layout: Front-engine, front-wheel-drive
- Platform: Hyundai-Kia K2
- Related: Kia Carens (KY); Hyundai Creta (SU2)

Powertrain
- Engine: Petrol: 1.5 L Smartstream G1.5 MPi I4
- Power output: 85 kW (113 bhp; 115 PS)
- Transmission: 6-speed manual; CVT

Dimensions
- Wheelbase: 2,780 mm (109.4 in)
- Length: 4,460 mm (175.6 in) (Pre-facelift); 4,575 mm (180.1 in) (Stargazer Cartenz); 4,495 mm (177.0 in) (Stargazer X); 4,610 mm (181.5 in) (Stargazer X Cartenz)
- Width: 1,780 mm (70.1 in); 1,815 mm (71.5 in) (Stargazer X); 1,820 mm (71.7 in) (Stargazer X Cartenz)
- Height: 1,690–1,695 mm (66.5–66.7 in) (Pre-facelift); 1,710 mm (67.3 in) (Stargazer Cartenz); 1,710 mm (67.3 in) (Stargazer X); 1,740 mm (68.5 in) (Stargazer X Cartenz)
- Kerb weight: 1,191–1,272 kg (2,626–2,804 lb)

The Hyundai Stargazer is a compact multi-purpose vehicle (MPV) produced by Hyundai Motor Company in Indonesia since 2022.

The vehicle was first introduced on 15 July 2022 when the first units of the vehicle rolled off its assembly line at HMMI in Cikarang. It was launched and made its public debut at the 29th Gaikindo Indonesia International Auto Show on 11 August.

== Markets ==
=== Brunei ===
The Stargazer was launched in Brunei on 5 May 2023, it is available in two variants: High (7-seater) and Premium (6-seater) variants. Hyundai SmartSense is standard for the Premium variant. The Standard (7-seater) variant was added in July 2023.

=== Indonesia ===
For Indonesia, the Stargazer is available in four initial grade levels: Active, Trend, Style and Prime. The former two grades are available with either 6-speed manual or CVT transmission options, while the latter two grades are only available with CVT transmission as standard. Captains seats are optional for each grade except for the Active grade. Hyundai SmartSense driver-assistance system is standard for the Prime grade.

The Stargazer received an update on 17 July 2023. Updates consists of a revised dashboard design for all grades, new rear disc brakes and electronic parking brake with auto brake hold for the Prime grade, and a new grade called Essential, replacing the Trend grade.

The Style grade was replaced by the Essential Tech grade with Hyundai SmartSense driver-assistance system on 13 February 2025.

The facelifted Stargazer was launched in Indonesia as the Stargazer Cartenz on 23 July 2025 at the 32nd Gaikindo Indonesia International Auto Show. It is available with four variants: Trend, Style, Smart HSS and Prime HSS, all variants are powered by the same engine used on the pre-facelift model.

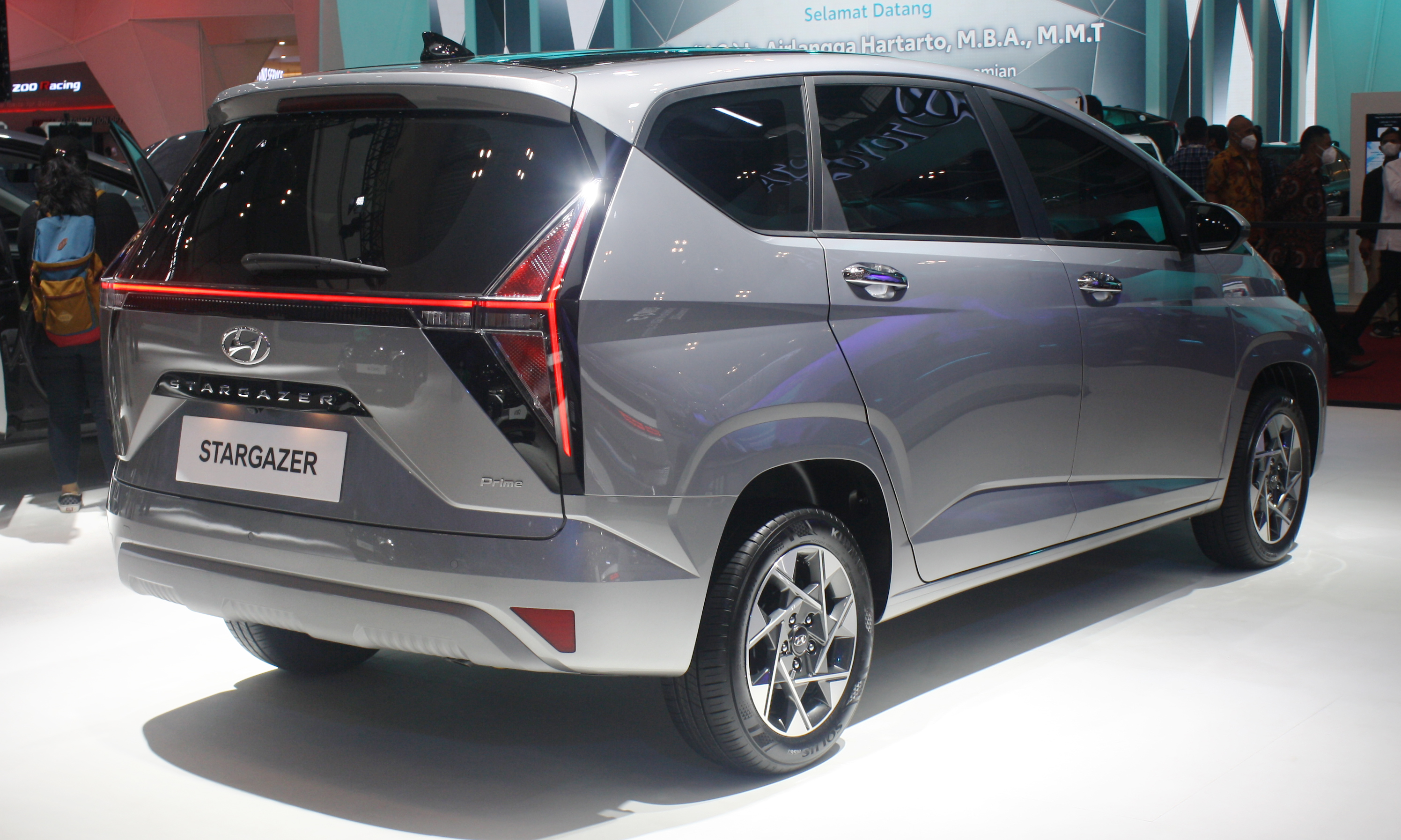
2022 Stargazer Prime (Indonesia)

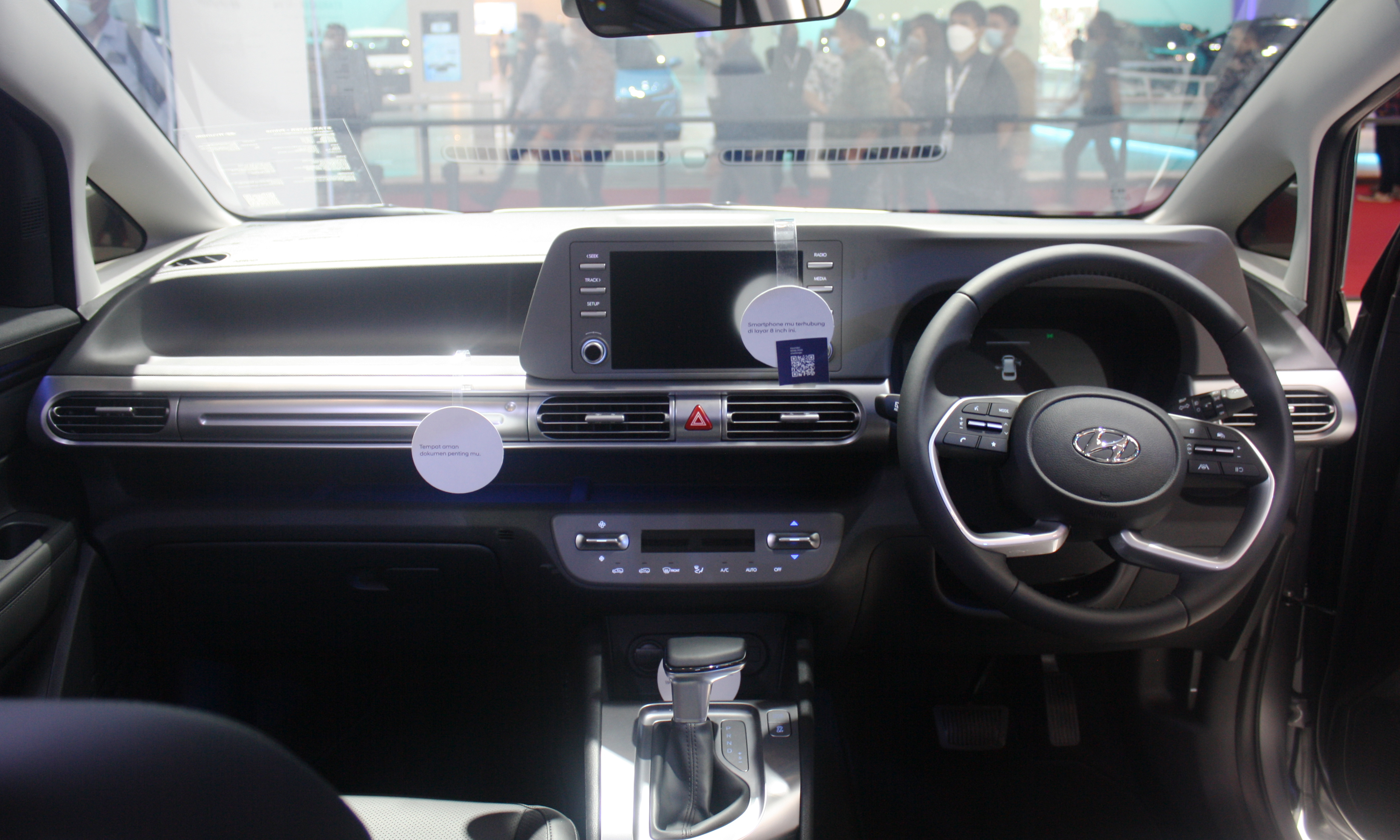
Interior

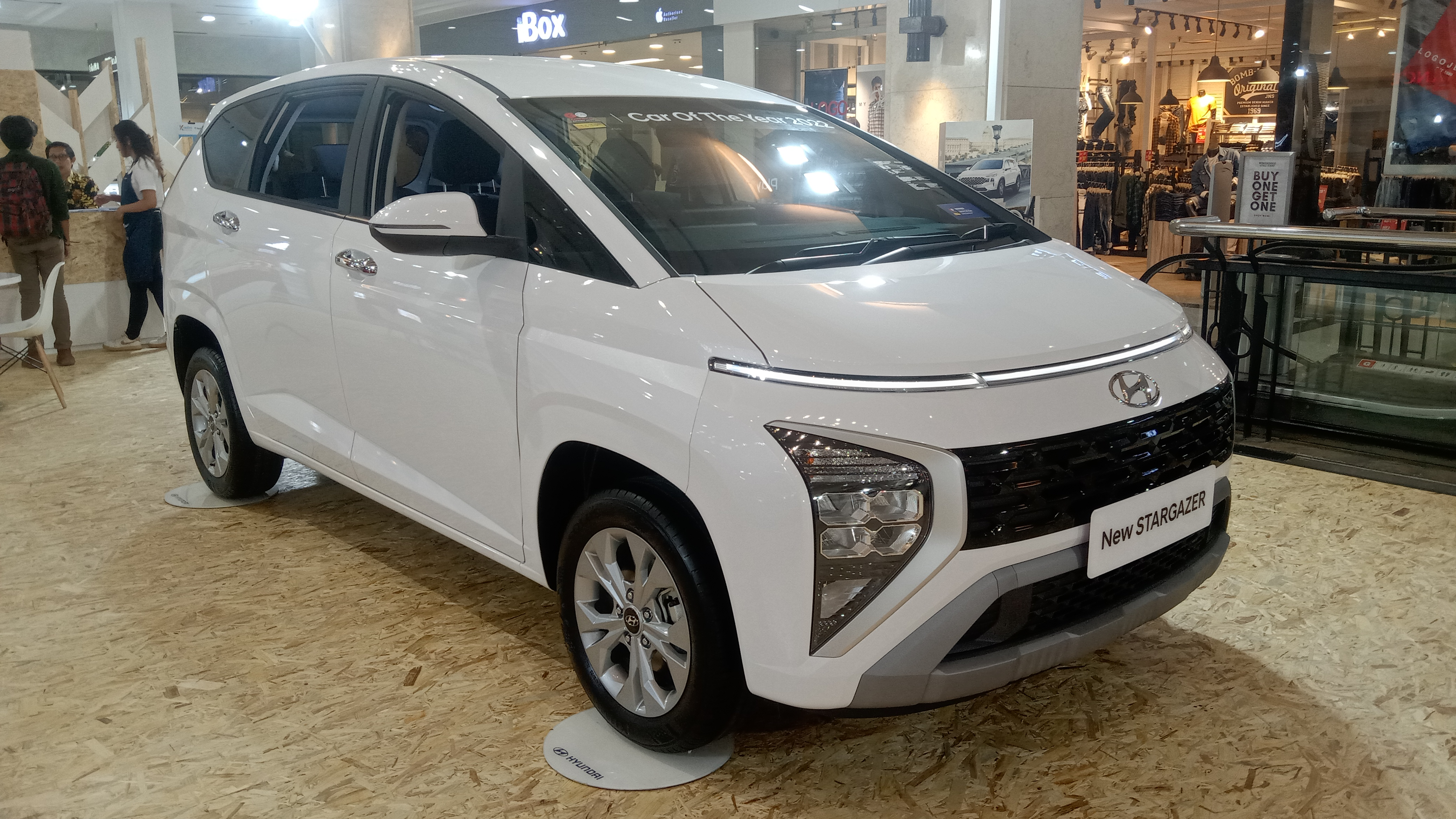
2023 Hyundai Stargazer Essential (Indonesia)

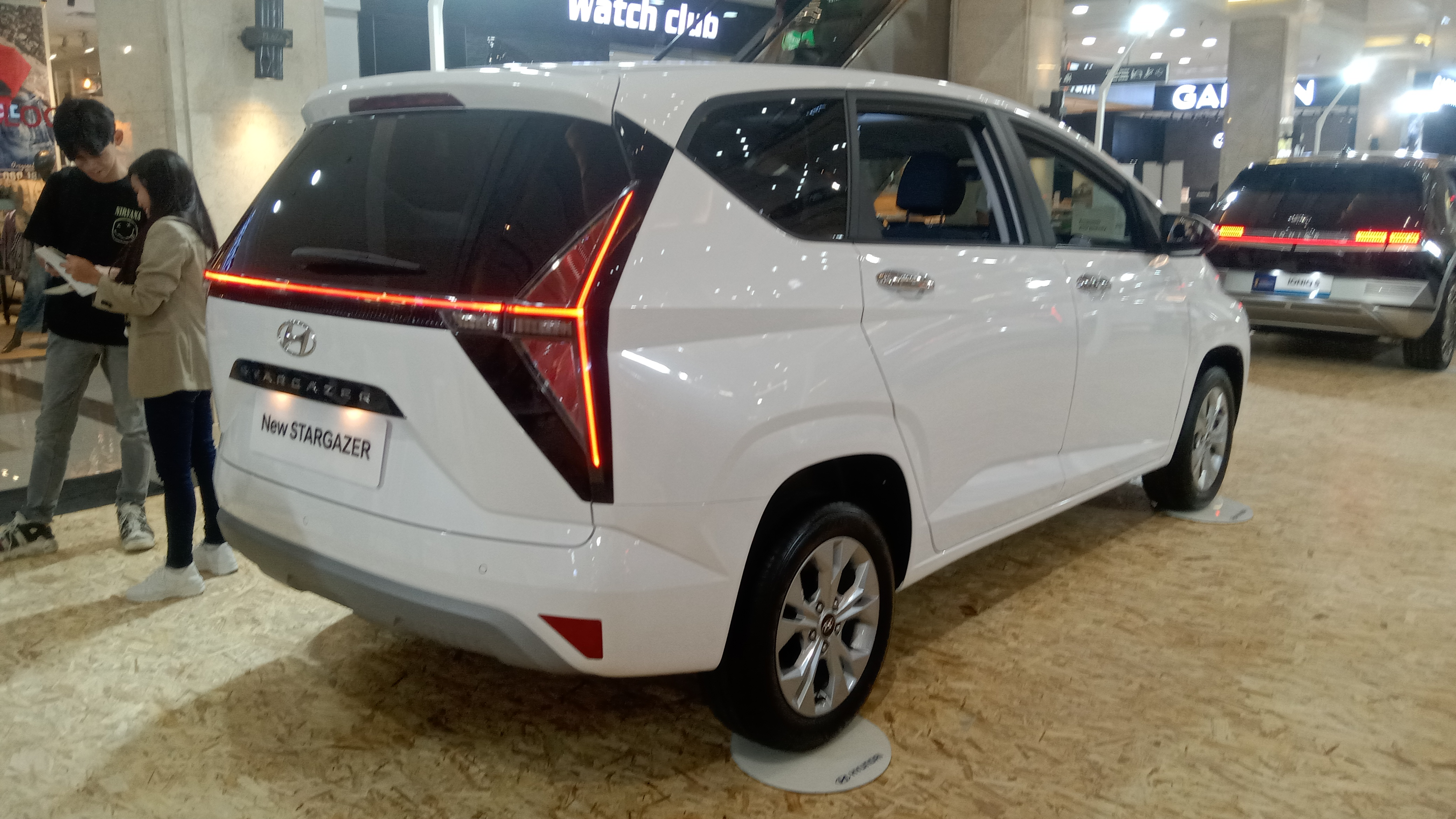
2023 Hyundai Stargazer Essential (Indonesia)

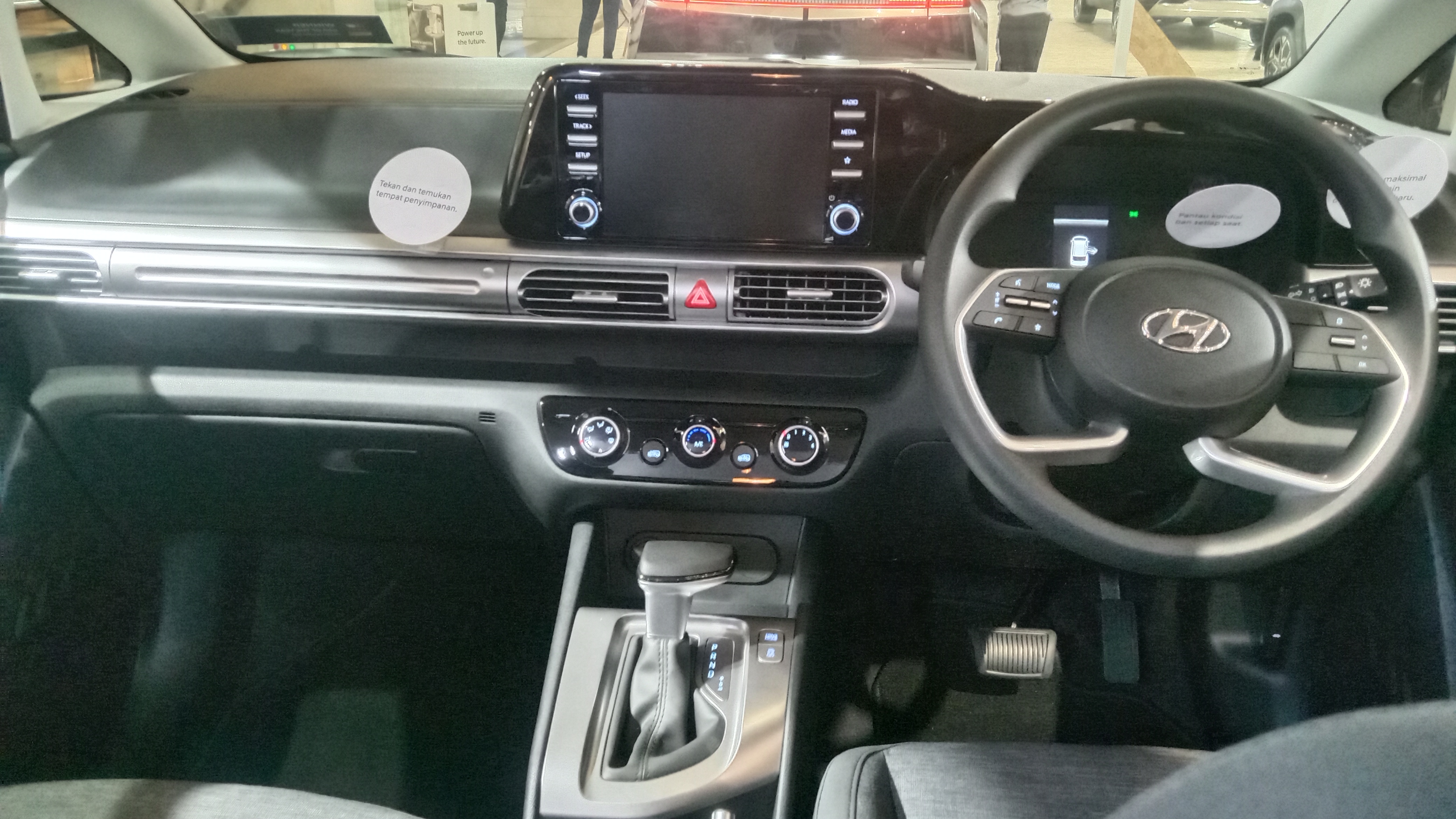
2023 Hyundai Stargazer Essential (Indonesia)

=== Malaysia ===
The Stargazer was previewed in Malaysia at the 2026 Kuala Lumpur International Mobility Show in June 2026, and was launched on 22 September 2026. Fully imported from Indonesia, it is available with two grades: Style and Prime.

=== Middle East ===
In the GCC markets, the Stargazer was launched in May 2024.

=== Philippines ===
The Stargazer was launched in the Philippines on 8 November 2022, it is available with three grades: GL, GLS and GLS Premium. Hyundai SmartSense is standard for the GLS Premium grade. While the Captain Seats option for the GLS Premium grade was previewed at the 18th Manila International Auto Show on 13 April 2023 and it was made available to the dealerships on 16 October 2023.

The facelifted Stargazer was launched in the Philippines on 14 October 2025. It is available with two grades: GL Plus and GLS, all variants are powered by the same engine used on the pre-facelift model.

=== Thailand ===
The Stargazer was introduced in Thailand on 30 November 2022 at the 39th Thailand International Motor Expo with sales later commenced on 20 March 2023. In Thailand, the Stargazer was available with five variants: Trend, Style, Smart 7, Smart 6 and Smart 6 Black Roof.

The facelifted Stargazer was launched in Thailand on 16 March 2026, with two variants: Trend 6 and Smart 6.

=== Vietnam ===
The Stargazer was launched in Vietnam on 20 October 2022, it is available with three grades: Standard, Special and Premium. Captain seats are available as an option for the Premium grade. Hyundai SmartSense is standard for the Premium grade. Initially imported from Indonesia, local production in Vietnam commenced in 2023.

The facelifted Stargazer was launched in Vietnam on 24 March 2026, with two variants: Special Edition and Premium Edition.

== Stargazer X ==
The Stargazer X is a more rugged-looking variant of the regular Stargazer. It was revealed at the 30th Gaikindo Indonesia International Auto Show on 10 August 2023. Compared to the standard model, the Stargazer X can be distinguished by the redesigned bonnet, grille and bumper guards, addition of black over fenders, side body cladding, roof rails, rear spoiler, 17-inch alloy wheels, and Bose-branded audio system.

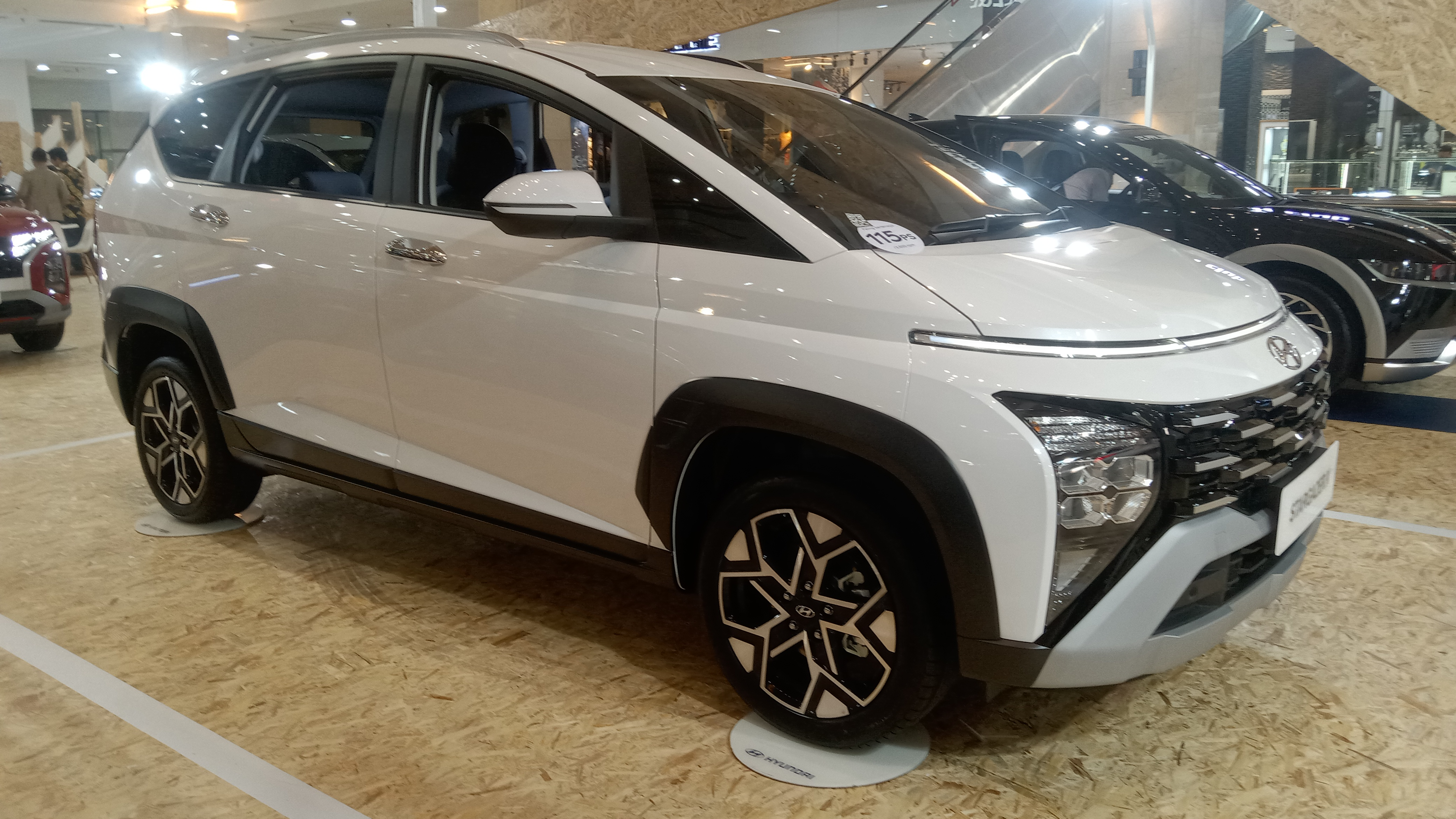
Front view

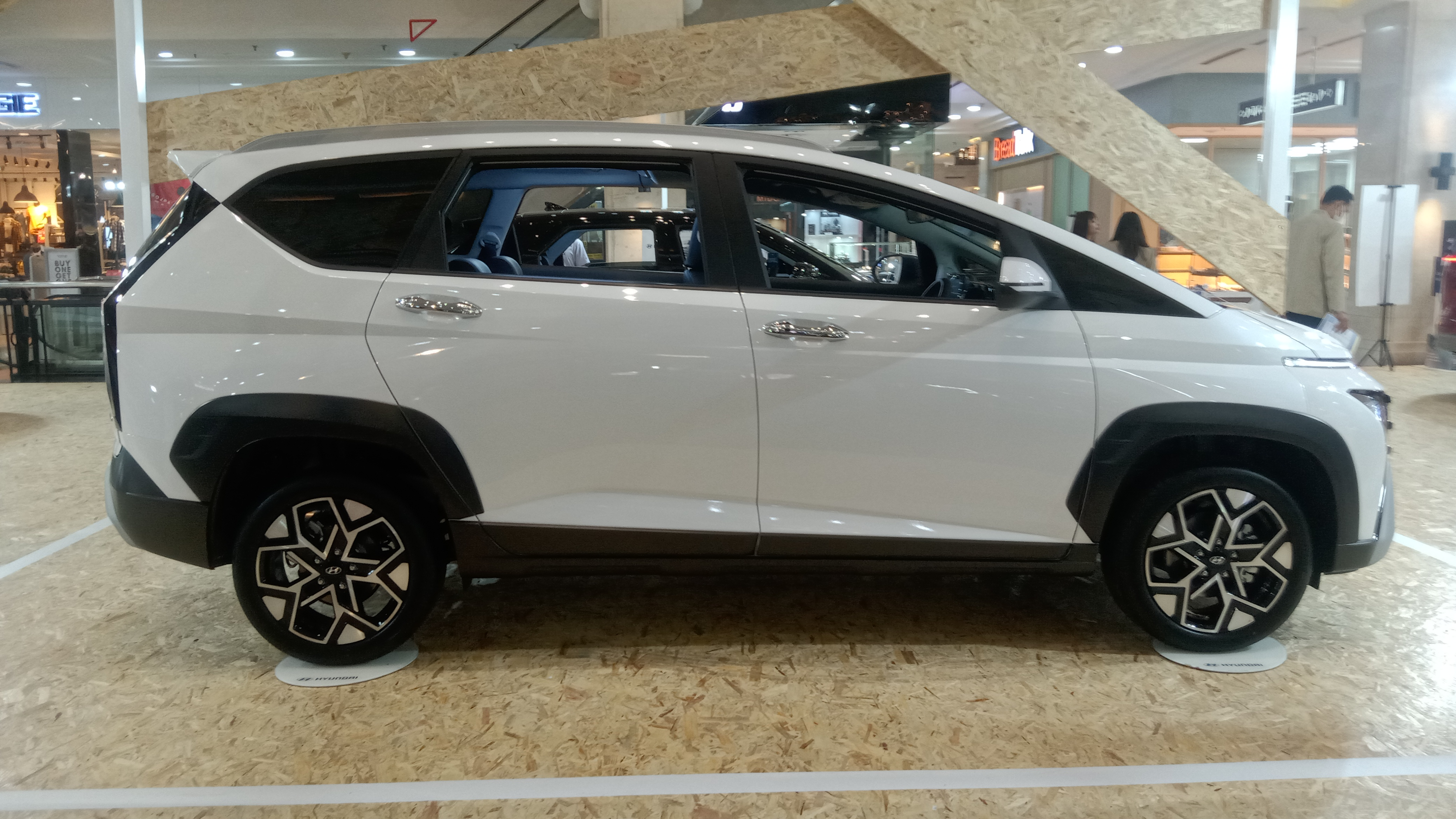
Side view

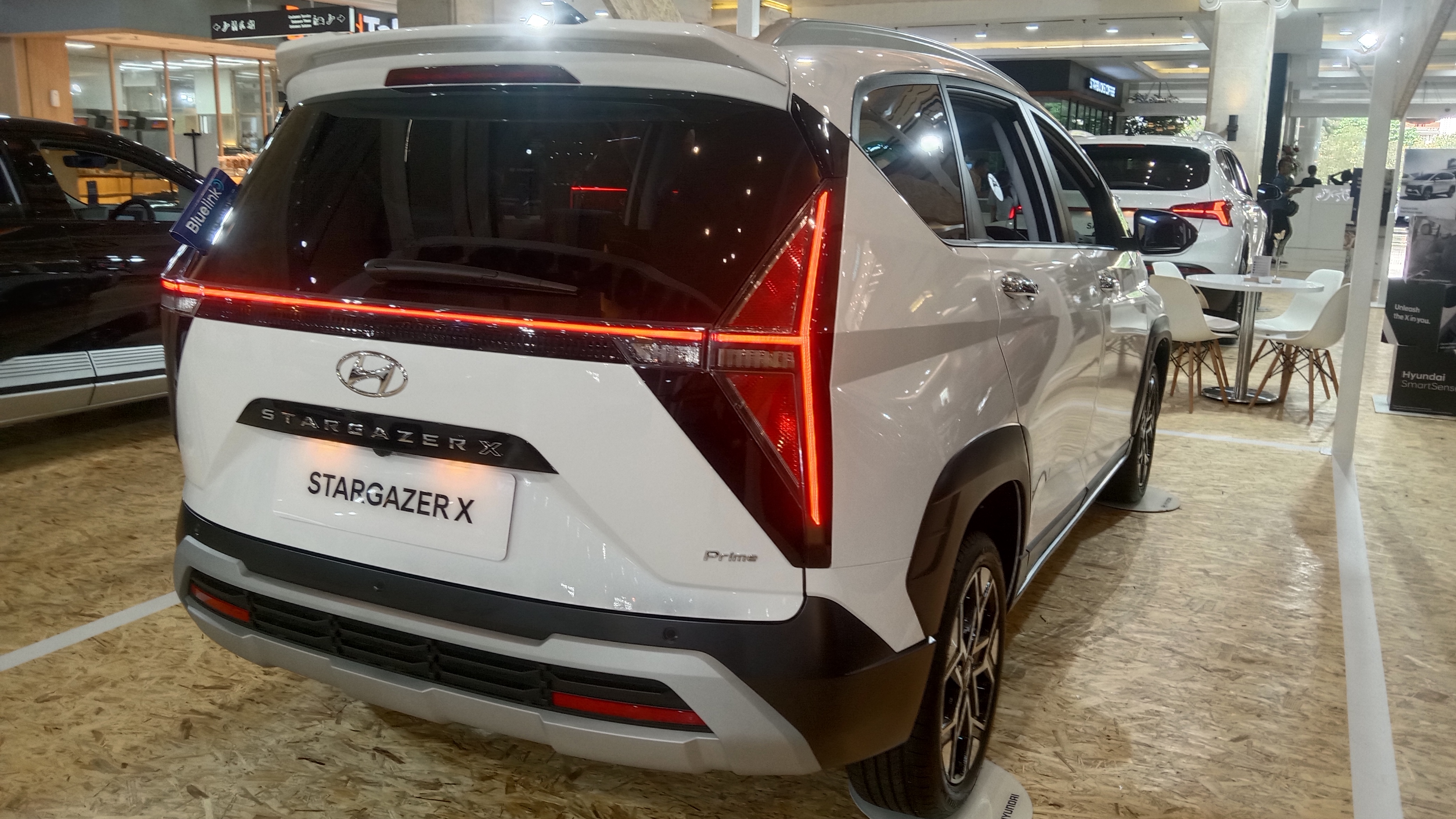
Rear view

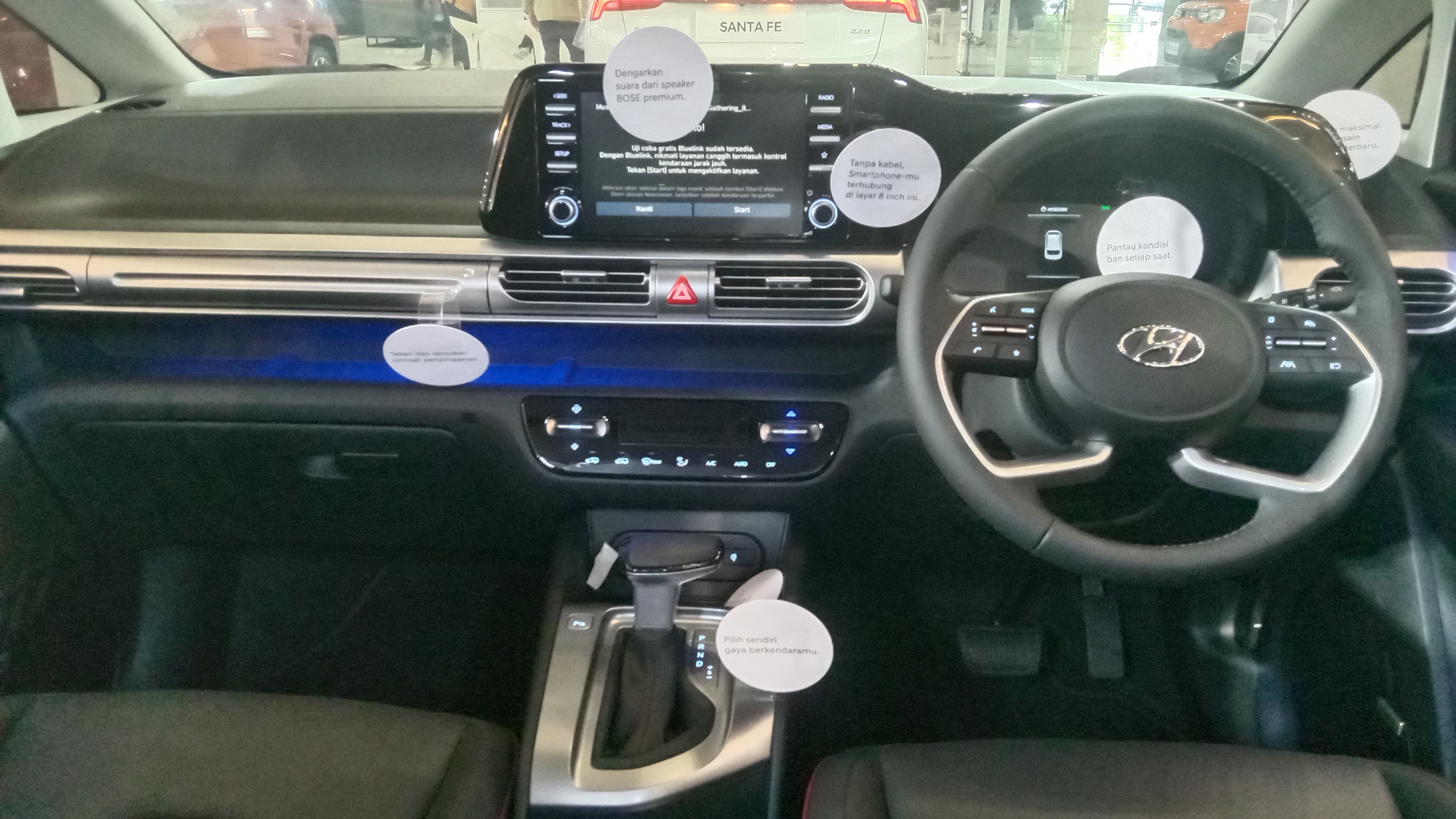
Interior

=== Markets ===
==== Brunei ====
The Stargazer X was launched in Brunei on 28 August 2026 with the facelifted model, the Stargazer X is available in the sole variant with 6-seater.

==== Indonesia ====
In Indonesia, it is available with two variants: Style and Prime, all variants are powered by the same engine from the standard Stargazer model.

The facelifted Stargazer X was launched in Indonesia as the Stargazer Cartenz X on 23 July 2025 at the 32nd Gaikindo Indonesia International Auto Show. It is available with three variants: Trend, Style and Prime Package, all variants are powered by the same engine used on the pre-facelift model.

==== Malaysia ====
The Stargazer X was launched in Malaysia on 22 September 2026, in the sole variant with 6-seater.

==== Philippines ====
The Stargazer X was launched in the Philippines on 16 October 2023 alongside the Hyundai Custin. In the Philippines, it is only available in a single grade level.

The facelifted Stargazer X was also launched in the Philippines on 14 October 2025. It is available with two grades: GLS Plus and Premium, all variants are powered by the same engine used on the pre-facelift model.

==== Thailand ====
The Stargazer X was introduced in Thailand on 26 September 2023, with the official launch scheduled on 4 October 2023. It is only offered in the sole variant. The Stargazer X was updated in Thailand on 26 March 2024, with two variants: X6 (6-Seater) and X7 (7-Seater).

== Facelift ==
In July 2025, the Stargazer underwent a facelift to support the new design, especially in Indonesia, the Stargazer facelift is also known as "Cartenz" because it embodies the theme of "Original Indonesian Car" which was developed to meet the characteristics, conditions and needs of Indonesian consumers. The name Cartenz was inspired by the Carstensz Pyramid, the highest peak in Indonesia, the name represented Hyundai's vision to achieve higher standards in innovation and comfort.

Exterior changes includes a redesigned front fascia with a larger grille, a new headlight design replaces the previous split design, new LED daytime running lights which form a H-shape, new faux side intakes on the front bumper, a longer bonnet, new alloy wheel designs, new roof rails (previously fitted on the pre-facelift Stargazer X models), a redesigned rear fascia with a new taillight design which mimics the H-shaped motif from the front lighting, the numberplate holder was moved below to the rear bumper, and a new rear bumper design that features new silver accents.

Inside, there are new 10.25-inch displays for the digital instrument cluster and touchscreen infotainment system, a redesigned dashboard design with the omission of the tubular decorative trim, new controls for the HVAC system, and the shift-by-wire transmission lever mounted on the steering wheel (replacing the traditional gear lever) for the Cartenz X model. The facelift model saw the inclusion of new interior features such as a Bose sound system, integrated satellite navigation, and powered adjustable driver's seat with the ventilation function.

For safety, all Cartenz models are equipped with the Hyundai SmartSense (HSS) advanced driver-assistance systems, which saw the inclusion of new features such as Blind Spot View Monitor (BVM), Front Parking Distance Warning, Smart Cruise Control with Stop & Go, Surround View Monitor (SVM).

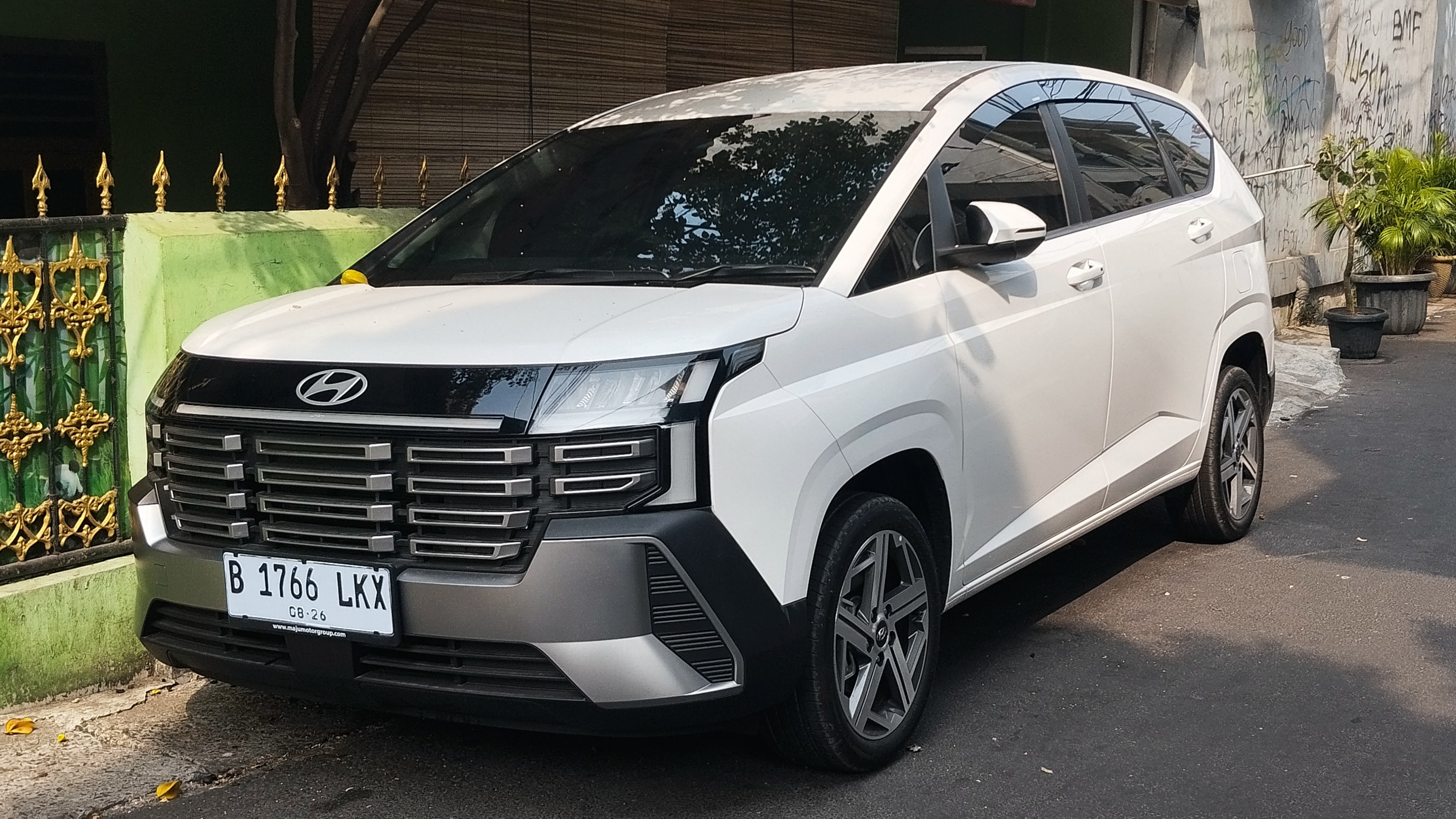
Stargazer facelift (Indonesia)

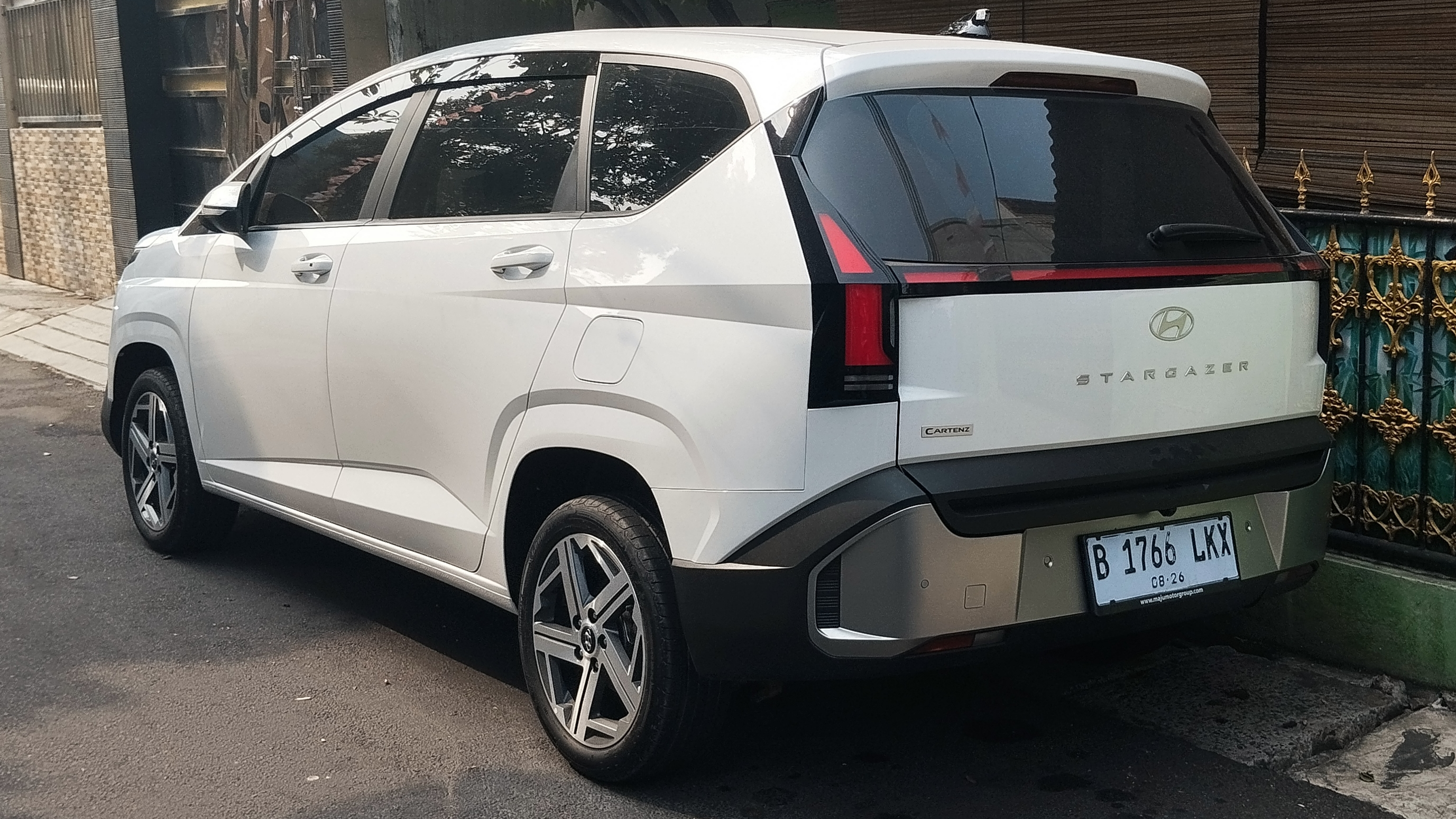
Rear view

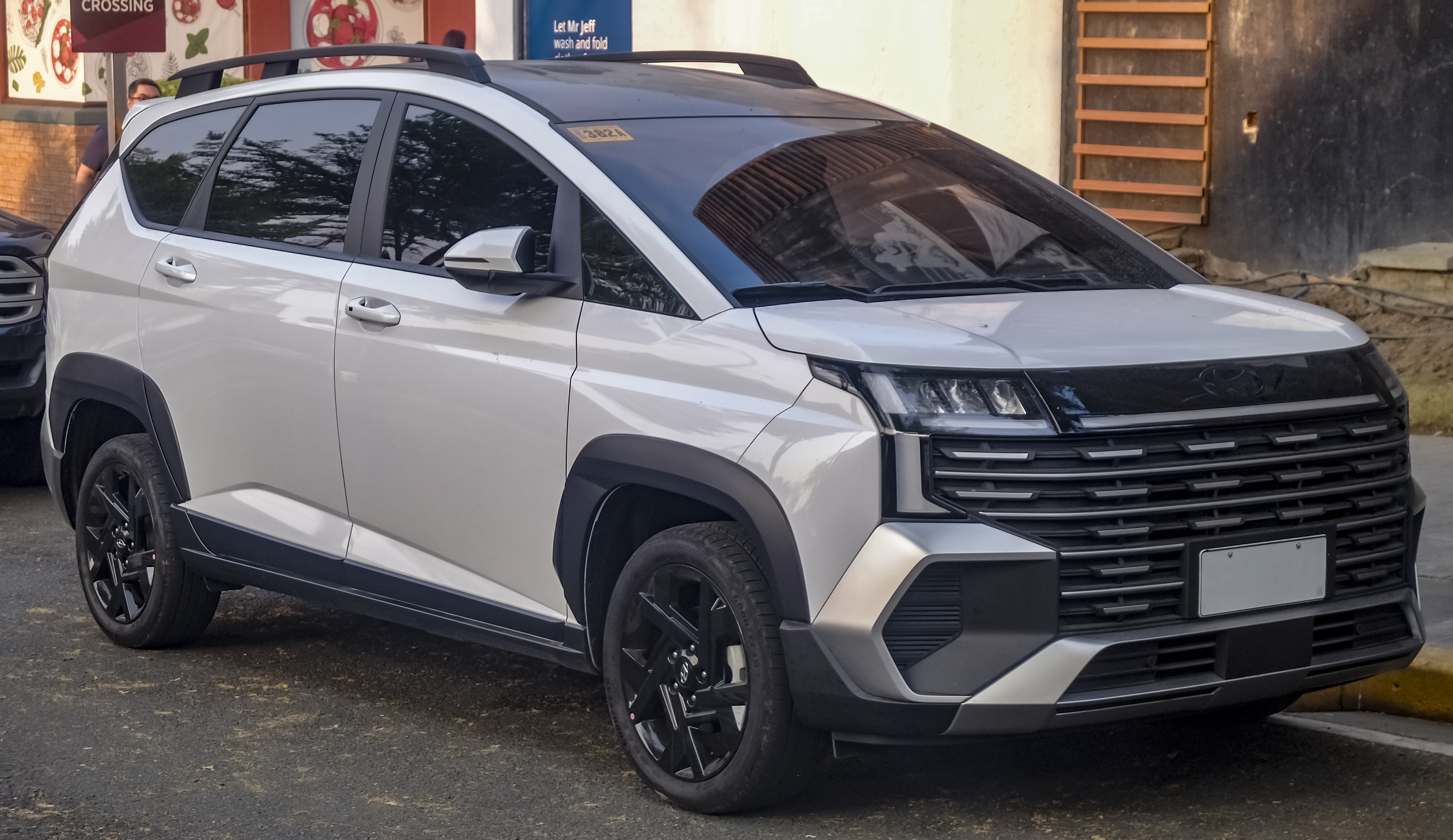
Stargazer X facelift (Philippines)

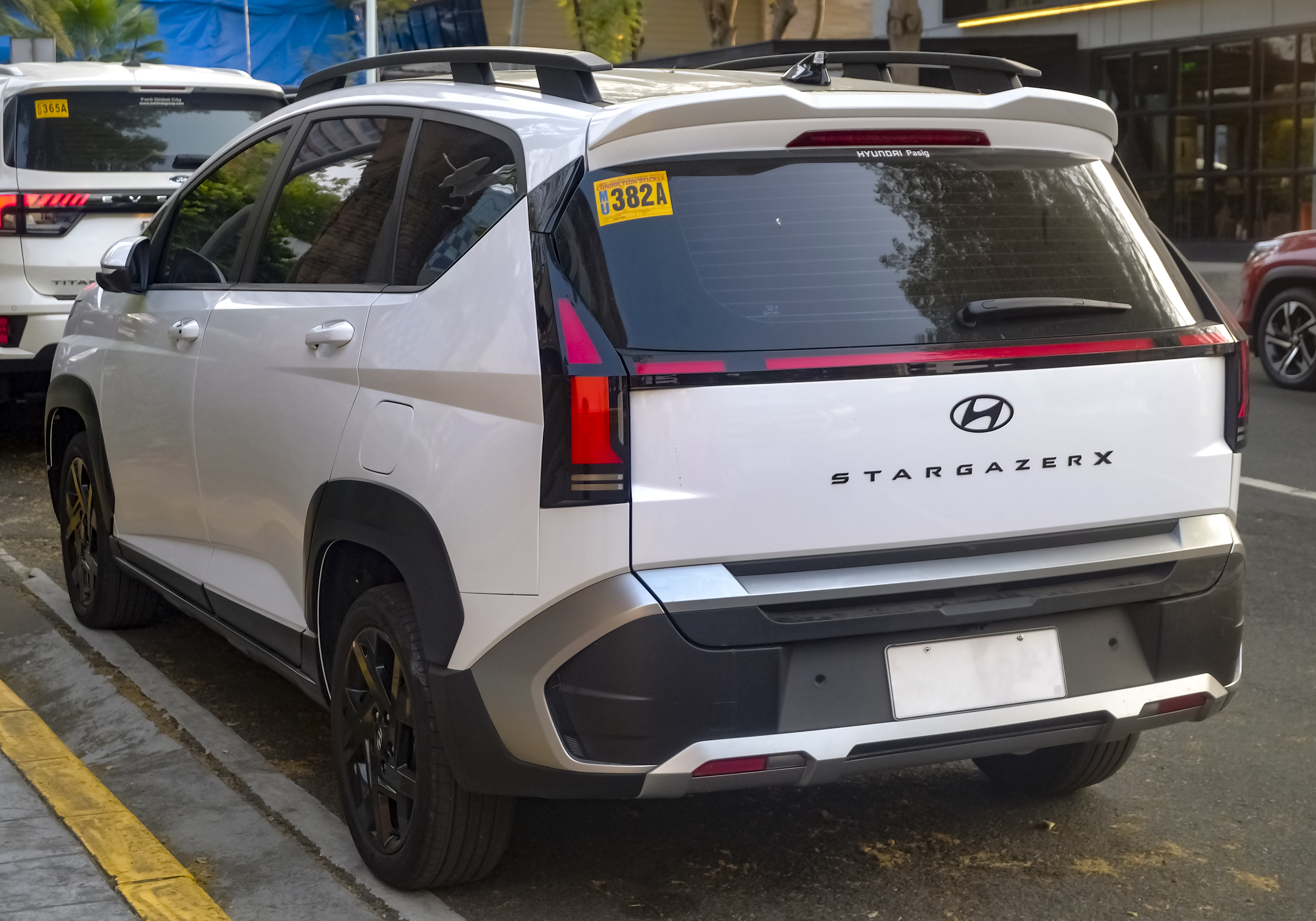
Rear view

== Safety ==
ASEAN NCAP test results Hyundai Stargazer (2022)
Test	Points
Overall:	4 /5 stars
Adult occupant:	31.21
Child occupant:	14.48
Safety assist:	12.04
Motorcyclist Safety:	8.75

== Sales ==
Year	Indonesia		Vietnam	Thailand	Philippines
Year	Stargazer	Stargazer X	Vietnam	Thailand	Philippines
2022	11,094		1,121		
2023	13,036	2,850	3,857	1,519	
2024	7,201	4,192	4,159	1,078	6,068
2025	6,175	2,361	3,313	366	3,699
