= Cube::Hard =

English music engineer and record producer

Tom Wright, also known as Cube::Hard, Stargazer and Stereo Wildlife, among other aliases, is an English music engineer and record producer. Originally from Kent, England, he is currently taking a break from making music. He worked for RFUGrey as a producer in the late 2000s.

== History ==
Wright first got into DJing in 1993, and moved on to music production in 1999. He stated that "I'd rather make tracks than DJ because anyone can DJ".

His first releases were on Elation Recordings label under the alias Stargazer, and he had soon also released vinyl under his own label Phase Four. By 2002 he was making remixes for DJ Uplift's popular hardcore label Raw Elements while the Stargazer tracks "Released" and "Ultimate High" received recognition and were being remixed by producers such as CLSM and Breeze & Styles, and the Stargazer moniker started to get some awareness in the UK hardcore scene. A series of famous remixes for tracks such as "Undefined" and "John Peel (Not Enough)" established him a place as one of the hottest (and youngest) producers in hardcore.

Wright dropped the Stargazer alias in 2005 for Cube::Hard, stating it as a sign of a migration away from a career based mostly on engineering hardcore tracks. Though he was still considered a relatively new "artist", Cube::Hard started to get some awareness as a moniker in hardcore circles. Tracks featuring Cube::Hard appear in five places on the most recent Bonkers release, one of the most popular and long-running hardcore compilations in the UK. His tracks have also recently appeared in recent Hardcore Heaven and Wow (What A Rush) compilations.

== Producer ==
All of Wright's production and engineering is PC-based, and he assembles his tracks using Cubase. He has a BTEC in music technology, and contributes to his tracks variously as a keyboardist, drummer, and singer (notably with his recent track Micro).

He often works closely with many of the famous names in UK hardcore, notably Kevin Energy and Jon Doe (of CLSM). Of Jon Doe, Wright says, "I look up to Jon because he does the stuff I enjoy most in the scene and he is the one person who has given me real competition."

== Summary of releases ==
The following is a list of labels with contributions from Cube::Hard and his other aliases, not including those part of CD compilations. Tracks on some labels lack proper credentials and thus have not been included in this list.

As Cube::Hard

- RFUGrey
- Nukleuz
- Nu Energy
- D
- Dusk Till Dawn
- Whojamaflip
- Indiscriminate Records
- Madcow Records
- CLSM
- Lucky Breaks Records
- Hardcore Collections
- Bedlam Records
- Turbulence Hardcore

As Stargazer

- Coriolis Effect Records
- Raw Elements
- Indiscriminate Records
- G-Core
- Underground Recordings
- KFX
- Relentless Vinyl
- Elation Recordings
- Phase 4 Records
- Innervision Records

As Tom Wright

- Electrolysis Recordings
- RFU Grey
- Electronic Recordings
- Digital Beatz
- Coriolis Effect Records
- Innervision Records
