= Stargazer (The Tea Party song) =

Single by The Tea Party

from the album Seven Circles
- Released: November 2004
- Recorded: Orange Studios (Toronto)
- Genre: Rock
- Length: 3:24
- Label: EMI Music Canada
- Songwriter(s): The Tea Party
- Producer(s): Gavin Brown and Jeff Martin

The Tea Party singles chronology
"Writing's on the Wall" (2004)	"Stargazer" (2004)	"Oceans" (2005)

"Stargazer" is a song by Canadian rock band The Tea Party. It was released as a promotional single in Canada. The music video was shot in Toronto. It is a performance-style video shot with bluescreen imagery used with the intention of reflecting the grandiosity of the song.

"Stargazer" is a three-piece rock song which Jeff Burrows called "a good advertisement for the band".
