= Stargazer (Moodring album) =

- Vinyl cover

Studio album by Moodring
- Released: 10 June 2022
- Genres: Alternative metal; shoegaze; nu metal; grunge; electronica
- Length: 35:56
- Label: UNFD
- Producers: Hunter Young, Austin Coupe

Moodring chronology
showmetherealyou (2021)	Stargazer (2022)	YOUR LIGHT FADES AWAY (2023)

Moodring studio album chronology
Stargazer (2022)	Death Fetish (2026)

Singles from Stargazer
- 1. "Disintegrate" Released: January 20, 2022; 2. "Constrict" Released: March 20, 2022; 3. "SYNC.wav" Released: April 27, 2022

Stargazer is the debut studio album by American alternative metal band Moodring.

== Themes and composition ==
Songs from the album were released as singles as early as January 2022, however the album itself was first announced in April.

Lead vocalist Hunter Young states:

"We were excited to explore deeper themes and different aspects of our band throughout the full length. The album dives into our pool of influences unabashedly but resurfaces as its own entity. Each song was written with personal meaning and multiple themes, whilst remaining ambiguous and open enough for listeners to relate in their own way."

The song "Xeno (Foreign Love)" deals with breaking up a toxic relationship.

"N.I.K.E.", a reference to the song A.D.I.D.A.S. by Korn, concerns a conflict between two pastors attempting to cope with their attraction to each other, at odds with their religious teachings. Young explains:

"The lyrics are about fighting the taboos of dogma and judgement to love who you love and to be with the one you truly desire. After being forced into hiding for long enough, the characters in the song lose control. The tension has become too much to bear, coming together through what they've been taught is sin and blasphemy. But when they find each other all they feel is ecstasy."

Both the digital and physical (vinyl record) album cover features a golden snake moving through rose petals, which is a reference to Young's pet snake David Michael Fassbender. A spider ball python, such snakes suffer from a condition referred to as "spider wobble", resulting in a behaviour known as "stargazing".

An alternative metal album, many tracks also incorporate elements of electronica.

The release of the album was followed by a tour with Cane Hill, VCTMS and Afterlife.

== Reception ==
The album received generally very positive reviews. Prelude Press states the album "flows effortlessly from one song to the next without ever feeling repetitive or tired, and by the time it comes to an end, you’ll find yourself dying to listen to it all over again". Boolin Tunes states that it "cements itself as a debut to be proud of and one to return to time and time again".

The sound of the album has seen comparisons to Deftones and Glassjaw.

== Track listing ==
No.	Title	Length
1.	"How to Leave Painlessly"	0:54
2.	"Disintegrate"	4:00
3.	"Constrict"	3:19
4.	"Red Light Gossip"	3:08
5.	"Peel"	3:35
6.	"Stargazer"	3:46
7.	"N.I.K.E."	3:03
8.	"SYNC.wav"	3:21
9.	"Head in the Clouds"	3:12
10.	"Novocaine Bones"	3:41
11.	"Xeno (Foreign Love)"	3:53
Total length:		35:56

== Personnel ==
Moodring

- Hunter Young – vocals, guitar, production
- Kalan Adam – bass guitar
- Lindy Harter – drums, backing vocals
- Sean Dolich – guitar, backing vocals

Additional personnel

- Austin Coupe – production, engineering, mixing, mastering
- Steven Wang – photography
- Tim Minarzik – artwork
