= Stargazer (Carman novel) =

2008 novel by Patrick Carman

- The Land of Elyon - Book 4 - Stargazer
- Author: Patrick Carman
- Illustrator: Brad Weinman
- Language: English
- Series: The Land of Elyon
- Genre: Fantasy
- Publisher: Scholastic Corporation
- Publication date: 2008
- Publication place: United States
- Media type: Print (Hardback & Paperback)
- Pages: 288
- Preceded by: The Tenth City

Stargazer is a 2008 children's fantasy novel, the fifth book in the Land of Elyon series by American writer Patrick Carman. It takes place shortly after Into the Mist, in which Roland tells his story while they are sailing.

The audiobook is narrated by Ellen Archer.

== Plot ==
Alexa Daley, the protagonist, had only recently defeated the Abaddon (the main antagonist throughout the series)...or so she thought.

Abaddon was last seen falling back into the black pit in which he was contained, defeated along with Victor Grindall, one of Abaddon's underlings. Abaddon had taken on a new form, a metal serpent of the sea, harnessing the deadly power of electricity.

== Characters ==
The main character is Alexa Daley. Her father is Warvold, and her uncle is Roland.

== Books in this series ==
- Into the Mist (Prequel)
- The Dark Hills Divide (Book 1)
- Beyond the Valley of Thorns (Book 2)
- The Tenth City (Book 3)
- Stargazer (Book 4)
