= Mike Keneally discography =

This is the discography for American rock musician Mike Keneally.

== Primary studio albums ==
Year	Album	Artist
1992	hat.	Mike Keneally
1994	Boil That Dust Speck	Mike Keneally
1995	The Mistakes	The Mistakes
1997	Sluggo!	Mike Keneally & Beer for Dolphins
1999	Nonkertompf	Mike Keneally
2000	Dancing	Mike Keneally & Beer for Dolphins
2002	Wooden Smoke	Mike Keneally
2004	Dog	Mike Keneally Band
2004	The Universe Will Provide	Mike Keneally & Metropole Orkest
2009	Scambot 1	Mike Keneally
2010	Evidence of Humanity	Mike Keneally/Marco Minnemann
2012	Wing Beat Fantastic (Songs Written By Mike Keneally and Andy Partridge)	Mike Keneally
2013	You Must Be This Tall	Mike Keneally
2016	Scambot 2	Mike Keneally
2023	The Thing That Knowledge Can't Eat	Mike Keneally

== Companion titles ==
Year	Title	Description
1999	Nonkertalk	bonus disc with Nonkertompf Special Edition (OOP); now download
2000	Dancing With Myself ... And Others	bonus disc with Dancing Special Edition (OOP); now download
2002	Wooden Smoke Asleep	bonus disc with Wooden Smoke Special Edition (OOP); now download
2004	Pup	bonus disc with pre-order of Dog (OOP); now download
2004	Parallel Universe	companion album to The Universe Will Provide
2009	Stories and Songs Inspired by Scambot 1	bonus disc with Scambot 1 Special Edition
2009	The Scambot Holiday Special	companion download to Scambot 1
2010	Elements of a Manatee	companion download to Evidence of Humanity
2012	Wing Beat Elastic: Remixes, Demos and Unheard Music	companion album to Wing Beat Fantastic
2013	Live at Mama Kin	bonus disc with Sluggo! Superdeluxe Edition
2016	Inkling: More From the Scambot 2 Sessions	bonus disc with Scambot 2 Special Edition

== Covers album ==
Year	Title
2004	Vai Piano Reductions Vol. 1, Performed by Mike Keneally

== Live albums ==
Year	Title	Artist
1997	Half Alive in Hollywood	Mike Keneally & Beer for Dolphins
2005	Guitar Therapy Live	Mike Keneally Band
2011	Bakin' @ the Potato!	Mike Keneally Band
2013	Free EP Volume 1	Mike Keneally
2013	Free EP Volume 2	Mike Keneally
2025	MKAF ‘03 – Live Adventures in Europe	Mike Keneally & Friends

== Archival compilations ==
Year	Title	Description
1997	The Tar Tapes Vol. 1	sampler from The Tar Tapes cassette releases (OOP); now download
1998	The Tar Tapes Vol. 2	sampler from The Tar Tapes cassette releases (OOP); now download
2008	Wine and Pickles	rare and unreleased studio recordings 1998-2006
2014	Dancing Demos	download

== Videos and DVDs ==
- Soap Scum Remover VHS - 1996
- Dog Special Edition DVD - 2004
- Guitar Therapy Live Special Edition DVD - 2005
- hat. Special Edition DVD - 2007
- Boil That Dust Speck Special Edition DVD - 2007
- Bakin' @ the Potato DVD - 2010
- Evidence of Humanity DVD - 2010
- Sluggo! Deluxe Edition DVD - 2013

== Compilations featuring Mike Keneally ==
Year	Album	Track
1995	Tales From Yesterday: A View From the South Side of the Sky (Yes tribute album)	"Siberian Khatru" (as member of Stanley Snail)
1997	Giant Tracks: A Tribute to Gentle Giant	"No God's a Man"
2002	156 Strings: Nineteen Totally Original Acoustic Guitarists	"Thou Shalt Not Kill"
2003	A Fair Forgery of Pink Floyd	"Astronomy Domine"
2006	After the Storm: A Benefit Album for the Survivors of Hurricane Katrina	"Time Table" (Genesis cover)
2013	$100 Guitar Project	"Hi Ma"

== Frank Zappa recordings with Mike Keneally ==
- Broadway The Hard Way - 1988
- The Best Band You Never Heard In Your Life - 1991
- Make A Jazz Noise Here - 1991
- You Can't Do That on Stage Anymore, Vol. 4 - 1991
- You Can't Do That on Stage Anymore, Vol. 6 - 1992
- Trance-Fusion - 2006

== Recordings with other artists ==
Year	Artist	Album
1986	Burning Bridges	Yayo (Accretions flexi-disc)
1987	James Morton	Let’s Make Rhythm!
1990	Dweezil Zappa	Confessions
1991	Buddy Blue	Guttersnipes and Zealots
1991	Solomon Burke	Homeland
1991	Mark DeCerbo	Baby’s Not In The Mood
1991	Screamin' Jay Hawkins	Black Music For White People
1991	James Morton	Rock Studies For Drum Set
1991	Andy Prieboy	Montezuma Was A Man Of Faith (EP)
1991	Andy Prieboy	Blood and Concrete (Original Soundtrack)
1991	Earl Thomas	Blue Not Blues
1991	Zappa’s Universe	Zappa’s Universe
1993	Marc Bonilla	American Matador
1993	Screamin' Jay Hawkins	Stone Crazy
1993	Negativland	Negativconcertland (Bootleg CD)
1993	Z	Shampoohorn
1994	Screamin' Jay Hawkins	Somethin’ Funny Goin’ On
1994	Jip	Glee
1994	Marcelo Radulovich	Marcelo Radulovich
1994	Earl Thomas	Extra Soul
1994	Robert Vaughn and the Dead River Angels	Robert Vaughn and the Dead River Angels
1995	Kevin Gilbert	Supper’s Ready (Magna Carta Genesis tribute album compilation)
1995	Matthew Lien	Bleeding Wolves
1995	Stanley Snail	Tales From Yesterday (Magna Carta Yes tribute album compilation)
1995	Ultra 7	Trummerflora (Accretions compilation)
1995	Z	Music For Pets
1996	The Hooligans	Last Call
1997	Mark Craney & Friends	Something With a Pulse
1997	Faux Pas	This One’s For the Children
1997	The Ed Palermo Big Band	The Ed Palermo Big Band Plays the Music of Frank Zappa
1997	Steve Vai	G3: Live in Concert
1997	Steve Vai	Merry Axemas - A Guitar Christmas
1998	Chris Opperman	Oppy Music, Vol. 1: Purple, Crayon.
1998	Ultra 7	Trummerflora 2 (Accretions compilation)
1998	Steve Vai	Flex-Able Leftovers
1999	Mullmuzzler	Keep It To Yourself
1999	Mullmuzzler	Six Pack: Multi-Artist Radio Sampler
1999	Marcelo Radulovich	2 Brains
1999	Neil Sadler	theory of forms
1999	Kevin Gilbert, Stanley Snail	Tribute to the Titans (A Sampler of Great Performances from Magna Carta’s Tribute Series)
1999	Steve Vai	The Ultra Zone
2000	Screamin' Jay Hawkins	Best of the Bizarre Sessions: 1990-1994
2000	Screamin' Jay Hawkins	New Coat of Paint: Songs of Tom Waits
2000	Nigey Lennon & John Tabacco	Reinventing the Wheel
2000	The Loud Family	Attractive Nuisance
2000	Chris Opperman	Klavierstücke
2000	The Persuasions	Frankly A Cappella - The Persuasions Sing Zappa
2000	Steve Vai	The 7th Song, Enchanting Guitar Melodies (Archives Vol. 1)
2000	Dweezil Zappa	Automatic
2001	James LaBrie	MullMuzzler 2
2001	NDV (Nick D’Virgilio)	Karma
2001	Trummerflora Collective	No Stars Please
2001	Steve Vai	Alive In An Ultra World
2001	Lyle Workman	Tabula Rasa
2002	Napoleon Murphy Brock	Balls
2002	Steve Vai	The Elusive Light and Sound Vol. 1
2002	Andy West and Rama	Rama 1
2003	Bryan Beller	View
2003	Willie Oteri	Spiral Out
2003	Steve Vai	Mystery Tracks – Archives Vol. 3
2003	Steve Vai	The Infinite Steve Vai: An Anthology
2004	Ossi Duri	X
2004	Chris Opperman	Concepts of Non-Linear Time
2004	Henry Kaiser & Wadada Leo Smith	Yo Miles! Sky Garden
2004	Chain	chain.exe
2005	Anthony Curtis	Book of the Key
2005	Henry Kaiser & Wadada Leo Smith	Yo Miles! Upriver
2005	Chris Opperman	Beyond the Foggy Highway (Live 2002 - 2004)
2005	Mike Portnoy	Prime Cuts
2005	Ulver	Blood Inside
2005	Andy West and Rama	Drum Nation, Vol. 2
2007	Various Artists	Healing Force: The Songs of Albert Ayler
2007	Anthony Setola	Interstellar Appeal
2008	Bryan Beller	Thanks In Advance
2010	Joe Satriani	Black Swans and Wormhole Wizards
2011	Todd Grubbs	Return of the Worm
2011	Bryan Beller	Wednesday Night Live
2011	Chickenfoot	Chickenfoot III
2012	Joe Satriani	Satchurated: Live in Montreal
2012	Bear McCreary	Battlestar Galactica: Blood & Chrome Soundtrack
2013	Joe Satriani	Unstoppable Momentum
2013	Dethklok	The Doomstar Requiem - A Klok Opera Soundtrack
2015	Joe Satriani	Shockwave Supernova
2016	Steve Vai	Modern Primitive
2017	Mastodon	Emperor of Sand
2017	Carl King	Grand Architects of the Universe
2019	Devin Townsend	Empath
2019	Carl King	Oracle of Outer Space (voice of Dr. Zeroz)
