= Music for Pets =

Studio album by Z
- Released: 1996
- Genre: Rock
- Label: Zappa Records

Z chronology
Shampoohorn (1994)	Music for Pets (1996)	Automatic (2000)

Music for Pets is an album by the band Z, led by Dweezil and Ahmet Zappa, released in 1996.

The creation of the album was a troubled one, with multiple recording sessions interrupted by the death of Frank Zappa, the creation and recording of new material based on what was popular at the time, and delays in the release causing several versions to be released at various times. This resulted in the "French Version" the "US Version", and the "Bone-Us Version" which was a CD of out-takes and unreleased material. When all is counted, Music for Pets underwent over a year of recording sessions, five re-mixes, three different sequences, and at least three different main engineers.

The cover art is a parody of their previous effort, Shampoohorn, and the inner photograph and listing of dogs as "band members" Bing Jang on guitar and background vocals and Arkansas on bass guitar are pseudonyms and retribution for the firing of guitarist Mike Keneally due to the Zappas' reluctance to allow his own band, Mike Keneally & Beer for Dolphins (later called the Mike Keneally Band) to exist at the same time as Z. Bass guitarist Bryan Beller made the decision to leave the band in support of Keneally, with whom he also played bass guitar in Beer for Dolphins. This proved to be an important decision for both sidemen, as Keneally and Beller have continued to work together on Mike Keneally & Beer For Dolphins/The Mike Keneally Band releases, recording and touring together with guitarist Joe Satriani, in the live Dethklok band, Beller's solo albums View, Thanks In Advance, a live CD & DVD entitled Wednesday Night Live!, his instrumental power trio the Aristocrats along with guitarist Guthrie Govan and drummer Marco Minnemann, recording & touring with guitar virtuoso Steve Vai as well as various other recording and DVD projects, multiple American and European tours, as clinicians for Taylor Guitars, and finally as self-proclaimed musical soulmates. Z never released more material or played live again, essentially breaking up in 1997 with Dweezil focusing on several television projects such as the variety show Happy Hour with brother Ahmet and television and musical projects with then-girlfriend Lisa Loeb.

== French track listing ==
1. "Singer In The Woods"
2. "Pure"
3. "Here"
4. "Flibberty Jibbet"
5. "Coyote Face"
6. "What It B"
7. "Ask Yourself"
8. "Feminine S.D.H."
9. "Us"
10. "Not My Fault"
11. "With You"
12. "Evil"
13. "Based On A True Story"
14. "Music For Pets"
15. "Polar Bear"
16. "Happy Song"
17. "I Wants Me Gold"
18. "Boodledang"
19. "Chicken Out"
20. "Enigma"
21. "Badass"
22. "Silver Lady Disco"

== US track listing ==
1. "Silver Lady Disco"
2. "Coyote Face"
3. "True Face"
4. "Feminine SDH"
5. "Boodledang"
6. "Music For Pets"
7. "Us"
8. "Chicken Out"
9. "With You"
10. "Song For S"
11. "Father Time"
12. "Happiness"
13. "Pure"
14. "Mind Control"
15. "Flibberty Jibbet"
16. "Based On A True Story"
17. "Silver Lady"
18. "Choke"
19. "Singer In The Woods..." (with unlisted bonus track "Evil")

== "Bone-Us" track listing ==
1. "Badass"
2. "Enigma"
3. "Fuckin' Glad"
4. "Happy Song"
5. "I Wants Me Gold"
6. "You Used All My Soap"
7. "What It B"
8. "Ask Yourself"
9. "Polar Bear"
10. "The Finger"
11. "Not My Fault"
12. "Here"

Some versions of the "Bone-Us" release includes two additional songs inserted into the running order: "Farfignewton" as Track 8 and "Rice Pudding" as Track 13. The rest of the track listing is the same notwithstanding the two new songs.

== Personnel ==
- Ahmet Zappa – lead vocals
- Dweezil Zappa – lead guitar, lead and backing vocals
- Mike Keneally – rhythm guitar, backing vocals
- Bryan Beller – bass guitar
- Joe Travers – drums
