= Aristocrat (disambiguation) =

An aristocrat is typically a member of landed social class with inherited titles, heraldry and privileges.

Aristocrat and aristocracy can also refer to:

== Books, theatre, film and TV ==
- The Aristocrats, a 1901 novel by Gertrude Atherton
- The Aristocrat, a 1917 play by Louis N. Parker
- The Aristocrat, a 1927 memoir by Martin Boyd
- The Aristocrats, a 1977 novel by Gwen Davis
- Aristocrats, a 1979 play by Brian Friel
- Aristocrats: Caroline, Emily, Louisa, and Sarah Lennox, a 1994 biography by Stella Tillyard
- "The Aristocrats", a famous joke most often told by comedians to comedians
- The Aristocrats (film), a 2005 documentary film about the joke
- Aristocrats (TV series), a 1999 BBC television miniseries
- The Aristocrats (comics) (Italian: Gli Aristocratici), an Italian comic book series
- "The Aristocrat" (The Cleaner), a 2021 television episode

== Music ==
- Aristocrat Records, label active from 1947 to 1951, renamed to Chess Records
- The Aristocrats (band), a rock supergroup
  - The Aristocrats (album), an eponymous album
- "Aristocrat", song by Nü Sensae
- "Aristocrat", song by New Politics (band) written by Sam Hollander
- "Aristocrat", song by Poppy from Am I a Girl?
- "Aristocrats", song by Jacob Anderson

== Organisations ==
- Fredrikstad F.K., a Norwegian football club nicknamed "The Aristocrats"
- The Aristocrat restaurant chain, founded by chef Engracia Cruz-Reyes in Manila, the Philippines
- Aristocrat Leisure, a slot machine manufacturer

== Other ==
- Aristocrat (fashion), a fashion style from Japan
- Aristocrat, a liquor brand marketed by Heaven Hill

== See also ==
- Aristocracy, a form of government
- The Aristo-Cat, a 1943 Merrie Melodies cartoon directed by Chuck Jones
- The Aristocats, a 1970 animated feature film by Walt Disney Animation Studios
