= Erotic Cakes =

Studio album by Guthrie Govan
- Released: January 1, 2006
- Recorded: Headroom studios, North Hollywood.
- Genre: Progressive rock; jazz fusion; jazz rock; instrumental rock
- Length: 54:03
- Label: Cornford Records
- Producer: Jan Cyrka

Guthrie Govan chronology
Silent Nation (2004)	Erotic Cakes (2006)	The Aristocrats (2011)

Erotic Cakes is the first solo studio album by guitarist Guthrie Govan. It was first released in 2006 through Cornford Records and, it was later re-released by JTC records in 2011. The album features a mixture of songs that Govan had performed previously with his trio as well as some new compositions.

In an interview with All Out Guitar, he stated that, "these studio versions are a lot closer to what I meant the stuff to sound like when I wrote it". In the quote, he refers to the changes in arrangement made to the songs compared to his live work with his trio.

Govan has stated that the album name is a reference to the Simpsons' episode "Treehouse of Horror VI" during the segment "Homer^{3}".

== Background ==
Guthrie Govan is a well known guitarist because of his work with Asia as well as winning Guitarist magazine's "Guitarist of the Year" competition in 1993 with his composition "Wonderful Slippery Thing" which appears in this album. The songs "Waves" and "Rhode Island Shred" were featured in the compilation "Guitar on the Edge: Vol. 1 No. 4". "Sevens" and "Erotic cakes" were also composed before the album and played with his trio.

Govan himself has said that he was not very interested in releasing a solo album under the assumption that there was no market for it and because he himself could not fund it. That was when Paul Cornford pushed him to record and told him that he would personally fund it. Cornford then picked Jan Cyrka to produce and mix the album as well as getting a good studio for the guitars.

== Recording ==
The recording process took longer than expected originally. The drums were originally recorded in Pete Riley's old studio. The guitars were recorded in Govan's house by running his amp through a Palmer speaker simulator. The band intended to keep those tracks but, producer Jan Cyrka insisted that they should record the drums again, this time in a better studio. After they did that, the guitars that were recorded at Govan's home did not sound good enough by comparison. It was then when Paul Cornford decided to fly the band to Hollywood in order to record the guitars in Richie Kotzen's studio. This time, the guitars were recorded through mic'd loudspeakers in a wood room. The result was much better recorded guitar tracks than what was originally expected by Govan.

== Musical style ==
The album features Govan's ability to play multiple styles while keeping his own personal sound. Kevin Dawe refers to the way Guthrie utilizes guitar layering to create "dense musical settings and backings". He explains that Govan achieves this through the use of heterophony, multi-layered harmonies, varied chord voicings and dynamic rhythmic grooves. He also mentions how, in this album, Govan pushes the boundaries of guitar playing as well as exploring its place in the studio.

== Track listing ==
All music is composed by Guthrie Govan

No.	Title	Guest musician	Length
1.	"Waves"		5:08
2.	"Erotic Cakes"		3:50
3.	"Wonderful Slippery Thing"		3:20
4.	"Ner Ner"	Richie Kotzen	8:04
5.	"Fives"		4:35
6.	"Uncle Skunk"		5:28
7.	"Sevens"		5:56
8.	"Eric"		5:05
9.	"Slidey Boy"		4:34
10.	"Rhode Island Shred"	Ron "Bumblefoot" Thal	2:17
11.	"Hangover"		6:31
Total length:			54:03

== Personnel ==
Main musicians

- Guthrie Govan – guitar
- Seth Govan - bass
- Pete Riley - drums

Additional musicians

- Richie Kotzen - guitar on track 4
- Bumblefoot - guitar on track 10

Technical personnel

- Jan Cyrka - production, engineering, cover design
- Matthew Denny - mastering
- Alex Todorov - engineering
