= David Rufes =

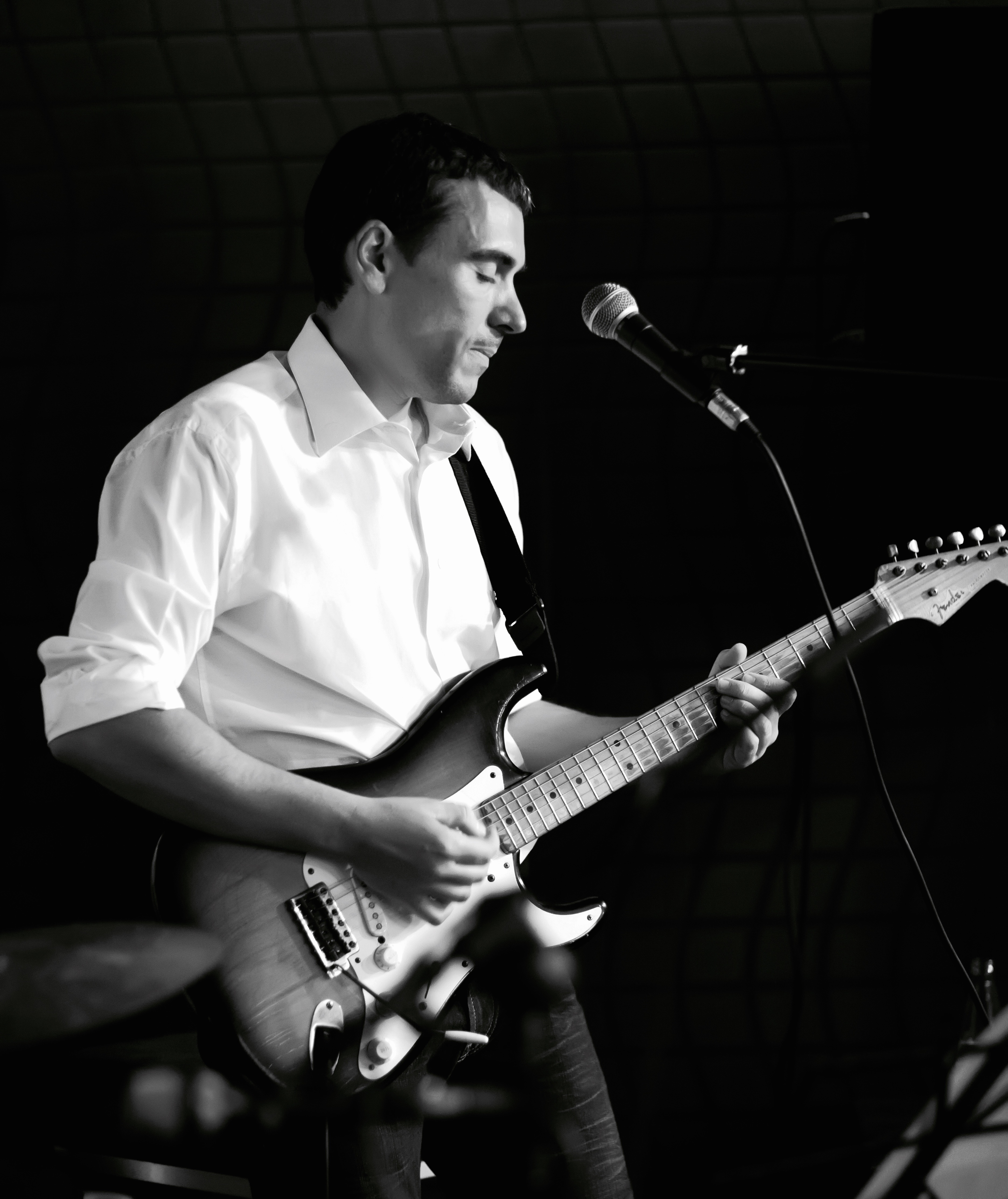

Background information
- Born: 5 November 1974 (age 51); Valencia, Spain
- Instruments: Guitar, Bass, Vocals
- Label: The Jazz Label
- Website: www.rufes.com

David Rufes (born 5 November 1974) is a Spanish session guitarist, vocalist and composer.

== Early years and musical influences ==
Rufes started playing music at the age of seven when he had received a Spanish guitar for his birthday. He bought his first electric guitar at the age of 12 after a whole year saving money. His early childhood musical influences included the Beatles, Chuck Berry and few years later the Ramones and Guns N' Roses.

== Career ==
After several years of playing several different styles of music, Rufes' musical career took off with his album Assorted Random Notes (2014). Just after releasing the album, he had the opportunity to share the stage with musicians such as Joe Satriani, the Aristocrats (Guthrie Govan, Bryan Beller and Marco Minnemann) or Mike Keneally.

He moved to the United States where he kept developing his own style while enjoying playing with artists including Daniel Ben Zebulon (Stevie Wonder, Richie Havens, Isaac Hayes... or Robben Ford. During his first year in the U.S. he composed his album The Night We Met, which was released in March 2017. A step forward in his career came as he moved into a relaxed and melodic jazz. For this record Rufes recorded all guitars, bass and percussion and had Pau Chafer playing keyboards, Paul Evans on the trumpet and Felipe Cucciardi playing drums.

In May 2017 the David Rufes Band was invited to play in the Coral Gables Blues Festival in Florida with blues musicians Juanita Dixon and Joey Gilmore.

== Current David Rufes Band line-up ==
In the U.S.:

- Rafael Figliuolo: bass
- Sandra Marquez: drums

In Spain:

- Carlos Ruso: drums
- Carlos Mar: bass

== Discography ==
- Toda hora llega (1999)
- Mental Tour (1999)
- Rufes (2006)
- Buenos Tiempos (2011)
- Assorted Random Notes (2014)
- The Night We Met (2017)
