= You Know What...? =

Studio album by The Aristocrats
- Released: June 28, 2019
- Recorded: March 2–12, 2019
- Studios: Brotheryn Studios, Ojai, California
- Genres: Jazz fusion; progressive rock
- Label: Boing!
- Producer: The Aristocrats

The Aristocrats chronology
| Secret Show: Live in Osaka (2015) | You Know What...? (2019) | FREEZE! Live In Europe 2020 (2021) |

You Know What...? is the fourth album by the Aristocrats, released on June 28, 2019. Keeping in tradition with the band's previous albums, each member contributed three songs out of nine in a variety of genres.

== Critical reception ==
Austin Kokel of Sonic Perspectives wrote that the album's "tight jams played with absolute precision and joy" are complemented by the songs' humorous titles, agreeing with the band that the album is the "best thing they've done together" and comparing them to the French jazz-rock band Mörglbl. Kokel singled out "Spiritus Cactus" as his favorite, calling it a "strange and unclassifiable thing" with its "orchestra hit stabs" and "guitar chord picking accentuated by castanet flourishes". Kokel adds that the quality of songwriting, melody, and composition on the album is admirable.

Daniel Levy of the Prog Report wrote that the Aristocrats "continue to put out excellent material in their 4th outing", comparing the album to being invited to a jam session.

== Track listing ==
| No. | Title | Music | Length |
|---|---|---|---|
| 1. | "D Grade Fuck Movie Jam" | Bryan Beller | 6:31 |
| 2. | "Spanish Eddie" | Guthrie Govan | 6:56 |
| 3. | "When We All Come Together" | Marco Minnemann | 6:16 |
| 4. | "All Said and Done" | Beller | 4:43 |
| 5. | "Terrible Lizard" | Govan | 6:30 |
| 6. | "Spiritus Cactus" | Minnemann | 5:59 |
| 7. | "The Ballad of Bonnie and Clyde" | Beller | 7:37 |
| 8. | "Burial at Sea" | Minnemann | 6:35 |
| 9. | "Last Orders" | Govan | 8:32 |
| Total length: | | | 59:42 |

== Personnel ==
- Guthrie Govan – guitar
- Bryan Beller – bass
- Marco Minnemann – drums
