= Live at The White House =

Live album by Kira Small & Bryan Beller
- Released: November 4, 2011
- Recorded: Timucua White House; Orlando, FL
- Genres: Soul, Neo-Progressive rock
- Length: 67:49
- Label: Mermaid Holler Records

Bryan Beller chronology
Wednesday Night Live (2011)	Live at The White House (2011)

Kira Small chronology
Raise My Voice (2010)	Live at The White House (2011)

Live at The White House is a live album by Kira Small and Bryan Beller. The album was released on November 4, 2011 and has songs ranging from Kira Small songs to others.

== Track listing ==
No.	Title	Writer(s)	Length
1.	"I Ain’t Never" (from Raise My Voice)	Kira Small	3:57
2.	"Make Up Your Mind" (from Raise My Voice)	Kira Small	3:45
3.	"Miss You Bad Tonight" (intro)		0:44
4.	"Miss You Bad Tonight" (from Love In A Dangerous World)	Kira Small	4:25
5.	"Ken & Jamie Are Lost" (from Raise My Voice)	Kira Small	2:02
6.	"You Gonna Regret Losing Me" (from Raise My Voice)	Kira Small	5:54
7.	"I Will Raise My Voice" (intro)		0:34
8.	"I Will Raise My Voice" (from Raise My Voice)	Kira Small	6:35
9.	"Hootchie Mama" (intro)		0:43
10.	"Hootchie Mama" (from Raise My Voice)	Kira Small	2:37
11.	"Wanderin’ Star" (from Wanderin’ Star)	Kira Small	4:17
12.	"Shouldn’t We Be In Love" (from Love In A Dangerous World)	Kira Small	4:02
13.	"Hurtin’" (from Raise My Voice)	Kira Small	4:25
14.	"Digging In the Dirt" (intro)		0:37
15.	"Digging In the Dirt"	Peter Gabriel	5:47
16.	"Sugar Man" (from Love In A Dangerous World)	Kira Small	4:25
17.	"Backwoods" (intro)		0:52
18.	"Backwoods" (from View)	Bryan Beller	3:56
19.	"Thank You Benoit"		0:46
20.	"Ain’t No Sunshine"	Bill Withers	2:40
21.	"I Can’t Stand the Rain"	Ann Peebles	4:46
Total length:			67:49

== Personnel ==
- Kira Small - vocals, keyboards
- Bryan Beller - bass
