= Levin Minnemann Rudess =

Studio album by Tony Levin, Marco Minnemann & Jordan Rudess
- Released: September 5, 2013
- Genres: Progressive rock, instrumental rock, experimental metal
- Length: 62:00
- Label: Lazy Bones Recordings
- Producers: Scott Schorr, Tony Levin

Tony Levin, Marco Minnemann & Jordan Rudess chronology
Levin Minnemann Rudess (2013)	From the Law Offices of Levin Minnemann Rudess (2016)

Professional ratings
Review scores
Source	Rating
Huffington Post	5/5

Levin Minnemann Rudess or LMR is a debut collaboration album by two members of Liquid Tension Experiment: bassist Tony Levin (King Crimson, Peter Gabriel, Stick Men) and Dream Theater keyboardist Jordan Rudess, with drummer Marco Minnemann (Steven Wilson, The Aristocrats, Joe Satriani). It was released on September 5, 2013, by Lazy Bones Recordings.

== Track listing ==
All tracks are written by Levin, Minnemann, Rudess.

No.	Title	Length
1.	"Marcopolis"	4:53
2.	"Twitch"	3:08
3.	"Frumious Banderfunk"	3:39
4.	"The Blizzard"	3:43
5.	"Mew"	7:49
6.	"Afa Vulu"	2:44
7.	"Descent"	3:24
8.	"Scrod"	6:10
9.	"Orbiter"	3:13
10.	"Enter The Core"	4:08
11.	"Ignorant Elephant"	5:30
12.	"Lakeshore Lights"	4:36
13.	"Dancing Feet"	3:05
14.	"Service Engine"	8:38
Total length:		62:00

== Personnel ==
- Jordan Rudess - keyboards, continuum, wizardly sounds, seaboard
- Tony Levin - basses, Chapman Stick, cello
- Marco Minnemann - drums, guitars
