= Sir Millard Mulch =

American musician

Sir Millard Mulch, real name Carl King (often incorrectly referred to as Paul Mavanu from a satirical e-book based on his album of the same name that used that alias), (born Willoughby, Ohio) is a musician who has worked with Virgil Donati and Devin Townsend. He is the creator of a four-hour album called, How To Sell The Whole F#@!ing Universe To Everybody, Once And For All! co-released through Mimicry Records in 2005, a record label owned by Trey Spruance of Mr. Bungle. He has released various EPs and albums earlier including The De-Evolution of Yasmine Bleeth in 2001.

From 2006 to 2010 he worked under the pseudonym Dr. Zoltan Øbelisk. In 2010 he released a 5-minute drum-battle with Marco Minnemann, in which the two trade complex polyrhythmic drum solos, through a blend of Drumkit From Hell programming and live performance.

He is the author of the book, So, You're A Creative Genius... Now What? which was released in June 2011 by MWP, publishers of The Writer's Journey: Mythic Structure For Writers and Hardware Wars.

In 2012, he directed a feature-length documentary about Swedish drummer Morgan Ågren, with guest appearances by Dweezil Zappa, Brendon Small of Metalocalypse, Devin Townsend, Danny Carey of Tool, and Dave Elitch of The Mars Volta.

In 2014, he was a producer on the feature-length documentary Apocalypse Later: Harold Camping vs. The End of the World about Family Radio Host Harold Camping, directed by Zeke Piestrup. The film stars Bart Ehrman and includes an interview in which Harold Camping apologizes for being wrong about his May 21, 2011 End Times prediction.

He worked as Cinematographer on The Death of "Superman Lives": What Happened? directed by Jon Schnepp of Metalocalypse, and starring Kevin Smith and Tim Burton, released in 2015 on Showtime.

In 2019, he created, wrote, and directed the animated TV pilot The Oracle of Outer Space starring Dweezil Zappa and Jon Schnepp of Metalocalypse. It also featured voice acting by Frank Zappa / Devin Townsend guitarist Mike Keneally. It won two Silver Telly Awards for Writing and Voiceover.

His 2020 animated pilot That Monster Show featured a cameo from Mark Borchardt of American Movie.
