= Culture Clash =

Culture Clash may refer to:

- Cultural conflict
- Culture Clash (performance troupe), American performance troupe
- Culture Clash (album), by The Aristocrats
- Culture Clash (band), British band that plays Harare Jit music
- The Mole: Culture Clash, Australian television series
