= Rufe =

Rufe may refer to:

== People ==
=== Surname ===
- Cynthia M. Rufe (born 1948), United States District Court judge
- Jake Rufe (born 1996), American soccer player

=== Forename or nickname ===
- Rufus Travis Amis (1912-2007), American entrepreneur
- Rufus Rufe Clarke (1900-1983), American Major League Baseball pitcher
- Rufe Davis (1908-1974), American actor
- James Ruffus Rufe Gentry (1918-1997), American Major League Baseball pitcher
- Henry "Rufe" Johnson (1908-1974), American Piedmont blues guitarist, pianist, singer and songwriter
- Rufe Persful (1906-1991), American criminal
- Wilmer R. Waters (1914-1995), American politician

== Other uses ==
- Allied World War II reporting name for the Nakajima A6M2-N Japanese floatplane
- Rufe, Oklahoma, United States, an unincorporated community

== See also ==
- Rufes, a surname
