= The Night We Met (disambiguation) =

"The Night We Met" is a 2015 song by Lord Huron.

The Night We Met may also refer to:

== Music ==
- The Night We Met, a 2007 album by David Rufes

=== Songs ===
- "The Night We Met" (HomeTown song), 2015
- "The Night We Met", a 1995 song by Julian Schnabel off the album Every Silver Lining Has a Cloud
- "Night We Met", a 2024 single by Nolan Sotillo
- "Retrey Yung Joup Knea" (Khmer: The Night We Met), a Cambodian rock song released on the 1996 album Cambodian Rocks

== Literature ==
- The Night We Met, a 2002 novel by Rob Byrnes
- The Night We Met, a 2007 multi-author anthology with Julie Kenner, Jo Leigh, Nancy Warren (author)

== Film, television ==
- The Night We Met, a 2015 film directed by Jon Russell Cring
- "The Night We Met", 2006 season 2 number 8 episode 30 of TV show Ghost Whisperer season 2

== See also ==
- The Night We Never Met, a 1992 film by Warren Leight
