= Culture Clash Live! =

Live album by The Aristocrats
- Released: January 20, 2015
- Recorded: January – August 2014
- Genre: Progressive rock, progressive metal
- Length: 161:40
- Label: Boing!
- Producer: The Aristocrats

The Aristocrats chronology
| Culture Clash (2013) | Culture Clash Live! (2015) | Secret Show: Live in Osaka (2015) |

Culture Clash Live! is the second live album by The Aristocrats, released on January 20, 2015. The material for this live release was recorded at six different venues in six countries during the 2014 world tour supporting the band's second studio album Culture Clash. The album will be released as a CD/DVD package. Only three tracks are the same performance on both discs, all others are "unique, giving fans a chance to hear how the songs evolved while on tour".

== Track listing ==
=== CD ===
| No. | Title | Music | Length |
|---|---|---|---|
| 1. | "Sweaty Knockers" (^{[a]}) | Bryan Beller | 8:49 |
| 2. | "Ohhhh Noooo" (^{[a]}) | Marco Minnemann | 7:44 |
| 3. | "Get It Like That" (^{[a]}) | Minnemann | 9:45 |
| 4. | "Culture Clash" (^{[a]}) | Guthrie Govan | 7:59 |
| 5. | "Gaping Head Wound" (^{[a]}) | Govan | 6:30 |
| 6. | "Louisville Stomp" (^{[c]}) | Beller | 5:21 |
| 7. | "Desert Tornado" (^{[e]}) | Minnemann | 5:42 |
| 8. | "Living the Dream" (^{[d]}) | Beller | 8:23 |
| Total length: | | | 60:10 |

=== DVD ===
| No. | Title | Music | Length |
|---|---|---|---|
| 1. | "Furtive Jack" (^{[f]}) | Govan | 10:09 |
| 2. | "Ohhhh Noooo" (^{[e]}) | Minnemann | 10:03 |
| 3. | "Louisville Stomp" (^{[c]}) | Beller | 8:06 |
| 4. | "Get It Like That" (^{[f]}) | Minnemann | 14:04 |
| 5. | "Culture Clash" (^{[e]}) | Govan | 11:43 |
| 6. | "Blues Fuckers" (^{[b]}) | Minnemann | 17:16 |
| 7. | "Gaping Head Wound" (^{[b]}) | Govan | 8:53 |
| 8. | "Desert Tornado" (^{[e]}) | Minnemann | 7:28 |
| 9. | "Living the Dream" (^{[d]}) | Beller | 13:48 |
| Total length: | | | 101:30 |

Notes

- ^{^[a]} Recorded at The Center Theater, Whittier, California on January 25, 2014.
- ^{^[b]} Recorded at Centro Cultural Roberto Cantoral, Mexico City, Mexico on January 28, 2014.
- ^{^[c]} Recorded at Band on the Wall, Manchester, UK on February 20, 2014.
- ^{^[d]} Recorded at De Boerderij, Zoetermeer, Netherlands on February 28, 2014.
- ^{^[e]} Recorded at Askra Theater, Bangkok, Thailand on August 17, 2014.
- ^{^[f]} Recorded at Club Citta, Tokyo, Japan on August 19, 2014.

=== DVD extras ===
- Behind the scenes tour at Tokyo venue
- Drum solo by Minnemann with switchable camera angles
- Song demos from Culture Clash album

== Personnel ==
- Guthrie Govan – guitar
- Bryan Beller – bass
- Marco Minnemann – drums
