= The Secret Jewel Box =

Box set by Steve Vai
- Released: December 11, 2001
- Recorded: 1980–?
- Genre: Progressive rock Hard rock Instrumental rock
- Length: ??
- Label: Light Without Heat
- Producer: Steve Vai

Steve Vai chronology
The 7th Song, Enchanting Guitar Melodies (Archives Vol. 1) (2000)	The Secret Jewel Box (2001)	FZ Original Recordings; Steve Vai (Archives Vol. 2) (2001)

The Secret Jewel Box is a ten-CD box set, a collection of music by guitarist Steve Vai, released in 2001. Vai's website describes it as "not a compilation of Vai's catalog, but rather something far more conceptual. The series includes soundtracks, rarities, outtakes and oddities, out of print albums, Vai’s recordings with Frank Zappa and with early bands Alcatrazz and The Classified, acoustic piano interpretations of Vai songs, even an eclectic audio art project."

The box and the first three CDs were released in 2001, with only 10,000 boxes having been manufactured. Those who purchased the box were to be notified when the remaining CDs were ready. The 100-page booklet was to be sent out to those who had collected all 10 CDs after the last CD was produced. It was 13 years between the release of Disc 6 (2004) and Disc 7 (2017).

== Content ==
Volume	Year	Album	Info
01	2001	The Elusive Light and Sound Vol. 1	Included in Box, Re-released as separate CD in 2002
02	2001	Alcatrazz - "Disturbing the Peace"	Included & Only in this Box
03	2001	Frank Zappa Original Recordings; Steve Vai (Archives, Vol. 2)	Included & Only in this Box
04	2003	Mystery Tracks (Archives Vol. 3)	
05	2003	Various Artists (Archives Vol. 4)	
06	2004	"Vai: Piano Reductions, Vol. 1" (by Mike Keneally)	
07	2017	Steve Vai & The Classified - Modern Primitive	
08 & 09		"Alcatrazz: Panic Jungle [Live In Japan]"	
10		"Hot Chunks" (turned out to be Vai/Gash)	

== Production ==
- Producer – Eddie Kramer (tracks: 2-1 to 2-11)
- Engineer, Mixed By – Eddie Kramer (tracks: 2-1 to 2-11), John Begoshian (tracks: 2-1 to 2-11), Paul Levy (tracks: 2-1 to 2-11)
- Engineer [Assisted By], Mixed By [Assisted By] – Brian Leshon (tracks: 2-1 to 2-11), Brian Scheuble (tracks: 2-1 to 2-11), Mark Wilczak (tracks: 2-1 to 2-11), Paul Lani (tracks: 2-1 to 2-11), Ross Stien (tracks: 2-1 to 2-11)
- Mastered By – George Marino (tracks: 2-1 to 2-11), Neil Citron (tracks: 1-1 to 1-40), Steve Vai (tracks: 1-1 to 1-40)
- Photography [2nd Disc Logo] – Steve Crise
- Photography [2nd Disc] – Ron Slenzak
- Written-By, Composed By, Producer, Arranged By, Performer – Frank Zappa (tracks: 3-1 to 3-17)
- Arranged By – Steve Vai (tracks: 2-1 to 2-11)
- Artwork By [1st Disc] – Steve Vai
- Artwork By [2nd Disc Design] – Dyer/Kahn, Inc., Tim Owens
- Artwork By [2nd Disc Metal Logo Sculpture] – Nicholas Fasciano
- Artwork By [3rd Disc Art Direction] – Ciruelo Cabral, Gail Zappa, Priscila Bara, Steve Vai
