= Illogicist =

Italian death metal band

Illogicist is an Italian technical death metal band.

The band hails from Aosta. Their first two demos Polymorphism of Death (2002) and Dissonant Perspectives (2003) were followed by their debut album Subjected in 2004.

Norway's Scream Magazine scored the album "a strong 4" out of 6. The music and vocals were reminiscient of Human and Individual Thought Patterns-era Death, with the bassist standing out, whilst the drummer (who was a session musician) played more straightforwardly.

The follow-up album was The Insight Eye, issued in 2007 on Willowtip Records. Marco Minnemann was the drummer for this record. Exclaim! found The Insight Eye "tremendously captivating" and deemed the "record likely to remain in heavy rotation". While the band at times veered into "performing ritualistic Schuldiner worship", but also brought enough originality and "ingenuity". Metal.de also rated it highly, calling the songs "well-crafted, strangely off-putting at first, yet ultimately alluring and captivating". The reviewer also found "a great deal" of emotion in the songs, namely "sorrow and frustration", with a "black" (rather than red) thread running throughout. The production and mastering were also "excellent" and "top notch". Powermetal.de concurred that there were melancholic undertones and a dark atmosphere; the sophisticated music "ultimately brings a sense of well-being to the metal-loving listener after a certain adjustment period". The drumming was of very high quality, and with Minnemann not continuing with Illogicist, the playing on The Insight Eye would be hard to replicate. "Only the vocals could have been a bit better", the reviewer opined.

Vampster however found the music "soulless". It was "death metal of a very high caliber" and with "incredibly impressive" musicianship, but with "nothing catchy". Illogicist had apparently forgotten "to infuse the music with emotion" and was also "strikingly similar to" Death. Rock Hard only scored the album 5 out of 10. Noise.fi was a bit higher with its 3 out of 5.

The Unconsciousness Of Living followed as the group's third album in 2011. Rock Hard rated this album marginally better than the previous, as 6 out of 10.
