= Shockwave Supernova =

Studio album by Joe Satriani
- Released: July 24, 2015
- Studios: Skywalker Sound, Lucas Valley, Marin County, California, US; 25th St. Recording, Oakland, California, US
- Genre: Instrumental rock
- Length: 64:12
- Label: Sony Music
- Producers: Joe Satriani; John Cuniberti

Joe Satriani chronology
Unstoppable Momentum (2013)	Shockwave Supernova (2015)	What Happens Next (2018)

Shockwave Supernova is the fifteenth studio album by guitarist Joe Satriani, released on July 24, 2015, through Sony Music Entertainment. It features bassist Bryan Beller and drummer Marco Minnemann of The Aristocrats, as well as progressive rock multi-instrumentalist Mike Keneally.

== Critical reception ==
Professional ratings
Review scores
Source	Rating
AllMusic	4/5 stars
PopMatters	8/10 stars

Stephen Thomas Erlewine at AllMusic calls Shockwave Supernova "proud egghead music that grooves on its own technical acumen" and that it "feels like a collaborative record; it's as fun to hear [Satriani] play with his band as it is to hear him soar on his own."

Jedd Beaudoin at PopMatters gave the album eight stars out of ten, describing it as "one of Satch's most memorable adventures" and "a record that will please the casual listener as much as the musical scholar". Praise was also given to the "crazy good" rhythm section of Minnemann and Beller, with Beaudoin saying that he hopes for Satriani to release a live album featuring the two musicians.

== Track listing ==
All tracks are written by Joe Satriani.

No.	Title	Length
1.	"Shockwave Supernova"	3:53
2.	"Lost in a Memory"	4:16
3.	"Crazy Joey"	3:39
4.	"In My Pocket"	4:15
5.	"On Peregrine Wings"	5:25
6.	"Cataclysmic"	5:05
7.	"San Francisco Blue"	3:22
8.	"Keep on Movin'"	4:26
9.	"All of My Life"	4:05
10.	"A Phase I'm Going Through"	4:02
11.	"Scarborough Stomp"	4:03
12.	"Butterfly and Zebra"	1:47
13.	"If There Is No Heaven"	5:10
14.	"Stars Race Across the Sky"	4:48
15.	"Goodbye Supernova"	5:47
Total length:		64:12

== Personnel ==
- Joe Satriani – guitar, keyboard, bass (track 6), harmonica, production, arrangement, additional recording
- Mike Keneally – keyboard, additional rhythm guitar (track 2)
- Marco Minnemann – drums (tracks 1, 2, 5–7, 9, 10, 13–15)
- Vinnie Colaiuta – drums (tracks 3, 4, 8, 11)
- Bryan Beller – bass (tracks 1, 2, 5, 7, 10, 12, 14, 15)
- Chris Chaney – bass (tracks 3, 4, 8, 11)
- Bobby Vega – bass (track 9)
- Tony Menjivar – percussion (track 9), congas, bongos
- John Cuniberti – percussion (tracks 1–3, 5, 6, 14), producing, recording, mixing, mastering
- Mike Fraser – additional recording, co-producing
- Robert Gatley – Skywalker assistant
- Judy Kirschner – Skywalker assistant
- Dann Michael Thompson – Skywalker assistant
- Scott Bergstrom – 25th Street Recording assistant

== Charts ==
Chart (2015)	Peak position
Australian Albums (ARIA)	23
Belgian Albums (Ultratop Flanders)	53
Belgian Albums (Ultratop Wallonia)	67
Czech Albums (ČNS IFPI)	16
Dutch Albums (Album Top 100)	11
Finnish Albums (Suomen virallinen lista)	34
French Albums (SNEP)	32
German Albums (Offizielle Top 100)	40
Hungarian Albums (MAHASZ)	23
Italian Albums (FIMI)	47
Scottish Albums (Official Charts)	13
Swiss Albums (Schweizer Hitparade)	13
UK Albums (Official Charts)	22
UK Album Downloads (Official Charts)	54
UK Progressive Albums (Official Charts)	4
UK Rock & Metal Albums (Official Charts)	3
US Billboard 200	46
US Top Hard Rock Albums (Billboard)	3
US Top Rock Albums (Billboard)	4
