= 24 Tales =

Studio album by Alex Machacek with Marco Minnemann
- Released: 2010
- Genre: Jazz fusion
- Length: 50:39
- Label: Abstract Logix; ABLX 024

Alex Machacek chronology
The Official Triangle Sessions (2009)	24 Tales (2010)	FAT (2012)

24 Tales is an album by guitarist Alex Machacek which is based on a 51-minute drum solo by German drummer Marco Minnemann. It was released in 2010 by Abstract Logix. Machacek's wife Sumitra Nanjundan provides vocals on one track, and trombonist Martin Ptak appears on three tracks.

In 2006, Minnemann, who was later Machacek's bandmate in Eddie Jobson's UKZ band, recorded a 51-minute drum solo and shared it with other musicians, requesting that they use it as the basis for new compositions and recordings that would collectively come to be known as the Normalizer 2 project. The resulting albums included Mike Keneally's Evidence of Humanity, Trey Gunn's Modulator, and 24 Tales.

Machacek chose to divide Minnemann's recording into 24 sections which are heard without pause on the CD, and for which he composed music in a wide variety of styles, as reflected in the track titles. He later commented: "There are some improvised solos and some comping but the majority of this album is composed. And that was done intentionally – I always thought of this record as a compositional project."

== Reception ==
Professional ratings
Review scores
Source	Rating
AllMusic	3/5 stars
All About Jazz	5/5 stars
All About Jazz	5/5 stars

In a review for AllMusic, Michael G. Nastos wrote: "While the music is complex, minimalist, or even kinetic, it is far from tame or commonplace... While some might find this lacking in cohesion and true communality, there's a good spirit present, listenable and tuneful in spots, and inspired for many others."

John Kelman of All About Jazz awarded the album a full 5 stars, calling it "a true fusion masterpiece" and "a sure-fire contender for one of 2010's best," and praising its "cohesive depth without gravitas or self-indulgence." AAJ's Ian Patterson also awarded the album 5 stars, stating: "This recording endlessly demonstrates that Machacek is able to merge breathtaking improvisation and serious composition in an altogether unique and spellbinding way."

Vince Lewis of Guitar International commented: "Fans of high energy fusion should enjoy this recording. It certainly is a non stop journey, and almost symphonic despite its rock and roll roots. The total experience is certainly interesting, thought provoking and not for the casual listener."

Writing for The Guitar Column, Clinton Carnegie remarked: "24 Tales proves that Machacek is not just another fusion guitar virtuoso but also a composer of incredible imagination and amazing compositional chops as he navigates his writing around a virtual minefield of Minnemann's ever-changing rhythms."

== Track listing ==
1. "On Your Marks..." – 3:25
2. "Sit Back and Chillax" – 1:51
3. "Tour De France" – 2:16
4. "Dancing with the Baby Bear" – 1:28
5. "Anamika" – 4:05
6. "Pros and Cons of Depression" – 1:07
7. "Little Man" – 0:30
8. "Tranquillo" – 1:27
9. "Tranquilizer" – 1:00
10. "Sweet Torture" – 4:37
11. "She Likes It" – 0:27
12. "See You There" – 0:55
13. "X-Mas" – 0:27
14. "Feel Me!" – 2:28
15. "At the Club" – 3:51
16. "Eau de Conlon" – 2:03
17. "Doldrums" – 1:03
18. "Minnemaus in da House" – 1:36
19. "Run, Fusion!" – 2:42
20. "Air" – 1:17
21. "Sexy" – 2:28
22. "Blender" – 2:14
23. "Quotes" – 2:56
24. "Over and Out" – 4:34

== Personnel ==
- Alex Machacek – guitars, everything else
- Marco Minnemann – drums
- Sumitra Nanjundan – vocals (track 2)
- Martin Ptak – trombone (tracks 12, 13, 15)
