= Boing, We'll Do It Live! =

Live album by The Aristocrats
- Released: December 10, 2012
- Recorded: June 2–3, 2012 at Alvas Showroom, San Pedro, California
- Genre: Progressive rock, progressive metal
- Length: 134:41
- Label: Boing!
- Producer: The Aristocrats

The Aristocrats chronology
| The Aristocrats (2011) | Boing, We'll Do It Live! (2012) | Culture Clash (2013) |

Boing, We'll Do It Live! is the first live album of The Aristocrats, released on December 10, 2012. Footage and sound for this release were recorded in two concerts held at Alvas Showroom in Los Angeles, California. During those concerts the band played material from their debut album as well as songs from each band members' solo projects. The album was released on double-CD and DVD. The deluxe edition consists of both the DVD and the two CDs including two bonus tracks not featured on standard editions.

== Track listing ==
=== Disc 1 ===
| No. | Title | Music | Length |
|---|---|---|---|
| 1. | "Bad Asteroid" | Guthrie Govan | 7:14 |
| 2. | "Greasy Wheel" | Bryan Beller | 7:52 |
| 3. | "Boing!... I'm in the Back" | Marco Minnemann | 8:07 |
| 4. | "Flatlands" | Beller | 8:31 |
| 5. | "I Want a Parrot" | Govan | 10:00 |
| 6. | "Blues Fuckers/Drum Solo" | Minnemann | 15:30 |
| 7. | "Waves" | Govan | 5:50 |
| Total length: | | | 63:04 |

=== Disc 2 ===
| No. | Title | Music | Length |
|---|---|---|---|
| 1. | "Get It Like That" | Minnemann | 11:25 |
| 2. | "Furtive Jack" | Govan | 7:47 |
| 3. | "Train Trax" | Minnemann | 4:48 |
| 4. | "Cave Dweller" | Beller | 8:10 |
| 5. | "Mr. Kempinski" | Minnemann | 7:07 |
| 6. | "See You Next Tuesday" (on deluxe edition only) | Beller | 5:08 |
| 7. | "Dance of the Aristocrats" | Minnemann | 5:54 |
| 8. | "A Very Metal Introduction" | | 1:59 |
| 9. | "Sweaty Knockers" | Beller | 11:28 |
| 10. | "Erotic Cakes" (on deluxe edition only) | Govan | 7:44 |
| Total length: | | | 71:37 |

=== DVD features ===
- Complete show, including bonus tracks and additional between song footage
- 5.1 surround mix by Steven Wilson
- Bonus audio from soundcheck
- Interviews with each band member

== Personnel ==
- Guthrie Govan – guitar
- Bryan Beller – bass
- Marco Minnemann – drums

== See also ==
- Fuck It, We'll Do It Live
