= FZ Original Recordings; Steve Vai Archives, Vol. 2 =

2001 compilation album by Steve Vai

Frank Zappa - FZ Original Recordings; Steve Vai Archives, Vol. 2

Compilation album by Steve Vai
- Released: December 11, 2001
- Recorded: 1980–1985
- Genre: Progressive rock
- Length: 74:06
- Label: Light Without Heat

Steve Vai chronology
The Secret Jewel Box (2001)	Frank Zappa - FZ Original Recordings; Steve Vai Archives, Vol. 2 (2001)	The Elusive Light and Sound Vol. 1 (2002)

FZ Original Recordings is a compilation album by Steve Vai, released on his own Light Without Heat label in 2001. It features recordings of Frank Zappa's ensemble during Vai's three years as a member, where he was credited not just as "guitarist" but as wielder of "strat abuse" and "impossible guitar parts". The recordings on the album were written and produced by Zappa and it was authorized by the Zappa Family Trust. It first appeared as part of The Secret Jewel Box set, also released in 2001.

The booklet contains the original liner notes for each Zappa track, along with Vai's comments on each track.

== Track listing ==
All songs written by Frank Zappa

No.	Title	Original release	Length
1.	"Tell Me You Love Me"	Tinsel Town Rebellion	2:07
2.	"Theme From 3rd Movement Of Sinister Footwear"	You Are What You Is	3:31
3.	"Jumbo Go Away"	You Are What You Is	3:43
4.	"Drowning Witch"	Ship Arriving Too Late to Save a Drowning Witch	12:03
5.	"Envelopes"	Ship Arriving Too Late to Save a Drowning Witch	2:46
6.	"Teen-Age Prostitute"	Ship Arriving Too Late to Save a Drowning Witch	2:40
7.	"The Jazz Discharge Party Hats"	The Man from Utopia	4:28
8.	"Ya Hozna"	Them or Us	6:26
9.	"Alien Orifice"	Frank Zappa Meets the Mothers of Prevention	4:12
10.	"Approximate" (Recorded live in the summer of 1982 in Pistoia, Italy)	You Can't Do That on Stage Anymore, Vol. 4	1:49
11.	"I'm a Beautiful Guy"	You Are What You Is	1:56
12.	"Beauty Knows No Pain"	You Are What You Is	3:01
13.	"What's New In Baltimore?"	Frank Zappa Meets the Mothers of Prevention	5:04
14.	"Moggio" (Recorded live in the summer of 1982, European tour)	You Can't Do That on Stage Anymore, Vol. 5	2:29
15.	"RDNZL" (Recorded live in the summer of 1982, European tour)	You Can't Do That on Stage Anymore, Vol. 5	7:59
16.	"Magic Fingers" (Recorded live 12/11/80, Santa Monica Civic Auditorium Santa Monica CA)	You Can't Do That on Stage Anymore, Vol. 6	2:21
17.	"Strictly Genteel" (Recorded live 10/31/81, The Palladium, New York NY)	You Can't Do That on Stage Anymore, Vol. 6	7:08
