= Shampoohorn =

Studio album by Z
- Released: 1993
- Genre: Rock
- Label: Barking Pumpkin Records

Z chronology
Shampoohorn (1993)	Music For Pets (1996)

Dweezil Zappa chronology
Confessions (1991)	Shampoohorn (1993)	Automatic (2000)

Shampoohorn is an album by Dweezil and Ahmet Zappa, under the group name Z, released in 1993.

The European version of the album was released months before the American version. Between the release of the two versions, Dweezil Zappa fired longtime Zappa bassist Scott Thunes due to inter-band conflicts; subsequently, the band hired bassist Bryan Beller, a Berklee honors graduate based on the recommendation of drummer Joe Travers (who had played extensively with Beller at Berklee) and an exhausting 5-day audition. After this change, the band continued to record. As a result, the European version of the album differs from the American version, which replaces "What Went Wrong In The Real World?", and "Bellybutton" with "In My Mind" and "My Beef Mailbox", both featuring Beller on bass.

== Track listing ==
1. "Singer In The Woods"
2. "In My Mind"
3. "Did I Mention It Was Huge?"
4. "Jesus Clone"
5. "Loser"
6. "Kidz Cereal"
7. "Mommy"
8. "Dreaming"
9. "Rubberband"
10. "Mountains On The Moon"
11. "Lucky Jones"
12. "Leviathan"
13. "Doomed To Be Together"
14. "My Beef Mailbox"
15. "Them"
16. "Shampoohorn"
