= Thanks in Advance =

Studio album by Bryan Beller
- Released: November 25, 2008
- Genre: Progressive Rock, Progressive metal, Neo-Progressive rock
- Length: 60:00
- Label: Onion Boy Records
- Producer: Bryan Beller

Bryan Beller chronology
View (2003)	Thanks in Advance (2008)	Wednesday Night Live (2011)

Professional ratings
Review scores
Source	Rating
Allmusic.com	4/5 stars

Thanks in Advance is the second album by bassist Bryan Beller, known for his work with Mike Keneally, Steve Vai and Dethklok. The album was released in 2008 under Onion Boy Records.

== Track listing ==
- All songs composed by Bryan Beller, except where noted.

No.	Title	Length
1.	"Snooze Bar"	3:18
2.	"Casual Lie Day"	6:29
3.	"Greasy Wheel"	6:30
4.	"Cost of Doing Business"	1:49
5.	"Blind Sideways"	4:19
6.	"Life Story"	1:57
7.	"Cave Dweller"	7:52
8.	"Play Hard"	3:50
9.	"Love Terror Adrenaline/Break Through"	10:22
10.	"Thanks in Advance" (composed by Bryan Beller, Mike Keneally, Griff Peters, Joe Travers)	8:52
11.	"From Nothing"	4:40
Total length:		60:00

To Nothing

Video by Bryan Beller
- Released: November 25, 2008
- Recorded: 2008
- Genre: Jazz Rock
- Length: 210:00
- Label: Onion Boy Records
- Director: Dave Foster

Bryan Beller chronology
To Nothing (2008)	Wednesday Night Live (2011)

== To Nothing – Special Edition DVD ==
To Nothing is the special edition DVD companion to the Bryan Beller album Thanks in Advance. It contains four hours of material including full-band studio tracking, interviews, overdubs, mixing, and more. Bonus features include gag reels, live concert footage, and bonus audio including rough mixes and demos.

== Personnel ==
- Bryan Beller – Bass
- Griff Peters – Lead Guitar
- Rick Musallam – Rhythm Guitar
- Joe Travers – Drums

=== Extended Personnel ===
- Bryan Beller – Bass, Keyboards, Percussion; Guitar solo (on Track No. 8)
- Chris Cottros – Lead guitar (Track No. 1 and 2)
- Bruce Dees – Rhythm guitar (Track No. 1)
- Jody Nardone – Piano (Track No. 1 and 2)
- Clayton Ivey – Hammond Organ (Track No. 1)
- Marcus Finnie – Drums (Track No. 1 and 2)
- Ann Marie Calhoun – Violins (Track No. 2)
- Jim Hoke – Clarinets (Track No. 2)
- Steve Herrman – Trumpets (Track No. 2)
- Doug Moffet – Tenor and Baritone Saxophones (Track No. 2)
- Roy Agee – Trombone and Bass Trombone (Track No. 2)
- Rick Musallam – Guitars (Track No. 3, 5, 8, 9, 10 and 11)
- Jeff Babko – Hammond Organ (Track No. 3, 10, and 11) Rhodes piano (Track No. 5)
- Joe Travers – Drums (Track No. 3, 10, 11)
- Mark Niemiec – Drums, Percussion (Track No. 4)
- Toss Panos – Drums (Track No. 5 and 7)
- Griff Peters – Guitars (Track No. 7, 10 and 11)
- Jude Crossen – Vocals (Track No. 8)
- Mike Olekshy – Guitar (Track No. 8)
- Nick D'Virgilio – Drums (Track No. 8)
- Mike Keneally – Lead Guitars and Piano (Track No. 9)
- Marco Minnemann – Drums (Track No. 9)
- Kira Small – Rhodes piano (Track No. 10)
- Scheila Gonzalez – Saxophone (Track No. 11)
