= Tres Caballeros =

Studio album by The Aristocrats
- Released: June 23, 2015
- Recorded: February 2015
- Studio: Sunset Sound Recorders, Hollywood, California
- Genre: Jazz fusion
- Label: Boing!
- Producer: The Aristocrats

The Aristocrats chronology
Secret Show: Live in Osaka (2015)	Tres Caballeros (2015)	You Know What...? (2019)

Tres Caballeros (Spanish for "Three gentlemen") is the third studio album by The Aristocrats, released on June 23, 2015. The album was recorded in February 2015 during a period of ten days at the Sunset Sound Recorders studio in California. Alongside a standard CD edition, a deluxe edition is available, with a bonus DVD including studio and live footage, demos and alternate takes.

== Critical reception ==
Rich Wilson of Prog magazine called the trio "preposterously talented" in a review of the album, writing that "countless musical twists retain your attention throughout". Wilson wrote that "Jack's Back" could "neatly fit onto a Spaghetti Western soundtrack", while "ZZ Top" and "The Kentucky Meat Shower" have a "Southern rock charm". Dom Lawson of Prog wrote that the album sees the band "audibly revel in shared chemistry and each other's brilliance [...] from swivel-eyed bluegrass metal to squawking, off-kilter jazz fusion, often within the same song".

The Prog Report wrote that the album features "memorable performances throughout", noting the diversity of styles each track presents, adding that it "sounds like the album the band has been trying to make all along". No Treble wrote that the album shows that the band has "learned a great deal in the band's four years together". Eva Plaza of Rock Progresivo wrote that part of the band's appeal is that "none of them overshadows the others", finding some of the songs to be influenced by the works of Quentin Tarantino.

== Track listing ==
Tres Caballeros track listing
No.	Title	Music	Length
1.	"Stupid 7"	Marco Minnemann	3:52
2.	"Jack's Back"	Guthrie Govan	6:06
3.	"Texas Crazypants"	Bryan Beller	5:19
4.	"ZZ Top"	Marco Minnemann	5:14
5.	"Pig's Day Off"	Guthrie Govan	6:04
6.	"Smuggler's Corridor"	Bryan Beller	8:11
7.	"Pressure Relief"	Marco Minnemann	6:56
8.	"The Kentucky Meat Shower"	Guthrie Govan	4:49
9.	"Through the Flower"	Bryan Beller	11:26
Total length:			58:00

== Personnel ==
- Guthrie Govan – guitar
- Bryan Beller – bass
- Marco Minnemann – drums
