= Mystery Tracks – Archives Vol. 3 =

Compilation album by Steve Vai
- Released: 2003
- Recorded: 1991–2002
- Genres: Heavy Metal; Instrumental Rock; Hard Rock
- Length: 56:16
- Label: Favored Nations
- Producers: Steve Vai, Davitt Sigerson, Robin DiMaggio

Steve Vai chronology
The Elusive Light and Sound Vol. 1 (2002)	Mystery Tracks – Archives Vol. 3 (2003)	Various Artists - Archives Vol. 4 (2003)

Mystery Tracks – Archives Vol. 3 is the third in a series of discs by guitarist Steve Vai collecting unreleased tracks, demo recordings and other bits. The track Speeding is a playable song in Guitar Hero: Warriors of Rock, although it is a re-recording.
This Is Volume 4 in "The Secret Jewel Box".

== Track listing ==
All music is composed by Steve Vai except "Just Cartilage" written by Steve Vai/Devin Townsend and "Sofa" written by Frank Zappa.

No.	Title	Length
1.	"Speeding"	3:45
2.	"Just Cartilage"	4:19
3.	"San-San-Nana-Byoushi"	3:32
4.	"Sofa"	3:52
5.	"Essence"	5:50
6.	"Wipe Out 2000"	3:49
7.	"Feathers"	5:10
8.	"Opposites Attract Part 1"	3:52
9.	"Misfits"	6:11
10.	"Selfless Love"	3:27
11.	"Maple Leafs"	2:25
12.	"The Murder"	3:21
13.	"Opposites Attract Part 2"	9:23

== Personnel ==
- Steve Vai – guitar, tambourine, sampler
- Devin Townsend – vocals
- T.M. Stevens – bass
- Mike Keneally – guitar, keyboards
- Marc Ziegenhagen – keyboards
- Robin DiMaggio – drums, drum programming
- Deen Castronovo – drums
- Morgan Ågren – drums
- Jonathan Haas – percussion
