= Automatic (Dweezil Zappa album) =

Studio album by Dweezil Zappa
- Released: November 21, 2000
- Genre: Hard rock
- Label: Favored Nations
- Producer: Dweezil Zappa

Dweezil Zappa chronology
Music For Pets (1996)	Automatic (2000)	Go With What You Know (2006)

Professional ratings
Review scores
Source	Rating
AllMusic	2.5/5 stars

Automatic is an album by Dweezil Zappa, released in 2000. "Purple Guitar" was the audition piece for Bryan Beller to work with Zappa on this album. The song "Secret Hedges" was featured on Adult Swim.

== Track listing ==
All songs written by Dweezil Zappa except where noted.

1. "Fwakstension" performed by Zappa / Terry Bozzio / Scott Thunes – 4:13
2. "Automatic" performed by Zappa / Blues Saraceno / Joe Travers / Christopher Maloney – 3:59
3. "Hawaii Five-O" (Morton Stevens) performed by Zappa / Joe Travers – 1:52
4. "You're a Mean One Mister Grinch" (Dr. Seuss & Albert Hague) performed by Zappa / Ahmet Zappa / Joe Travers – 3:12
5. "Therapy" performed by Zappa / Terry Bozzio / Scott Thunes – 2:59
6. "12 String Thing" performed by Zappa / Joe Travers / Mark Meadows – 2:46
7. "Secret Hedges" (Zappa) – 2:12
8. "Habanera" (from the opera Carmen by Georges Bizet) performed by Zappa / Dick Cinnamon – 1:54
9. "Les Toreadors" (from the opera Carmen by Georges Bizet) performed by Zappa / Dick Cinnamon – 2:35
10. "Shnook" performed by Zappa / Scott Thunes / Mike Keneally – 2:55
11. "Dick Cinnamon's Office" performed by Zappa / Lisa Loeb / Joe Travers / Christopher Maloney - :55
12. "Purple Guitar" performed by Zappa / Joe Travers / Mike Keneally – 9:18

== Personnel ==
- Dweezil Zappa - lead electric and acoustic guitars, lead and harmony vocals, flange bass, bass, electric piano, arrangements, guitar arrangements, production, engineering, feedback, harmony
- Blues Saraceno - guitars
- Lisa Loeb - voices
- Morgan Ågren - drums, percussion
- Bryan Beller - bass, performer
- Terry Bozzio - drums
- Christopher Maloney - bass
- Bob Clearmountain - mixing
- Mike Keneally - rhythm guitar, backing vocals
- Scott Thunes - bass
- Joe Travers - drums, percussion
- Ahmet Zappa - vocals
- Steve Hall - mastering
- Jason Freese - performer
