= Satchurated: Live in Montreal =

Live album by Joe Satriani
- Released: 24 April 2012; 23 April 2012 (UK)
- Recorded: 12 December 2010
- Venue: Metropolis Theatre (Montréal)
- Genre: Instrumental rock
- Length: 140 minutes (DVD/Blu-ray/CD); 89 minutes (Theatrical version)
- Label: Epic
- Producers: Pierre & François Lamoureux

Joe Satriani chronology
Black Swans and Wormhole Wizards (2010)	Satchurated: Live in Montreal (2012)	Unstoppable Momentum (2013)

Professional ratings
Review scores
Source	Rating
AllMusic	3.5/5 stars
Classic Rock	8/10 stars
Record Collector	4/5 stars

Satchurated: Live in Montreal is a live album and concert film by American guitarist Joe Satriani. The film was released in both 2D and 3D formats to theatres worldwide during March 2012, before the DVD/Blu-ray, as well as an audio version on CD, was released in April 2012. It is the first 3D concert film to be mixed in Dolby 7.1 surround sound. It was recorded at the Metropolis Theatre in Montreal, Quebec, Canada on December 12, 2010 during Satriani's Wormhole Tour and the film was directed by award-winning film-makers Pierre and François Lamoureux.

== Track listing ==
All songs written by Joe Satriani.

=== Disc 1 ===
1. "Ice 9" – 5:14
2. "Hordes of Locusts" – 4:54
3. "Flying in a Blue Dream" – 6:32
4. "Light Years Away" – 6:26
5. "Memories" – 8:56
6. "War" – 6:32
7. "Premonition" – 4:26
8. "Satch Boogie" – 4:57
9. "Revelation" – 7:47
10. "Pyrrhic Victoria" – 5:15
11. "Crystal Planet" – 5:42
12. "The Mystical Potato Head Groove Thing" – 6:51
13. "Dream Song" – 4:57

=== Disc 2 ===
1. "God Is Crying" – 8:06
2. "Andalusia" – 6:22
3. "Solitude" – 0:59
4. "Littleworth Lane" – 3:47
5. "Why" – 7:08
6. "Wind in the Trees" – 9:03
7. "Always with Me, Always with You" – 3:50
8. "Big Bad Moon" – 9:07
9. "Crowd Chant" – 3:44
10. "Summer Song" – 8:26
11. "Two Sides to Every Story" – 4:14
12. "The Golden Room" – 7:19
- Disc 2 also contains the bonus video "Inside the Wormhole".

== Personnel ==
Musicians

- Joe Satriani – lead guitar, lead vocals
- Jeff Campitelli – drums
- Allen Whitman – bass
- Mike Keneally – keyboards, percussion
- Galen Henson – rhythm guitar

Production

- Pierre Lamoureux – concert film director, producer
- François Lamoureux – concert film director, audio recording, producer
- Mike Fraser – mixing
- Denis Normandeau – audio recording
- Mike Boden – digital editing
- Martin Julien – concert film editor
- Yves Dion – concert film editor
- Adam Ayan – mastering
- Éric Beauséjour – art direction
- Jay Blakesberg – cover photo

== Charts ==
Chart performance for Satchurated: Live in Montreal
Chart (2012)	Peak position
Australian Music DVD (ARIA)	15
Dutch Music DVD (MegaCharts)	6
French Albums (SNEP)	198
French Music DVD (SNEP)	4
Italian Music DVD (FIMI)	7
Swedish Music DVD (Sverigetopplistan)	7
Swiss Music DVD (Schweizer Hitparade)	6
US Music Videos (Billboard)	3
