= Culture Clash (album) =

Studio album by The Aristocrats
- Released: July 16, 2013
- Recorded: January 15–21, 2013
- Studio: Sound Emporium (Nashville, Tennessee)
- Genre: Progressive rock, progressive metal, jazz fusion
- Length: 57:09
- Label: Boing!
- Producer: The Aristocrats

The Aristocrats chronology
Boing, We'll Do It Live! (2012)	Culture Clash (2013)	Culture Clash Live! (2015)

Culture Clash is the second studio album by The Aristocrats, released on July 16, 2013. Alongside a standard CD edition, there was also a deluxe edition available, with a bonus DVD called Accept the Mystery: The Making of The Aristocrats' "Culture Clash", including studio footage and interviews. In its first week of release, the album reached number 8 on the Billboard Contemporary Jazz albums chart and number 16 on the Jazz Albums chart. On September 24, 2013, a double vinyl edition was released, pressing limited to 1,000 copies.

== Track listing ==
No.	Title	Music	Length
1.	"Dance of the Aristocrats"	Marco Minnemann	5:50
2.	"Culture Clash"	Guthrie Govan	7:00
3.	"Louisville Stomp"	Bryan Beller	4:40
4.	"Ohhhh Noooo"	Minnemann	6:47
5.	"Gaping Head Wound"	Govan	6:34
6.	"Desert Tornado"	Minnemann	5:35
7.	"Cocktail Umbrellas"	Beller	7:21
8.	"Living the Dream"	Beller	7:10
9.	"And Finally"	Govan	6:12
Total length:			57:09

== Personnel ==
- Guthrie Govan - guitar
- Bryan Beller - bass
- Marco Minnemann - drums
