= Zeke Piestrup =

Zeke Piestrup is a filmmaker and television host. He has hosted shows for Fuel TV (The Daily Habit), The Ski Channel, MetroTV, VH1 and is a former DJ for KROQ-FM.

== Downhill: The Bill Johnson Story ==
Piestrup produced/directed/edited the feature film documentary Downhill: The Bill Johnson Story. The film premiered at the 2011 Santa Barbara International Film Festival and went on to win "Best Adventure Film" at the Vail Film Festival and the "Big Bear Connection Award" at the Big Bear Lake International Film Festival.

== Apocalypse Later: Harold Camping vs The End of The World ==
For the two weeks leading up to May 21, 2011, Piestrup was the only journalist who spoke daily with the doomsday radio evangelist, Harold Camping. Featured scholars are John J. Collins of Yale Divinity School, Bart D. Ehrman of the University of North Carolina Chapel Hill, Loren Stuckenbruck of Princeton Theological Seminary, and Peter Lillback, President of Westminster Theological Seminary. The documentary feature film premiered at Dances With Films on June 8, 2013. At the Blue Whiskey Independent Film Festival, Piestrup won the award for "Promising New Filmmaker." The film is distributed by Gravitas Ventures in the U.S. & Canada.
