= Paul Cornford =

Paul Cornford is an English builder of boutique amplifiers, whose vacuum tube amplifiers have been highly praised. Notable users of Cornford's custom-made amps include Dave Kilminster (who uses Hellcat heads and 4x12 cabinets), Dweezil Zappa and Richie Kotzen. The company's Hurricane won an Editor's Pick Award from Guitar Player for its EL84-driven sound reminiscent of the Vox AC15.
