= Bryan Beller =

American bass guitarist (born 1971)

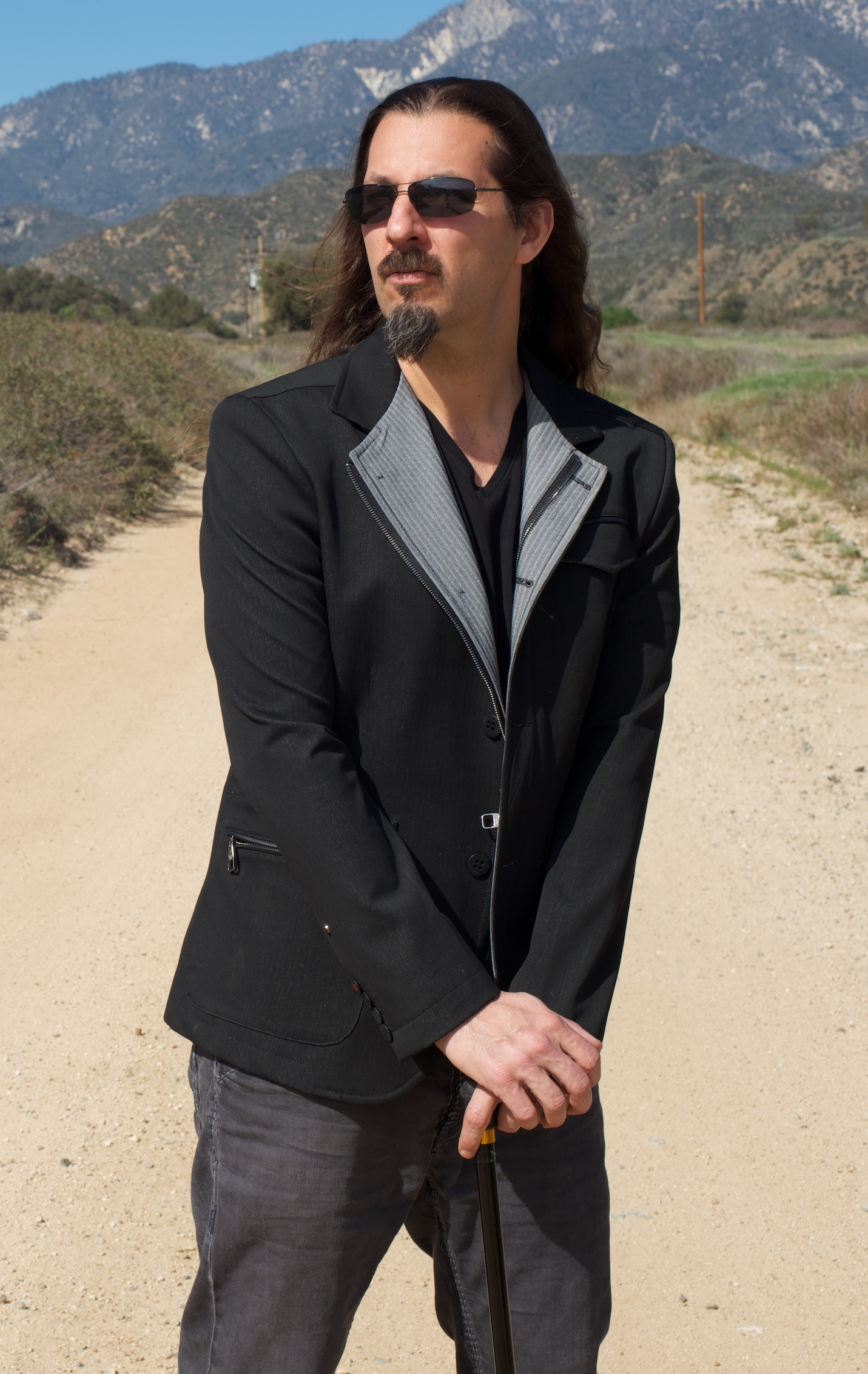
- Beller in 2015

Background information
- Born: May 6, 1971 (age 55)
- Genres: Instrumental rock; jazz rock; melodic death metal; progressive rock; progressive metal; heavy metal
- Instruments: Bass guitar; double bass; piano; vocals
- Years active: 1994–present
- Label: Onion Boy Records
- Member of: Galaktikon, The Aristocrats
- Formerly of: Dethklok, MullMuzzler
- Website: bryanbeller.com

Bryan Beller (born May 6, 1971) is an American bass guitarist known for his work with Joe Satriani, The Aristocrats, Dethklok, Mike Keneally, Steve Vai, James LaBrie of Dream Theater and Dweezil Zappa, as well as his four solo album releases, View (2003), Thanks In Advance (2008), Wednesday Night Live (2011), and the progressive double concept album Scenes From The Flood (2019). He has been Joe Satriani's touring bassist since 2013, encompassing the Unstoppable Momentum tour (2013–14), the Shockwave (2015–16) world tour, and the G3/What Happens Next tour (2018), in addition to featuring on the Shockwave Supernova record. Beller is also the bassist of the rock/fusion super-trio The Aristocrats (with Guthrie Govan on guitar and Marco Minnemann on drums), and he managed the band from 2012 to 2018. The Aristocrats have released six studio albums, along with four live releases documenting the band's world tours in support of their debut album The Aristocrats and sophomore album Culture Clash. Their studio album You Know What... was the focus of their world tour that began in the summer of 2019 and extended through to 2020.

== Career ==
Beller first joined Dweezil and Ahmet Zappa's band Z in 1993. Mike Keneally was already a member of the band. Eventually Beller joined Keneally's band Beer For Dolphins, and both musicians left Z in early 1996. With Beller on bass, Mike Keneally and Beer For Dolphins opened up for Steve Vai on his USA nationwide tour in support of Vai's album The Fire Garden in late 1996.

From 1997 to 2003, Beller worked at the bass amplification company SWR Sound Corporation, holding positions including Artist Relations Manager, Product Development Manager, and eventually Vice President. The company was sold to Fender Musical Instruments Corporation in 2003, at which point Beller became the Marketing Manager for SWR inside Fender. He left the company in 2005 to pursue a career as a musician on a full-time basis.

From 1999 to 2012, Beller wrote for Bass Player Magazine in various formats, including columns, CD reviews, feature articles, and full transcriptions. His cover stories included pieces on Chris Wolstenholme of Muse, Justin Chancellor of Tool, jazz bassist Christian McBride, and Alex Webster of Cannibal Corpse. He was on the magazine's masthead as a Contributing Editor from 2007 to 2012.

In his career as a sideman musician, during 1997-1999, Beller recorded two tracks on Steve Vai's The Ultra Zone album, toured Europe with former MC5 guitarist Wayne Kramer, and continued work with Mike Keneally on his albums Sluggo! and Dancing. During 1999-2005, Beller tracked three albums for Dream Theater's James LaBrie - two under the Mullmuzzler name (Keep It To Yourself and Mullmuzzler 2), and one as James LaBrie (Elements Of Persuasion). He also worked with Steve Vai and the Metropol Orchestra on two live performances of Vai's work, some pre-released and some debut orchestral material. Two years later, Beller was Steve Vai's choice for the 2007 "String Theories" tour, which resulted in the 2009 live CD/DVD Where The Wild Things Are.

From 2007 to 2012, Beller toured with the "band" Dethklok, a tongue-in-cheek extreme metal band born of the Cartoon Network "Adult Swim" show Metalocalypse; Beller tracked on the last two Dethklok releases (Dethalbum III; The Doomstar Requiem) and anchored the band for three nationwide tours, alongside Mastodon and Machine Head, among others. Meanwhile, his work with guitarist Mike Keneally (Frank Zappa) continued, on releases such as DOG (2004), Guitar Therapy Live (2006), Scambot: One (2009), and bakin' at the potato! (2011). Beller's first instructional DVD, Mastering Tone And Versatility, was released by Alfred Publishing in early 2012, and he's also a featured artist on the instructional website Jamplay.com.

In January 2011, Beller played a gig at The Anaheim Bass Bash with Marco Minnemann on drums and Guthrie Govan on guitar (who was filling in for Greg Howe, a late replacement due to a schedule conflict). This was the first show of the band that would become The Aristocrats less than a year later. The Aristocrats released their debut The Aristocrats in 2011, Culture Clash in 2013, Tres Caballeros in 2015, and You Know What...? in 2019, and Beller joined them for several world tours in support of those releases. Additionally, they released three live albums: Boing, We'll Do It Live (2012), Culture Clash Live (2015), and Secret Show: Live In Osaka (2015). The album You Know What...? debuted at #2 on the Billboard Jazz Charts in July 2019.

In 2013, Joe Satriani invited Beller to join his touring band for his Unstoppable Momentum World Tour from 2013 to 2014. In early 2015 Beller tracked on Satriani's album Shockwave Supernova, and again joined the band for that world tour from 2015 to 2016. Beller was featured in Satriani's documentary film of that tour, Beyond The Supernova (2018). Beller toured with Satriani once again throughout 2018 on the G3/What Happens Next World Tour, also featuring John Petrucci, Phil Collen of Def Leppard, and Uli Jon Roth.

In 2026, British band Haken released their new single "In a Fever Dream" featuring Beller on bass.

== Solo career ==
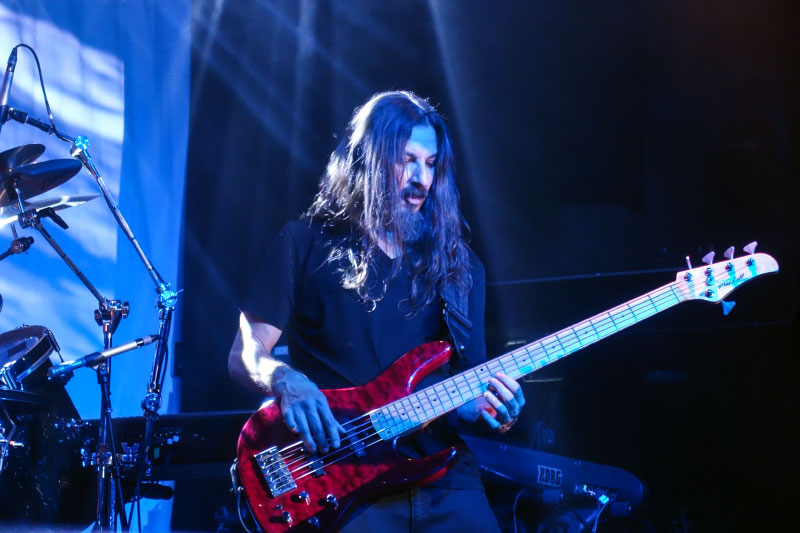
Bryan Beller (2016) in Aarhus, Denmark

Beller formed an independent record label (Onion Boy Records) in 2003 and has released four solo albums on that label. He released his debut solo album View in late 2003, featuring Mike Keneally, Jeff Babko, Toss Panos, Griff Peters, and Rick Musallam. The album was a mix of rock/fusion instrumentals, solo acoustic/electric bass compositions, and rock vocal songs. His second album Thanks In Advance was released in 2008. A compositional statement about breaking through anger and finding gratitude, it featured many of the same players as View, but leaned more in a jazz/rock fusion direction. The longest (ten minutes) and most complex composition, "Love Terror Adrenaline/Break Through", notably featured Marco Minnemann on drums, three years before the formation of The Aristocrats.

In 2011, Beller partnered with Mike Keneally to tour in support of his first two studio albums. Named the "They're Both The Same Band" tour due to the concept of sharing band members for both acts (Rick Musallam and Griff Peters on guitar, Joe Travers on drums, plus Keneally and Beller), they played five shows in the U.S. Northeast and nine shows on the U.S. West Coast. They did one final show in this format, in September 2011 at The Baked Potato jazz club in Los Angeles, and recorded it. That show resulted in Beller's first live album Wednesday Night Live, and was released in 2011 on both CD and DVD. The very same show resulted in Mike Keneally's live album bakin' at the potato!, released that same year.

From 2013 to 2016, Beller gathered material for his third studio solo album, the progressive double concept album Scenes From The Flood. Scenes was a departure for Beller, with 18 songs (15 instrumental, 3 with vocals) focusing on the double concept album format, with repeating melodies and themes throughout, and influenced by double albums such as Pink Floyd's The Wall, Nine Inch Nails' The Fragile, and Yes' Tales From Topographic Oceans. Beller spent most of 2017 creating the demos for the album, and then tracked it throughout 2018 with 26 different musicians, including guitarists Joe Satriani, John Petrucci, Guthrie Govan, Mike Keneally, Janet Feder, Mike Dawes, and Nili Brosh; drummers Gene Hoglan, Ray Hearne of Haken, and Joe Travers; and many others. The album was mixed and mastered by Forrester Savell (Karnivool), and mixing took place over nine months from 2018 to 2019. Scenes From The Flood was released in 2CD and double vinyl formats on September 13, 2019.

== Early years ==
Beller's earliest days on bass were as a Westfield, New Jersey, pre-teen on upright in the school orchestra. It was short-lived, as he switched to electric at 13 to better play Rush, Led Zeppelin, Pink Floyd and Metallica tunes. Concurrently, a couple of years of classical piano lessons morphed into his own self-taught ear training regimen, as he learned to play those same classic rock and metal songs on the piano completely by ear. Once he landed at Berklee College Of Music, Beller focused solely on bass, and eventually joined a blues-rock band called 100 Proof, which played originals mixed with blues and Allman Brothers covers in Boston's dirtiest bars.

But it was when Beller met drummer (and Frank Zappa enthusiast) Joe Travers at Berklee that his career first ventured onto its current path. Travers knew Mike Keneally, who was in Dweezil and Ahmet Zappa's band Z. Travers moved to Los Angeles in 1992, joined that band, and referred Beller, who moved to Los Angeles and joined Z (his first professional gig) in 1993.

== Discography ==
=== With Dweezil Zappa ===
- 1994: Z – Shampoohorn
- 1995: Z – Music For Pets (French Version)
- 1996: Z – Music For Pets (U.S. Version)
- 2000: Dweezil Zappa – Automatic

=== With Mike Keneally ===
- 1995: Boil That Dust Speck
- 2002: Wooden Smoke
- 2002: Wooden Smoke Asleep
- 2003: Pup
- 2004: Dog (CD/DVD)
- 2006: Guitar Therapy Live (CD/DVD)
- 2007: Boil That Dust Speck (Reissue – CD/DVD)
- 2008: Wine and Pickles
- 2009: Scambot 1
- 2011: bakin' @ the potato!
- 2012: Wing Beat Fantastic
- 2013: Wing Beat Elastic
- 2013: You Must Be This Tall
- 2016: Scambot 2

=== With Beer For Dolphins ===
- 1996: Soap Scum Remover (VHS)
- 1997: Half Alive In Hollywood
- 1998: Sluggo!
- 2000: Dancing
- 2000: Dancing With Myself ... and others (CD/DVD)

=== With Steve Vai ===
- 1999: The Ultra Zone
- 2000: The 7th Song: Enchanting Guitar Melodies
- 2002: The Elusive Light and Sound, Vol. 1
- 2003: The Infinite Steve Vai: An Anthology
- 2005: Real Illusions: Reflections
- 2007: Sound Theories, Vols. 1–2
- 2007: Visual Sound Theories (DVD)
- 2009: Where the Wild Things Are (CD/DVD)
- 2010: Where The Other Wild Things Are

=== With James LaBrie ===
- 1999: MullMuzzler – Keep It to Yourself
- 2001: Mullmuzzler 2
- 2005: Elements of Persuasion
- 2008: Prime Cuts

=== With Yogi ===
- 2001: Any Raw Flesh?
- 2003: Salve
- 2006: Half-Print Demigod

=== Solo albums ===
- 2003: View
- 2008: Thanks In Advance
- 2011: Wednesday Night Live
- 2019: Scenes from the Flood

=== Video and DVDs ===
- 2008: To Nothing
- 2011: Wednesday Night Live DVD
- 2012: Mastering Tone And Versatility (Instructional DVD, Alfred Music Publishing)

=== With Colin Keenan ===
- 2008: Nothing Clever
- 2009: So Far Gone
- 2011: Nothing Clever

=== With Razl ===
- 2008: Rotonova
- 2011: Microscopic

=== With Dethklok ===
- 2009: Dethalbum II
- 2012: Dethalbum III
- 2013: The Doomstar Requiem

=== With The Aristocrats ===
- 2011: The Aristocrats
- 2012: Boing, We'll Do It Live!
- 2013: Culture Clash
- 2015: Culture Clash Live!
- 2015: Secret Show: Live in Osaka
- 2015: Tres Caballeros
- 2019: You Know What...?
- 2021: Freeze! Live In Europe 2020
- 2022: The Aristocrats with Primuz Chamber Orchestra
- 2024: Duck

=== With Brendon Small ===
- 2012: Brendon Small's Galaktikon
- 2017: Brendon Small's Galaktikon II

=== With Nick Johnston ===
- 2014: Atomic Mind

=== With Joe Satriani ===
- 2015: Shockwave Supernova
- 2016: Supernova Remix
- 2022: The Elephants of Mars
