= JamPlay =

Online instructional guitar-playing subscription service

- Website type: Privately held company
- Available in: English
- Founded: 2006
- Headquarters: Beavercreek, Ohio, US
- Creators: Jeff Booth, Chris Dawson, Kevin Wimer
- Industry: Education, mobile applications
- Services: Guitar lessons
- Revenue: $4.1 million (2013)
- Website: www.jamplay.com
- Registration: Required
- Users: 404,363
- Current status: Active

JamPlay is an online instructional guitar-playing subscription service. The company was founded in Beavercreek, Ohio in 2006 by Kevin Wimer, Jeff Booth and Chris Dawson. From 2010 to 2013, the company's revenue rose from $2 million to $4.1 million, a 105 percent growth.

JamPlay streams videos of guitar lessons and live chats with music teachers. It has over 4,000 lessons from 70 professional instructors including musicians such as Ron "Bumblefoot" Thal, Steve Stevens, Robb Flynn, Phil Demmel, Glen Drover, Rex Brown, Andy James and Mike Mushok.
