= Earl Thomas (musician) =

American blues singer (born 1960)

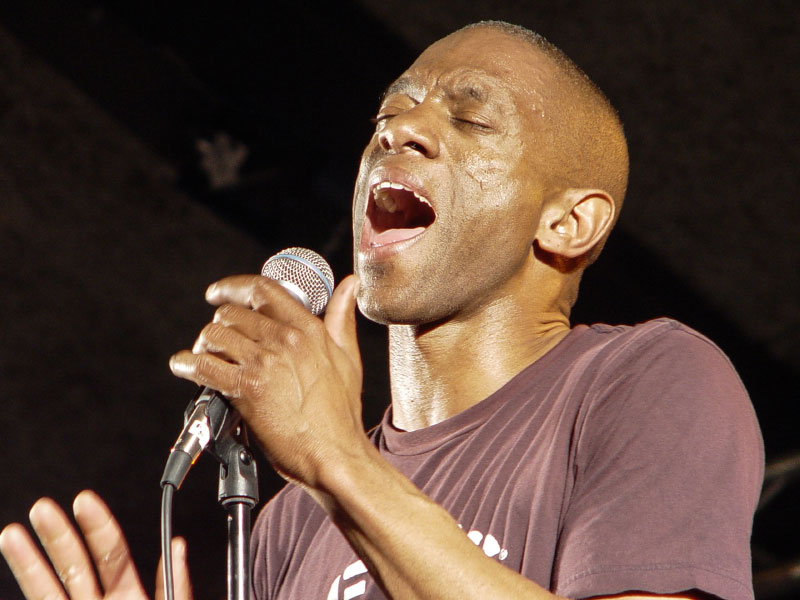
Thomas at the 2009 Djurs Bluesland Festival, Aarhus, Denmark

Earl Thomas Bridgeman (born August 29, 1960) is an American blues singer from California, United States. He is also a songwriter, with songs covered by artists including Tom Jones, Etta James, Solomon Burke and Screamin' Jay Hawkins. He has twice been nominated for a Grammy Award and has won the San Diego Music Award four times.

== Biography and career ==
Thomas was born in Pikeville, Tennessee, United States and attended Humboldt State University.

He started out playing the Arcata clubs in the early 1980s while still at university. He was at an open mic night at an Arcata club and sang the Jackson Browne number "Something Fine", which marked the start of his performance career.

In the early 1990s, he moved to San Diego, California. His Blue... Not Blues album was released in 1991 and received favorable reviews, referred to by one reviewer as "a pleasant surprise". His self-penned song, "I Sing the Blues", was a hit for Etta James.

In 2008 he played at the Russian River Blues Festival in Sonoma County, California.

In August 2016, Thomas appeared at the Great British Rhythm and Blues Festival at Colne, Lancashire, England.

== Discography ==
- 1990: I Sing the Blues (Conton)
- 1992: Blue...Not Blues (Bizarre-Straight/Rhino) reissue of I Sing the Blues
- 1994: Extra Soul (Bizarre-Planet/JDC)
- 1995: Stronger Than the Flame (Conton)
- 1998: The Elector Studio Sessions
- 2001: Justin Torpey Band featuring Earl Thomas: Rhapsody (Justin W. Torpey Productions)
- 2003: Soul'd! (Memphis International)
- 2005: Intersection (Memphis International)
- 2006: Plantation Gospel (JP Bomann Productions)
- 2006: Unplugged at Caffe Calabria (Bridgeman Enterprises)
- 2007: Earl Thomas & the Kings of Rhythm: Live at Biscuits & Blues (Earl Thomas Music)
- 2008: Soulshine (Earl Thomas Music)
- 2010: Introducing the Blues Ambassadors (Earl Thomas Music)
- 2011: Earl Thomas with Paddy Milner & the Big Sounds: See It My Way (Pepper Cake/ZYX Music)
- 2016: Crow (Earl Thomas Music)
- 2022: Cold Ghetto (Earl Thomas Music)
- 2023: Church Songs (Earl Thomas Music)
