= The Elusive Light and Sound Vol. 1 =

Compilation album by Steve Vai
- Released: June 4, 2002
- Genre: Instrumental rock Soundtrack
- Length: 68:48
- Label: Favored Nations
- Producer: Steve Vai

Steve Vai chronology
| FZ Original Recordings; Steve Vai Archives, Vol. 2 (2001) | The Elusive Light and Sound Vol. 1 (2002) | Mystery Tracks - Archives Vol. 3 (2003) |

Professional ratings
Review scores
| Source | Rating |
|---|---|
| Allmusic | link |

The Elusive Light and Sound Vol. 1 is a 2002 compilation album by Steve Vai. The album collects many of the songs that Vai recorded for movies and television shows.

The album is Volume 1 in "The Secret Jewel Box".

== Track listing ==
- 1. "Celluloid Heroes" (Ray Davies) - (The Kinks' Cover)

Recorded for "Interview with the Vampire" (1994) (does not appear in the film)

- 2. "Love Blood"

From or inspired by the movie "Crossroads" (1986), with Ralph Macchio and Joe Seneca

^{These tracks were not released as part of the OST}

- 3. "Fried Chicken" (does not appear in the film)
- 4. "Butler's Bag" (Vai, Ry Cooder) (different version from the film)
- 5. "Head-Cuttin' Duel" (Vai, Cooder)
- 6. "Eugene's Trick Bag" (Vai)

From or inspired by the movie "Dudes" (1987)

- 7. "Amazing Grace" (previously released on the soundtrack album)
- 8. "Louisiana Swamp Swank"

From or inspired the movie Bill & Ted's Bogus Journey (1991)

- 9. "Air Guitar Hell"
- 10. "The Reaper" (previously released on the soundtrack album)
- 11. "Introducing the Wylde Stallions"
- 12. "Girls Mature Faster Than Guys"
- 13. "The Battle"
- 14. "Meet the Reaper"
- 15. "Final Guitar Solo"
- 16. "The Reaper Rap" (previously released on the soundtrack album)

From the movie Encino Man (1992)

- 17. "Drive the Hell Out of Here"
- 18. "Get the Hell Out of Here" (previously released on the soundtrack album)

From the movie PCU (1994)

^{From the film score, not released on the original motion picture soundtrack album (except n.40)}

- 19 "Welcome Pre-Frosh"
- 20 "The Dark Hallway"
- 21 "The Dead Band Ends"
- 22 "The Cause Heads"
- 23 "Find the Meat"
- 24 "The Ax Will Fall"
- 25 "Now We Run (Cue)"
- 26 "Hey Jack"
- 27 "What!"
- 28 "Still Running"
- 29 "Dead Heads"
- 30 "Blow Me Where the Pampers Is"
- 31 "Pins and Needles"
- 32 "Plug My Ass In"
- 33 "Loose Keg Sightings"
- 34 "Don't Sweat it"
- 35 "How Hidge"
- 36 "Beer Beer"
- 37 "We're Not Gonna Protest"
- 38 "Initiation"
- 39 "See Ya Next Year"
- 40 "Now We Run" (previously released on the soundtrack album)

Except where noted, all other tracks are unreleased on any other album.
All songs written by Steve Vai, except where noted.
