= Guthrie Govan =

English musician (born 1971)

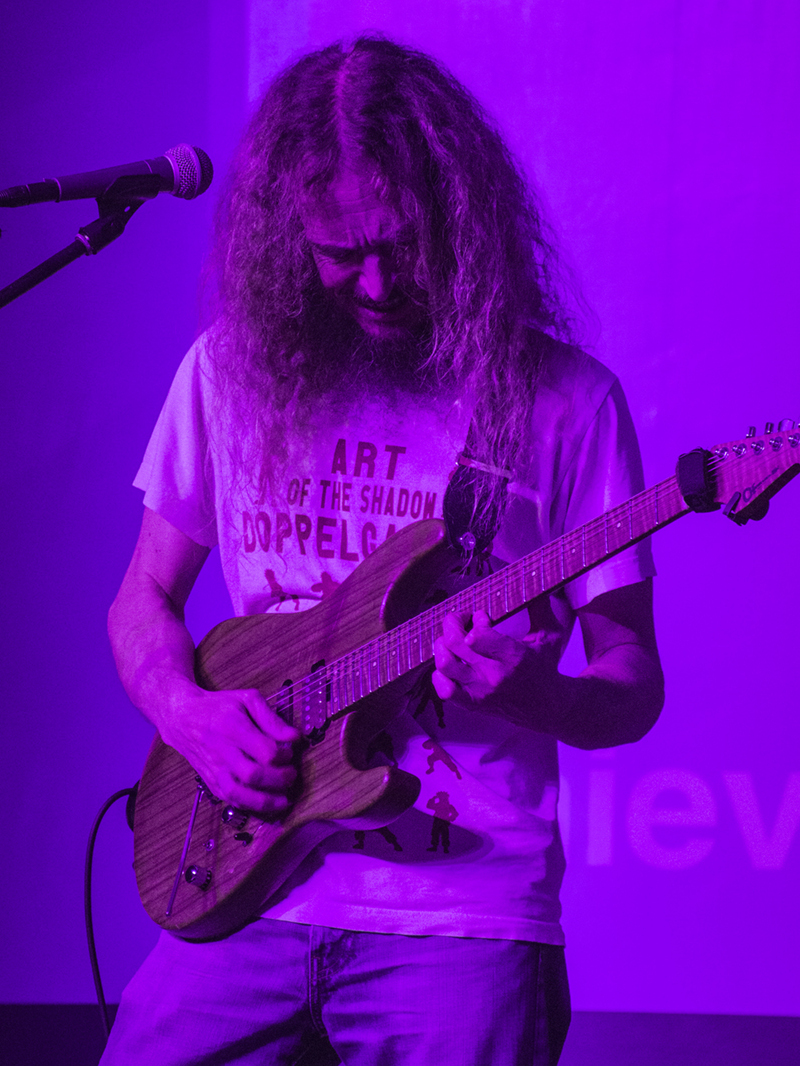
- Govan in 2018

Background information
- Born: Guthrie Govan; 27 December 1971 (age 54); Chelmsford, Essex, England
- Genres: Progressive metal; jazz rock; heavy metal; electronica; hard rock
- Instrument: Guitar
- Years active: 1991–present
- Label: Cornford
- Member of: The Aristocrats
- Formerly of: Asia; GPS; Steven Wilson
- Website: www.facebook.com/guthriegovanofficial

Guthrie Govan (/ˈɡʌvən/; born 27 December 1971) is an English guitarist and guitar teacher, known for his work with the bands the Aristocrats, Asia, GPS, the Young Punx and the Fellowship, as well as his solo project Erotic Cakes. More recently, he has collaborated with Steven Wilson and Hans Zimmer. He is a noted guitar teacher, working with the UK magazine Guitar Techniques, Guildford's Academy of Contemporary Music, Lick Library, and formerly the Brighton Institute of Modern Music. Govan was named "Guitarist of the Year" by Guitarist magazine in 1993.

== Biography ==
Govan began playing guitar aged three, encouraged by his father, but initially learning mainly by ear. His father taught him three chords first, and introduced him to his record collection. Govan began listening to 1950s rock 'n' roll artists such as Elvis Presley, Jerry Lee Lewis and Little Richard, and later the Beatles, Cream, Jimi Hendrix, Frank Zappa, and AC/DC, among others. He worked out chords and solos from listening to the records. Half-Scottish, Govan was also heavily influenced by Zal Cleminson, a Scottish guitarist best known for his work with the Sensational Alex Harvey Band. At the age of nine, Govan and his brother Seth played guitar on a Thames Television programme called Ace Reports. At secondary school he was exposed, via older classmates, to "shred" guitarists of the time. His first electric guitar was a Gibson SG, which he keeps at home.

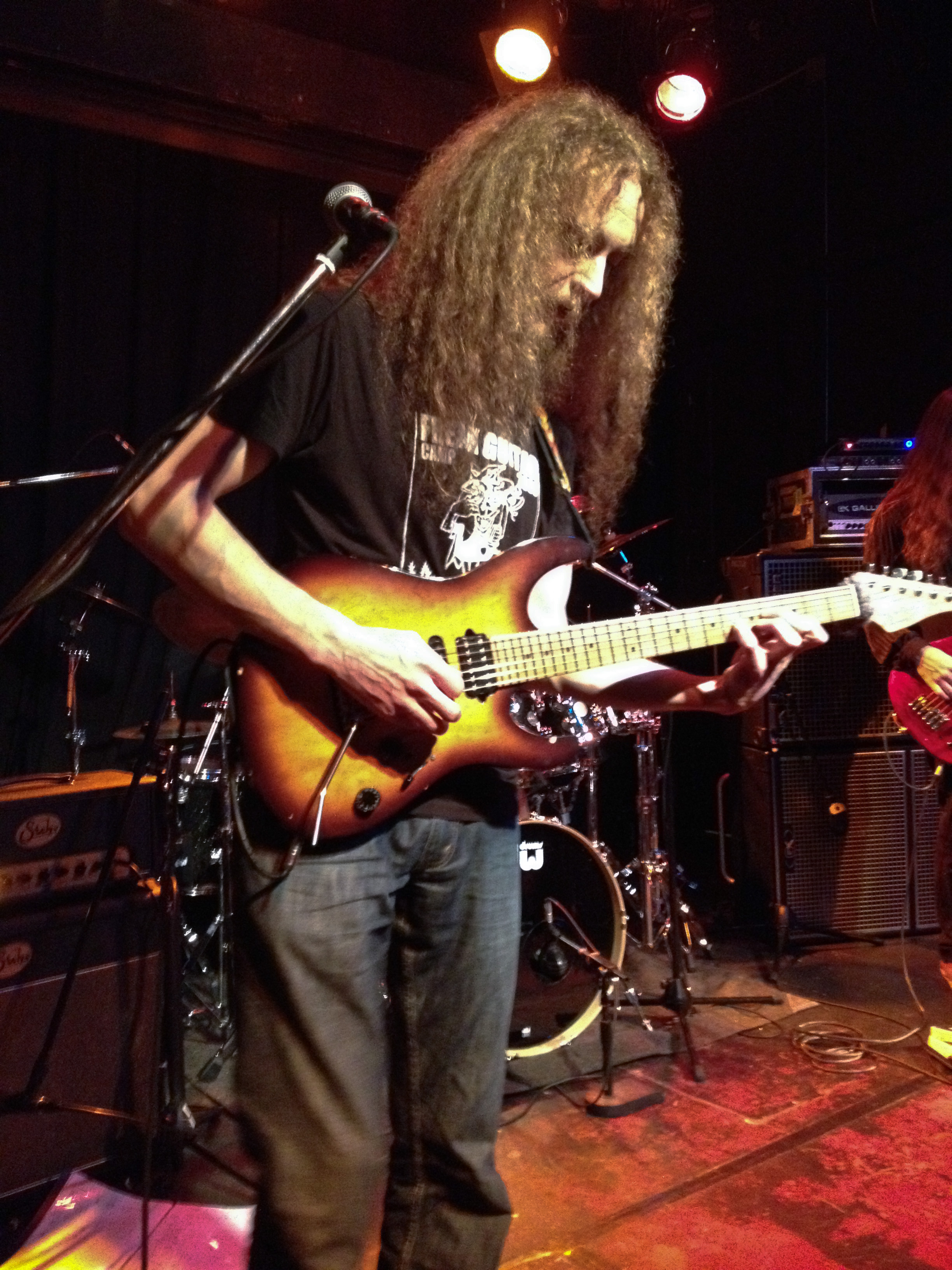
Govan in 2012 with the Aristocrats

After leaving school, Govan studied English at St Catherine's College at Oxford University. He dropped out after a year to pursue a career in music. Govan states that he was torn between continuing his studies or focusing on becoming a musician; he ultimately decided to concentrate on the latter. Around this time, (by Govan's own estimation, 1991) he sent demos of his work to Mike Varney of Shrapnel Records. Varney was impressed and offered him a record deal. Govan declined, despite initiating contact in the first place. He explained that: "it was as though all I really wanted to know was that I was good enough [...] I found I was getting a bit weary of the shred movement."

In 1993, he won Guitarist magazine's "Guitarist of the Year" competition with his instrumental piece "Wonderful Slippery Thing." A version of this song was included on his debut solo album. The demo of the track earned him a place amongst several other entrants in the live final, which he then won. In the meantime, Govan hit upon the idea of transcribing music from records professionally, and submitted the most technically difficult piece he could think of (a Shawn Lane transcription) to Guitar Techniques magazine. This earned him a job as a contributor to the magazine, ending a spell working in fast food.

=== Guitar teaching ===
Govan has since worked with Guitar Techniques, providing transcriptions of songs, including his own track Wonderful Slippery Thing. Since the late 1990s, Govan has taught at the Guitar Institute in Acton, Thames Valley University, and the Academy of Contemporary Music. He formerly taught at Brighton Institute of Modern Music, and is invited to teach in seminars, masterclasses and clinics all around the world. In this context, he is known for his ability to teach a wide range of styles. Govan has published two books on guitar playing: Creative Guitar Volume 1: Cutting Edge Techniques and Creative Guitar Volume 2: Advanced Techniques.

=== Asia, GPS and the Young Punx ===
Govan began his involvement with Asia playing on the album Aura, after the band was unable to secure the services of their first two choices for guest guitarists: Brian May or Steve Lukather. Govan explained that he was then chosen as an "affordable" option for the band, which had not experienced recent chart success. With his work on the album complete, Govan was added to the Asia line-up for the tour to support the new album. He wrote an instrumental song, Bad Asteroid, which itself was based on material from Govan's early 1990s demo. He went on to play on the band's 2004 album Silent Nation.

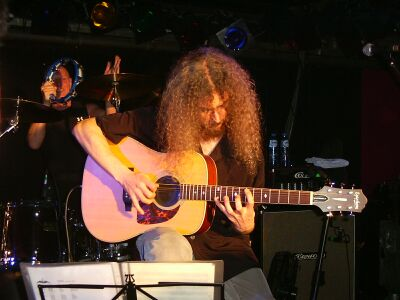
Govan live in Haarlem, the Netherlands, with Asia in 2005.

In 2006, Asia keyboardist Geoff Downes decided to reform the band with its original 3 members. Govan and two other band members, bassist/singer John Payne and Jay Schellen, along with keyboardist Erik Norlander continued under the name Asia Featuring John Payne. Govan left in mid-2009. He was replaced by virtuoso guitarist Mitch Perry, known for his work with Cher, Ratt, Lita Ford, and the Michael Schenker Group. Since Govan's departure from Asia featuring John Payne, they have gone on to considerable international success.

Govan, Payne and Schellen also formed GPS (named after the members' initials), and after the addition of Ryo Okumoto on keyboards the band released the album Window to the Soul (2006). Most of the material on that album was written for a proposed Asia album, but was scrapped by Geoff Downes when he reunited the original line-up of Asia.

Govan performs on a number of tracks on Your Music Is Killing Me, the debut album of UK electronic dance music act the Young Punx and is part of their live act. He also appears in the music video for their track Rockall.

Govan has played live guitar for Dizzee Rascal, including a performance on Later With Jools Holland.

=== Erotic Cakes and the Fellowship ===
Govan's debut solo album, Erotic Cakes, was released through Cornford Records in August 2006. In the album's sleeve notes, Govan states the album is a Simpsons reference (From the Episode "Treehouse of Horror VI"); he also explains that when playing live, the band is billed as Erotic Cakes rather than simply Guthrie Govan. In addition to bass by Govan's brother Seth and drumming by Pete Riley, the album features guitar solos by Richie Kotzen (whose Los Angeles studio was used to record the guitar tracks on the album) on Ner Ner and Bumblefoot on Rhode Island Shred respectively. Seth Govan and Pete Riley also complete the Erotic Cakes live band. Previous versions of Waves and Rhode Island Shred appeared on the compilation Guitar on the Edge, Vol 1. no.4 (Legato Records, 1993). A version of his Guitarist of the Year winning piece, Wonderful Slippery Thing appears on the album. While this is his first album, Govan had been collaborating with drummer Pete Riley on the music since the mid-1990s. Govan faced a set-back after the albums were produced when several thousand copies of Erotic Cakes were stolen during a warehouse robbery and were never recovered, but the record company said that "if the thieves can sell all of the records they have a job here with us".

The Erotic Cakes band line up, with the addition of saxophonist Zak Barrett, also forms jazz-fusion band the Fellowship. The band used to play at the Bassment club in Chelmsford, Essex, every Thursday night and did so for several years. They continue to play at the Bassment club to this day, normally just two or three times a year.

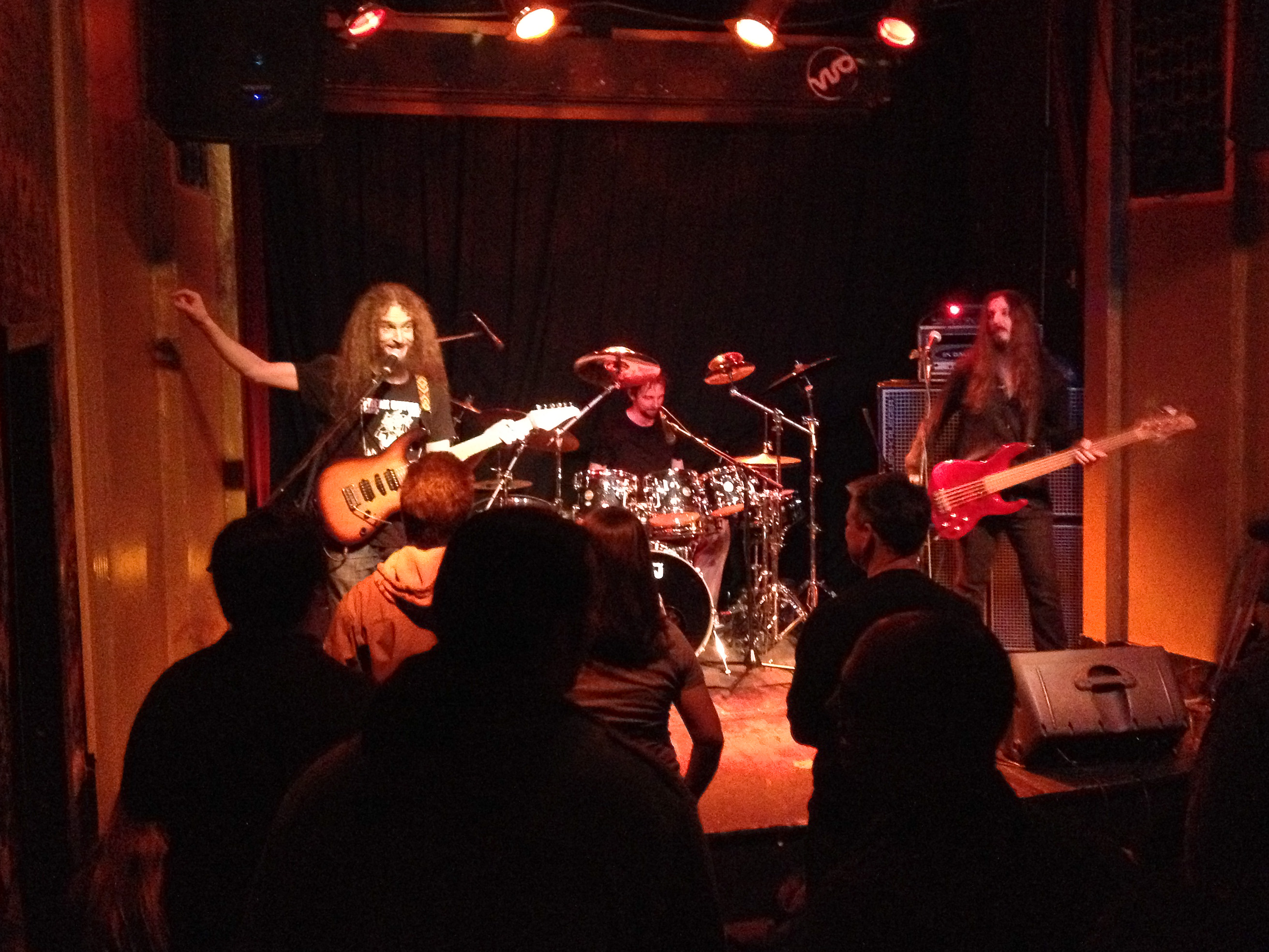
Govan with the Aristocrats

=== The Aristocrats ===
In late 2011, Govan announced a new tour with a new band the Aristocrats, featuring Bryan Beller on bass and Marco Minnemann on drums. Their self-titled debut album was released worldwide in September 2011, followed by Culture Clash in 2013. In January 2015 The Aristocrats released their second live CD/DVD Culture Clash Live! through all official channels and a very special so-called official self-released bootleg double CD Secret Show - Live in Osaka, which was available only in their own webstore and during the live concerts at the merchandise table. The band's third official studio album, Tres Caballeros, was released on 23 June 2015. In March 2019 The Aristocrats recorded their fourth studio album (You Know What...?) in the Brotheryn Studios (Ojai, CA), which was released 28 June 2019. Most recently, the band returned to North America in 2024, after touring Asia and Europe in 2023.

=== Steven Wilson ===
Govan was the lead guitarist in Steven Wilson's band, performing on The Raven That Refused to Sing, Hand. Cannot. Erase., and 4½, and was a full-time touring musician for Wilson's band until April 2015. Govan left the band because of touring priorities with the Aristocrats whose touring schedule was clashing with Wilson's. Govan recommended Dave Kilminster as his replacement.

=== Hans Zimmer ===
Since 2016, Govan has been the lead guitarist in the 'Hans Zimmer Live' band and has toured the world with this ensemble. Zimmer found Govan on YouTube where he saw Govan play a fretless guitar. After some messages were exchanged on Govan's official Facebook page (Govan thought he was dealing with an imposter first, until Zimmer sent him his private phone number and asked Govan to call him), he became part of the live band. In addition, he has contributed to a number of Hans Zimmer soundtracks such as The Boss Baby (2017), X-Men: Dark Phoenix (2019), The Lion King (2019), and Dune (2021).

=== Other projects ===
In 2013, Govan held a guitar workshop with Paul Gilbert. He is also one of the guest stars on Michael Angelo Batio's album Intermezzo, released in November 2013. Govan was also a guest guitarist on one song, Electric in My Veins, in Nick Johnston's solo album, In a Locked Room on the Moon Govan was a guest guitar soloist in the song "Have a Blast" by Periphery.

In 2016, Govan played alongside Joe Satriani and Steve Vai in G3 2016 touring across Europe. The trek made its way through Italy and Germany and featured support from Mike Keneally on guitar, keyboards and vocals as well as Govan's band, the Aristocrats: bassist Bryan Beller and drummer Marco Minnemann.

=== Solo tours and guitar masterclasses ===
Since 2015 Guthrie Govan has embarked on more frequent solo tours, mostly in Asia where he has a lot of fans requesting him to perform live. He has toured extensively since then (when there were no tours scheduled with The Aristocrats or Hans Zimmer) across India, Bangladesh, Malaysia, Singapore, Hong Kong, China, Philippines, South Korea, and Japan. In India, his band has included drummer Gino Banks and bass guitar prodigy Mohini Dey, both high-profile players in India. For concerts in Japan he relies on drum prodigy Senri Kawaguchi, keyboard player Akira Ishiguro and bassist Mohini Dey. During tours in Russia he teamed up with bassist Anton Davidyants and Hungarian drummer Gergő Borlai.

Govan is also an in-demand clinician, often teaching guitar masterclasses around the globe.

== Influences and technique ==
Govan's earliest influences were Jimi Hendrix and Cream-era Eric Clapton; as such he describes himself as coming from a "blues rock background". While he is "wary" of 1980s technique driven guitar music ("shred") he cites as important the imagination of Steve Vai (as well as Frank Zappa, with whom Vai played) and the passion of Yngwie Malmsteen. Jazz and fusion guitarist he says are pivotal influences include Joe Pass, Allan Holdsworth, Jeff Beck and John Scofield. He also admires modern guitar players with different styles such as Derek Trucks and Alex Machacek.

Although a very able player in a diversity of styles, Govan has a distinct playing style typically characterised by long, smooth runs often using chromatic notes to "fill in gaps", his fast and fluid tapping up and down the neck, funky slapping, and occasional use of extreme effects. Govan has said that the guitar is simply a "typewriter" for getting a musical message across. Due to his experience in listening to music and working out riffs, Govan states that he is often able to imagine or visualize fully formed guitar parts before actually playing them.

== Equipment ==
An overview of all past and current gear Guthrie Govan uses.

In October 2012, Govan was seen using a Charvel guitar on tour. It was later confirmed to be a (koa) prototype. Govan stated in January 2013 that he and Suhr parted ways officially.

In July 2013, Charvel made it official that they had joined forces with Govan, who had been using their guitars for a few months.

Govan's model sported a caramelised basswood body, birdseye maple top, a caramelised maple neck, Sperzel locking tuners, custom pick-ups by Michael Frank-Braun and a custom in-house developed (floating) tremolo bridge similar in design to a Floyd Rose, but without fine-tuners.

In January 2014 at the NAMM Show, Charvel officially introduced the Charvel USA Guthrie Govan Signature Model in two versions: one with a Birdseye Maple top and the other with a Flame Maple top, both equipped with custom pickups. In 2017 Charvel added a newer lighter baked Ash body signature model to the GG-signature models and upgraded the former models with a single coil-humbucker switch.

In the past he has used Suhr Guitars: three different Guthrie Govan Signature Model guitars, three custom Standards, a Modern 24-fret model, a Classic and Classic T.

Before becoming a Suhr Guitars endorser he used a PRS guitar, as seen in many instructional videos from his early career.

Govan used a Strandberg 8-string while on tour with Hans Zimmer.

He also plays a Vigier fretless guitar (not endorsed).

Since 2013, Govan has started using amplifiers designed and produced by Victory Amplification for both Steven Wilson and the Aristocrats tours. He has been working closely with designer Martin Kidd (who was originally the brain behind the Cornford amps) getting the V30 and V30 Mk II made the way he likes a tube amp to sound. Since 2013, Govan has been taking his carry-on V30 across the globe. For the Hans Zimmer tours, Govan uses a Kemper Profiler, because with an orchestra on stage and using in-ears it is not advised to blast loud noises through a cabinet.

In the past, Govan also has used Cornford amps. The sleeve notes of Erotic Cakes state he has used an RK100, MK50 and Hellcat. On the European tour of 2010 and 2011 he played Brunetti amplifiers (CustomWork Mercury 50) like his friend Dave Kilminster. With "The Aristocrats" he was using Suhr Badger 30 amps live, as well as a CAA PT-100 and the Badger 30 on the debut album.

Guthrie Govan, as stated before, uses his Victory V30 MkII amplifier but to get the desired tone he prefers to use 4 x 12 cabinets with Celestion V30 Vintage speakers inside, slightly having a preference for cabinets made by Mesa (for the thick wood), Orange, Bogner. Mid 2022 Guthrie stopped using real amps for live shows.

Govan has been an analog fan concerning pedals, but for a few years (since 2016) he has been moving towards using a Fractal FX-8 live on tours. The small footprint makes it easier traveling for a musician and the current digital solution comes extremely close to the former analog experiences. Since mid 2022 Guthrie has changed his performance live gear to a Fractal FM9 (FX and amp simulator) and no longer uses any amplifier but only a powered monitor. This is an all digital switch. Further, in 2022, during The Aristocrats US Tour, Guthrie tested out an all-digital touring rig using the Fractal FM-9 and a few powered monitors / cabinets. Going fully digital gives Guthrie a chance to use multiple different modelled amplifiers across the entire set of the band and a few specific effects entirely impossible using analog equipment. In an interview Guthrie stated that he was quite embracing the digital world and experimenting with the possibilities that world offers.

As of October 2018 Govan used D'Addario NYXL 10-46 guitar strings. He was previously a Rotosound endorsed artist.

Guthrie went completely digital in 2023 during The Aristocrats tours in Asia and Europe and has tried out the Laney (full range) LFR-212's. After a successful tour he decided to sign up with Laney and use their powered cabinets on stage. (announced 17 July 2023)

== Discography ==
=== Solo albums ===
- Erotic Cakes (2006)

=== JTC backing tracks album ===
- West Coast Grooves (2013)

=== With Asia ===
- Aura (2001)
- America: Live in the USA (2003, 2CD & DVD)
- Silent Nation (2004)

=== With the Aristocrats ===
Studio albums

- The Aristocrats (2011)
- Culture Clash (2013)
- Tres Caballeros (2015)
- You Know What...? (2019)
- The Aristocrats With Primuz Chamber Orchestra (2022)
- Duck (2024)

Live albums

- Boing, We'll Do It Live! (2012)
- Culture Clash Live! (2015)
- Secret Show: Live in Osaka (2015)
- FREEZE! Live In Europe 2020 (2021)

=== With Steven Wilson ===
- The Raven That Refused to Sing (2013)
- Hand. Cannot. Erase. (2015)
- 4½ (2016)

=== With GPS ===
- Window to the Soul (2006)
- Live in Japan (2006)

=== Collaborations and guest solos ===
- Periphery – Periphery II: This Time It's Personal (guitar solo on "Have a Blast") (2012)
- Various Artists – Jason Becker's Not Dead Yet! (Live in Haarlem) (2012)
- Marco Minnemann – Symbolic Fox (2012)
- Docker's Guild - The Mystic Technocracy – Season 1: The Age of Ignorance (2012)
- Richard Hallebeek – Richard Hallebeek Project II: Pain in the Jazz, (2013), Richie Rich Music
- Mattias Eklundh – Freak Guitar: The Smorgasbord, (2013), Favored Nations
- Nick Johnston – In a Locked Room on the Moon (2013)
- Nick Johnston – Atomic Mind - Guest Solo on track "Silver Tongued Devil"(2014)
- Lee Ritenour – 6 String Theory (2010), Fives, with Tal Wilkenfeld
- Jordan Rudess – Explorations (guitar solo on "Screaming Head") (2014)
- Dewa Budjana - Zentuary (2016) - (Guest Solo on track "Suniakala")
- Ayreon - The Source (2017)
- Nad Sylvan - The Bride Said No (second guitar solo on "What Have You Done") (2017)
- Jason Becker – Triumphant Hearts (guitar solo on "River of Longing") (2018)
- Jordan Rudess – Wired for Madness (guitar solo on "Off the Ground") (2019)
- Yiorgos Fakanas Group - The Nest .. Live in Athens (guitar) (2019)
- Bryan Beller - Scenes From The Flood (guitar on the song Sweet Water) (2019)
- Thaikkudam Bridge - Namah (guitar on the song "I Can See You") (2019)
- DarWin - A Frozen War (Solos on 'Nightmare of My Dreams' and 'Eternal Life') (2020)
- ANYWHEREDOOR - Observables (All guitars on 'Too Phart Gone') (2021)
- Octarine Sky - Close To Nearby (Guitars on four of the tracks) (2021)
- Bumblefoot - ...RETURNS! (Guest solo on "Anveshana") (2025)
- Karnivool - In Verses (Featuring on song "Reanimation") (2026)

=== Movie soundtracks ===
- The Boss Baby - Hans Zimmer OST - Guitar, Banjo, Koto (2017)
- X-Men: Dark Phoenix - Hans Zimmer OST - Guitars (2019)
- The Lion King 2019 - Hans Zimmer OST - Guitars (2019)
- Xperiments from Dark Phoenix - Hans Zimmer - Guitars (2019)
- Dune - Hans Zimmer - Guitars (2021)
- Dune: Part Two - Hans Zimmer - Guitars (2024)
