= Unstoppable Momentum =

Studio album by Joe Satriani
- Released: May 7, 2013
- Recorded: Late 2012 – early 2013
- Studio: Skywalker Sound, San Rafael, California, US; Studio 21, San Francisco, California, US
- Genre: Instrumental rock
- Length: 44:58
- Label: Epic; Sony Music
- Producer: Joe Satriani; Mike Fraser

Joe Satriani chronology
| Satchurated: Live in Montreal (2012) | Unstoppable Momentum (2013) | Shockwave Supernova (2015) |

Professional ratings
Review scores
| Source | Rating |
|---|---|
| AllMusic | 3.5/5 stars |
| Liverpool Sound and Vision | 9/10 stars |
| Premier Guitar | 4/5 stars |
| Ultimate Classic Rock | 8/10 stars |

Unstoppable Momentum is the fourteenth studio album by guitarist Joe Satriani, released on May 7, 2013, through Epic Records. The album reached No. 42 on the U.S. Billboard 200 and remained on that chart for three weeks, as well as reaching the top 100 in nine other countries.

== Release and tour ==
Recording for Unstoppable Momentum took place from late 2012 to early 2013 and the title was announced on February 21, 2013. The track listing and cover art were revealed on March 19. A full-length preview of "A Door into Summer" was made available at Premier Guitar on April 8, along with a review of the album. Touring began in Europe from May to July, followed by North America from August to October.

During recording, Satriani collaborated with Jane's Addiction bassist and noted session musician Chris Chaney. Regarding the recording process, Chaney noted, "[It] was great. I was very fortunate to get a call to do some recording with him. A great keyboardist and all-around multi-instrumentalist named Mike Keneally, who had played with Frank Zappa forever, and then the drummer, one of my favorites of all time, named Vinnie Colaiuta, who plays with Jeff Beck and countless other amazing musicians, we went up to Skywalker Ranch, up in the Bay area, for about two weeks and we just cut a song or two a day. Joe is a prolific musician and incredibly cool and it was a lot of fun. I really enjoy sometimes stepping out of L.A. to do a project like that."

== Track listing ==
All music is composed by Joe Satriani.

| No. | Title | Length |
|---|---|---|
| 1. | "Unstoppable Momentum" | 5:14 |
| 2. | "Can't Go Back" | 3:58 |
| 3. | "Lies and Truths" | 4:44 |
| 4. | "Three Sheets to the Wind" | 3:22 |
| 5. | "I'll Put a Stone on Your Cairn" | 1:42 |
| 6. | "A Door into Summer" | 4:16 |
| 7. | "Shine On American Dreamer" | 4:46 |
| 8. | "Jumpin' In" | 5:11 |
| 9. | "Jumpin' Out" | 3:51 |
| 10. | "The Weight of the World" | 5:07 |
| 11. | "A Celebration" | 2:47 |
| Total length: | | 44:58 |

== Personnel ==
- Joe Satriani – guitar, keyboard, harmonica, engineering, production
- Mike Keneally – keyboard
- Vinnie Colaiuta – drums
- Chris Chaney – bass
- Mike Fraser – engineering, mixing, production
- Judy Kirschner – engineering
- Mike Boden – digital editing
- Dann Michael Thompson aka. Thomas Daniel Michaelson – digital editing assistance
- Brad Salter – mixing assistance
- Ryan Smith – mastering

== Chart performance ==
=== Weekly charts ===
| Chart (2013) | Peak position |
|---|---|
| Austrian Albums (Ö3 Austria) | 60 |
| Belgian Albums (Ultratop Flanders) | 82 |
| Belgian Albums (Ultratop Wallonia) | 133 |
| Croatian International Albums (HDU) | 25 |
| Czech Albums (ČNS IFPI) | 36 |
| Dutch Albums (Album Top 100) | 59 |
| French Albums (SNEP) | 77 |
| German Albums (Offizielle Top 100) | 67 |
| Hungarian Albums (MAHASZ) | 17 |
| Italian Albums (FIMI) | 61 |
| Scottish Albums (OCC) | 43 |
| Spanish Albums (Promusicae) | 70 |
| Swedish Albums (Sverigetopplistan) | 54 |
| Swiss Albums (Schweizer Hitparade) | 32 |
| UK Albums (OCC) | 44 |
| UK Download Albums (OCC) | 90 |
| UK Physical Albums (OCC) | 41 |
| US Billboard 200 | 42 |
| US Independent Albums (Billboard) | 7 |
| US Top Album Sales (Billboard) | 42 |
| US Top Hard Rock Albums (Billboard) | 1 |
| US Top Tastemaker Albums (Billboard) | 12 |
