= The Aristocrats (album) =

Studio album by The Aristocrats
- Released: September 13, 2011
- Genre: instrumental rock, progressive metal
- Length: 60:21
- Label: Boing!
- Producer: The Aristocrats

The Aristocrats chronology
The Aristocrats (2011)	Boing, We'll Do It Live! (2012)

The Aristocrats is the debut album of rock trio The Aristocrats, released on September 13, 2011.

== Track listing ==
No.	Title	Music	Length
1.	"Boing!... I'm in the Back"	Marco Minnemann	4:59
2.	"Sweaty Knockers"	Bryan Beller	8:09
3.	"Bad Asteroid"	Guthrie Govan	5:53
4.	"Get It Like That"	Minnemann	7:46
5.	"Furtive Jack"	Govan	6:52
6.	"I Want a Parrot"	Govan	9:58
7.	"See You Next Tuesday"	Beller	4:32
8.	"Blues Fuckers"	Minnemann	5:00
9.	"Flatlands"	Beller	7:13
Total length:			60:21

== Personnel ==
- Guthrie Govan - guitar
- Bryan Beller - bass
- Marco Minnemann - drums
