= The Aristocrats (band) =

International rock supergroup

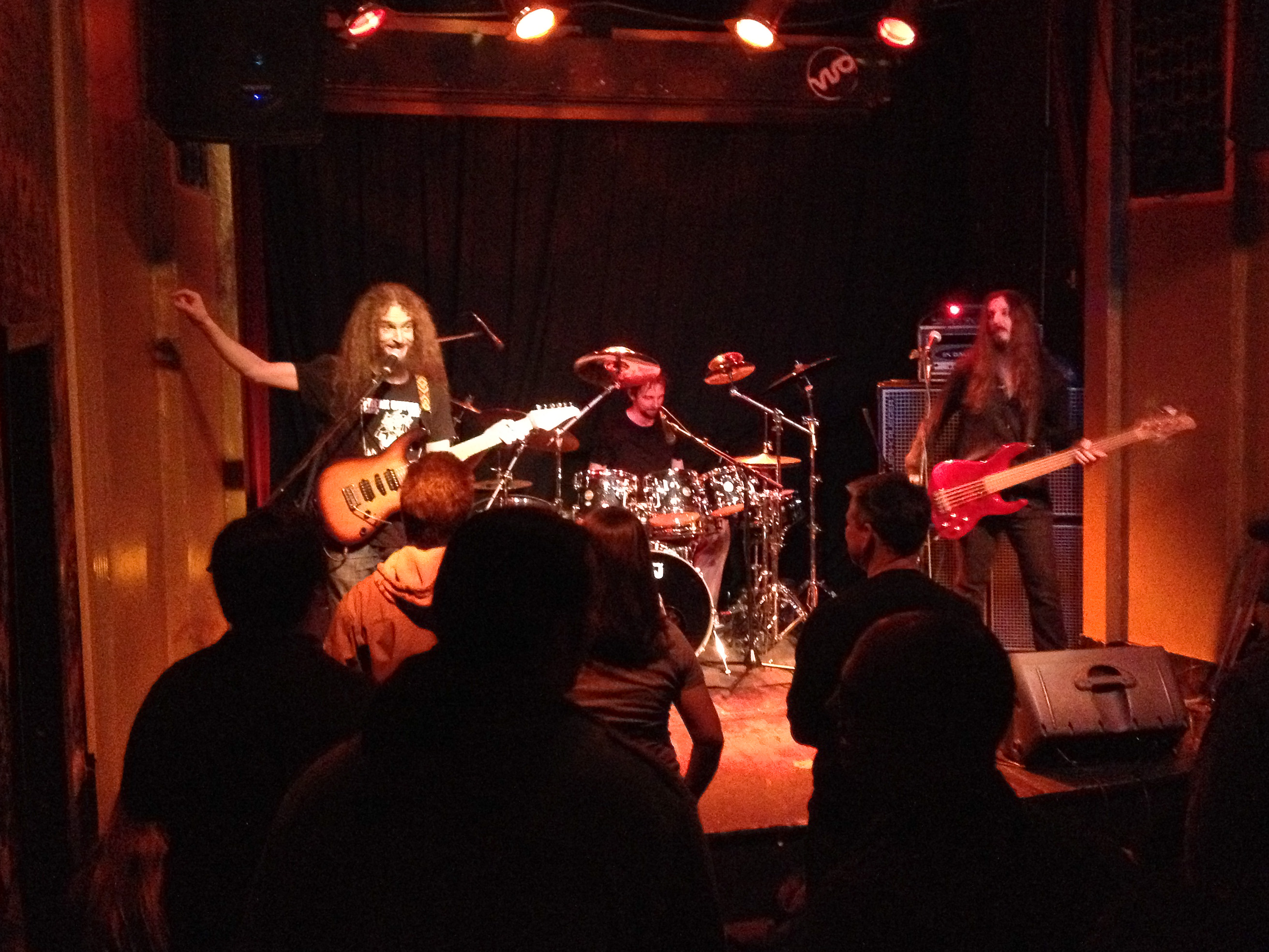
- The Aristocrats performing live in 2012

Background information
- Genres: Instrumental rock, jazz rock, jazz fusion
- Years active: 2011–present
- Label: Boing!
- Members: Guthrie Govan; Bryan Beller; Marco Minnemann
- Website: the-aristocrats-band.com

The Aristocrats are a rock group formed in 2011. The instrumental power trio consists of Guthrie Govan, Bryan Beller, and Marco Minnemann. The group name is inspired by the Aristocrats joke and consequently the song titles on their eponymous debut album are rife with salacious double-entendres.

== Formation and history ==
The band was formed after a wildly enthusiastic response to a concert performance at The Anaheim Bass Bash during the Winter NAMM show in January 2011. The trio had just one rehearsal before the concert but still performed well and amazed the audience as well as themselves. Originally the guitarist for that one-off show was to be Greg Howe, replaced by Guthrie Govan at the last moment. Guthrie later stated: "The chemistry was so great, that when we came offstage we all said to each other: 'This is working. We should record this.'" The band would later get together and meet in Chicago to record their debut album, which took just under two weeks. The music album reflected their respective influences, ranging from 70s fusion (Return to Forever), to progressive (King Crimson), to instrumental rock (Steve Vai, Joe Satriani), to rap metal (Rage Against the Machine) and to just plain absurdity (Frank Zappa). Bassist Bryan Beller stated, "We ended up using our different influences to write for each other. I wrote "Sweaty Knockers" specifically for Guthrie to have fun with, while Guthrie wrote “I Want A Parrot” with bass leads in mind. As for Marco's material, we're just lucky to be able to keep up with it!”.

After releasing their debut in September 2011, the trio toured for the year 2012. Later in the same year the band released its first live album, Boing, We'll Do It Live!. Footage and sound for this release were recorded in two concerts held at Alvas Showroom in Los Angeles, California. During those concerts the band played material from their debut album as well as songs from each band members' solo projects.

In July 2013, their second studio album, Culture Clash, was released, followed by a supporting tour—first in North America in 2013, and then in Europe, South America, and Asia in 2014. After the tour, the band compiled excerpts from performances at six different venues for their second live album, Culture Clash Live!, which was released on CD and DVD on January 20, 2015. On the same day, the band releases their "official bootleg" of the tour, a limited edition 2CD set titled Secret Show: Live in Osaka. During their January 2015 tour, the band debuted material for their third studio album Tres Caballeros. The album was recorded in February and released on June 23, 2015. In support of the album, the band toured in North America in summer 2015 and in Europe from November 2015 to February 2016.

In 2016 they took part in the G3 tour, along with Joe Satriani and Steve Vai.

From September to October 2016, the band toured India, Bangladesh, Nepal, Thailand, Hong Kong, Taiwan, Japan, and Australia, with the tour organized by their Asian agency, Jellybeard.

After this tour, The Aristocrats decided to take a long sabbatical, focusing on their solo projects and touring with other acts (BB/MM, Joe Satriani, GG, Hans Zimmer) throughout 2017 and 2018.

In December 2018, The Aristocrats announced they would return to the studio in early March 2019 to record their fourth studio album. The album, You Know What?, was recorded at Brotheryn Studios in Ojai, California, and released in June 2019.

In 2022, the album The Aristocrats with Primuz Chamber Orchestra featured nine tracks of existing material recorded with accompanying string arrangements and more.

On November the 14th, 2023 at a show in Bilbao, The Aristocrats announced their next studio album Duck, released February 2024. This album continued the tradition of nine tracks (three written by each member of the band) with silly titles including puns and asterisk-laden words, for example "Sitting with a Duck on the Bay" (referring to the song "Sitting on a Dock by the Bay") and "This Is Not Scrotum" rendered on streaming services as "This is not S*****m".

== Band members ==
- Guthrie Govan – guitar
- Bryan Beller – bass
- Marco Minnemann – drums

== Discography ==
Studio albums

- The Aristocrats (2011)
- Culture Clash (2013)
- Tres Caballeros (2015)
- You Know What...? (2019)
- The Aristocrats with Primuz Chamber Orchestra (2022)
- Duck (2024)

Live albums

- Boing, We'll Do It Live! (2012)
- Culture Clash Live! (2015)
- Secret Show: Live in Osaka (2015)
- Freeze! Live In Europe 2020 (2021)
