= The Aristocrats =

Offensive joke about a performance act

"The Aristocrats" is a taboo-defying, off-color joke that has been told by numerous stand-up comedians since the vaudeville era. It relates the story of a family trying to get an agent to book their stage act, which is remarkably vulgar and offensive. The punch line reveals that they incongruously bill themselves as "The Aristocrats". When told to audiences who know the punch line, the joke's humor depends on the described outrageousness of the family act. Because the objective of the joke is its transgressive content, it is most often told privately, such as by comedians to other comedians.

The joke came to wider public attention when Gilbert Gottfried told it during the Friars' Club roast of Hugh Hefner to recover after losing the crowd and eliciting "booing and hissing" with a joke about the 9/11 terrorist attacks, which had occurred just 18 days prior. The 2005 documentary film of the same name by Paul Provenza and Penn Jillette featured numerous comedians discussing and retelling the joke. Jillette has claimed the routine was Johnny Carson's favorite joke of all time.

== Format ==
This joke typically has these elements—alternative versions may change this form.

1. Setup: A family act (or a representative, usually a head of household) goes in to see a talent agent about booking their act. The agent asks what their act consists of.
2. Act: If the whole family is present, the act is performed for the agent; otherwise it is described, in as much detail as the teller prefers, typically ad lib. Traditionally, the description is tasteless and ribald, with the goal to significantly transgress social norms. Taboo elements such as racism, animal cruelty, incest, rape, child sexual abuse, coprophilia, coprophagia, bestiality, necrophilia, cannibalism, and murder are common themes.
3. Punch line: The shocked (or intrigued) agent asks what the act is called, and the proud answer (sometimes delivered with a flourish) is: "The Aristocrats!"

== See also ==
- Dead baby jokes
- Shaggy dog story
