= Marco Minnemann =

German drummer (born 1970)

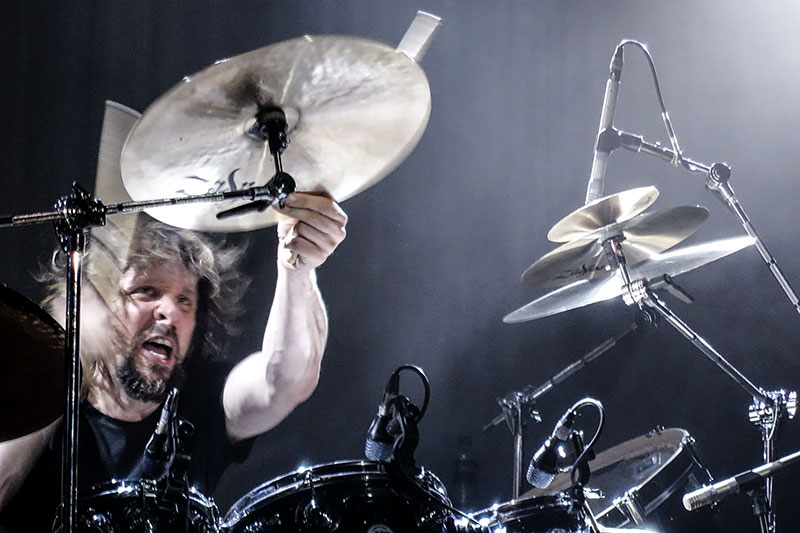
- Minnemann performing in 2016

Background information
- Born: 24 December 1970 (age 55); Hannover, West Germany
- Genres: Rock; heavy metal; progressive rock; electronica
- Occupations: Musician; composer; engineer; producer
- Instruments: Drums; percussion; guitar
- Member of: UKZ; The Aristocrats; The Mute Gods; The Sea Within; In Continuum
- Formerly of: Necrophagist; H-Blockx
- Website: marcominnemann.com

Marco Minnemann (born 24 December 1970) is a German multi-instrumentalist and composer who primarily plays drums.

== Career ==
Minnemann has released over a dozen solo albums as drummer, multi-instrumentalist, and vocalist, and performed on over 100 studio albums with dozens of artists and groups. He has previously been a member of the German funk-metal crossover band Freaky Fukin Weirdoz and has performed and recorded with German rock band H-Blockx and Grammy-nominated English musician Steven Wilson. He is the drummer for the Mute Gods, a trio led by Nick Beggs of British new wave band Kajagoogoo, and he has performed with Joe Satriani since 2013. Minnemann appeared on the cover of the June 2007 issue of Modern Drummer, with the magazine writing that "he has been instrumental in developing the advanced concept of complex interdependence", a drum technique allowing him to play varying patterns with each of his feet and hands.

In 2006, Minnemann recorded a 51-minute live drum solo that served as the basis for his Normalizer 2 project, in which he shared the track with several musicians and asked that they each write and record their own work accompanying the composition. A number of the resulting recordings were released as duo albums, including Trey Gunn's Modulator, Alex Machacek's 24 Tales, and Mike Keneally's Evidence of Humanity. In 2011, he auditioned to play with the American progressive rock band Dream Theater. It was ultimately decided that he would not join the group, as he did not know their discography very well and did not want to commit to them fully.

In late 2017, Minnemann joined international prog-rock rock supergroup the Sea Within and appears on their 2018 debut. Formed by Swedish guitarist and singer-songwriter Roine Stolt, the band also features bassist Jonas Reingold, guitarist Daniel Gildenlöw, and keyboardist Tom Brislin.

Minnemann is a member of instrumental rock power trio the Aristocrats, playing alongside Guthrie Govan and Bryan Beller. In 2019, the group released their fourth studio album, You know what...?

In 2020, Minnemann and collaborator Randy McStine formed McStine & Minnemann. The duo released two albums that year: the self-titled McStine & Minnemann and McStine & Minnemann II.

In October 2025, it was announced that Minneman would be joining Eddie Jobson, Mark Bonilla, and Mike Keneally on Jobson's U.K. Revisited tour for a three-date tour of Japan in February 2026, prior to co-headlining Cruise to the Edge, a progressive rock festival staged on board a cruise ship. In August 2026, it was announced that Minnemann would be re-joining U.K. Revisited for three U.S. dates in October, followed by seven January 2027 dates in Europe.

Minnemann was featured as a voice actor in the second season of the Titmouse-animated series Metalocalypse. The episode, which also featured Mike Patton of Faith No More, aired on Adult Swim in 2008.

== Books ==
- Ultimate Play Along Drum Trax
- Extreme Interdependence: Drumming Beyond Independence (with audio CD) – (2001)
- Maximum Minnemann (2006)

== DVDs ==
- Extreme Drumming (2003)
- The Marco Show (2006)
- Marco Minnemann: Live in L.A. (2007)

== Discography ==
Solo

- The Green Mindbomb (1998)
- Comfortably Homeless (1999)
- Orchids (2002)
- Broken Orange (2003)
- Normalizer (2003)
- Mieze (2004)
- Contraire de la chanson (2006)
- Housewifedogandtwokids (2007)
- A Mouth of God (2008)
- Catspoon (2009)
- Evil Smiles of Beauty/Sound of Crime (2012)
- Symbolic Fox (feat. Guthrie Govan) (2012)
- EEPS (2014)
- Celebration (2015)
- Above the Roses (2016)
- Schattenspiel (2016)
- Borrego (feat. Alex Lifeson and Joe Satriani) (2017)
- My Sister (feat. Alex Lifeson) (2019)
- Their Colors Fade (2023)

with Freaky Fukin Weirdoz

- Senseless Wonder (1992)
- Mao Mak Maa (1993)
- Culture Shock (1995)
- Hula (1997)

with Illegal Aliens

- Thickness (1995)
- Red Alibis (1997)
- Time (1999)
- International Telephone (2000)
- Swine Songs – Best Of (2006)

with H-Blockx

- Fly Eyes (1998)

Minnemann/Brinkmann

- Motor (2002)
- The Shining (2010)

Fabio Trentini, Marco Minneman, Mario Brinkmann

- Disarmed (2005)

Minnemann/Brinkmann/Trentini/Zimmer

- Play the Police (2007)

with UKZ

- Radiation (2009)

Normalizer 2

- Marco Minneman – Normalizer 2 (2010)
- Mike Keneally – Evidence of Humanity (2010)
- Jason Sadites – Behind the Laughter (2010)
- Trey Gunn – Modulator (2010)
- John Czajkowski – West ZooOpolis (2010)
- Mario Brinkmann – Normalizer 2 (2010)
- Alex Machacek – 24 Tales (2010)
- Phi Yaan-Zek – Dance with the Anima (2010)
- Jimmy Pitts – 2L82B Normal (2010)
- Aaron Ruimy – A Few Minor Modifications (2010)
- At War with Self – Circadian Rhythm Disorder (2015)

Phi Yaan-Zek with Marco Minnemann

- Deeper with the Anima (2012)

with Shiloh Sheray

- S+M (2011)

with the Aristocrats

- The Aristocrats (2011)
- Boing, We'll Do It Live! (2012)
- Culture Clash (2013)
- Live in Osaka (2014)
- Tres Caballeros (2015)
- You Know What...? (2019)
- The Aristocrats with Primuz Chamber Orchestra (2022)
- Duck (2024)

with Matte Henderson

- The Veneer of Logic (2013)

with Tony Levin and Jordan Rudess

- Levin Minnemann Rudess (2013)
- From the Law Offices of Levin Minnemann Rudess (2016)

Pitts Minnemann Project

- The Psychic Planetarium (2016)

with the Mute Gods

- Do Nothing till You Hear from Me (2016)
- Tardigrades Will Inherit the Earth (2017)
- Atheists and Believers (2019)

with the Sea Within

- The Sea Within (2018)

with Randy McStine

- McStine and Minnemann (2020)
- McStine and Minnemann II (2020)
- McStine and Minnemann III (2025)

== Selected recordings with other artists ==
2000s

- Paul Gilbert – Burning Organ (2000)
- Wolfgang Schmid – Special Kick (2002)
- Paddy Kelly – In Exile (2003)
- Nena – Nena feat. Nena (2002)
- Paul Gilbert – Spaceship One (2004)
- Paul Gilbert – Space Ship Live DVD (2005)
- Wolfgang Schmid – A Swift Kick (2005)
- Mario Brinkmann – Engineer (2007)
- Illogicist – The Insight Eye (2007)
- Necrophagist – Summer Slaughter Tour DVD (2008)
- Ephel Duath – Through My Dog's Eyes (2008)

2010s

- Eddie Jobson – Ultimate Zero Tour – Live (2010)
- Tony MacAlpine – Tony MacAlpine (2011)
- Paul Cusick – P'dice (2011)
- Mike Keneally/Andy Partridge – Wing Beat Fantastic (2012)
- Steven Wilson – Catalogue / Preserve / Amass (2012)
- Steven Wilson – Get All You Deserve (2012)
- Forward Shapes – Legacy (2012)
- Psyaxis – Black Dawn Rising (2012)
- Ephel Duath – On Death and Cosmos (2012)
- Steven Wilson – The Raven That Refused to Sing (And Other Stories) (2013)
- Ephel Duath – Hemmed by Light, Shaped by Darkness (2013)
- Mike Keneally – You Must Be This Tall (2013)
- Steven Wilson – Drive Home (2013)
- Nathan Frost – Synecron (2013)
- The Hushdown – Radio (2014)
- Syndone – Odysseas (2014)
- Steven Wilson – Hand. Cannot. Erase. (2015)
- Joe Satriani – Shockwave Supernova (2015)
- Amadeus Awad – Death Is Just a Feeling (2015)
- Plini – The End of Everything (2015)
- Mike Keneally – Scambot 2 (2016)
- Steven Wilson – 4½ (2016)
- Dewa Budjana – Mahandini (2018)
- Alberto Rigoni – EvoRevolution (2019)
- Jordan Rudess – Wired for Madness (2019)
- Yuval Ron – Somewhere in This Universe, Somebody Hits a Drum (2019)

2020s

- Alberto Rigoni – Odd Times (2020)
- Alberto Rigoni – Metal Addicted (2021)
- Jess Lewis – Seafoam (2021)
- Jan Rivera – Existential Paranoia (2022)
