= Steve Vai discography =

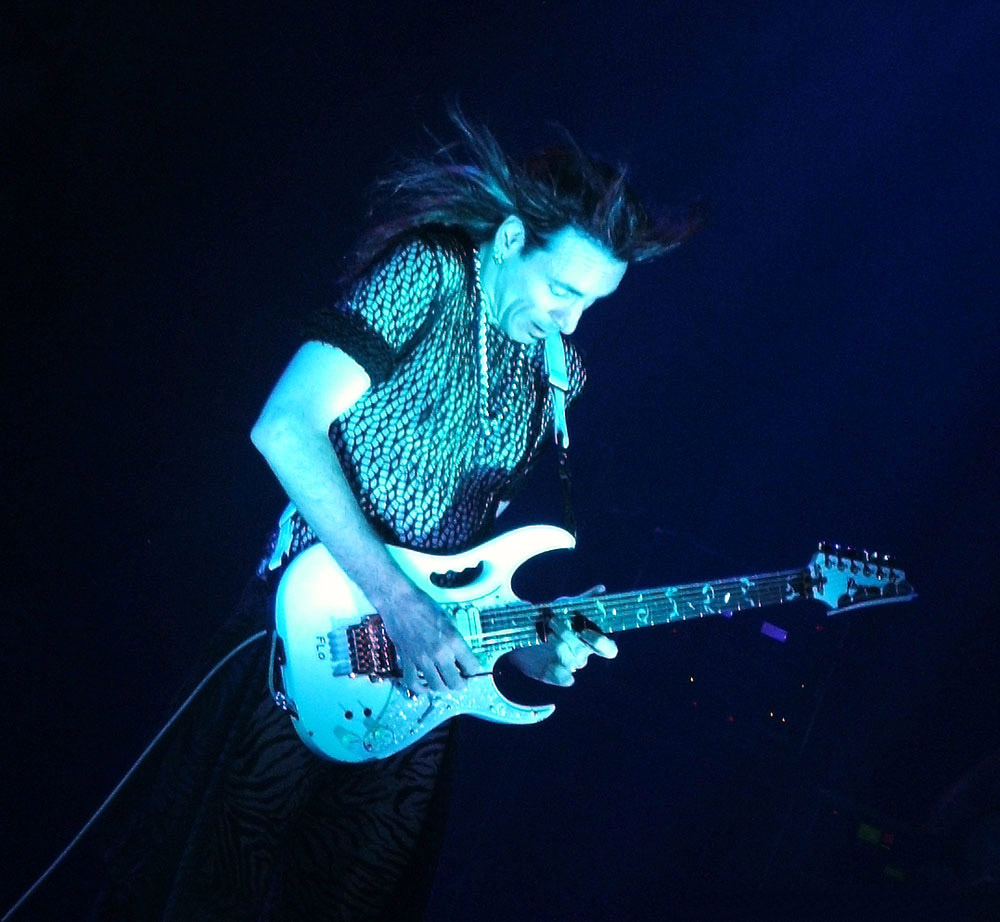
- Steve Vai in Milan (Alcatraz) on September 25, 2005
- Studio albums: 9
- Extended plays: 2
- Soundtrack albums: 12
- Live albums: 8
- Compilation albums: 20
- Other: 2
- Guest appearances: 44
- Videos: 7
- Awards and nominations: 62

Steve Vai is an American guitarist, songwriter and producer. He started his career in 1980 playing with Frank Zappa and has since recorded and toured with Alcatrazz, Whitesnake, David Lee Roth, and Public Image Ltd. Since 1983 Vai also released his own studio albums. His discography consists of eleven studio albums, two EPs, two special albums, eight live albums, twelve soundtracks, twenty compilation albums and seven videos. Vai has been awarded three Grammy Awards and forty other awards. Vai has also appeared as a guest musician on forty-four albums, as diverse as Motörhead, M83, and most recently for the second time with Jacob Collier.

== Studio albums ==
Title	Album details	Peak chart positions										Sales	Certifications
Title	Album details	US	AUS	FIN	FRA	GER	JPN	NLD	SWE	SWI	UK	Sales	Certifications
Flex-Able	Released: January, 1984; Label: Urantia; Formats: CD, LP, CS, digital download	—	—	—	—	—	—	—	—	—	—	US: 400,000	
Passion and Warfare	Released: May 22, 1990; Label: Relativity; Formats: CD, LP, CS, digital download	18	25	—	—	—	28	32	27	35	8	UK: 500,000	RIAA: Gold; BPI: Silver; CRIA: Gold
Sex & Religion	Released: July 27, 1993; Label: Relativity; Formats: CD, LP, digital download	48	67	—	—	53	—	26	41	26	17	US: 182,069	
Fire Garden	Released: September 17, 1996; Label: Epic; Formats: CD, LP, CS, digital download	106	179	22	30	—	18	85	—	—	41	US: 88,432	
Flex-Able Leftovers	Released: November 10, 1998; Label: Urantia; Formats: CD, LP, digital download	—	—	—	—	—	—	—	—	—	—	US: 14,913	
The Ultra Zone	Released: September 7, 1999; Label: Epic; Formats: CD, LP, CS, digital download	121	129	—	49	—	14	—	—	—	—	US: 41,395	
Real Illusions: Reflections	Released: February 22, 2005; Label: Epic; Formats: CD, digital download	147	—	—	110	—	34	88	—	—	127		
The Story of Light	Released: August 14, 2012; Label: Favored Nations; Formats: CD, CD+DVD, LP, digital download	78	—	43	136	79	36	75	—	—	129		
Modern Primitive	Released: June 24, 2016; Label: Epic; Formats: CD, LP, digital download	—	—	—	151	—	41	143	—	77	118		
Inviolate	Released: January 28, 2022; Label: Favored Nations; Formats: CD, LP, digital download	—	—	—	127	65	32	13	—	25	—		
Vai/Gash	Released: January 20, 2023; Label: Favored Nations; Formats: CD, LP, digital download	—	—	—	—	—	—	—	—	61	—		
"—" denotes a recording that did not chart or was not released in that territory.

== EPs ==
Title	EP details	Peak chart positions					Sales
Title	EP details	US	AUS	UK	NLD	JPN	Sales
Flex-Able Leftovers	Released: 1984; Label: Urantia; Formats: LP	—	—	—	—		
Alien Love Secrets	Released: March 21, 1995; Label: Relativity; Formats: CD, digital download	125	169	39	72	17	US: 103,116
"—" denotes a recording that did not chart or was not released in that territory.

== Live albums ==
Title	Album details	Peak chart positions				
Title	Album details	FIN	FRA	JPN	NLD	UK
G3: Live in Concert with Joe Satriani and Eric Johnson	Released: June 3, 1997; Label: Sony; Formats: CD, digital download	35	20	37	52	82
Alive in an Ultra World	Released: June 19, 2001; Label: Epic; Formats: CD, digital download	—	122	68	—	—
G3: Rockin' in the Free World with Joe Satriani and Yngwie Malmsteen	Released: February 24, 2004; Label: Epic Records; Formats: CD, digital download	—	156	—	—	—
Live in London	Released: June 20, 2004; Label: Favored Nations; Formats: CD, digital download	—	—	—	—	—
G3: Live in Tokyo with Joe Satriani and John Petrucci	Released: October 25, 2005; Label: Sony; Formats: CD, digital download	—	—	—	—	—
Sound Theories Vol. I & II	Released: June 26, 2007; Label: Epic; Formats: CD, digital download	—	138	96	97	—
Where the Wild Things Are	Released: September 29, 2009; Label: Favored Nations; Formats: CD, digital download	—	—	221	—	—
Stillness in Motion: Vai Live in L.A.	Released: April 7, 2015; Label: Legacy; Formats: CD, digital download	—	—	—	—	—
"—" denotes a recording that did not chart or was not released in that territory.

== Video albums ==
Title	Album details	Peak chart positions			Certifications
Title	Album details	US	JPN	SWE	Certifications
Alien Love Secrets	Released: 1995; Label: Hal Leonard; Formats: VHS, DVD	—	—	—	
G3: Live in Concert with Joe Satriani and Eric Johnson	Released: June 3, 1997; Label: Sony; Formats: VHS, DVD	—	—	—	
Live at the Astoria, London	Released: December 09, 2003; Label: Favored Nations; Formats: DVD	—	—	—	US: 2× Platinum
G3 Live: in Denver with Joe Satriani and Yngwie Malmsteen	Released: February 17, 2004; Label: Epic; Formats: DVD	5	—	2	US: Platinum
G3: Live in Tokyo with Joe Satriani and John Petrucci	Released: October 25, 2005; Label: Epic; Formats: DVD	17	—	—	
Visual Sound Theories	Released: June 26, 2007; Label: Epic; Formats: DVD	—	104	—	
Where the Wild Things Are	Released: September 29, 2009; Label: Favored Nations; Formats: DVD, Blu-ray	—	—	—	
Stillness in Motion: Vai Live in L.A.	Released: April 7, 2015; Label: Legacy; Formats: DVD, Blu-ray, Digital Download	—	—	—	
"—" denotes a recording that did not chart or was not released in that territory.

== Soundtracks ==
Year	Title	Type	Notes
1986	Crossroads: Released: 1986; Label: Warner	Motion Picture	All parts played by Vai also on The Elusive Light and Sound Vol. 1
1987	Dudes	Motion Picture	Vai performs "Amazing Grace"; This OST is out of print; Also on The Elusive Light and Sound Vol. 1
1987	Less than Zero: Released: November 6, 1987; Label: Def Jam	Motion Picture	Vai performs "Bump 'N Grind", which is not on the OST
1991	Bill & Ted's Bogus Journey: Released: June 9, 1991; Label: Interscope	Motion Picture	Vai performs the tracks "The Reaper" and "The Reaper Rap" and a few tracks which are not in the OST; Also on The Elusive Light and Sound Vol. 1
1992	Wayne's World: Released: February 18, 1992; Label: Reprise	Motion Picture	Vai performs with Joe Satriani on Alice Cooper's "Feed My Frankenstein"
1992	Encino Man	Motion Picture	Vai performs the track "Get the Hell Out Of Here"; Also on The Elusive Light and Sound Vol. 1
1994	PCU	Motion Picture	Vai scored this film, and contributed the track "Now We Run" to this soundtrack; The complete score also on The Elusive Light and Sound Vol. 1
1997	Formula 1	Video Game	Vai performs the track "Juice"
2001	Ghosts of Mars	Motion Picture	Vai performs on "Ghosts of Mars" and "Ghost Poppin'"
2004	Halo 2 Soundtrack Volume 1: Released: November 9, 2004; Label: Sumthing Else Music Works	Video Game	Vai performs on "Halo Theme Mjolnir Mix" and "Never Surrender"
2006	Halo 2 Soundtrack Volume 2: Released: April 25, 2006; Label: Sumthing Else Music Works	Video Game	Vai performs on "Reclaimer"
2008	Guitar Hero III: Legends of Rock: "Virtuoso Track Pack"	Video Game	Vai performs the track "For The Love Of God"
2014	Halo 2 Anniversary Original Soundtrack: Released: November 10, 2014; Label: INgrooves	Video Game	Vai performs on "Halo Theme Gungnir Mix" and "Genesong"

== Compilation albums ==
Year	Title	Notes
1993	Zappa's Universe: Released: 1993; Label: Verve	Tribute to Frank Zappa; Vai plays guitar on "Sofa" and "Dirty Love"
1995	In From The Storm: Released: October 24, 1995; Label: RCA Records	Tribute to Jimi Hendrix; Vai appears on "Drifting" and "Bold as Love"
1996	Songs of West Side Story: Released: January 30, 1996; Label: RCA Records	Vai appears on "The Rumble" (Steve Vai's Monsters vs. Chick Corea's Elektric Band II)
1997	Merry Axemas: A Guitar Christmas: Released: October 14, 1997; Label: Epic	Vai performs on "Christmas Time is Here" (with Joe Satriani, Jeff Beck, Eric Johnson and more)
1999	Radio Disney Kid Jams: Released: March 16, 1999; Label: Disney	Vai performs the track "Wipe Out"
2000	The 7th Song: Enchanting Guitar Melodies – Archives Vol. 1: Released: November 7, 2000; Label: Epic	Compilation of the 7th song of Vai's albums, and 3 previously unreleased tracks
2001	The Secret Jewel Box: Released: December 11, 2001; Label: Light Without Heat	10 CD collector box
2001	Frank Zappa Original Recordings; Steve Vai (Archives, Vol. 2): Released: December 11, 2001; Label: Light Without Heat	Vol.3 of The Secret Jewel Box (not sold separately)
2001	Roland Guitar Masters	Vai performs the tracks "Cliffs of Insanity" and "Misfits"
2002	The Elusive Light and Sound Vol. 1: Released: June 4, 2002; Label: Favored Nations	This disc collects Vai's many contributions to film music; Re-released as Vol.1 of The Secret Jewel Box
2002	Guitars For Freedom: Released: August 2, 2002; Label: Rock Empire	Vai contributed the track "Amazing Grace" to this benefit CD
2002	Warmth In The Wilderness Vol. II – A Tribute to Jason Becker: Released: December 31, 2002; Label: Lion	Vai performs the track "Feathers"
2003	Mystery Tracks – Archives Vol. 3: Released: 2003; Label: Favored Nations	Compilation of Vai's bonus tracks featured on Japanese releases of his CDs, along with promotional tracks, songs featured on other albums and unreleased/demo tracks; Vol.4 of The Secret Jewel Box
2003	Various Artists – Archives Vol. 4: Released: June 6, 2003; Label: Light Without Heat	Collection of songs Vai has contributed to other projects and records; Vol.5 of The Secret Jewel Box
2003	The Infinite Steve Vai: An Anthology: Released: November 18, 2003; Label: Epic	A career-spanning collection of 32 digitally remastered tracks over 2 CDs (including work with other artists such as Alcatrazz and Whitesnake)
2004	Piano Reductions Vol. 1: Performed by Mike Keneally: Released: November 16, 2004; Label: Epic	This is an album of 11 solo acoustic piano interpretations of Vai songs by Mike Keneally; Vol.6 of The Secret Jewel Box
2005	The Sounds Of NASCAR: Released: October 18, 2005; Label: Cherry Lane Records	Vai is featured on the track "Rush"
2008	Steve Vai Original Album Classics: Released: 2008; Label: RCA Records	Box set re-release with Flex-Able, Passion and Warfare, Sex and Religion, Alien Love Secrets and Fire Garden
2010	Playlist: The Very Best of Steve Vai: Released: January 26, 2010; Label: Epic	
2011	The Essential Steve Vai: Released: March 15, 2011; Label: Epic	

== Other recordings ==
Year	Title	Notes
1990	In My Dreams with You	Promo three-track CD to promote Sex & Religion
1998	Bad Squad	Promo five-track CD from Morley to promote the Bad Horsie wah pedal
2005	Naked Tracks	Five-CD package containing a large selection of tracks from the Vai catalog that have been mixed without the main lead and melody guitar tracks

== As band member ==
Year	Artist	Album	Peak chart positions										Certifications	Notes
Year	Artist	Album	US	AUT	CAN	FIN	GER	NED	NOR	SWE	SWI	UK	Certifications	Notes
1981	Frank Zappa	Tinsel Town Rebellion	66	9	—	—	23	—	13	8	—	55		Live
1981	Frank Zappa	Shut Up 'n Play Yer Guitar	—	—	—	—	—	—	—	—	—	—		Live
1981	Frank Zappa	You Are What You Is	93	—	—	—	—	—	12	22	—	51		
1982	Frank Zappa	Ship Arriving Too Late to Save a Drowning Witch	23	—	—	—	65	—	20	26	—	61		
1983	Frank Zappa	The Man from Utopia	153	—	—	—	—	—	—	23	—	87		
1984	Frank Zappa	Them or Us	—	—	—	—	—	—	—	—	—	—		
1984	Frank Zappa	Thing-Fish	—	—	—	—	—	—	—	—	—	—		
1985	Frank Zappa	Frank Zappa Meets the Mothers of Prevention	153	—	—	—	—	—	—	—	—	—		
1985	Alcatrazz	Disturbing the Peace	—	—	—	—	—	—	—	—	—	—		
1986	Frank Zappa	Jazz from Hell	—	—	—	—	—	—	—	—	—	—		
1986	David Lee Roth	Eat 'Em and Smile	4	—	13	5	—	57	—	12	19	28	RIAA: Platinum; BPI: Gold	
1986	Public Image Ltd	Album	115	—	—	—	—	—	—	—	—	14		
1988	Frank Zappa	Guitar	—	25	—	—	40	—	—	—		82		Live
1988	Frank Zappa	You Can't Do That on Stage Anymore, Vol. 1	—	—	—	—	—	—	—	—	—	—		Live
1988	David Lee Roth	Skyscraper	6	—	6	1	—	39	—	13	13	11	RIAA: Platinum; BPI: Gold	
1989	Frank Zappa	You Can't Do That on Stage Anymore, Vol. 3	—	—	—	—	—	—	—	—	—	—		Live
1989	Whitesnake	Slip of the Tongue	10	29	18	—	19	43	9	11	11	10	BPI: Gold; RIAA: Platinum	
1991	Frank Zappa	You Can't Do That on Stage Anymore, Vol. 4	—	—	—	—	—	—	—	—	—	—		Live
1991	Frank Zappa	As an Am	—	—	—	—	—	—	—	—	—	—		Live
1992	Frank Zappa	You Can't Do That on Stage Anymore, Vol. 5	—	—	—	—	—	—	—	—	—	—		Live
1992	Frank Zappa	You Can't Do That on Stage Anymore, Vol. 6	—	—	—	—	—	—	—	—	—	—		Live
2011	Whitesnake	Live at Donington 1990	—	—	—	—	32	—	—	—	—	81		Live

== Guest appearances ==
Year	Artist	Title	Notes
1983	Lisa Popeil	Lisa Popeil	
1985	Heresy	At the Door	Vai performs on "London: 1941" and "Wasted Moments"
1986	Bob Harris	The Great Nostalgia	Vai performs on "Autumn in Nepal" and "There's Still Hope"
1986	Randy Coven	Funk Me Tender	Vai performs on "Funk Me Tender"
1986	Western Vacation	Western Vacation	Vai performs on "Western Vacation" under the name "Reckless Fable"
1986	Shankar & Caroline	The Epidemics	
1987	Danny Mendez	Death to All Mankind	
1990	Rebecca	The Best of Dreams	Vai performs on "Supergirl"
1991	Alice Cooper	Hey Stoopid	Vai performs with Joe Satriani on "Feed My Frankenstein"
1995	Ozzy Osbourne	Ozzmosis	Vai co-wrote the song "My Little Man"
1996	Wild Style	Cryin'	Vai performs on "Let It Go"
1997	Angelica	Angelica	Vai performs on "Der Holle Rache (Queen of the Night)"; Also features Steve Stevens, Eric Johnson and Dweezil Zappa
1997	Munetaka Higuchi with Dream Castle	Free World	Vai plays guitar and bass on the track "Speed"
1998	Gregg Bissonette	Gregg Bissonette	Vai performs on "Common Road"
1998	Al Di Meola	The Infinite Desire	Vai performs on "Race with the Devil on Turkish Highway"
1999	Joe Jackson	Symphony No. 1	
2000	Gregg Bissonette	Submarine	Vai performs on "Noah's Ark"
2000	Thana Harris	Thanatopsis	Vai performs on "Fingers"
2000	Andrew Dice Clay	Face Down, Ass Up	
2001	Robin DiMaggio	Blue Planet	Vai performs on "Mallorca" with L. Shankar
2001	Billy Sheehan	Compression	Vai appears on "Chameleon"
2002	Tak Matsumoto	Hana	
2002	G.T.O.	"I'll Be Around" (single)	G.T.O. (Girls Together Outrageously) is a Dutch trio who released a cover version of Vai's "I'll Be Around", the CD single features a Radio Version (3:28) and an Extended Version (4:40), Vai performs the guitar solo on the Radio Version
2003	Surinder Sandhu	Saurang Orchestra	Vai performs on "Amirah", "The Little Hindu", "Movement One: Twice Born", "Movement Two: Sunday Morning in Calcutta", "Movement Three: Tradition of the New"
2003	Eric Sardinas	Black Pearls	Vai performs on "Green Tea"
2003	Steve Lukather & Friends	Santamental	Vai performs on "Carol of the Bells"
2003	Hughes Turner Project	HTP 2	Vai appears on "Losing My Head"
2003	Shankar & Gingger	One in a Million	Vai performs on "Out Of My Mind"
2003	The Yardbirds	Birdland	Vai performs on "Shapes of Things"
2004	Motörhead	Inferno	Vai appears on "Terminal Show" and "Down on Me"
2004	Bob Carpenter	The Sun, the Moon, the Stars	Features a piano interpretation of “Whispering a Prayer”; Features Vai on acoustic guitar and Pia Vai on harp
2005	John 5	Songs for Sanity	Vai appears on the song "Perineum"
2006	The Devin Townsend Band	Synchestra	Vai performs an extended guitar solo on "Triumph"
2006	Marty Friedman	Loudspeaker	Vai performs on "Viper
2006	Meat Loaf	Bat Out of Hell III: The Monster Is Loose	Vai performs on "In the Land of the Pig, the Butcher is King"
2007	Dream Theater	Systematic Chaos	Spoken words on "Repentance"
2007	Eros Ramazzotti	e²	Vai performs on, produced and re-recorded "Dove C'e' Musica"
2008	Jason Becker	Collection	Vai performs on "River Of Longing (Reprise)" with Marty Friedman
2009	Spinal Tap	Back from the Dead	Vai performs on "Short And Sweet"
2009	Mike Stern	Big Neighborhood	Vai performs guitar on "Big Neighborhood" and sitar on "Moroccan Roll"
2009	Orianthi	Believe	Vai appears on and co-wrote "Highly Strung"
2010	Meat Loaf	Hang Cool Teddy Bear	Vai performs on "Love Is Not Real / Next Time You Stab Me in the Back" and "Song of Madness"
2011	Steve Kusaba	Centrifugal Satz Clock: Morning	Vai performs on "We Run This Place"
2012	Joe Jackson	The Duke	Vai performs on "Isfahan"
2013	Iwrestledabearonce	Late for Nothing	Vai performs on "Carnage Asada"
2013	Devin Townsend	The Retinal Circus	Vai provides narration and acts as the show's host
2018	Jason Becker	Triumphant Hearts	Vai performs on "Valley of Fire"
2019	Devin Townsend	Empath	Vai performs on "Here Comes the Sun!"
2019	Jacob Collier	Djesse Vol. 2	Vai performs on "Do You Feel Love" and "Outro"
2020	Alcatrazz	Born Innocent	Vai co-wrote "Dirty Like the City"
2022	Star One	Revel in Time	Vai performs on "Lost Children of the Universe"
2022	Polyphia	Remember That You Will Die	Vai performs on "Ego Death"
2023	Pádraigín Ní Uallacháin	Seven Daughters of the Sea	Vai performs on title track "Seven Daughters of the Sea". Vai had covered Ní Uallacháin's 'Mullach an tSí'.
2024	Jacob Collier	Djesse Vol. 4	Vai performs on "100,000 Voices", "She Put Sunshine" and "Box of Stars Pt. 2".

== Videos ==
=== With other artists ===
Year	Type	Title	Artist	Notes
1982	VHS / DVD	The Dub Room Special	Frank Zappa	Vai appears 58 minutes into this video performing "Stevie's Spanking" (from The Palladium, NYC show on October 31, 1981)
1985	VHS	Power Live	Alcatrazz	Live concert recorded at Shinjuku Kousei Nenkin Hall (Japan) on October 10, 1984
1986	VHS	David Lee Roth	David Lee Roth	Vai performs on "Yankee Rose" and "Goin' Crazy!"; Also an alternate video take for Vai's guitar solo during the "Goin' Crazy!" video
1987	VHS	Video from Hell	Frank Zappa	Vai appears 11:15 minutes into this video performing "Stevie's Spanking" (Rome, Italy – July 10, 1982)
1989	VHS	The True Story of 200 Motels	Frank Zappa	Vai appears 41:33 minutes into this video – in a brief interview shot on July 14, 1982, in Palermo, Sicily
1990	VHS	Metal Head Vol.2	BMG Video Magazine	This hard to find "video magazine" features an interview with Vai
1993	VHS / DVD	Zappa's Universe: A Celebration of 25 Years of Frank Zappa's Music	Various artists	Vai performs on "Dirty Love" (with Dweezil), and "Sofa", a performance that won a Grammy
1997	VHS / DVD	7th Heaven video by Ibanez	Ibanez various artists	Ibanez promotional-only video includes commentary and music from Vai, Head & Munky from Korn, John Petrucci, Dino Cazares, Andy Timmons, Wes Borland, Jerry Sims
2003	DVD	Rockthology	Various artists	Features the "I Would Love To" promo video
2003	DVD	The Satch Tapes	Joe Satriani	Originally released on VHS in 1993; This DVD re-release features a brief interview with Vai circa 1992
2004	DVD	Crossroads Guitar Festival	Various artists	Vai and band performing “Get The Hell Outta Here"

=== Movies (as an actor) ===
Year	Type	Title	Notes
1986	VHS / DVD	Crossroads	Steve appears in this movie as "Jack Butler", a devil guitarist
2005	DVD	Bill & Ted's Most Excellent Collection	Bonus feature : "Score! An Interview With Guitarist Steve Vai."
2008	DVD	Crazy	Steve appears in this movie as "Hank Williams"
2008	DVD	Tattooed	Steve appears in this movie as himself
2009	TV	Metalocalypse	Animated TV series; Steve appears as guest Voice on episode No. 39 "Renovationklok" and No. 40 "Tributeklok"

== Awards and nominations ==
Steve Vai awards and nominations
Awards and nominations
Award	Wins	Nominations
Grammy	3	11
Guitar Player	12	16
Guitar World	5	5
International Music Award	0	1
Select	3	3
Guitar for the Practicing Musician	6	6
Kerrang!	3	3
Young Guitar Magazine	2	2
Rock Brigade Brazilian Magazine	2	2
RAW	1	5
Player	0	1
Making Music	3	3
Metal Hammer	1	1
California Music Awards	0	1
Golden Stag Awards Romania	1	1
TEC Awards	1	1

Totals (Note: Certain award groups do not simply award one winner. They acknowledge several different recipients, have runners-up, and have third place. Since this is a specific recognition and is different from losing an award, runner-up mentions are considered wins in this award tally. For simplification and to avoid errors, each award in this list has been presumed to have had a prior nomination.)
- Wins: 43
- Nominations: 62

=== Grammy Awards ===
Year	Nominee / work	Award	Result
1990	Passion and Warfare	Best Rock Instrumental Album	Nominated
1994	"Sofa" from Zappa's Universe	Best Rock Instrumental Performance	Won
1995	"Tender Surrender" from Alien Love Secrets	Best Rock Instrumental Performance	Nominated
1997	"For the Love of God" from G3: Live in Concert	Best Rock Instrumental Performance	Nominated
1999	"Windows to the Soul" from The Ultra Zone	Best Rock Instrumental Performance	Nominated
2001	"Whispering a Prayer" from Alive in an Ultra World	Best Rock Instrumental Performance	Nominated
2001	No Substitutions	Best Pop Instrumental Album	Won
2006	"Lotus Feet"	Best Rock Instrumental Performance	Nominated
2008	"The Attitude Song"	Best Rock Instrumental Performance	Nominated
2009	"Peaches En Regalia" from Zappa Plays Zappa	Best Rock Instrumental Performance	Won
2010	"Now We Run" from Where the Wild Things Are	Best Rock Instrumental Performance	Nominated

=== Other awards ===
Year	Award		Result
1986	Guitar Player	Best Rock Guitarist	Won
1986	Guitar for the Practicing Musician	Guitar in the 90's Award	Won
1987	Guitar Player	Best Overall Guitarist	Won
1987	Guitar Player	Best Rock Guitarist	Won
1987	Guitar for the Practicing Musician	Hall of Fame	Won
1988	Guitar Player	Best Rock Guitarist	Won
1988	Guitar for the Practicing Musician	Rock Guitarist of the Year	Won
1989	Guitar Player	Best Rock Guitarist	Won
1989	Guitar World	Best Rock Guitarist	Won
1989	Kerrang!	Best Rock Guitarist	Won
1990	Guitar Player	Best Metal Guitarist	Won
1990	Guitar Player	Best Guitar Album	Won
1990	Guitar Player	Best Overall Guitarist	Won
1990	Guitar Player	Best Rock Guitarist	Won
1990	Guitar World	Best Guitar Solo ("For the Love of God")	Won
1990	Guitar World	Best Rock Guitarist	Won
1990	Guitar World	Best Album (Passion and Warfare)	Won
1990	Guitar World	Most Valued Player (tie with Stevie Ray Vaughan)	Won
1990	Select	Best Album (Passion and Warfare)	Won
1990	Select	Best Musician	Won
1990	Select	Sexiest Male	Won
1990	International Music Award	Best Guitarist	Nominated
1990	Guitar for the Practicing Musician	Best Instrumental Guitarist of the Year	Won
1990	Guitar for the Practicing Musician	Reader's Choice – Guitar Album of the Year (Passion and Warfare)	Won
1990	Kerrang!	Guitarist of the Year	Won
1990	RAW	Best Selling LP Sleeve	Won
1990	RAW	Best RAW Cover (3rd place)	Nominated
1990	RAW	Best Selling Promo Video ("I Would Love To" – 5th place)	Nominated
1990	RAW	Best Sex Object (6th place)	Nominated
1990	RAW	Best Selling Promo Video ("The Audience is Listening" – 7th place)	Nominated
1990	Making Music	Best Musician	Won
1990	Making Music	Best Guitarist	Won
1990	Making Music	Best Album (Passion and Warfare)	Won
1990	Metal Hammer	Best Guitarist (Reader's Poll)	Won
1991	Young Guitar Magazine	Best Rock Guitarist	Won
1993	Guitar for the Practicing Musician	Editor's Choice Award	Won
1993	Kerrang!	Best Hard Rock Performance	Won
1995	Guitar Player	Gallery of Greats	Won
1995	Guitar Player	Best Experimental Guitarist (tie with Buckethead)	Won
1995	Guitar Player	Best Rock Guitarist (tie with Jimmy Page)	Won
1995	Guitar Player	Best Overall Guitar Recording (2nd place)	Nominated
1995	Guitar Player	Best Metal Guitarist (3rd place)	Nominated
1995	Guitar Player	Best Metal Recording (3rd place)	Nominated
1995	Guitar Player	Best Overall Guitarist (3rd place)	Nominated
1995	Player	Best Hard Rock Guitarist (2nd place)	Nominated
1996	Rock Brigade Brazilian Magazine	Best Guitarist	Won
1997	Young Guitar Magazine	Best Rock Guitarist	Won
1997	Rock Brigade Brazilian Magazine	Best Guitarist	Won
2001	California Music Awards	Outstanding Guitarist	Nominated
2009	Golden Stag Awards Romania	Excellence Prize	Won
2011	TEC Awards	Les Paul Award	Won

== See also ==
- List of rock instrumentals
- Steve Vai songs
