= The Infinite Steve Vai: An Anthology =

Compilation album by Steve Vai
- Released: November 18, 2003
- Recorded: 1984–2002
- Genre: Instrumental rock, hard rock, rock, heavy metal
- Length: 2:35:01
- Label: Epic/Legacy
- Producer: Steve Vai, Mike Clink, Keith Olsen

Steve Vai chronology
| Various Artists - Archives Vol. 4 (2003) | The Infinite Steve Vai: An Anthology (2003) | Piano Reductions Vol. 1 (2004) |

Professional ratings
Review scores
| Source | Rating |
|---|---|
| Allmusic | 4/5 stars |

The Infinite Steve Vai: An Anthology is Steve Vai's compilation album that was released in 2003 (see 2003 in music). This two-disc compilation spans Vai's entire solo career, featuring the best tracks from most of his albums including Fire Garden, Passion and Warfare, Alien Love Secrets and The Ultra Zone. One song is even included from his Whitesnake days ("Kittens Got Claws") and one from his Alcatrazz days ("Lighter Shade of Green"). The songs on the album do not appear chronologically relative to Vai's career.

This album mirrors Joe Satriani's album The Electric Joe Satriani: An Anthology. This is because both artists styles are very distinctive, but similar too, and Joe Satriani was Steve Vai's teacher at one point, which influenced his style.

In March 2011, the album was re-released as part of Sony BMG's The Essential series, named The Essential Steve Vai.

== Track listing ==
All songs written by Steve Vai except where noted.

=== Disc one ===
| No. | Title | Writer(s) | Origin | Length |
|---|---|---|---|---|
| 1. | "Liberty" | | Passion and Warfare, 1990 | 2:04 |
| 2. | "Die to Live" | | Alien Love Secrets, 1995 | 3:53 |
| 3. | "The Attitude Song" | | Flex-Able, 1984 | 3:22 |
| 4. | "Salamanders in the Sun" | | Flex-Able | 2:25 |
| 5. | "The Animal" | | Passion and Warfare | 4:02 |
| 6. | "The Riddle" | | Passion and Warfare | 6:26 |
| 7. | "For the Love of God" | | Passion and Warfare | 6:03 |
| 8. | "Bangkok" | Björn Ulvaeus, Tim Rice | Fire Garden, 1996 | 2:46 |
| 9. | "Fire Garden Suite: Bull Whip/Pusa Road/Angel Food/Taurus Bulba" | | Fire Garden | 9:56 |
| 10. | "Ya-Yo Gakk" | | Alien Love Secrets | 2:54 |
| 11. | "Blue Powder" | | Passion and Warfare | 4:44 |
| 12. | "Bad Horsie" | | Alien Love Secrets | 5:52 |
| 13. | "Tender Surrender" | | Alien Love Secrets | 5:05 |
| 14. | "All About Eve" | | Fire Garden | 4:38 |
| 15. | "Dyin' Day" | | Fire Garden | 4:29 |
| 16. | "The Blood & Tears" | | The Ultra Zone, 1999 | 4:25 |
| 17. | "The Silent Within" | | The Ultra Zone | 5:00 |
| Total length: | | | | 78:17 |

=== Disc two ===
| No. | Title | Writer(s) | Origin | Length |
|---|---|---|---|---|
| 1. | "Feathers" | | Warmth in the Wilderness, Vol. 2: A Tribute to Jason Becker, 2001 | 5:11 |
| 2. | "Frank" | | The Ultra Zone | 5:08 |
| 3. | "Boston Rain Melody" | | The 7th Song: Enchanting Guitar Melodies – Archives Vol. 1, 2000 | 4:39 |
| 4. | "Kittens Got Claws" | David Coverdale, Adrian Vandenberg | Slip of the Tongue (Whitesnake album), 1989 | 4:59 |
| 5. | "Lighter Shade of Green" | | Disturbing the Peace (Alcatrazz album), 1985 | 0:47 |
| 6. | "Giant Balls of Gold" | | Alive in an Ultra World, 2001 | 4:45 |
| 7. | "Whispering a Prayer" | | Alive in an Ultra World | 8:47 |
| 8. | "Jibboom" | | The Ultra Zone | 3:45 |
| 9. | "Windows to the Soul" | | The Ultra Zone | 6:26 |
| 10. | "Brandos Costumes (Gentle Ways)" | | Alive in an Ultra World | 6:05 |
| 11. | "The Reaper" | | Bill & Ted's Bogus Journey: Music from the Motion Picture, 1991 | 3:26 |
| 12. | "Christmas Time Is Here" | Vince Guaraldi, Lee Mendelson | Merry Axemas: A Guitar Christmas, 1997 | 4:21 |
| 13. | "Essence" | | Mystery Tracks – Archives Vol. 3, 2003 | 5:51 |
| 14. | "Rescue Me or Bury Me" | | Sex & Religion, 1993 | 8:26 |
| 15. | "Burnin' Down the Mountain" | | Flex-Able Leftovers, 1984 | 4:21 |
| Total length: | | | | 77:06 |
