= The Seventh Song =

The 7th Song: Enchanting Guitar Melodies – Archives Vol. 1

Compilation album by Steve Vai
- Released: November 7, 2000
- Genre: Instrumental rock
- Length: 61:43
- Label: Epic
- Producer: Steve Vai

Steve Vai chronology
The 7th Song: Enchanting Guitar Melodies – Archives Vol. 1 (2000)	The Secret Jewel Box (2001)

Professional ratings
Review scores
Source	Rating
Allmusic	3/5 stars

The 7th Song: Enchanting Guitar Melodies – Archives Vol. 1 is a 2000 album by guitarist Steve Vai. It is his first compilation album, but unlike a standard "greatest hits" or "best of" album, all of the songs on it (save for the three new tracks and the hidden track) can be found on one of Vai's previous albums as the 7th track. The 7th track on each of his albums is meant to be the most emotional and well articulated piece on the album. "Christmas Time is Here", while not previously released on a Vai album, can nonetheless be found as the 7th track on the 1996 Christmas compilation, Merry Axemas.

The new songs on this album are "Melissa's Garden" (which does occupy the 7th track), "The Wall of Light", and "Boston Rain Melody". The track for "Boston Rain Melody" continues on to contain the unlisted song "Warm Regards", the instrumental finale to Vai's 1996 album, Fire Garden. It is believed that Vai originally planned for the song to be the seventh track of the second disc, but when he discovered 80 minute CDs, he restructured the album to fit on one disc.

== Track listing ==
All songs written by Steve Vai except "Christmas Time is Here" by Vince Guaraldi and Lee Mendelson

1. "For the Love of God" – 6:09 (from "Passion and Warfare")
2. "Touching Tongues" – 5:32 (from "Sex and Religion")
3. "Windows to the Soul" – 6:25 (from "The Ultra Zone")
4. "Burnin' Down the Mountain" – 4:19 (from "Flex-Able Leftovers")
5. "Tender Surrender" – 5:10 (from "Alien Love Secrets")
6. "Hand on Heart" – 5:26 (from "Fire Garden")
7. "Melissa's Garden" – 7:54 (previously unreleased)
8. "Call it Sleep" – 5:04 (from "Flex-Able")
9. "Christmas Time Is Here" – 4:13 (from the compilation : "Merry Axemas: A Guitar Christmas")
10. "The Wall of Light" – 2:38 (previously unreleased)
11. "Boston Rain Melody" – 4:39 (previously unreleased)
