= Piano Reductions Vol. 1 =

Compilation album by Steve Vai and Mike Keneally
- Released: November 16, 2004
- Recorded: 2004
- Genre: Instrumental contemporary classical, neoclassical piano rock
- Length: 68:45
- Label: Epic
- Producer: Steve Vai

Steve Vai chronology
The Infinite Steve Vai: An Anthology (2003)	Piano Reductions Vol.1 (2004)	Steve Vai Original Album Classics (2008)

Mike Keneally chronology
Wooden Smoke Asleep (2001)	Piano Reductions Vol.1 (2004)	Wine and Pickles (2008)

Professional ratings
Review scores
Source	Rating
AllMusic	3/5 stars

Piano Reductions Vol. 1 is an instrumental album produced by Steve Vai. This is an album of 11 solo acoustic piano interpretations of songs Vai originally wrote for guitar and rock band, performed by Mike Keneally. Both Vai and Keneally performed in Frank Zappa's band in the 1980s. The album was recorded and released in 2004.
This album is Volume 6 in Vai's collection The Secret Jewel Box.

== Track listing ==
All songs written by Steve Vai, except "Pig" by Devin Townsend & Steve Vai

No.	Title	Original Album	Length
1.	"All About Eve"	Fire Garden	5:10
2.	"Die To Live"	Alien Love Secrets	6:11
3.	"Salamanders in the Sun"	Flex-Able	3:41
4.	"Bledsoe Bluvd"	Flex-Able Leftovers	5:51
5.	"Ballerina 12/24"	Passion and Warfare	1:46
6.	"Dyin' Day"	Fire Garden	5:31
7.	"Touching Tongues"	Sex and Religion	5:32
8.	"Kill the Guy with the Ball/The God Eaters"	Alien Love Secrets	8:39
9.	"Sisters"	Passion and Warfare	4:38
10.	"Pig"	Sex and Religion	4:24
11.	"Junkie"	Flex-Able	7:35
