= The Classified =

American progressive rock band

The Classified was a progressive rock band formed in California in 1984, whose foremost player was Steve Vai on guitar and vocals. It also included:

- Stu Hamm – bass, vocals
- Tommy Mars – keyboards, vocals
- Sue Mathis – keys and vox
- Mike Barsimanto – drums
- Chris Frazier – drums

The band never released any commercial recordings, though concert tapes exist.
