= Alive in an Ultra World =

Live album by Steve Vai
- Released: June 19, 2001
- Recorded: January 27, 2000 – April 21, 2000
- Genre: Instrumental rock
- Length: 93:20
- Label: Epic Records

Steve Vai chronology
G3: Live in Concert (1997)	Alive in an Ultra World (2001)	G3: Rockin' in the Free World (2004)

Professional ratings
Review scores
Source	Rating
Allmusic	3/5 stars
Kerrang!	2/5 stars

Alive in an Ultra World is a live album by Steve Vai, recorded during The Ultra Zone world tour in 2000, and released in 2001. The songs compiled on this album were written specifically for the countries that Vai and his band were visiting. All of the songs were first released on this album, with the exception of "Devil's Food", which was originally released on Vai's 1996 album Fire Garden. Due to logistical complications, some songs could not be recorded in the nation they were written for.

== Track listing ==
All songs written by Steve Vai.

=== Disc 1 ===
1. "Giant Balls of Gold" – 4:45
  - Song for Poland
2. "Burning Rain" – 4:50
  - Song for Japan
3. "The Black Forest" – 6:38
  - Song for Germany
4. "Alive in an Ultra World" – 3:53
  - Song for Slovenia
5. "Devil's Food" – 10:09
  - Song for The Netherlands
6. "Blood and Glory" – 4:53
  - Song for the United Kingdom
7. "Whispering a Prayer" – 8:45
  - Song for Ireland
8. "Iberian Jewel" – 4:38
  - Song for Spain

=== Disc 2 ===
1. "The Power of Bombos" – 5:04
  - Song for Greece
2. "Incantation" – 8:53
  - Song for Bulgaria
3. "Light of the Moon" – 5:47
  - Song for Australia
4. "Babushka" – 6:42
  - Song for Romania
5. "Being with You (In Paris)" – 6:24
  - Song for France
6. "Principessa" – 5:51
  - Song for Italy
7. "Brandos Costumes (Gentle Ways)" – 6:04
  - Song for Portugal
8. "Maple Leafs (Japan Bonus Track)" – 2:28
  - Song for Canada
