= Stillness in Motion: Vai Live in L.A. =

Live album by Steve Vai
- Released: April 7, 2015
- Recorded: October 12, 2012
- Venue: Club Nokia, Los Angeles
- Genre: Instrumental rock
- Length: 2:11:19
- Label: Sony Music Entertainment and Legacy Recordings

Steve Vai chronology
The Story of Light (2012)	Stillness in Motion: Vai Live in L.A. (2015)	Modern Primitive (2016)

Professional ratings
Review scores
Source	Rating
AllMusic	3.5/5 stars
Louder Sound	4/5 stars
Record Collector	4/5 stars

Stillness in Motion: Vai Live in L.A. is a live album by American virtuoso guitarist Steve Vai, released on 7 April 2015, on the Sony Music Entertainment and Legacy Recordings labels.

The album features a recording of a performance by Vai in October 2012 at Club Nokia in Los Angeles, which was part of the Story of Light world tour; it was the 49th show on this tour.

== Track listing ==
Disc 1

1. Intro/Racing the World
2. Velorum
3. Band Intros
4. Building the Church
5. Tender Surrender
6. Gravity Storm
7. Weeping China Doll
8. John the Revelator
9. The Moon and I
10. The Animal
11. Whispering a Prayer

Disc 2

1. The Audience Is Listening
2. Rescue Me or Bury Me
3. Sisters
4. Treasure Island
5. Salamanders In the Sun
6. Pusa Road
7. Frank
8. The Ultra Zone (CD Version)
9. Build Me a Song L.A.
10. For The Love of God
11. Taurus Bulba

== Personnel ==
- Steve Vai – Guitar, vocals
- Dave Weiner – Guitar, keyboards, vocals
- Philip Bynoe – Bass, vocals
- Jeremy Colson – Drums, vocals
- Deborah Henson-Conant – Electric harp, vocals
- Beverly McClellan – Vocals
