= Flex-Able Leftovers (album) =

Studio album by Steve Vai
- Released: 10 November 1998
- Recorded: 1982–1998
- Genre: Rock
- Length: 54:10

Steve Vai chronology
Fire Garden (1996)	Flex-Able Leftovers (1998)	The Ultra Zone (1999)

Professional ratings
Review scores
Source	Rating
Allmusic	4/5 stars

Flex-Able Leftovers is the fifth studio album by the American guitarist Steve Vai, released on November 10, 1998, through Sony Records. It contains five bonus tracks and is quite different from the original Flex-Able Leftovers EP. Unlike Steve Vai's other albums, which are mostly instrumental, almost all copies of Flex-Able Leftovers feature a Parental Advisory label, as a result of the song "Fuck Yourself" containing multiple profanities and sexual references. Other differences from the original version include the recording of live drums on "You Didn't Break It!" (The original used a drum machine) and the complete re-editing and mixing of the songs.

== Track listing ==
All songs written by Steve Vai, except where noted.

1. "Fuck Yourself" (Listed as #?@! Yourself) (Bonus Ed. 1998) – 8:27
2. "So Happy" (Vai, Laurel Fishman) – 2:43
3. "Bledsoe Bluvd" – 4:22
4. "Natural Born Boy" (Bonus Ed. 1998) – 3:34
5. "Details at 10" – 5:58
6. "Massacre" (Bonus Ed. 1998) – 3:25
7. "Burnin' Down the Mountain" – 4:22
8. "Little Pieces of Seaweed" – 5:12 (Vai, Larry Kutcher)
9. "San Sebastian" (Bonus Ed. 1998) – 1:08
10. "The Beast of Love" (Joe Kearney) – 3:30
11. "You Didn't Break it" (Bob Harris, Suzannah Harris) (1998 Version, with Robin DiMaggio (Drums)) – 4:19
12. "The X-Equilibrium Dance" (Bonus Ed. 1998) – 5:10
13. "Chronic Insomnia" – 2:00

More Information on This Edition (Discogs)

== Credits ==
=== Instrumental contributions ===
- Steve Vai – vocals, acoustic and electric guitars, coral sitar, keyboards, electric piano, bass guitar, background vocals
- Mike Keneally – keyboards on "Fuck Yourself"
- Tommy Mars – vocals, violin, keyboards
- Stu Hamm – vocals, bass guitar
- Bob Harris – background vocals
- Joe Kearney – background vocals
- Alex Acerra – background vocals
- Larry Crane – piccolo xylophone, bell lyre, vibraphone
- Robin DiMaggio – drums
- Chris Frazier – drums
- Deen Castronovo – drums
- Pete Zeldman – percussion
- Suzannah Harris – background vocals
- Larry Kutcher – vocals and narration on "Little Pieces of Seaweed"

=== Technical contributions ===
- Eddy Schreyer – mastering
- Lill Vai – sound effects
- Joe Despagni – sound effects
