= Live at the Astoria, London =

Video by Steve Vai
- Released: December 9, 2003
- Recorded: December 6 & 7, 2001
- Genre: Rock
- Label: Favored Nations
- Producer: Steve Vai

Steve Vai chronology
G3: Live in Concert (2000)	Live at the Astoria, London (2003)	G3: Live in Denver (2004)

Professional ratings
Review scores
Source	Rating
Allmusic	link

Live in London

Live album by Steve Vai
- Released: June 20, 2004
- Recorded: December 6 & 7, 2001
- Genre: Instrumental rock Rock
- Length: 69 minutes
- Label: Epic Records
- Producer: Steve Vai

Steve Vai chronology
G3: Rockin' in the Free World (2004)	Live in London (2004)	G3: Live in Tokyo (2005)

Live at the Astoria, London is Steve Vai's first live solo DVD, filmed at the Astoria in London on December 6 and 7, 2001. It contains a feature-length audio commentary from Vai and the band.

== DVD ==
=== DVD n.1 ===
1. Shyboy
2. Giant Balls Of Gold
3. Erotic Nightmares
4. Blood And Glory
5. Dave's Party Piece
6. Blue Powder
7. The Crying Machine
8. The Animal
9. Bangkok
10. Tony's Solo
11. Bad Horsie
12. Chameleon
13. Down Deep Into The Pain
14. Fire
15. Little Wing
16. Whispering A Prayer
17. Incantation (with drum solo)
18. Jibboom
19. For The Love Of God
20. Liberty
21. The Attitude Song

=== DVD n.2 (bonus features) ===
- Backstage
- Behind-The-Scene Footage
- Interviews
- Band Biographies
- Vai Discography
- Los Angeles Rehearsals

== CD ==
Available only online, Steve Vai - Live In London features 12 tracks that Vai personally selected from the recording of his show at the Astoria in London in 2001. The audio contained on this disc is the same audio contained on the DVD.

1. Shyboy - 4:08
2. Erotic Nightmares - 4:19
3. The Crying Machine - 4:33
4. Blue Powder - 6:56
5. The Animal - 6:54
6. Bad Horsie - 8:09
7. Down Deep Into The Pain - 3:18
8. Fire - 6:03
9. Little Wing - 4:43
10. Jibboom - 6:29
11. Liberty - 2:05
12. The Attitude Song - 11:33

== Personnel ==
- Steve Vai : Guitar & Vocals
- Billy Sheehan : Bass & Vocals
- Tony MacAlpine : Guitar & Keyboards
- Virgil Donati : Drums
- Dave Weiner : Guitar
- Eric Sardinas : Guitar ("The Attitude Song")
