= Alien Love Secrets =

EP by Steve Vai
- Released: March 21, 1995
- Recorded: The Mothership Studio in Hollywood Hills
- Genre: Instrumental rock
- Length: 33:26
- Label: Relativity
- Producer: Steve Vai

Steve Vai chronology
Sex & Religion (1993)	Alien Love Secrets (1995)	Fire Garden (1996)

Alien Love Secrets is an EP by guitarist Steve Vai, released on March 21, 1995, through Relativity Records. The EP reached No. 125 on the U.S. Billboard 200 and remained on that chart for two weeks, as well as reaching No. 72 on the Dutch albums chart.

== Overview ==
Alien Love Secrets was written and recorded in less than six weeks as a stripped-down guitar, bass and drums record with minimal keyboards, similar to how Vai recorded his 1984 debut album, Flex-Able. According to Vai, he had wished to maintain a steady output of material following his 1993 album Sex & Religion, but the recording process for the 70+ minutes of his subsequent 1996 album Fire Garden was taking too long. The EP was therefore purposely released in anticipation of Fire Garden. Stylistically Alien Love Secrets marks a return to the more familiar instrumental rock of Vai's 1990 album Passion and Warfare, following the highly mixed reception to Sex & Religion.

The name is similar to Martian Love Secrets, the working title for the 1979 live album, Sheik Yerbouti by Frank Zappa, who Vai played with in the early 1980s. Whether this was intentional or not is unconfirmed.

Notable tracks include "Bad Horsie", which was derived from a riff played by Vai during the final scenes of the 1986 film Crossroads; "Juice" was featured on the soundtrack of the 1996 PlayStation video game Formula 1; "Ya-Yo Gakk" is a call and response interplay with vocal recordings of Vai's young son Julian; "Tender Surrender", one of Vai's most popular songs, bases itself around a familiar sound, structure and tempo as Jimi Hendrix's "Villanova Junction" from his 1969 performance at Woodstock, although written in a different key; and "The Boy from Seattle", which is a tribute to Hendrix written by Vai.

== Critical reception ==
Professional ratings
Review scores
Source	Rating
AllMusic	3/5 stars

Stephen Thomas Erlewine at AllMusic gave Alien Love Secrets three stars out of five, calling it a "moodier, more atmospheric collection" than Passion and Warfare. He also praised his "fluid technique, which manages to never become completely mechanical."

== Track listing ==
All music is composed by Steve Vai.

No.	Title	Length
1.	"Bad Horsie"	5:51
2.	"Juice"	3:44
3.	"Die to Live"	3:53
4.	"The Boy from Seattle"	5:03
5.	"Ya-Yo Gakk"	2:52
6.	"Kill the Guy with the Ball": "b] The God Eaters"	7:02
7.	"Tender Surrender"	5:01
Total length:		33:26

== Personnel ==
- Steve Vai – guitar, keyboard, Eventide H3000 harmonizer, drum programming, bass, engineering, production
- Tommy Mars – organ (track 7)
- Deen Castronovo – drums (tracks 3, 4, 6, 7)
- Julian Vai – baby vocals (track 5)
- Sergio Buss – engineering assistance
- Bernie Grundman – mastering
- Pam Daney – production assistance

== Chart performance ==
Year	Chart	Position
1995	Dutch albums chart	72
1995	Billboard 200	125
