= The Ultra Zone =

Studio album by Steve Vai
- Released: September 7, 1999
- Recorded: 1998–1999
- Studio: The Mothership (Los Angeles)
- Genre: Instrumental rock, progressive rock
- Length: 68:45
- Label: Epic
- Producer: Steve Vai

Steve Vai chronology
Flex-Able Leftovers (Album) (1996)	The Ultra Zone (1999)	Real Illusions: Reflections (2005)

Professional ratings
Review scores
Source	Rating
Allmusic link	4/5 stars

The Ultra Zone is the sixth studio album by the American guitarist Steve Vai, released on September 7, 1999, through Epic Records.

The Ultra Zone is structurally similar to Vai's previous album, Fire Garden, in that the first half of the album consists mainly of instrumentals, and the second half mainly of vocal songs; however, unlike Fire Garden, The Ultra Zone is not formally divided into two "phases".

== Background ==
The Ultra Zone is notable for its tributes to two guitarists: Frank Zappa (on the track "Frank"), and Stevie Ray Vaughan (on the track "Jibboom").

This was Vai's last studio album of original material until 2005's Real Illusions: Reflections; in the years in between, he released several compilations and live albums.

Koshi Inaba and Tak Matsumoto of the Japanese rock duo B'z are featured on "Asian Sky".

== Track listing ==
All tracks are written by Steve Vai.

No.	Title	Length
1.	"The Blood & Tears" (Instrumental)	4:26
2.	"The Ultra Zone" (Instrumental)	4:52
3.	"Oooo"	5:12
4.	"Frank" (Instrumental; homage to Frank Zappa)	5:09
5.	"Jibboom" (Instrumental; homage to Stevie Ray Vaughan)	3:46
6.	"Voodoo Acid"	6:25
7.	"Windows to the Soul" (Instrumental, with some small spoken parts)	6:25
8.	"The Silent Within"	5:00
9.	"I'll Be Around"	4:57
10.	"Lucky Charms" (Instrumental)	6:44
11.	"Fever Dream" (Instrumental)	6:03
12.	"Here I Am"	4:12
13.	"Asian Sky" (featuring B'z)	5:34
Total length:		68:45

Japanese edition bonus track
No.	Title	Length
14.	"Selfless Love"	3:27
Total length:		72:12

== Personnel ==
- Steve Vai – everything (tracks 1, 2, 3, 6, 8 & 9), everything else (track 7, 10, 11 & 13), guitars (tracks 4, 5 & 12), vocals (track 12)
- Koshi Inaba – vocals (track 13)
- Tak Matsumoto – guitar (track 13)
- Mike Keneally – keyboards (track 7)
- John Sergio – bass (track 4)
- Philip Bynoe – bass (tracks 5,7 & 12)
- Bryan Beller – bass (tracks 10 & 11)
- Gregg Bissonette – drums (track 4)
- Mike Mangini – drums (tracks 5, 7 & 12)
- Robin DiMaggio – drums (track 10)
- Andy Cleaves – trumpet (track 10)
- Duane Benjamin – trombone (track 10)
- Niels Bye Nielsen – orchestration (track 10)
