= Flex-Able Leftovers =

EP by Steve Vai
- Released: 1984
- Recorded: 1982–1984
- Genre: Instrumental rock
- Length: 32:25
- Label: Urantia Records/Akashic Records
- Producer: Steve Vai

Steve Vai chronology
Flex-Able (1984)	Flex-Able Leftovers (1984)	Passion and Warfare (1990)

Alternative cover

Flex-Able Leftovers is a limited edition 10" vinyl EP by American composer and guitarist, Steve Vai. It was leftover material from the recordings done during the Flex-Able days (1982 to 1984) and originally released in 1984 (see 1984 in music). In this regard, it can be perceived as a supplement to the initial release of "Flex-Able". As in the case of the main album, "Flex-Able Leftovers" boast of a Zappa-based stylistic and musical influence.

== Background ==
There were only two EP editions in 1984:

- The first issue (limited to 1,000 copies) on Urantia Records.
- The second issue, with a different cover artwork/design (limited to 1,000 copies) on Akashic Records.

Subsequently, the EP was re-released as a studio album with more tracks in November 1998.

== Track listing ==
All songs written by Steve Vai, except where noted.

In Side

1. "You Didn't Break It" (Bob Harris, Suzannah Harris) – 4:14
2. "Bledsoe Bluvd" – 4:22
3. "The Beast of Love" (Joe Kearney) – 3:29
4. "Burnin' Down the Mountain" – 4:22

Out Side

1. "So Happy" (Vai, Laurel Fishman) – 2:43
2. "Details at 10" – 5:57
3. "Little Pieces of Seaweed" (Vai, Larry Kutcher) – 5:12
4. "Chronic Insomnia" – 2:00

== Credits ==
=== Personnel ===
- Steve Vai – vocals, acoustic and electric guitars, coral sitar, keyboards, electric piano, bass guitar, background vocals
- Scott Collard – Synthesizer (Prophet V)
- Larry Crane – piccolo xylophone, bell lyre, vibraphone
- Fammin – vocals (screaming)
- Laurel Fishman – vocals
- Chris Frazier – drums
- Joe Kearney – vocals
- Larry Kutcher – vocals (narration) and lyrics (for Little Pieces Of Seaweed)
- Stu Hamm – vocals, bass guitar
- Suzannah Harris – background vocals
- Bob Harris – vocals programmed by drums
- Tommy Mars – vocals, violin, keyboards
- Lillian Vai – vocals (crying)
- Chad Wackerman – drums
- Pete Zeldman – percussion

=== Technical contributions ===
- Steve Vai – producer, engineer, mixing, cover artwork/cover design
- John Matousek – mastering
- Mark Pinske – mastering (assistant)
