= Flex-Able =

Studio album by Steve Vai
- Released: January 1984
- Recorded: April–November, 1983
- Genres: Progressive rock; instrumental rock; avant-garde metal
- Length: 41:18 (without the bonus tracks); 55:04 (with the bonus tracks)
- Labels: Urantia Records (original); Akashic Records (1988 reissue); Epic Records (1997 reissue)
- Producer: Steve Vai

Steve Vai chronology
Flex-Able (1984)	Flex-Able Leftovers (1984)

Alternative cover
- 1988 reissue with bonus tracks

Professional ratings
Review scores
Source	Rating
Allmusic	4.5/5 stars
Classic Rock	3.5/5 stars

Flex-Able is the debut studio album by American virtuoso guitarist Steve Vai. This was his first as a solo artist, and was created in Stucco Blue, a shed converted into a studio in Vai's old back garden. It is very different from many of his other albums, and is largely influenced by Frank Zappa; Vai was a member of his backing band from 1980 to 1983. Flex-Able does not rely as much on massive guitar arrangements and shred moments as the rest of his output from the 1990s onwards, with the exception of Leftovers which is a compilation of bonus tracks and remasters from his sessions at Stucco Blue.

The cover of the May 2009 issue of Guitar World features a photograph of Vai in a pose similar to the album's cover, including the bending guitar neck.

== Track listing (Original LP release) ==
The album was originally released on vinyl in 1984.

All songs written by Steve Vai.

=== Side one ===
1. "Little Green Men" – 5:39
2. "Viv Woman" – 3:09
3. "Lovers Are Crazy" – 5:39
4. "Salamanders in the Sun" – 2:26
5. "The Boy/Girl Song" – 4:02

=== Side two ===
1. "The Attitude Song" – 3:23
2. "Call It Sleep" – 5:09
3. "Junkie" – 7:23
4. "Bill's Private Parts" – 0:16
5. "Next Stop Earth" – 0:34
6. "There's Something Dead in Here" – 3:46

== Track listing (extended edition re-release) ==
The album was re-released on CD in 1988 by Akashic Records, with four bonus tracks from the Flex-Able Leftovers EP; and again remastered and reissued by Epic Records in 1997, with the same track listing as the Akashic reissue. There is also one European reissue on Curcio Records (released in 1992 in Italy) that features the same cover on the vinyl and just the first eleven tracks.

All songs written by Steve Vai unless otherwise indicated.

1. "Little Green Men" – 5:39
2. "Viv Woman" – 3:09
3. "Lovers Are Crazy" – 5:39
4. "Salamanders in the Sun" – 2:26
5. "The Boy/Girl Song" – 4:02
6. "The Attitude Song" – 3:23
7. "Call It Sleep" – 5:09
8. "Junkie" – 7:23
9. "Bill's Private Parts" – 0:16
10. "Next Stop Earth" – 0:34
11. "There's Something Dead in Here" – 3:46

Bonus From Flex-Able Leftovers EP

12. "So Happy" (Steve Vai, Laurel Fishman) – 2:44
13. "Bledsoe Bluvd" – 4:22
14. "Burnin' Down the Mountain" – 4:22
15. "Chronic Insomnia" – 2:05

== Trivia ==
The first song on the album, "Little Green Men", is dedicated to Nina Hagen.

== Personnel ==
- Steve Vai – electric guitar, acoustic guitar, synthesizer, bass, percussion, piano, keyboards, sitar, vocals, bells, producer, engineer, drum machine, drum programming, design, and mixing

Additional Musicians

- Scott Collard – synthesizer, keyboards, Fender Rhodes
- Larry Crane – lyre, xylophone, bells, vibraphone
- Greg Degler – clarinet, flute, saxophone
- Joe Despagni – sound effects
- Laurel Fishman – vocals
- Peggy Foster – bass
- Chris Frazier – drums
- Stuart Hamm – bass, sound effects, vocals, vocals (background)
- Bob Harris – trumpet, vocals (as Irney Rantin)
- Suzannah Harris (as Ursula Rayven) – vocals
- Billy James – percussion, drums
- Paul Lemcke – keyboards
- Pia Maiocco – vocals
- Tommy Mars – violin, keyboards, vocals
- Lill Vai – sound effects
- Chad Wackerman – drums
- Pete Zeldman – percussion, drums

Production

- Aaron Brown – design, illustrations
- John Matousek – mastering
- Mark Pinske – assistant
- Neil Zlozower – photography
