= Sex & Religion =

Studio album by Vai
- Released: July 27, 1993
- Studio: The Mothership (Hollywood Hills, California)
- Genre: Heavy metal; hard rock; instrumental rock
- Length: 59:18
- Label: Relativity
- Producer: Steve Vai

Steve Vai chronology
Passion and Warfare (1990)	Sex & Religion (1993)	Alien Love Secrets (1995)

Devin Townsend chronology
Sex & Religion (1993)	Heavy as a Really Heavy Thing (1995)

Singles from Sex & Religion
- 1. "In My Dreams with You" Released: 1993; 2. "Down Deep into the Pain" Released: 1993

Sex & Religion is the third solo studio album by American guitarist Steve Vai, released under the band name "Vai" on July 27, 1993, through Relativity Records. It is known as the first major appearance of Devin Townsend, who performed vocals for the album and went on to fame with Devin Townsend Project and Strapping Young Lad. Townsend also co-wrote the tracks "Pig" and "Just Cartilage", the latter of which was only released as a bonus track in Japan. Vai also co-wrote "In My Dreams with You" with Desmond Child and Roger Greenawalt.

Sex & Religion reached No. 48 on the U.S. Billboard 200, No. 17 in the UK albums chart and also charted within the top 60 in four other countries. "In My Dreams with You" was released as a single, reaching No. 36 on Billboard's Mainstream Rock chart.

The album's cover art appears to be a reference to the famous artistic depictions of Saint Sebastian.

== Background and conflict ==
For Sex & Religion, Vai wished to put together a band of "monster musicians" which included himself, Townsend, drummer and fellow Frank Zappa alumnus Terry Bozzio, and bassist T. M. Stevens. It was originally intended for each musician to contribute ideas and play a large role in the creative process, but Vai ended up micro-managing the whole project, which caused much conflict during the making of the album. As Vai explains, there was heavy expectation to make another album in the style of Passion and Warfare (1990), but he instead made the decision to go in a radically different direction, therefore confounding many fans and critics. The band split up after the album was finished, and Vai subsequently toured only with Townsend and several session drummers and bassists (including Abe Laboriel Jr., Toss Panos, and Scott Thunes).

== Critical reception ==
Professional ratings
Review scores
Source	Rating
AllMusic	2/5 stars

Stephen Thomas Erlewine at AllMusic gave Sex & Religion two stars out of five, calling it "the most predictable and conventional—not to mention boring—[album] of Vai's usually remarkable career" and criticizing the band as being "pedestrian".

== Track listing ==
All tracks are written by Steve Vai, except where noted.

No.	Title	Length
1.	"An Earth Dweller's Return"	1:04
2.	"Here & Now"	4:47
3.	"In My Dreams with You" (Vai, Desmond Child, Roger Greenawalt)	5:01
4.	"Still My Bleeding Heart"	6:00
5.	"Sex & Religion"	4:24
6.	"Dirty Black Hole"	4:27
7.	"Touching Tongues"	5:33
8.	"State of Grace"	1:41
9.	"Survive"	4:46
10.	"Pig" (Vai, Devin Townsend)	3:36
11.	"The Road to Mt. Calvary"	2:35
12.	"Down Deep into the Pain"	8:01
13.	"Rescue Me or Bury Me"	8:25
Total length:		60:25

Japanese edition bonus track
No.	Title	Length
14.	"Just Cartilage" (Vai, Townsend)	4:19

== Personnel ==
- Steve Vai – guitar, vocals, arrangements, engineering, production
- Devin Townsend – lead vocals
- Terry Bozzio – drums
- T. M. Stevens – bass
- Kane Roberts – background vocals
- Bernie Grundman – mastering

== Charts ==
=== Weekly charts ===
Chart performance for Sex & Religion
Chart (1993)	Peak position
Australian Albums (ARIA)	67
Dutch Albums (Album Top 100)	26
European Albums (IFPI)	22
Finnish Albums (Suomen virallinen lista)	14
German Albums (Offizielle Top 100)	53
Icelandic Albums (Tónlist)	10
Spanish Albums (AFYVE)	34
Swedish Albums (Sverigetopplistan)	41
Swiss Albums (Schweizer Hitparade)	26
UK Albums (OCC)	17
US Billboard 200	48
