= Chris Frazier =

American drummer

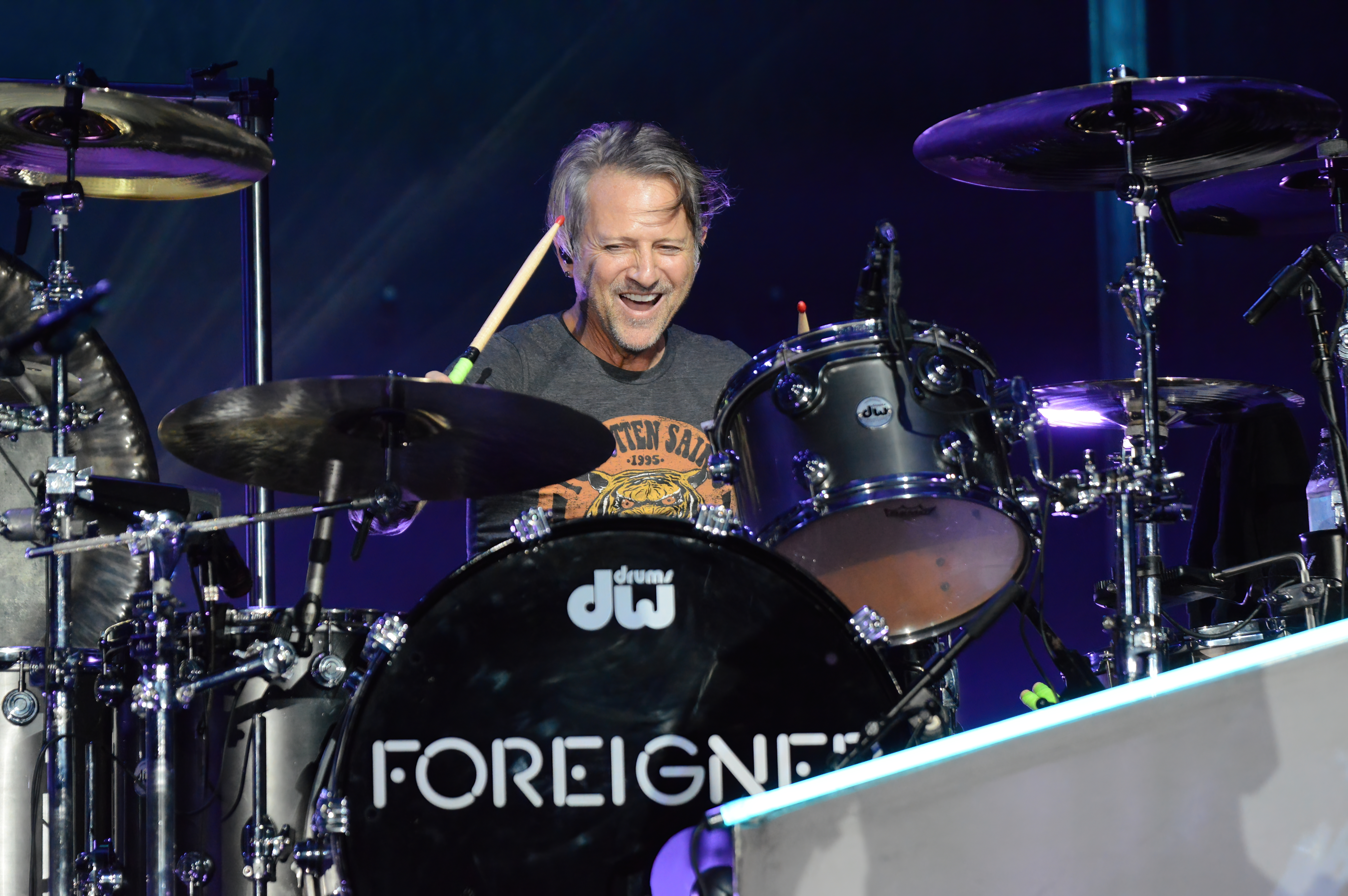
- Frazier performing with Foreigner in 2022

Background information
- Born: September 7, 1967 (age 58); Bethesda, Maryland, U.S.
- Genres: Hard rock, heavy metal, instrumental rock, progressive metal
- Occupation: Drummer

Chris Frazier (born September 7, 1967) is an American drummer. He is known in the professional ranks since he started recording and touring with guitarist Steve Vai from 1995 through 2001. Frazier was the touring drummer with classic rock singer Eddie Money from 2003 through 2006, when he was approached to become the drummer of veteran rock band Whitesnake.

Frazier was called up by David Coverdale in May 2006, Coverdale took an instant liking to him. Frazier had done work extensive with Whitesnake's guitar player, Doug Aldrich in the past. Frazier was with Whitesnake through December 2010 and appeared on their 2008 album Good to Be Bad and toured with Whitesnake in support of the album.

Before Whitesnake, Frazier worked with Eddie Money (2003–2006), Edgar Winter and TMG (Tak Matsumoto Group), which featured Jack Blades and Eric Martin as well. Chris had worked with Whitesnake guitarist Doug Aldrich on his solo albums, and with guitarist Steve Vai.

Frazier is currently the drummer for the rock band Foreigner, having joined in September 2012.
