= Passion and Warfare =

Studio album by Steve Vai
- Released: May 22, 1990
- Studio: The Mothership
- Genres: Instrumental rock; hard rock; progressive metal
- Length: 53:15
- Label: Relativity
- Producer: Steve Vai

Steve Vai chronology
Flex-Able Leftovers (1984)	Passion and Warfare (1990)	Sex & Religion (1993)

Professional ratings
Review scores
Source	Rating
AllMusic	4.5/5 stars

Passion and Warfare is the second studio album by American guitarist Steve Vai, released on May 22, 1990, through Relativity and Epic Records. It has been certified Gold by the RIAA.

== Background ==
Passion and Warfare was inspired by dreams that Vai had when he was younger. In the sheet music book of the album, Vai describes the album as "Jimi Hendrix meets Jesus Christ at a party that Ben Hur threw for Mel Blanc". It was recorded at Vai's home studio, The Mothership, a 1,600-square-foot (150 m^{2}) building in which his guitar parts for Whitesnake's 1989 album Slip of the Tongue were also recorded. Whitesnake members David Coverdale, Adrian Vandenberg and Rudy Sarzo are credited with backing vocals, and Coverdale also contributes spoken vocals. According to Vai, planning for the album started as early as 1982, but was shelved after joining David Lee Roth's band and not picked up again until parting ways with Roth in 1989.

The music video for "The Audience Is Listening" received regular airplay on MTV.

=== Recording methods ===
Vai utilized many unusual recording techniques on the album. For what would come to be one of his most popular songs to date, "For the Love of God", he fasted for ten days and recorded the song on the fourth day of the fast. "Blue Powder" was originally recorded in 1986 as a showcase track for Carvin, using their X-100B amplifier, and given away with Guitar Player magazine in flexi disc format. Vai was introduced to Carvin by his mentor Frank Zappa, who had also used the X-100B. The drums were subsequently re-recorded for the album. The equipment used to record Passion and Warfare was: Ibanez JEM and Universe guitars; Charvel Green Meanie guitar; Marshall JCM900 and Carvin X-100B amplifiers; ADA MP-1 preamplifier; Boss DS-1 distortion pedal; Eventide H3000 Harmonizer; Lexicon 480L. Like many other releases by Vai, the album is largely instrumental, with only spoken word pieces being featured in terms of vocals, which are performed by many guests.

=== Legacy ===
The song "For the Love of God" is available for download for the 2007 video game Guitar Hero III: Legends of Rock, and was voted the 29th best solo of all time by a readers' poll in Guitar World magazine.

In 2016, Vai embarked on the Passion and Warfare 25th Anniversary World Tour, where he played the album in its entirety for the first time.

== Track listing ==
All tracks are written by Steve Vai.

No.	Title	Length
1.	"Liberty"	2:03
2.	"Erotic Nightmares"	4:15
3.	"The Animal"	4:01
4.	"Answers"	2:56
5.	"The Riddle"	6:24
6.	"Ballerina 12/24"	1:43
7.	"For the Love of God"	6:03
8.	"The Audience Is Listening"	5:30
9.	"I Would Love To"	3:41
10.	"Blue Powder"	4:44
11.	"Greasy Kid's Stuff"	2:58
12.	"Alien Water Kiss"	1:10
13.	"Sisters"	4:07
14.	"Love Secrets"	3:40
Total length:		53:15

25th Anniversary Edition bonus tracks
No.	Title	Length
15.	"Lovely Elixir"	3:30
16.	"And We Are One (Solo #2)"	2:03
17.	"As Above"	2:15
18.	"So Below"	2:14

== Personnel ==
- Steve Vai – guitar, Eventide H3000, keyboard (tracks 1, 3, 5, 7, 11), bass (tracks 1, 8, 9, 11), arrangement, engineering, production
- David Rosenthal – keyboard (tracks 2, 9, 13), background vocals
- Pia Maiocco (credited as Pia Vai) – keyboard on one chord (track 4)
- Bob Harris – keyboard (track 10), background vocals
- Chris Frazier – drums (tracks 1–5, 8, 10, 11, 13)
- Tris Imboden – drums (tracks 7, 9)
- Stuart Hamm – bass (tracks 2–5, 7, 10, 13)
- Nancy Fagen – "vocals & hysteria" (track 8)
- Jamie Firlotte – boy vocals (track 8)
- David Coverdale – background vocals
- Rudy Sarzo – background vocals
- Adrian Vandenberg – background vocals
- Pascal Fillet – background vocals
- Laurel Fishman – background vocals
- Lillian Vai – background vocals
- Pam Vai – background vocals
- Joel Kaith – background vocals
- Corky Tanassy – background vocals
- Jamie Kornberg – background vocals
- Lauren Kornberg – background vocals
- Corinne Larue – background vocals
- Famin' – background vocals
- Darla Albright – background vocals
- Laura Gross – background vocals
- Rupert Henry – background vocals
- Suzanna Harris – background vocals
- Julian Angel Vai – background vocals
- Pascal Fillet – mixing
- Bernie Grundman – mastering

== Charts ==
=== Weekly charts ===
Chart performance for Passion and Warfare
Chart (1990)	Peak position
Australian Albums (ARIA)	25
Canadian Albums (RPM)	27
Dutch Albums (Album Top 100)	32
European Albums (IFPI)	36
Finnish Albums (Suomen virallinen lista)	3
Japanese Albums (Oricon)	28
New Zealand Albums (RMNZ)	12
Spanish Albums (AFYVE)	42
Swedish Albums (Sverigetopplistan)	27
Swiss Albums (Schweizer Hitparade)	35
UK Albums (Official Charts)	8
US Billboard 200	18
US Top Album Sales (Billboard)	18

== Certifications ==
Certifications for Passion and Warfare
Region	Certification	Certified units/sales
Australia (ARIA)	Gold	35,000^{^}
Canada (Music Canada)	Gold	50,000^{^}
Japan (RIAJ)	Gold	132,500
New Zealand (RMNZ)	Gold	7,500^{^}
United Kingdom (BPI)	Silver	50,000
United States (RIAA)	Gold	850,000
^{^} Shipments figures based on certification alone.
