= Steve Vai =

American guitarist (born 1960)

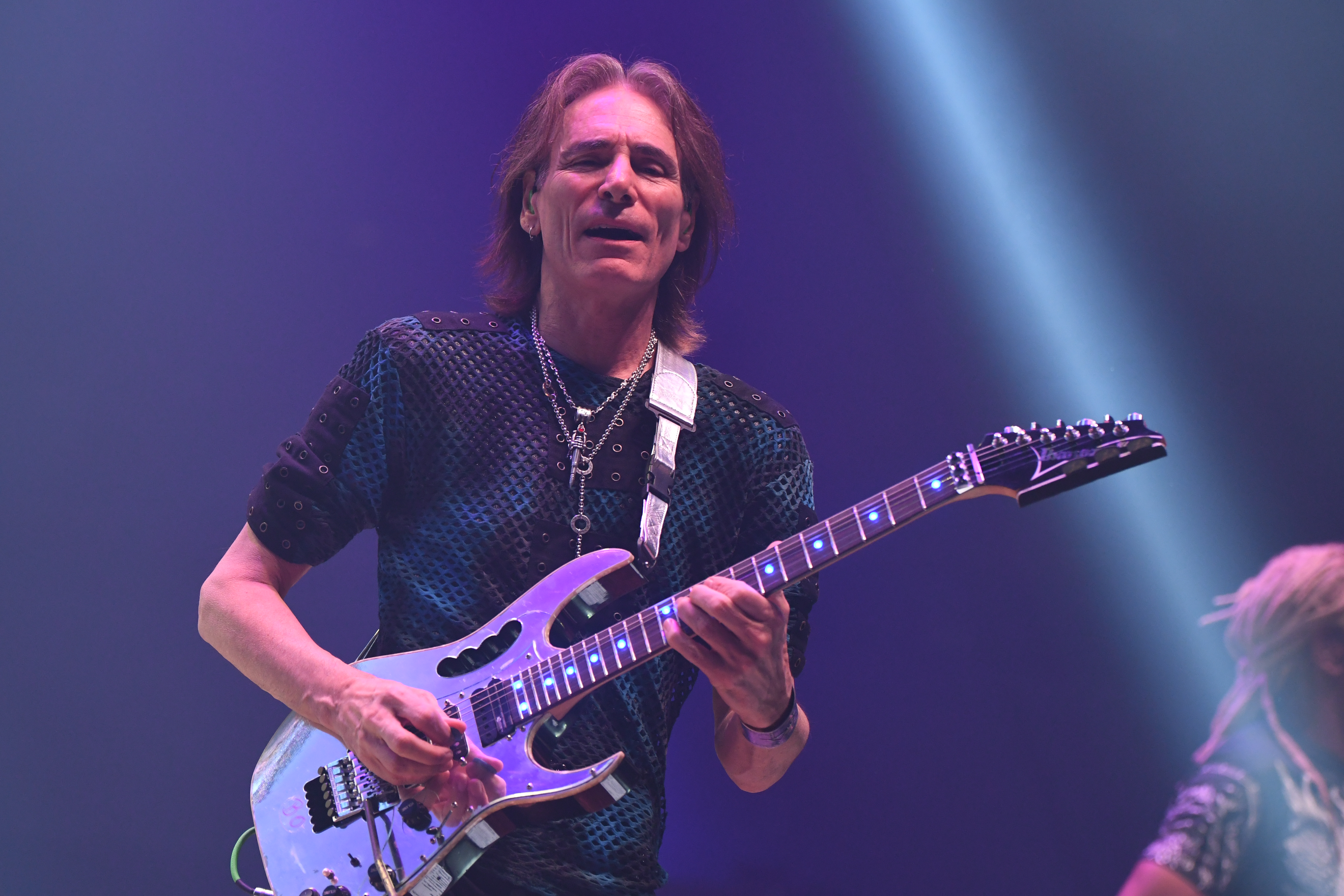
- Vai performing in Wrocław in 2023

Background information
- Born: Steven Siro Vai; June 6, 1960 (age 66); Carle Place, New York, U.S.
- Genres: Instrumental rock; hard rock; heavy metal; progressive metal
- Occupations: Musician; songwriter; producer
- Instruments: Guitar; bass; vocals
- Works: Discography
- Years active: 1978–present
- Labels: Favored Nations; Relativity; Epic; Mascot
- Member of: Beat; SATCHVAI
- Formerly of: Frank Zappa; Alcatrazz; David Lee Roth; Whitesnake
- Website: vai.com

Steven Siro Vai (/vaɪ/ VYE; born June 6, 1960) is an American guitarist, songwriter, and producer. A three-time Grammy Award winner and fifteen-time nominee, Vai started his music career in 1978 at the age of eighteen as a transcriptionist for Frank Zappa, and played in Zappa's band from 1980 to 1983. He embarked on a solo career in 1983 and has released 11 solo albums to date. He has recorded and toured with Alcatrazz, David Lee Roth, and Whitesnake, as well as recording with artists such as Ozzy Osbourne, Public Image Ltd, Mary J. Blige, Spinal Tap, Alice Cooper, Motörhead, and Polyphia. Additionally, Vai has toured with live-only acts G3, Zappa Plays Zappa, Beat (playing 1980s era King Crimson) and the Experience Hendrix Tour, as well as headlining international tours.

Vai has been described as a "highly individualistic player" and part of a generation of "heavy rock and metal virtuosi who came to the fore in the 1980s". He released his first solo album Flex-Able in 1984, while his most successful release, Passion and Warfare (1990), was described as "the richest and best hard rock guitar-virtuoso album of the '80s". He was voted the "10th Greatest Guitarist" by Guitar World magazine's readers, and has sold over 15 million records.

== Biography ==
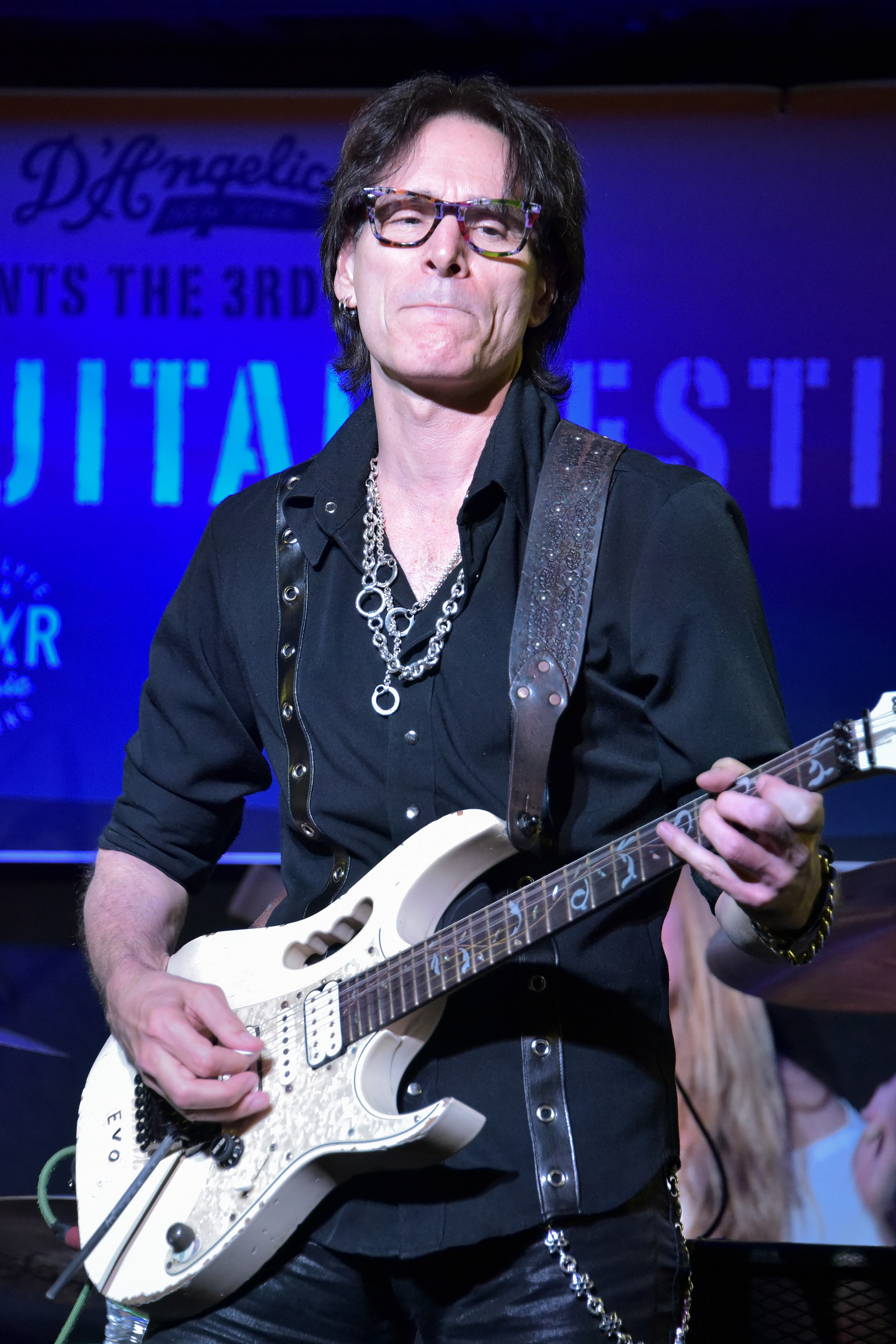
Steve Vai in 2017

=== Early life ===
Steve Vai, a descendant of Italian immigrants, was born in Carle Place, New York on June 6, 1960. He is the fourth son of John and Theresa Vai. Vai was raised Roman Catholic. He described his first experiences with music as, "at the age of five I walked up to [a] piano, hit a note, and noticed that to the right the notes go higher and to the left the notes go lower. In that very moment, I had a full-on epiphany. I was flooded with the instinctual realization of how music was created and how it worked from a theoretical standpoint—the whole language of music was very obvious. I also understood immediately, instinctually, and unequivocally something that has only deepened through the years: that the creation of music is an infinite personal expression. I realized that I could do this, I could make music, and it could be whatever I want."

It was a year later, at the age of six, that Vai experienced his introduction to the guitar, remembering that, "I saw this nine-year-old boy playing the guitar in my grade school auditorium, and that was another epiphany that I had. It was my first recognition of the instrument. When I saw that guitar and I saw this kid playing it, I knew instinctually that I was going to play the guitar someday, and that it would be my instrument. Don't ask me how I knew, I just knew. It was the coolest thing I had ever seen."

As a young child, Vai was influenced by the music his parents had listened to. The album that he cites as his "musical awakening" was the original motion picture soundtrack to the 1961 film West Side Story. At age eleven, Vai was introduced to the contemporary rock and progressive music of the era, and after hearing the guitar solo to Led Zeppelin's "Heartbreaker" at age twelve, decided to begin playing the guitar.

In 1973, Vai began to take guitar lessons from fellow New York native Joe Satriani, and played in local bands (the Ohio Express, Circus, and Rayge) throughout his high school years. His friend John Sergio gave him Joe Satriani's number so that Steve and his friend Frankie Munn could get guitar lessons. In 1978, to further pursue his interest in music composition and theory, Vai attended Berklee College of Music in Boston, Massachusetts after graduating from Carle Place High School. While at Berklee, Vai began working for Frank Zappa as a transcriptionist, and in the middle of his fourth semester, moved to California to start his career as a session and touring artist for Zappa. Also while at Berklee, Vai met his future spouse Pia Maiocco. They have been together since they met and have two children. In 2003, Vai was awarded an Honorary Doctorate of Music from Berklee.

=== Early music career (1978–1986) ===
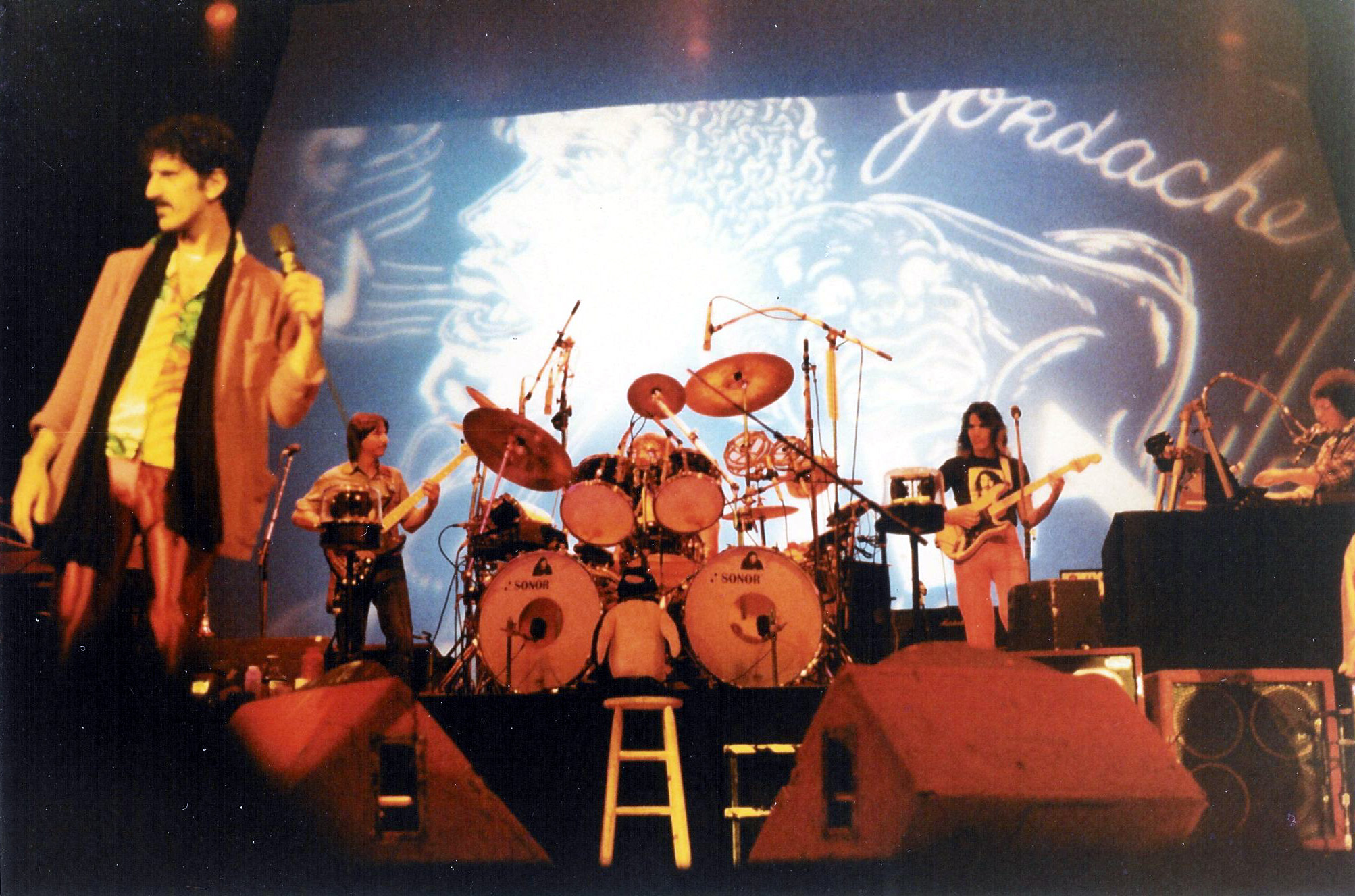
Steve Vai (on guitar in between the drums and keyboard, to the right), Frank Zappa and band during a concert at the Memorial Auditorium in Buffalo, New York (October 25, 1980)

In 1978, Vai sent both a notated transcription of Frank Zappa's "The Black Page", and a recording of his college band, Morning Thunder, to Zappa. Impressed by this, Zappa responded by putting Vai on salary to transcribe his work, which included pieces from the Joe's Garage and Shut Up 'n Play Yer Guitar albums. After leaving Berklee College of Music and moving to California, Vai auditioned for and became a full-time member of Zappa's band, going on his first tour with Zappa in late 1980. Zappa often referred to Vai as his "little Italian virtuoso", and Vai is frequently listed in the liner notes of Zappa's albums as having performed "stunt" or "impossible" guitar parts.

Vai was a featured artist on the 1993 release Zappa's Universe, and in 2006, Vai appeared as a special guest on Dweezil Zappa's Zappa Plays Zappa tour; both projects won Vai a Grammy Award.

After moving on from Zappa's employ in 1983, Vai bought a house in Sylmar, Los Angeles, where he built his first professional studio. During this period, Vai formed two bands (The Classified and 777) as well as writing and recording a large amount of music that was not originally intended for release. Out of this material, Vai compiled his first studio album Flex-Able. He created his own record label, Akashic Records (later Light Without Heat Records), which he used to take Flex-Able directly to distribution channels. Flex-Able was released in January 1984.

Vai began his rise to public acclaim in 1983 when, shortly before the release of Flex-Able, his composition "The Attitude Song" was published in Guitar Player magazine. The song centered itself on a main guitar riff in the time signature 7/16, played over a rhythm section centered in 4/4. Each following section of the song showcased a number of specialized techniques (such as two-handed tapping, whammy bar acrobatics, sweep picking, alternate picking, multi-part harmonies, and odd phrasing) used in angular and exaggerated ways that were unique to the song at the time. Interest from the public grew even greater when Vai's song "Blue Powder" (a demonstration for the Carvin X100b amplifier) was published in Guitar Player as well, which showed the virtuoso side of Vai's compositional process. Also in 1986, Vai was cast in the film Crossroads as the Devil's guitar player "Jack Butler". In the famous "duel scene" between Vai and Ralph Macchio's character, Vai wrote and performed all guitar parts with the exception of the slide guitar, which was performed by Ry Cooder.

In between solo work, Vai replaced Yngwie Malmsteen in June 1984 as the lead guitarist of Alcatrazz, with whom he recorded the album Disturbing the Peace. Vai left shortly after the subsequent tour to join David Lee Roth's band.

=== With David Lee Roth (1985–1989) ===
In 1985, Vai joined David Lee Roth's post-Van Halen band as lead guitarist, together with former Talas bassist Billy Sheehan on bass; and former Maynard Ferguson drummer Gregg Bissonette on drums. The quartet's debut album Eat 'Em and Smile, released on July 7, 1986, was both a critical and commercial success, reaching number four on the Billboard 200 albums chart and selling over two million copies. Guitar World magazine editor Brad Tolinski commented on Vai's playing at the time, saying that "Steve Vai's guitar wizardry is so profound that in earlier times he would have been burned as a witch." Retrospectively, Eat 'Em and Smile is frequently evaluated as one of the greatest rock albums of the 1980s. The group's Eat 'Em and Smile Tour began in August 1986 and continued through February 1987.

Roth's subsequent album Skyscraper, released in 1988, was produced by both Roth and Vai. Like its predecessor, the album was a commercial success, reaching number six on the Billboard 200 chart. In 1989, following the successful Skyscraper Tour, Vai departed from the band. He was replaced by Cacophony guitarist Jason Becker.

In 1985, after having joined Roth's band, Vai designed the JEM guitar, a unique instrument that incorporated a series of groundbreaking designs that have since become staples in feature throughout the guitar industry, such as the inclusion of 24 frets on a guitar with humbuckers, single-coil middle pickup and a locking tremolo system. Vai began working with Ibanez in 1986 to develop the guitar, and the first production Ibanez JEM 777 guitars were released in 1987.

=== 1990s ===
From 1985 to 1990, Vai recorded Passion and Warfare at his home studio, his second studio solo album. After leaving Roth's band in 1989, Vai bought out of his Capitol Records contract and signed on with Relativity Records for the release of Passion and Warfare, which was completed shortly after he began recording the guitar parts for Whitesnake's Slip of the Tongue album, where he replaced the injured Adrian Vandenberg.

Upon its release in November 1989, Slip of the Tongue sold over three million copies worldwide, reaching number 10 on the Billboard 200 while Vai joined the band on their thirteen-month world tour.

In May 1990, Vai released Passion and Warfare through Relativity Records, and following its release, the album had reached number 18 in the Billboard 200, selling over a million and a half copies worldwide. Passion and Warfare won Vai a number of awards such as Guitar World and Guitar Player's "Best Album" and "Best Rock Guitarist" awards. Passion and Warfare has been cited as one of the most pertinent instrumental albums released.

1990 also saw the release of the Ibanez Universe seven-string guitar co-designed by Vai in conjunction with Ibanez. Vai left Whitesnake in 1990 to pursue his own musical avenues and formed a band that included Devin Townsend on vocals, T. M. Stevens on bass, and Terry Bozzio on drums. The group released Sex & Religion on July 23, 1993, that was described as visceral in nature, combining a compositional and progressive metal rhythm section with Devin Townsend's vocal arrangements. After the following tour in support of the album, the group disbanded. Vai began working with Ozzy Osbourne in 1994, with whom he wrote and recorded the Ozzmosis album. Due to conflicts, the album was re-written and recorded with Zakk Wylde on guitar. In 1994, Vai won a Grammy award for his performance of "Sofa", from Zappa's Universe.

While recording his fourth studio album Fire Garden, Vai took time to record and release the stripped down EP Alien Love Secrets. A departure from the often highly compositional and heavily produced style of his previous projects, the seven-track EP was recorded in four weeks and released through Relativity/Epic Records on March 21, 1995. Vai cites this record as one of his favorites, saying "The recording and release of Alien Love Secrets marked another turning point in my personal evolution. I was more concerned with making the record that I wanted to make, and not worry about what some others thought I should be doing."

On September 17, 1996, Vai released Fire Garden, 19-track double album, through Epic, with the first half being primarily instrumental while the second half featured Vai on vocals. After the release of Fire Garden, Vai joined his former teacher Joe Satriani, along with guitarist Eric Johnson, for the second installment of the ongoing G3 concert tours. On each G3 tour, three guitar-centric headlining acts are chosen to perform their own sets, and then collectively jam to fan favorite songs at the end of the show. G3: Live in Concert, a video of the 1996 tour was filmed in Columbus, Ohio and released on June 3, 1997.

In 1998, Vai independently released a performance footage DVD of Alien Love Secrets. Also in 1998, Vai started the Make a Noise Foundation with his then-manager Ruta Sepetys. The goal of the foundation was to provide funding for musical education to those otherwise unable to attain it. Today, Vai often auctions items in his possession with proceeds going to the foundation.

At the close of the decade, Vai provided guitar for Joe Jackson's Symphony No. 1, released in 1999 and winner of the 2001 Grammy for Best Pop Instrumental Album.

=== 2000s ===
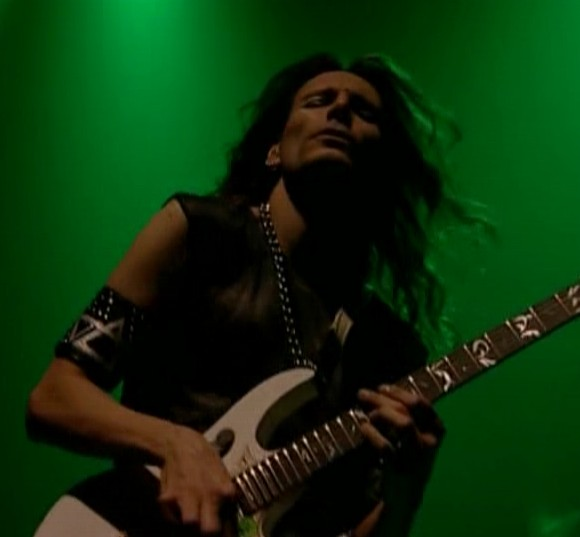
Vai performing in 2001

In December 2001, Vai recorded two performances at The Astoria in London, with his band The Breed (composed of former David Lee Roth bandmate Billy Sheehan, guitarist/pianist Tony MacAlpine, guitarist Dave Weiner, and drummer Virgil Donati). This live show was released independently in DVD format as Steve Vai: Live at the Astoria, London in 2003, and was Vai's first of many successful live concert DVD projects. In 2004, Vai released twelve tracks from the DVD in an online only release.

2001 saw the limited release of The Secret Jewel Box, a conceptual ten-CD box set containing unique material from various eras of Vai's career. Four compilation albums (The Elusive Light and Sound Vol. 1; Mystery Tracks – Archives Vol. 3; Various Artists – Archives Vol. 4; and Vai: Piano Reductions, Vol. 1) included as part of the box set, were released to the public both in 2001 and the years following. Also in 2001, Vai's record label Favored Nations released No Substitutions: Live in Osaka. The release, which Vai himself produced and engineered, won him his second Grammy award for Best Pop Instrumental Album in February 2002.

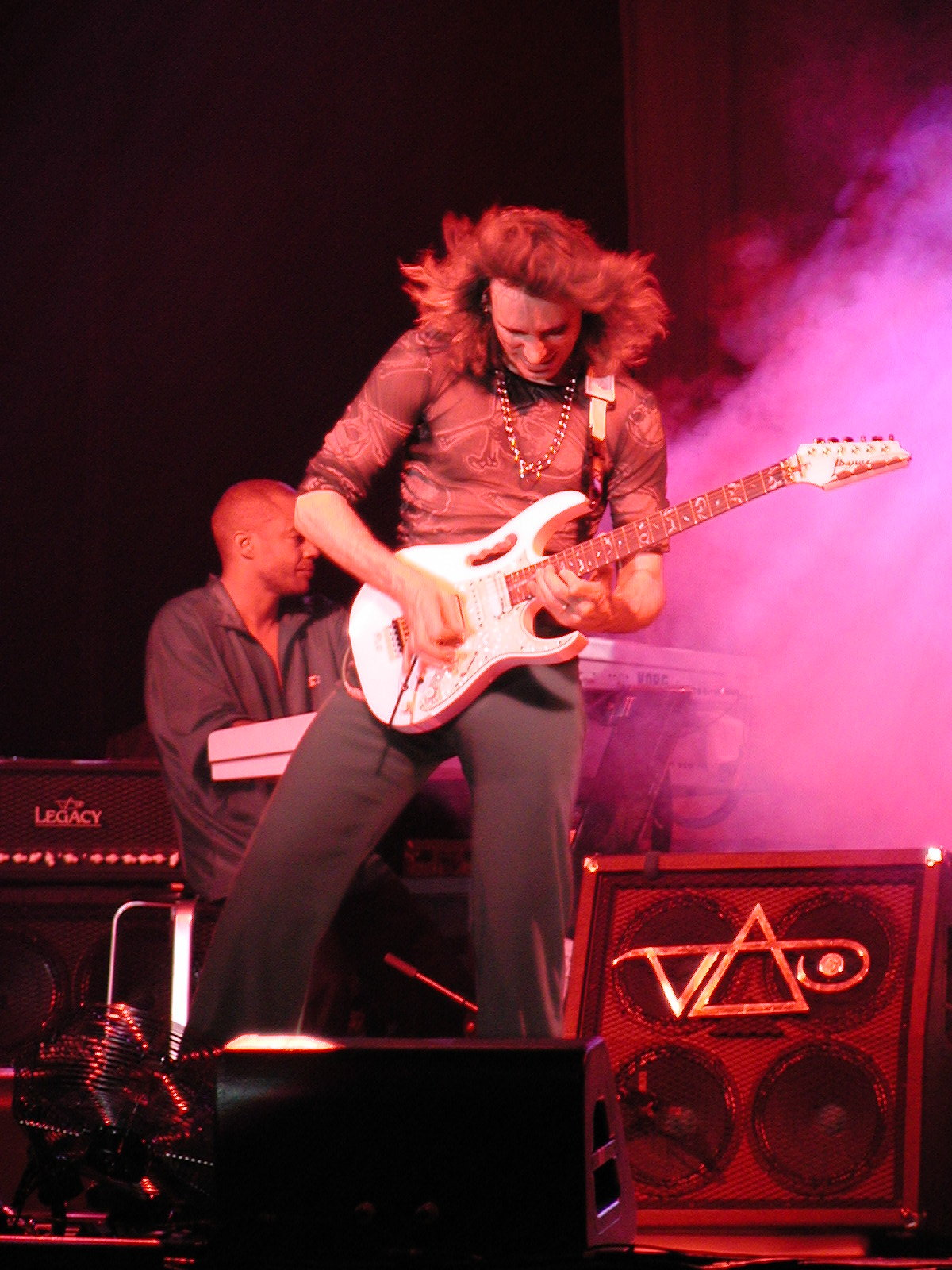
Vai performing in 2004

While most widely recognized for his stature as a rock guitar player, Vai is also a musical composer fluent in the composition and arranging of orchestral music. In May 2004, Vai premiered "The Aching Hunger", a project commissioned by the Netherlands Programme Service and performed with the Netherlands' Metropole Orchestra. "The Aching Hunger" performances consisted of two parts: the first showcasing Vai's original contemporary orchestral compositions, and the second consisting of Vai (on guitar) playing newly arranged material from his catalog with the orchestra. This project yielded both the Visual Sound Theories DVD and the Sound Theories Vol. I & II album, which were recorded in 2005 during multiple "Aching Hunger" performances and released in June 2007. While "The Aching Hunger" and its following releases started Vai's public career as an orchestral composer, Vai had been composing since he began a music theory class (taught by Bill Westcott) in high school. While reflecting on his time with Westcott, Vai said "He taught me how to write, compose and appreciate music. There was no greater musical influence in my life."

In 2005, Vai released Real Illusions: Reflections, the first installment in an ongoing three-part trilogy concept album. Each of the three installments to the series contain material (songs, lyrics, and both spoken and written narration) with particular relationships to the storyline, purposefully left out of order. Upon the release of the third installment, Vai intends to complete a fourth album of material, which will then be released with the previous three installments and completed storyline in order. In speaking of the storyline, Vai says "It's a human interest story, about the human condition. ... It's a story about this man who has a traumatic experience in his life, and it drives him insane. We see the story through his eyes. It also involves the town he lives in and this stranger that enters the town who's like a shaman; he builds this giant edifice, like a reflecting pond, and when people come to it they see aspects of their personalities and identities and discover things about themselves. There's some comedy involved, too, but it's pretty esoteric. It's about a lot of lofty principles, so it's not a bad idea to dish this all out slowly." The installments to the series will be released over periods of time, with the second, The Story of Light, having been released in 2012.

In 2006, Vai joined the Zappa Plays Zappa tour as a special guest, alongside additional Zappa band alumni Terry Bozzio and Napoleon Murphy Brock. In 2008, for his performance of "Peaches en Regalia" from the Zappa Plays Zappa tour, Vai won his third Grammy Award for Best Rock Instrumental Performance. Having always enjoyed the aspect of teaching and sharing his experiences in life and in the music business, Vai began a series of "Alien Guitar Secrets" masterclasses in 2006 - a touring masterclass in which Vai holds open forum discussion about his own experiences in the music industry, explains the key principles to understanding success, plays to backing tracks (often inviting class attendees to jam with him), answers questions, articulates key points of guitar technique, and more importantly goes beyond the technique and into the more profound esoteric principles at play (see Notable contributions for more on this).

In support of Sound Theories Vol. I & II and Visual Sound Theories, Vai put together a new band for a five-month world tour of the United States, Europe, South America, and Australia. While evaluating unique options for the band (which included ideas for a horn section or percussion section), Vai began auditioning violin players to complement the new lineup. This new band, known as the String Theories band, featured previous The Breed members Jeremy Colson (drums) and Dave Weiner (guitar and sitar), along with new members Bryan Beller (bass), Alex DePue (violin), and Ann Marie Calhoun (violin). During a month of twelve- to fifteen-hour a day rehearsals, Vai and the band perfected the performance (which consisted of pieces from Vai's catalog, arranged by Vai to include the two violins). The tour began in June 2007 and ended in December the same year.

Midway through the String Theories tour in 2007, Vai recorded a performance at the State Theatre in Minneapolis, which yielded the acclaimed 2009 live concert DVD and Blu-ray release of Where the Wild Things Are. Certified gold in the United States and Canada, Where the Wild Things Are showcased the diverse musical range of the String Theories band, with pieces such as the visceral Grammy-nominated "Now We Run", to the dynamic ballad "Angel Food".

2007 also marked the 20th anniversary of the production of the Ibanez JEM guitar, a milestone which was commemorated with the 20th anniversary JEM model. Made of an acrylic body with three-dimensional "swirl painted" interior, this guitar can be seen in the beginning of the Where the Wild Things Are DVD. In 2008, Vai announced the release of his signature Ibanez Jemini distortion pedal, a twin distortion pedal with both a custom overdrive and lead distortion section.

=== 2010s ===
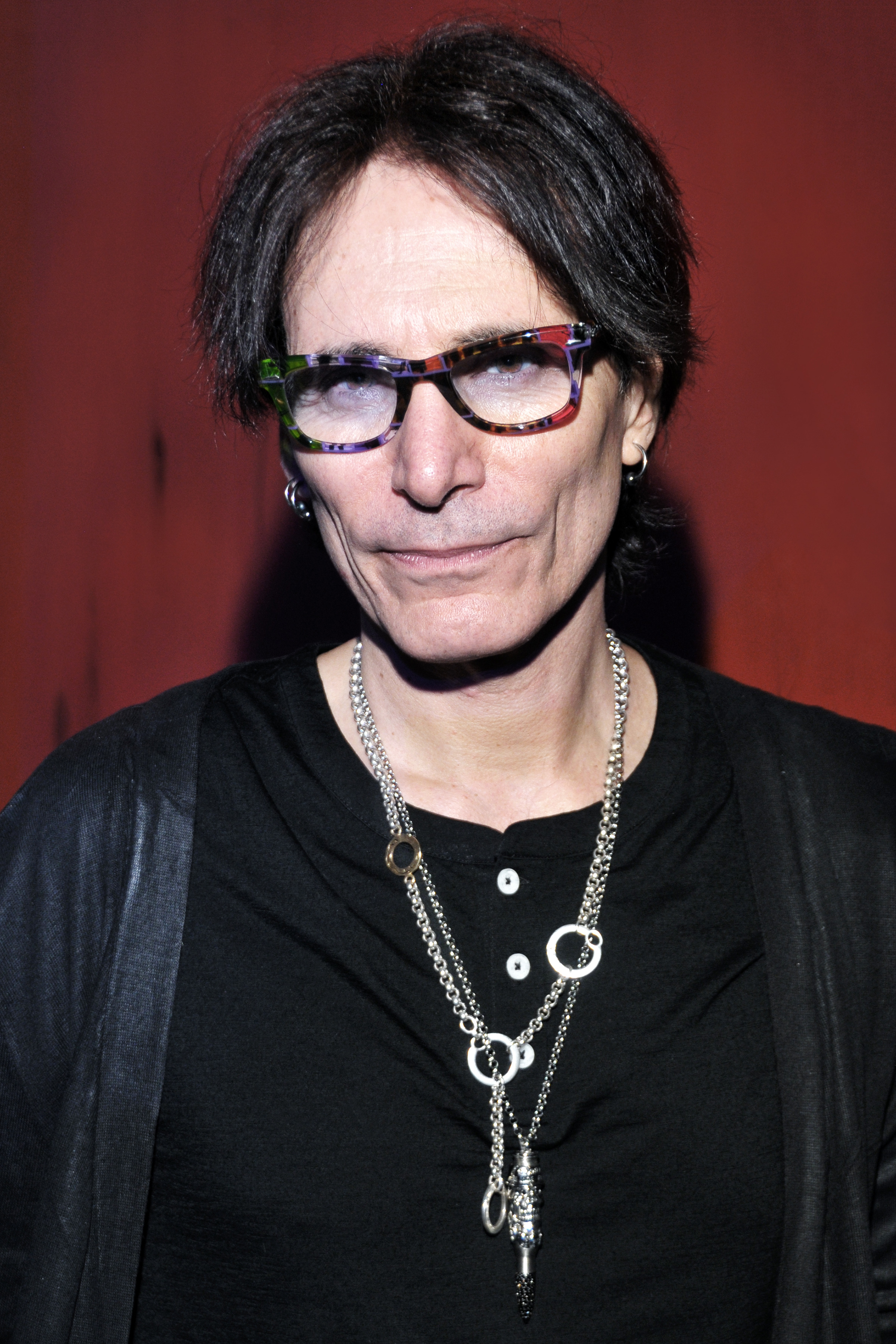
Vai in 2015

2010 marked the twentieth anniversary of the production of the Ibanez Universe guitar, which was commemorated with a twentieth anniversary Universe model. A reissue of the early 1990s Universe 77 MC (multi-color swirl), the model included a new five-piece maple/bubinga Universe neck and original swirl-paint job by Darren Johansen (the painter of the original Universe 77 MC guitars).

In February 2010, Vai announced the introduction of "VaiTunes", a platform used to release digital-only singles via iTunes and other digital media outlets. In April, Vai performed with Mary J. Blige, Orianthi, Randy Jackson, and Travis Barker for a rendition of the Led Zeppelin classic "Stairway to Heaven", on the hit television show American Idol.

October 2010 saw more movement from Vai as a composer, with the premiere of two original symphonies at the Steve Vai Festival in Groningen, the Netherlands, and performed by the North Netherlands Orchestra. Shortly after the festival, Vai embarked on the Experience Hendrix tour (along with Eric Johnson, Kenny Wayne Shepherd, Susan Tedeschi, Billy Cox, Vernon Reid, Robert Randolph, Jonny Lang, Brad Whitford, and others) for a nationwide tour of the United States.

In March 2011, Vai (in conjunction with the online education division of Berklee College of Music) set a Guinness World Record for the world's largest online guitar lesson. The lesson was held as a promotion for Berklee's online "Steve Vai Guitar Techniques" course, which Vai helped to construct. In April 2011, Vai (along with music and technology entrepreneur Andy Alt) announced the launch of GuitarTV, an online streaming website dedicated to bringing free guitar-related content to the community of guitar players around the world.

Vai's eighth studio album, The Story of Light, was released in August 2012 as the second installment in the Real Illusions concept album trilogy. The Story of Light tour, which began on the month of the album's release, spanned 254 engagements in 52 countries, ending in September 2014. This tour yielded the 2015 release of Vai's fourth live DVD project Stillness in Motion, filmed in October 2012 during his Story of Light tour at the Club Nokia in Los Angeles. Released on April 7, the double-disc set contained a copy of the Stillness in Motion concert footage and a special bonus feature disc called The Space Between the Notes. The latter is a complete chronological timeline of the Story of Light tour, with a video or picture representation of each show of all of the 254 engagements attended.

2014 saw the announcement of a new, intensive guitar camp called the "Vai Academy", which was an evolution of the Alien Guitar Secrets masterclass. Each year the camp is held, Vai creates a syllabus with a particular theme and invites special guests to help him teach it. During the day, Vai and the special guests (some of whom have been Guthrie Govan, Jeff Baxter, Vernon Reid, Eric Johnson, Sonny Landreth, and others) hold classes in which they add their insight and perspective to the theme. Each evening, Vai and the special guests jam with the campers. The themes have included 2014's Vai Academy- Song Evolution Camp, and 2015's Vai Academy: All About the Guitar.

Vai has announced an upcoming 2016 release commemorating the 25th anniversary of Passion and Warfare. This release contains remastered songs from the album, as well as the inclusion of a new album of material written from the time between the recording of Passion and Warfare and his first solo album Flex-Able. After the release, Vai held a world tour in which he played the entire Passion and Warfare album, along with material from the new release. The tour would continue during the first half of 2017.

In 2014, Steve Vai with Roman Miroshnichenko's rock-band and the 80-piece Russian Philharmonic performed in Russia. Next year, double disc DVD "Stillness in Motion: Vai Live in L.A.Stillness In Motion" was released with a bonus disc premiering "The Space Between the Notes", a revelatory video diary consisting of more than three and a half hours of footage, lensed around the world on-stage, off-stage and behind-the-scenes, rehearsal and the show moments of Steve's joint performance with Roman Miroshnichenko and orchestra during Vai's "Story of Light" World Tour.

In 2016, Vai played an uncredited guitar solo on the track "Go!," from the album Junk by French electronic band M83. In April and May of the same year, Vai took part in the Generation Axe tour, alongside Tosin Abasi, Nuno Bettencourt, Yngwie Malmsteen, and Zakk Wylde. Starting in June, Vai embarked on the Passion and Warfare 25th Anniversary World Tour, where he played the album in its entirety for the first time.

Vai is a featured artist on the track "Do You Feel Love" from Jacob Collier's 2019 album Djesse Vol. 2.

=== 2020–present ===
On December 1, 2021, Steve Vai announced the release of his tenth studio album, entitled Inviolate, alongside its lead single "Little Pretty". The album was released on January 28, 2022. Upon release, it debuted at No. 1 on the Current Hard Rock Albums chart (his first No. 1 album), No. 8 on Top Hard Rock Albums, and No. 40 on Top Album Sales. To support the album, Vai embarked upon a 54-date American tour of the same name. In 2021, Vai was also featured on a track called "Lost Children of the Universe" on the latest album by Star One, a project led by Arjen Anthony Lucassen.

In 2022, Vai was featured on Polyphia's track "Ego Death".

On November 10, 2022, Vai announced his latest album, Vai/Gash, alongside its lead single "In The Wind". Vai and singer Johnny "Gash" Sombrotto had recorded the album in 1991, but it remained unpublished after Sombrotto's death in a motorcycle accident on September 7, 1998. Vai and Sombrotto had bonded over a shared love of motorcycles. The album cover features a photo of Sombretto, showing the extensive burn scars he sustained in a 1977 motorcycle crash. The album released on January 27, 2023.

Having previously covered her composition, "Mullach a tSí" for The Story of Light in 2012 and performing together in Vicar Street in Dublin, Vai collaborated with Pádraigín Ní Uallacháin for the title track of her 2023 album, Seven Daughters of the Sea.

In early 2024, Vai, Satriani, and Eric Johnson embarked on a limited-run "Reunion" tour of the original G3 lineup. Subsequently, Vai and Satriani continued touring as a double-bill. After more than 50 years of professional and personal friendship, the pair wrote and recorded their first single "The Sea Of Emotion, Pt.1", released on March 29, 2024.

In September 2024, Vai joined Adrian Belew, Tony Levin and Tool drummer Danny Carey on a three-month tour of North America called "Beat". A reinterpretation of the 1980s King Crimson albums Discipline, Beat and Three of a Perfect Pair. The band continued to tour Latin America and Japan through the Spring of 2025 and Europe in 2026.

In 2025, Vai announced a European tour with Joe Satriani as SATCHVAI, scheduled for the summer. In an interview, he discussed preparations for the tour, as well as his latest projects. Animals as Leaders will support their 2026 North American tour.

== Media appearances ==
=== Steve Vai – His First 30 Years: The Documentary ===
In 2022, a 77 minutes long documentary was released to honor his first 30 years. This is the first documentary covering Vai's life from 1960 to 1990. It was co-written by Steve Vai. The video covers his life growing up, attending Berklee College of Music, playing with several artists like Frank Zappa, Alcatrazz, the David Lee Roth band, and Whitesnake, the recording of both his solo albums Flex-Able and Passion and Warfare, plus Vai's role in the movie Crossroads, and how he helped create the Ibanez JEM guitar.

=== Video games ===
"Juice", from Alien Love Secrets, was featured on the 1996 video game Formula One for the PlayStation. Vai's guitar work also appeared in the 2002 video game Grand Theft Auto: Vice City. David Lee Roth's "Yankee Rose" was featured on Vice City's soundtrack, as well as "God Blessed Video" by Alcatrazz, as part of the Lazlow-led, 1980s rock/metal radio station "V-Rock."

In 2004, Vai was featured on the original soundtrack to the Xbox video game Halo 2, performing a heavy rock guitar rendition of the "Halo theme" known as "Halo Theme (MJOLNIR Mix)", which notably included a signature dive bomb opening. He also performed on the track "Never Surrender". He later featured in the second volume of the soundtrack, where he performed a heavy rock guitar solo on the track "Reclaimer". 10 years later, Vai returned to re-record his Halo 2 work for the Halo 2 Anniversary Original Soundtrack, namely the remakes "Halo Theme (Gungir Mix)" and "Genesong", which was released in 2014 and were included as part of the anniversary edition of Halo 2. In an interview shot during the development of Halo 2 Anniversary, Vai revealed that his part in the original soundtrack was a last-minute inclusion and was because of a chance invitation by producer Nile Rodgers, when they were coincidentally both in Seattle.

In 2008, Vai's song "For the Love of God" and "Halo Theme (MJOLNIR Mix)" were featured as downloadable tracks for the game Guitar Hero 3. A live version of "For the Love of God" was also available on the Rock Band Network service, as well as the song "Get the Hell Out of Here" from his 2002 compilation album The Elusive Light and Sound Vol. 1 on March 4, 2010. "The Attitude Song" and a live version of "The Crying Machine" were both also added to the Rock Band Network. A re-recording of "Speeding" is featured in the 2010 video game Guitar Hero: Warriors of Rock for Xbox 360, Wii and PlayStation 3.

=== Films ===
In 1986, Vai was cast in director Walter Hill's film Crossroads as the Devil's guitar player "Jack Butler." In the "cutting heads" scene between Vai's Jack Butler and Ralph Macchio's Eugene "Lightning" Martone, Vai wrote and performed all guitar parts with the exception of the slide guitar (which was performed by Ry Cooder). The main body of the final piece performed in the duel scene (the fast-paced neoclassical track "Eugene's Trick Bag") was based heavily on Niccolò Paganini's Capriccio number 5. The Crossroads duel appeared on the 2002 album The Elusive Light and Sound Vol. 1.

In 1987, Vai performed "Amazing Grace" in the film Dudes. In 1991, Vai performed on the film Bill & Ted's Bogus Journey, as well as on 1992's Encino Man, PCU (1994), and John Carpenter's Ghosts of Mars (where he played on the tracks "Ghosts of Mars" and "Ghost Poppin'").

In 2010, Vai's record label Favored Nations produced and released the award-winning original motion picture Crazy. An independent film, Crazy was inspired by the life and music of the guitarist Hank Garland.

== Style and influence ==
At the age of thirteen, after having purchased his first guitar and begun taking his first lessons from fellow New York native Joe Satriani, Vai became obsessed with the discipline of practice - he has maintained a rigid and structured ten-to-fifteen hour-a-day practice schedule throughout his career. During his employment by Frank Zappa, Vai transcribed and played very rhythmically complex music, believing that if started slow and perfected, any piece of music could be played.

Vai's first solo album, Flex-Able, began his career as a solo artist in 1984. During the period of time that the album was recorded, Vai was heavily influenced by his previous tenure in Frank Zappa's band. Originally not intended for release, Flex-Able expressed a certain creative "quirky" and "angular" freedom in the eclectic nature of Vai's writing style. Passion and Warfare, Vai's second solo album, expressed a more mature and evolved "signature" style but retained a certain freedom of unfettered inspiration that would continue to influence Vai's future releases. In speaking of his inspiration, Vai has said that it comes to him in many forms (even from the flowers pushed up against a fence outside of his studio, which he transcribed and used in the ninth track "Weeping China Doll", from The Story of Light. While expressing that he is not continuously inspired, Vai uses a concept he calls "musical meditation" to enter a state of consciousness that he calls "The Ultra Zone". When inside this un-critical frame of mind, Vai is able to achieve inspiration in the form of musical ideas (often in forms of melody or rhythm). For these moments of inspiration, Vai created what he calls the "Infinity Shelf", a drive of thousands of snippets of song ideas that he has collected over his entire career. These esoteric principles are taught by Vai during his Alien Guitar Secrets masterclasses, among a host of other information.

Vai's playing style utilizes specialized guitar techniques (such as two-handed tapping, alternate picking, legato, hybrid picking, sweep picking, whammy bar acrobatics, and circular vibrato) in his music, as well as a wide range of recording techniques.

Vai cites artists such as Jimmy Page, Brian May, Ritchie Blackmore, Jeff Beck, Jimi Hendrix, as well as jazz fusion guitarists Allan Holdsworth and Al Di Meola as some of his major influences.

== Notable contributions ==
=== Work with Frank Zappa ===
As a transcriptionist for Frank Zappa, Vai transcribed some of Zappa's most rhythmically complex music, using a range of conceptualizations for the notation of rhythmic music. Vai says "While transcribing the material, I was often confronted with situations that led me to reach into the intuitional areas of my imagination to come up with various notational devices and constructions that I had never seen before. I soon discovered that many contemporary composers were then (and are still) using these notations". These concepts can be seen throughout the "Frank Zappa Guitar Book", which were composed of Vai's guitar and drum transcriptions from various Zappa albums. Vai toured with Zappa from 1980 to 1983, performing selections of this technically demanding music with Zappa's band at the time.

=== JEM, PIA, and Universe guitars ===
Vai designed the Ibanez JEM guitar, a unique instrument that incorporated a series of groundbreaking designs that have since become staples in feature throughout the guitar industry, in 1985. In speaking of the development of the guitar, Vai says, "Stratocasters had whammy bars—which were fantastic—but they were very limited, were always going out of tune, and had single-coil pickups. Les Pauls had humbuckers—which gave you that real scream in the bridge position—but no whammy bar, and I didn't like the way they sat. Neither guitar had twenty-four frets. So I went to a guitar shop in Hollywood, where I had these elements implemented into a guitar (what would have been considered a Superstrat at the time). The guitar was designed with a sharper body shape, a large cutaway around the neck, twenty-four frets, a fully floating tremolo system, a specially wired five-way pickup selector switch, and an output jack angled on the side of the body (so that when you step on the cable, it doesn't pull out of your guitar). I knew of course that these features would eventually be taken and used in other guitars, so I did something completely preposterous: I said, 'Put a handle in it!' That way, during videos and photoshoots I could swing the guitar around."

Vai had several custom prototypes of these guitars built (which were used on the Eat 'Em and Smile tour) by Joe "Jem" Despagni, a custom guitar luthier and friend of Vai's. Due to Vai's highly coveted position in Roth's band, many guitar companies were eager to propose endorsement opportunities. In response to these offers, Vai sent out the specifications of the JEM guitar, detailing that the company that returned the best guitar would be given the endorsement. Dissatisfied with the guitars returned and unwilling to compromise, Vai held out on a guitar endorsement until Ibanez approached him, sending him an instrument superior to that of the other companies and willing to follow his instructions. After the pre-production prototypes were perfected, the first production Ibanez JEM 777 guitars were unveiled at the NAMM Show in 1987. Since its original 1987 release, the JEM has become one of the longest-running and most successful signature series guitars in history, with its sister guitar, the Ibanez RG, being the second highest-selling guitar (behind the Fender Stratocaster) on the market.

Another design by Vai was the Ibanez Universe, the first production seven-string guitar, which was released in 1989. The Universe incorporated many of the aspects that made the JEM a unique instrument (2 octave fretboard, full floating tremolo, humbucker/single coil/humbucker pickup configuration, angled output jack and deeper body cutaways), with an added low 'B' string, allowing for new low-range sonic possibilities. Used by Vai on much of Passion and Warfare and all of Whitesnake's Slip of the Tongue, the Universe was a large stepping stone for the burgeoning Nu-metal genre (with bands such as Korn, Limp Bizkit, Fear Factory and Meshuggah having adopted the instrument and incorporating it into their signature sound).

On April 4 of 2020 the Ibanez PIA was introduced, which Vai says is a modernized and mature form of his original JEM. The PIA model (named after his wife Pia Maiocco) features an alder body and a 5-piece maple / walnut neck with 24 frets, rosewood fretboard with the usual floral inlays. The neck is styled in the classic Ibanez wizard III neck - 430mmR neck radius. The primary ways in which this guitar differs from the JEM are its softer body curves, and the presence of a Petal Grip handle replacing the original Monkey Grip cutout. It also sports DiMarzio UtoPIA pickups in an HSH configuration, gold hardware and a Prestige locking vibrato unit.

=== Alien Guitar Secrets masterclasses ===
Having always enjoyed teaching and sharing his experiences in life and in the music business, Vai began a series of "Alien Guitar Secrets" masterclasses in 2006 - a touring masterclass in which Vai holds open forum discussion about his own experiences in the music industry, explains the key principles to understanding success, plays to backing tracks (often inviting class attendees to jam with him), answers questions, articulates key points of guitar technique, and more importantly goes beyond the technique and into the more profound esoteric principles at play. Vai details certain concepts he has discovered that have helped him in all areas of his life and career, both in playing guitar/ musically as well as spiritually. Vai accessibly shares these concepts with masterclass participants using examples from his own experiences, delving into the ongoing process of identifying the self-critical nature of one's own thoughts. Vai explains the techniques and exercises he uses to circumnavigate one's own insecurities and thoughts of self-doubt, and encourages masterclass participants to use these tools in their own lives. Often embarking on masterclass tours through Europe, South America, and Russia, Vai considers this ongoing series of classes as one of his most important contributions.

=== Eventide H3000 Ultra-Harmonizer ===
Guitar effects manufacturer Eventide approached Vai in the mid-1980s to contribute unique ideas for their H3000 effects unit. Vai suggested many specific concepts, such as diatonic pitch change and multi-voice harmony, that were used in the unit and have since become standard algorithms in guitar effects processors.

=== DiMarzio pickups ===
In 1993, Vai's signature series high-output "Evolution" humbucker pickup set was released by DiMarzio. The Evolution pickups use DiMarzio's patented "Dual-Resonance" design. The "EVO 2" humbucker, a lower output model, was released in 2004.

=== Carvin Legacy amplifier ===
In 1997, Vai had begun working with the Carvin Corporation to design a signature series of Legacy amplifiers, which were used on his 1999 Epic Records release The Ultra Zone. The original Legacy I model was released in 1999, with the most recent Legacy III being released in 2012.

=== Touring ===
In the 1990s, Vai began touring in European and Asian countries (such as Russia and China) as well as South America, often having been the first American rock act in history to have performed in these areas. In 2014, Vai performed on the Chinese television station BTV's Spring Festival Global Gala, a program broadcast to over two billion viewers. With the broadcasting of this event on January 26, 2014, Vai became the first rock artist ever broadcast on a Chinese television program.

== Equipment ==
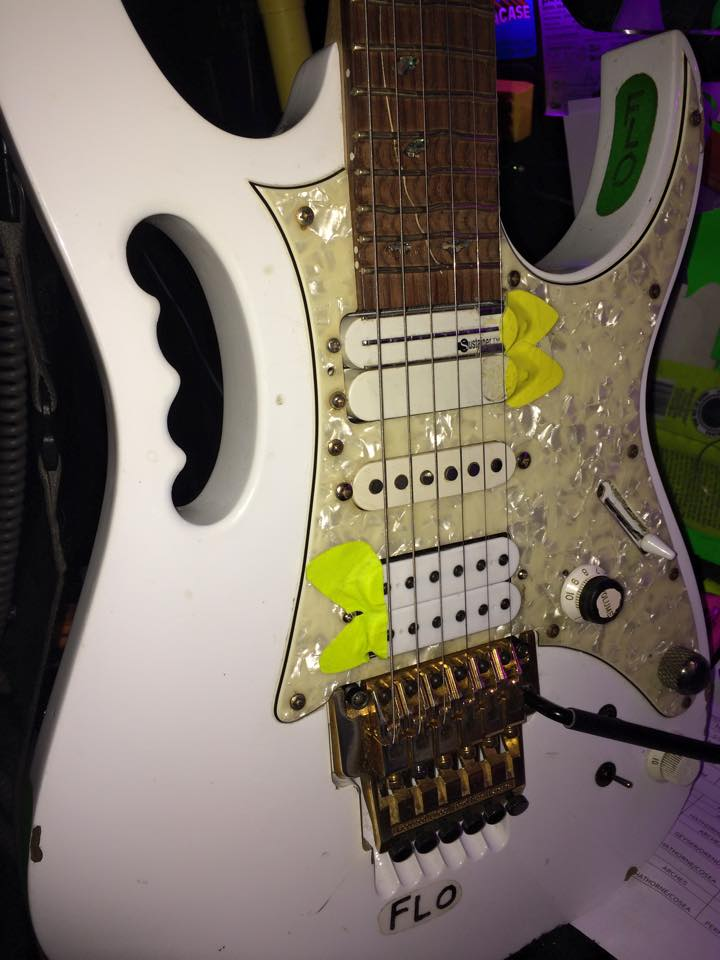
Vai's FLO guitar in 2014

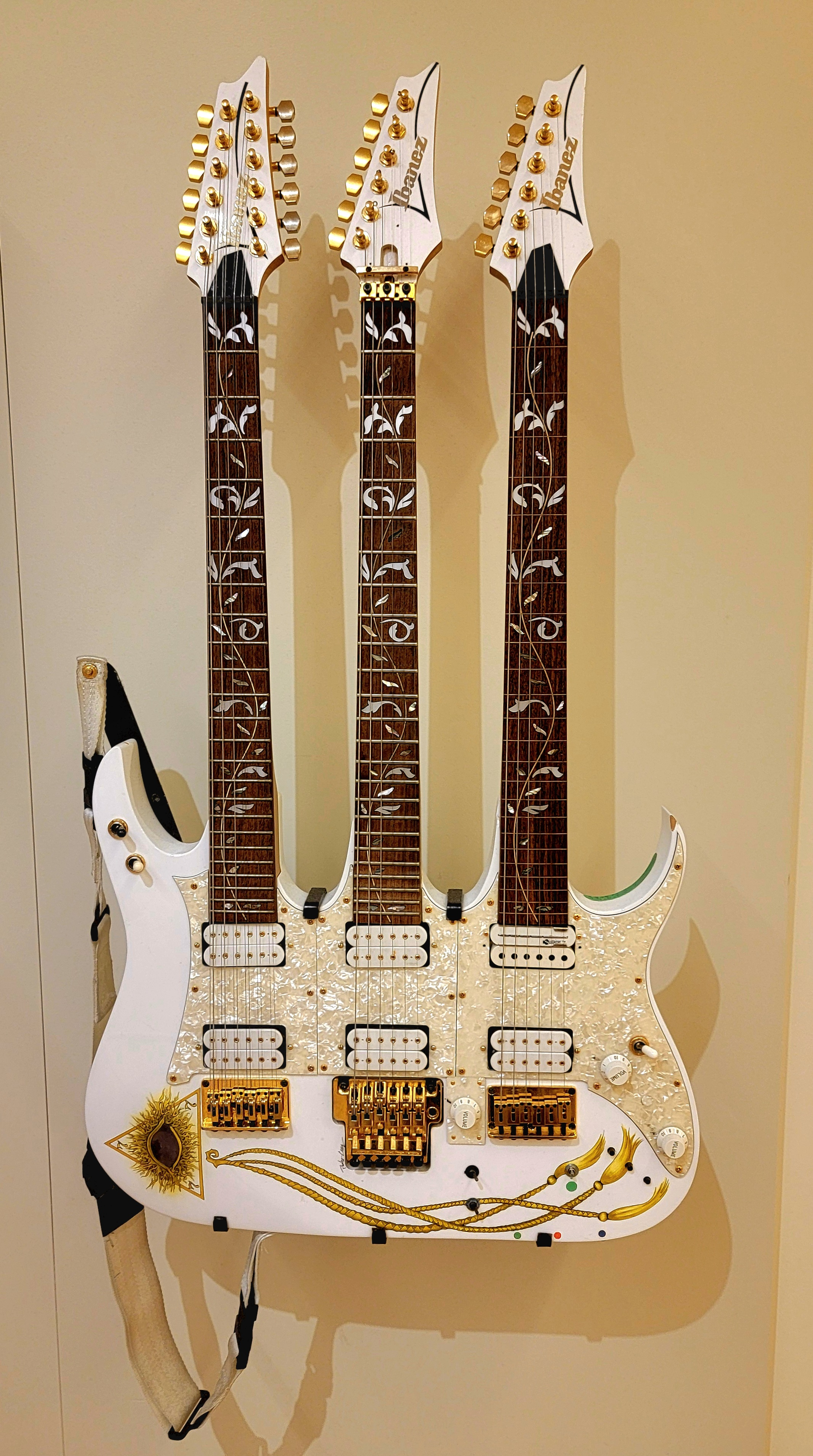
Ibanez triple neck guitar owned by Steve Vai on display at the Musical Instrument Museum, Phoenix, Arizona

Vai's personal studio, The Harmony Hut, is a large edifice located in his backyard equipped with a full control room and performance room. The studio, built in 2011, is where Vai currently produces, records, and mixes his new material. Vai has two main signature series Ibanez JEM six-string guitars (dubbed "EVO" and "FLO III") that he uses live and in the studio. "EVO", a prototype Ibanez JEM 7VWH, was received in 1993 while developing Vai's signature DiMarzio Evolution pickups (hence the name of the guitar), and "FLO III" is a basswood Ibanez Los Angeles Custom Shop JEM 7VWH equipped with a Fernandes Sustainer system. The bridge pickup of FLO III used to be a DiMarzio PAF Pro pickup, but it has been exchanged with a DiMarzio Evolution in recent years. Since early 2022, Vai has been frequently using the 2nd prototype of the Onyx Black Ibanez PIA along with "EVO" and "FLO III", which he nicknamed "ONYX". "ONYX" has a lightly scalloped neck and used to be outfitted with a Sustaniac system which was recently changed with a Fernandes sustainer system.

His other favourite guitars include "BO", a JEM77BRMR prototype, also equipped with Fernandes Sustainer system and blue LED dot inlays, which was stolen in 2015, but later recovered; the original "FLO" guitar, a transformed original 77FP JEM to 7VWH specifications, also equipped with Fernandes Sustainer System and EVO 2 bridge pickup; "Bruno" aka "For the Love of God" Ibanez Universe UV77MC seven-string guitar with burnt finish and mirror pickguard (this guitar was used in the For the Love of God music video); "NILE", 1st Onyx Black PIA prototype used heavily on Inviolate album; and "XAVIA", a customised 2007 JEM 7VWH with heavily scalloped neck and Fernandes Sustainer system usually used as a backup for or in place of "FLO III". Vai uses his signature Carvin Legacy amplifier, as well as Morley Pedals, with whom he has his signature Bad Horsie and Bad Horsie II wah pedals, and Little Alligator volume pedal. Vai uses the Ibanez Jemini distortion pedal, a signature twin distortion pedal with separate overdrive and distortion sections.

Before his endorsement deal with Ibanez, Vai endorsed Charvel guitars, most notably using a green and black San Dimas model. In addition, over the course of his career, Vai has used guitars made by various other companies, including Jackson, Fender, and Gavtone.

Vai's preferred string gauge has usually been 9-42 Ernie Ball Strings.

=== Guitar rig and signal flow ===
Vai's 2016 live guitar rig utilizes his signature Carvin Legacy amplifier (now on its third version), the Fractal Audio Axe-Fx II XL, and an MFC-101 foot controller.

Depending on the location and venue, Vai will use either his Legacy I or Legacy III heads, and Carvin Legacy 4x12 speaker cabinets loaded with Celestion Vintage 30 speakers. Vai uses EL-34 tubes by Groove Tubes in his Legacy amps.

Vai uses the Fractal Audio Axe-Fx II XL as the only modulation effects unit in his guitar rig. Generally for live use he utilizes the unit for stereo effects such as delay, chorus, and phase, with a separate preset for the parameters of each different song in his setlist. The Axe-Fx MFC-101 foot controller is set up in conjunction with the unit, allowing Vai to switch effects on and off in a fashion reminiscent to that of standard stompboxes.

Vai's pedalboard consists of a wah-wah pedal (either his Morley Bad Horsie signature pedal, or a Dunlop Cry Baby 95q), an Ibanez Jemini twin distortion pedal, and DigiTech Whammy DT pitch shifting pedal. The centerpiece of the pedalboard is the Axe-Fx MFC-101 foot controller for the Axe-Fx II XL, which, as previously mentioned, controls the effects in a manner similar to switching on and off stompboxes. There are two expression pedals used for the Axe-Fx, one to act as a volume pedal, and the other to control the harmonizer built into the Axe-Fx unit.

The signal from the guitar (usually one of the main guitars "EVO", "FLO III" or more recently, "ONYX") goes into either the Morley Bad Horsie or Dunlop 95q wah pedal. From there, it goes directly into the Ibanez Jemini twin distortion pedal, and then to the Digitech Whammy DT. From the output of the Whammy, the signal heads into the input of the Carvin Legacy amplifier head. Out of the effects loop of the Legacy, the signal heads directly into the Axe-Fx II XL, where it is split into stereo and the effects are applied (and controlled via the MFC-101 foot controller). Out of the output of the Axe-Fx, one signal is sent back to the original Legacy head return, and a second is sent to a second Carvin Legacy head return, bypassing the preamp stage completely and acting as a slave power amp. Vai utilizes his stereo setup on effects like delay, where he sets up two separate delay times (one slower and one faster) and allows them to alternate back and forth. The signal is then sent from the amp to the 4x12 Carvin Legacy speaker cabinets loaded with Celestion Vintage 30 speakers. Vai uses AKG microphones to mic his amps, and uses a separate Carvin power amp to power a direct guitar monitor cabinet instead of relying on the PA.

Detailed gear diagrams of both Vai's 1999 and 2007 guitar rigs are well-documented.

== Personal life ==
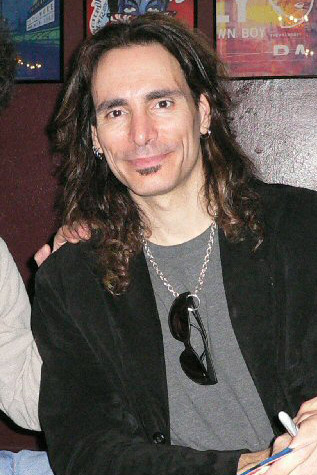
Vai in 2007

Beginning in the late 1990s, Vai resided in Encino, Los Angeles with his family; in 2025 Vai relocated to the San Diego area. Vai is married to Pia Maiocco, former bassist of the band Vixen (who can be seen in the 1984 film Hardbodies), with whom he has two children, Julian and Fire Vai. Vai is also a vegetarian and a beekeeper, regularly tending to the beehives kept on his Encino property.

== Band history ==
Not including guest appearances.

Early bands

- The Ohio Express (1971–1972)
- Circus (c. 1973 to 1976)
- Rayge (c. 1973 to 1976)
- Bold As Love (1977)

Berklee bands

- Axis (1978–1979)
- Morning Thunder (1979)

Professional bands

- Frank Zappa (1980–1982)
- The Out Band (c. 1983)
- The Classified (1984)
- 777 (1984)
- Alcatrazz (1984–1985)
- David Lee Roth (1985–1989)
- Whitesnake (1989–1990)
- Beat (2024–present)

Solo band (1992–1994)

Sex & Religion album

- Vocals: Devin Townsend
- Guitar: Steve Vai
- Bass: TM Stevens
- Drums: Terry Bozzio

"Sex & Religion" tour

- Vocals, Guitar: Devin Townsend
- Guitar, Vocals: Steve Vai
- Bass: Scott Thunes
- Keys: Will Riley
- Drums: Abe Laboriel, Jr., then Toss Panos

1995

- Guitar: Steve Vai
- Bass: Tony Pimental, then Scott Thunes
- Keys: Will Riley
- Drums: Chris Frazier

This band toured Russia twice, South America and the US (opening for Bon Jovi).

1996–1999

- Guitar, Vocals: Steve Vai
- Guitar, Vocals and Keys: Mike Keneally
- Fretted and Fretless Bass, Vocals: Philip Bynoe
- Drums: Mike Mangini

2000

- Guitar, Vocals: Steve Vai
- Guitar, Vocals and Keys: Mike Keneally
- Guitar: Dave Weiner
- Fretted and Fretless Bass, Vocals: Philip Bynoe
- Drums: Mike Mangini
- Keyboards (South American Tour): Eric Goldberg
- Drums (South American Tour): Chris Frazier

2001–2002 – "The Breed"

- Guitar, Vocals: Steve Vai
- Bass, Vocals: Billy Sheehan
- Guitar, Keys: Mike Keneally, then Tony MacAlpine
- Acoustic and Electric Guitars, Sitar: Dave Weiner
- Drums: Virgil Donati

2003–2005 – "The Breed"

- Guitar, Vocals: Steve Vai
- Bass, Vocals: Billy Sheehan
- Guitar, Keys: Tony MacAlpine
- Acoustic and Electric Guitars, Sitar: Dave Weiner
- Acoustic and Electronic Drums & Percussion: Jeremy Colson

2007 – "String Theories"

- Guitar, Vocals: Steve Vai
- Fretted and Fretless Bass: Bryan Beller (Philip Bynoe on the South American leg)
- Violin and Keys: Ann Marie Calhoun
- Violin and Keys: Alex DePue
- Acoustic and Electric Guitars, Sitar: Dave Weiner
- Acoustic and Electronic Drums & Percussion: Jeremy Colson

2012 – "The Story of Light Band"

- Guitar, Vocals: Steve Vai
- Fretted and Fretless Bass, Vocals: Philip Bynoe
- Acoustic and Electric Harp: Deborah Henson-Conant
- Acoustic and Electric Guitars, Sitar: Dave Weiner
- Acoustic and Electronic Drums and Percussion: Jeremy Colson

2013 – "The Story of Light Band, Australia, New Zealand and Asian Leg"

- Guitar, Vocals: Steve Vai
- Fretted and Fretless Bass, Vocals: Philip Bynoe
- Acoustic and Electric Guitars: Dave Weiner
- Acoustic and Electronic Drums and Percussion: Jeremy Colson
- Keyboards: Michael Arrom

2015 – "Stillness in Motion: Live DVD Band"

- Guitar, Vocals: Steve Vai
- Fretted and Fretless Bass, Vocals: Philip Bynoe
- Acoustic and Electric Guitars: Dave Weiner
- Acoustic & Electronic Drums and Percussion: Jeremy Colson
- Sitar: Fire Vai

2016 – "Passion and Warfare 25th Anniversary Tour"

- Guitar, Vocal: Steve Vai
- Fretted and Fretless Bass, Vocals: Philip Bynoe
- Acoustic and Electric Guitars, Keyboards: Dave Weiner
- Acoustic and Electronic Drums & Percussion: Jeremy Colson

== Discography ==
Vai began his recording career in 1980 with Frank Zappa and has since collaborated with numerous artists and bands. In 1983, Vai began his career as a solo artist with his release of Flex-Able, and solidified his place as a virtuoso rock guitarist with his acclaimed 1990 release of Passion and Warfare. His discography consists of nine studio albums, two EPs, two special albums, eight live albums, twelve soundtracks, twenty compilation albums, and six DVD releases.

Studio albums:

- Flex-Able (1984)
- Passion and Warfare (1990)
- Sex & Religion (1993)
- Fire Garden (1996)
- Flex-Able Leftovers (1998)
- The Ultra Zone (1999)
- Real Illusions: Reflections (2005)
- The Story of Light (2012)
- Modern Primitive (2016)
- Inviolate (2022)
- Vai/Gash (2023)

== Grammy Awards ==
These are the three wins from Vai's 15 solo or collaborative nominations:

- 1993: Steve Vai – Best Rock Instrumental Performance for "Sofa" from Zappa's Universe
- 2002: Steve Vai et al – Best Pop Instrumental Album for No Substitutions: Live in Osaka
- 2008: Steve Vai et al – Best Rock Instrumental Performance for "Peaches en Regalia" single from a Zappa Plays Zappa tour

== See also ==
- List of rock instrumentals
- Steve Vai songs
