= Fire Garden =

Studio album by Steve Vai
- Released: September 17, 1996
- Studio: Mothership (Hollywood Hills)
- Genre: Instrumental rock; hard rock
- Length: 74:05
- Label: Epic
- Producer: Steve Vai

Steve Vai chronology
Alien Love Secrets (1995)	Fire Garden (1996)	Flex-Able Leftovers (1998)

Fire Garden is the fourth studio album by guitarist Steve Vai, released on September 17, 1996, through Epic Records. The album reached No. 106 on the U.S. Billboard 200 and remained on that chart for two weeks, as well as reaching the top 100 in three other countries.

== Overview ==
As described by Vai in the liner notes, Fire Garden is a concept album divided into two "phases": "Phase 1" comprises tracks 1–9 and is entirely instrumental (with the exception of Devin Townsend's backwards vocals on "Whookam" and some more vocals toward the end of "Fire Garden Suite"), while "Phase 2", the remainder of the album, features Vai on vocals on every song except the instrumental "Warm Regards". Fire Garden was intended to be a double album, but during mastering Vai heard about the new 80-minute CD format (instead of 74 for a standard CD), which meant that both sides were able to fit onto a single disc.

"Dyin' Day" was co-written by Ozzy Osbourne during the writing sessions for Osbourne's 1995 album Ozzmosis. Another song from those sessions, "My Little Man", made its way onto Ozzmosis and is credited on that album as being co-written by Vai.

== Critical reception ==
Professional ratings
Review scores
Source	Rating
AllMusic	4/5 stars

Stephen Thomas Erlewine at AllMusic gave Fire Garden four stars out of five, calling it "An impressive effort from a musician who continues to grow and stretch himself with each new release" and "enjoyable for non-guitar freaks, as well." He said that Vai's vocals "still have a way to go before they are as expressive as his instrumental work, but this subtle and dense concept album is the closest he's ever gotten to integrating the two sides of his musical personality together."

== Track listing ==
All tracks are written by Steve Vai, except where noted.

"Phase 1"
No.	Title	Length
1.	"There's a Fire in the House"	5:26
2.	"The Crying Machine"	4:50
3.	"Dyin' Day" (Vai, Ozzy Osbourne)	4:29
4.	"Whookam"	0:36
5.	"Blowfish"	4:03
6.	"The Mysterious Murder of Christian Tiera's Lover"	1:02
7.	"Hand on Heart"	5:25
8.	"Bangkok" (Benny Andersson, Björn Ulvaeus, Tim Rice)	2:46
9.	"Fire Garden Suite": "Bull Whip"; "Pusa Road"; "Angel Food"; "Taurus Bulba"	9:56

"Phase 2"
No.	Title	Length
10.	"Deepness"	0:47
11.	"Little Alligator"	6:12
12.	"All About Eve"	4:38
13.	"Aching Hunger"	4:45
14.	"Brother"	5:04
15.	"Damn You"	4:31
16.	"When I Was a Little Boy"	1:18
17.	"Genocide"	4:11
18.	"Warm Regards"	4:06
Total length:		74:05

== Personnel ==
- Steve Vai – lead vocals, guitar, all other instrumentation (except where noted), arrangement, engineering, production
- Devin Townsend – lead vocals (tracks 4, 9)
- Will Riley – keyboard (track 14)
- John Avila – bass (track 2)
- Stuart Hamm – bass (track 3)
- Fabrizio Gossi – bass (track 14)
- Chris Frazier – drums (track 1)
- Greg Bissonette – drums (track 2)
- Deen Castronovo – drums (tracks 3, 5, 7, 11, 12, 15)
- Mike Mangini – drums (tracks 8, 9)
- Robin DiMaggio – drums (track 14)
- C.C. White – background vocals (tracks 12, 17)
- Tracee Lewis – background vocals (tracks 12, 17)
- Miroslava Mendoza Escriba – background vocals (tracks 12, 17)
- Kimberly Evans – background vocals (tracks 12, 17)
- John Sombrotto – background vocals (track 17)
- Mark McCrite – background vocals (track 17)
- Jim Altan – background vocals (track 17)
- Julian Vai – spoken vocals (track 18)
- Marcelo Gomes – engineering assistance
- Sergio Buss – engineering assistance
- T. J. Helmerich – engineering assistance (track 17)
- Bernie Grundman – mastering

== Chart performance ==
Chart (1996)	Peak position
Australian Albums (ARIA)	179
Finnish albums chart	22
French albums chart	30
Dutch albums chart	85
US Billboard 200	106
