= Jeff Forrest =

American recording engineer

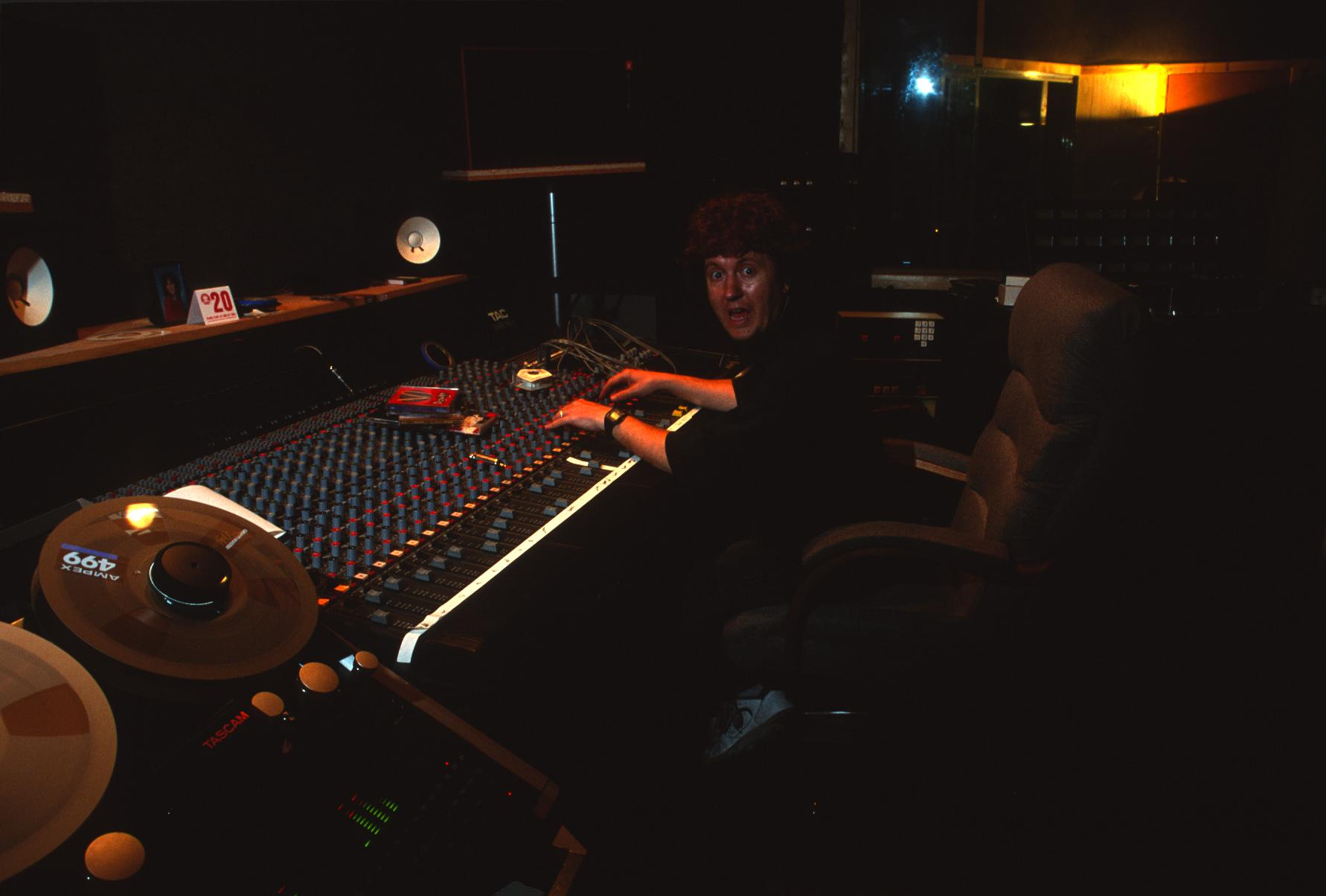
- Jeff Forrest at Doubletime Recording Studio
- Born: Flint, Michigan, U.S.
- Education: Central Michigan University, Berklee College of Music
- Occupations: Recording engineer, producer
- Years active: 1980s–present
- Known for: Engineering Blink-182's Cheshire Cat, owner of Doubletime Recording Studio

Jeff Forrest is an American recording engineer.

== Bio and career ==
Jeff Forrest was born in Flint, Michigan, and attended Central Michigan University and The Berklee College of Music. Jeff Forrest is a recording engineer from the San Diego area who is most known for engineering Blink-182's first album Cheshire Cat (Blink-182 album). He is also credited for co-writing Blink-182's song "Wasting Time". Jeff Forrest owns Doubletime Recording Studio in San Diego, CA and has worked on records for regional bands such as Rocket From the Crypt, Fluf, Jejune, Jack's Broken Heart, No Gimmick and Kill Holiday. Forrest's most recent work is with the band 'Pink Yacht Club'.

Forrest moved from Atlanta to Los Angeles in the late 1980s looking to catch on with the music industry. Forrest spent years recording under the moniker 'Forrest Butler' producing music for artists at his previous studio (East County Studio). Forrest eventually became a producer and started his own label 'Immune Label'. Immune Records released Mike Keneally's hat, Boil that Dust Speck, Half Alive in Hollywood and The Mistakes.

== Discography ==
1992 hat-Mike Keneally

1992 Na Vucca Do Lupu-Three Mile Pilot

1992 Slake-Drip Tank

1993 Curves that Kick-16

1994 Buddha-Blink 182

1994 Shrunken Head-Deadbolt

1994 Songs in the Key of Bree-Buck-O-Nine

1995 Cheshire Cat-Blink 182

1995 Barfly-Buck-O-Nine

1995 Boil that Dust Speck-Mike Keneally

1995 The Classic Years- Fluf

1995 The Romantic Adventures of Harry-Gregory Page

1995 The Mistakes

1995 Kiss Me Twice I'm Schitzo-The Sort of Quartet

1995 Orien's Sky-Peggy Watson

1995 Cattle Decapitation-Ten Torments of the Damned

1996 Chiaroscuro-Turkey Mallet

1996 Drop Out- 16

1996 Half Alive in Hollywood-Mike Keneally

1997 Sluggo-Mike Keneally

1999 Cattle Decapitation-Human Jerky

2000 Cattle Decapitation-Homovore
