= Face of the Sun =

Face of the Sun may refer to:

- Sun (heraldry)
  - In particular, Sun of May the emblem on the flags of Argentina and Uruguay
- An album by Chris Eskola
- An album by Pete Johansen
- A single by Barry Stagg
- A song from The Space Between the Shadows

== See also ==
- Face of the Rising Sun (disambiguation)
- Faces to the Sun
