= The Story of Light (Steve Vai album) =

Studio album by Steve Vai
- Released: August 14, 2012
- Recorded: 2010–12
- Genre: Progressive rock, hard rock, instrumental rock
- Length: 58:30
- Label: Favored Nations
- Producer: Steve Vai

Steve Vai chronology
Real Illusions: Reflections (2005)	The Story of Light (2012)	Modern Primitive (2016)

Professional ratings
Review scores
Source	Rating
AllMusic	3.5/5 stars
PopMatters	(6/10)
Record Collector	3/5 stars

The Story of Light "Real Illusions: ...of a..." is the eighth studio album by guitarist Steve Vai, released on August 14, 2012 through Favored Nations Entertainment. It is Vai's first studio album since 2005's Real Illusions: Reflections. On May 23, 2012 The Story of Light was made available for pre-order through Vai's official website with an instant download of "Gravity Storm". The track "John the Revelator" contains a sample of Blind Willie Johnson's recording of the same song. "The Moon and I" was initially released as a VaiTunes digital only single in 2010. However, due to the personal nature of the song, Vai decided to remix it and include it on the album. The album debuted on Billboard 200 at No. 78.

== Concept ==
The Story of Light is the second installment of the Real Illusions trilogy, a "multi-layered melange based on the amplified mental exaggerations of a truth-seeking madman who sees the world through his own distorted perceptions", according to the booklet introduction. In an interview with Classic Rock Revisited, Vai explained:

When I started Real Illusions, which was my last studio record, I wanted to do a concept record, but I didn't want to do it in the conventional way. I wondered what I could do in order to make it different. I wanted it to span a long period of time, as it is probably going to be one of my life's greatest works. I wanted to break it up into little pieces and put it out, not in a linear way. If you listen to Real Illusions, then you will just hear a studio album, as you will not be able to put all of the pieces together. If you read the liner notes, then you can start to put little pieces together. The idea is the same with The Story of Light. It is like Real Illusions, as it is a studio album. That said, the songs are all based on characters in the story, but they are not in the right order. The third part of the trilogy, which I will do sometime in the future, will be similar.

According to Vai, "Captain Drake Mason... at one point writes a book. He presents his book, which is titled Under It All, to the town. The first chapter is called "The Story of Light". On the record, the lyrics are printed in English, but I didn't want to present them that way because it is too obvious. I wanted to do them in another language to add mystique. I went through all of these languages in my head trying to find the right one. Every language has a dynamic to it. Italian sounds like music, and French is effeminate, so it sounds beautiful, in a way. German has a lot of rough edges and comes off very masculine. All of those had too much of a tilt. Russian is such a beautiful language because it has just the right amount of rough edges and just the right amount of romance. Still, there is an authority to it. That is why I decided to do it in Russian."

== Track listing ==
All music is composed by Steve Vai, except where noted.

No.	Title	Lyrics	Length
1.	"The Story of Light"		6:15
2.	"Velorum"		6:09
3.	"John the Revelator" (traditional gospel)	Traditional gospel	3:40
4.	"Book of the Seven Seals"	Paul Caldwell, Sean Ivory	3:56
5.	"Creamsicle Sunset"		3:30
6.	"Gravity Storm"		5:33
7.	"Mullach a' tSí" (traditional Irish Lullaby)	Pádraigín Ní Uallacháin (also composer)	3:56
8.	"The Moon and I"	Vai	7:18
9.	"Weeping China Doll"		6:11
10.	"Racing the World"		3:45
11.	"No More Amsterdam"	Aimee Mann	4:15
12.	"Sunshine Electric Raindrops"		4:15
Total length:			58:30

Japanese edition bonus track
No.	Title	Length
13.	"People of the World"

== Personnel ==
- Steve Vai – guitar (all tracks) and vocals (tracks 8, 11), keyboards
- Philip Bynoe – bass
- Jeremy Colson – drums
- Mike Mangini – drums on "The Moon And I"
- Deborah Henson-Conant – harp (track 7)
- Beverly McClellan – vocals (track 3 and 4)
- Aimee Mann – vocals (track 11)
- Bernie Grundman – mastering
- Dave Rosenthal – piano (track 1)
- Julia Rainy May Vai – Russian narration (track 1)
- Bob Carpenter – Hammond B3 (tracks 3, 4, 12)
- Mike Keneally – keyboards (track 8)
- Dave Weiner – rhythm guitar (track 8)
