= Morricone Youth =

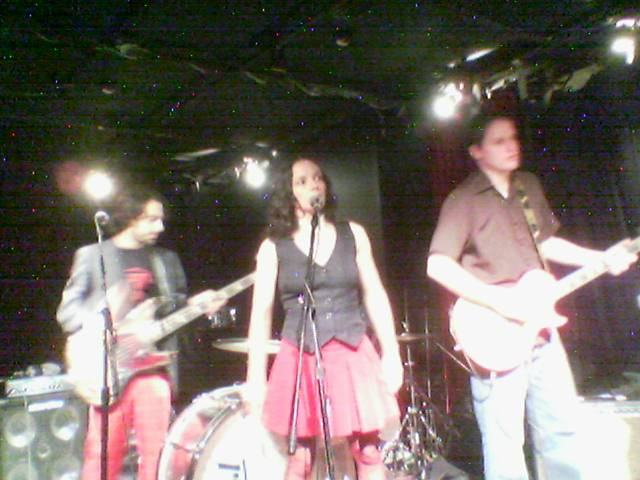
- Morricone Youth performing in 2005

Background information
- Origin: New York, New York, United States
- Genres: Rock and roll; surf; progressive rock
- Years active: 1999–present
- Label: Country Club Records
- Members: Devon E. Levins; John Castro; Dan Kessler; Jefferson Rabb; Eric Reeves; Evan Francis; Kenny Shaw; Brian Kantor; Fraser Campbell; Sami Stevens
- Past members: Robert Conroy; Dreiky Caprice; Karla Moheno; David Spinley; Frank Molina; Tony Roth; Dale W. Miller; Steve Walls; Michael Kammers; Nervous Neal Smith; Timur Yusef; Sal A. Mander; Greg O'Keeffe; Bliss Blood; Ayo Awosika; Slawek Justynski
- Website: morriconeyouth.com

Morricone Youth is a New York City band formed in 1999 dedicated to composing, performing and recording music written for the moving image (e.g., film and television soundtrack and library production music). The band is composed of present or past members of Creedle, The Rugburns, Crash Worship, Palomar, Pretendo, Pain Teens, Yellowbirds, Fruit Bats, Mikael Jorgensen of Wilco's Pronto, Tredici Bacci, Dispatch, Steve Poltz and Norah Jones.

The band regularly composes and performs original music to projected films (e.g., silent films, midnight movies, documentaries, animated films and television programs) in live settings including Jean Rollin's Fascination (1979), David Lynch's Eraserhead (1977), Rene Laloux's Fantastic Planet (1973), Lotte Reiniger's The Adventures of Prince Achmed (1926), Alfred Hitchcock's The Lodger: A Story of the London Fog (1927), George A. Romero's Night of the Living Dead (1968), Ron and Valerie Taylor's Inner Space (1972), Robert Clouse's Enter the Dragon (1973), Jack Hill's Foxy Brown (1974), Mario Bava's Danger: Diabolik (1968), Saul Bass's Phase IV (1974), George Miller's Mad Max (1979), Sergei Eisenstein's Battleship Potemkin (1925) and F.W. Murnau's Nosferatu (1922) and Sunrise: A Song of Two Humans (1927). In addition to composing its own compositions and themes for such films, the band is committed to reinterpreting portions of the original score for each film it performs. Morricone Youth is currently in the process of recording and releasing a vinyl (and digital) LP or EP for each of the fifteen live scores it has performed to date. The first two, EPs for Night of the Living Dead and The Adventures of Prince Achmed, were released in September 2016. Full length vinyl LPs for were subsequently released for Mad Max (2017), Sunrise: A Song Of Two Humans (2017), Danger: Diabolik (2018), The Lodger: The Story Of The London Fog (2021) and Battleship Potemkin (2023). The band has performed at Brooklyn Academy of Music (BAM), Philadelphia Museum of Art, Massachusetts Museum of Contemporary Art (MASS MoCA), Sydney Festival and The San Diego Museum of Art. In 2017, the band supported 1970s Italian prog soundtrack legends Goblin on their North American "Sound of Fear" tour.

Morricone Youth recorded its debut full-length album of original music entitled Silenzio Violento in 2004 with Martin Bisi at B.C. Studio in Brooklyn, New York released on October 8, 2005 by Country Club Records. Four songs from Silenzio Violento were used in documentary film Second Skin directed by Juan Carlos Pineiro about MMORPGs (Massively Multiplayer Online Role Playing Games) and the people who play them. The film premiered at the SXSW Film Festival in March 2008.

Current members include Devon E. Levins (guitar), John Castro (bass/vocals), Dan Kessler and Jefferson Rabb (analog keyboards/synthesizers), Evan Francis and Fraser Campbell (saxophone, flute, clarinet), Aaron Bahr (trumpet), Sami Stevens (vocals), and Brian Kantor, Kenny Shaw and Eric Reeves (drums).

Guitarist/founder Devon E. Levins hosted a weekly Internet radio show from 2007 to 2014 under the same name on East Village Radio playing primarily obscure film and television soundtracks and library music and interviewing soundtrack composers such as Lalo Schifrin, Howard Blake, Irmin Schmidt of Can, Claudio Simonetti and Maurizio Guarini of Goblin, Sven Libaek, John Lurie, Danny Elfman, Elliot Goldenthal, Cliff Martinez, Carter Burwell, Fabio Frizzi, Alessandro Alessandroni, Jean Michel Jarre, Suzanne Ciani, Andrzej Korzynski, Warren Ellis and Alan Howarth. The radio show was moved to WFMU under the new name Morricone Island from 2014 to the present. The East Village Radio show was also resumed in 2025 with the relaunch of the radio station.

The band has performed on and released Original Soundtrack albums for film scores composed by Devon Goldberg including those for the Kire Paputts 2020 dark comedy ‘’The Last Porno Show’’ which premiered at the 2019 Toronto International Film Festival, and Shudder’s ‘’The Last Drive-in with Joe Bob Briggs’’ director Austin Jennings 2024 horror film ’’Eight Eyes,’’ Vinegar Syndrome’s first originally-created feature length film for the genre exploitation home video distribution company and label which premiered at Fantasia International Film Festival 2023 in Montreal.

Bassist John Castro is the son of bebop jazz pianist Joe Castro.

== Discography ==
Albums:

- Magnum Force (2003) Country Club Records (CCR-003)
- Silenzio Violento (2005) Country Club Records (CC01013)
- Mad Max (2017) Country Club Records (CCR-009)
- Sunrise: A Song Of Two Humans (2017) Country Club Records (CCR-010)
- Danger: Diabolik (2018) Country Club Records (CCR-011)
- The Last Porno Show: Original Soundtrack (2020) Country Club Records (CCR-012)
- The Lodger: The Story Of The London Fog (2021) Country Club Records (CCR-013)
- Battleship Potemkin (2023) Country Club Records (CCR-014)
- Eight Eyes: Original Soundtrack (2024) Country Club Records (CCR-015)

EPs:

- The Times Square (2001) Country Club Records (CCR-001)
- The Sicilian Clan (2004) Country Club Records (CCR-004)
- The Adventures of Prince Achmed (2016) Country Club Records (CCR-007)
- Night of the Living Dead (2016) Country Club Records (CCR-008)
