= Taking the World by Donkey =

Studio album by the Rugburns
- Released: October 31, 1995
- Label: Priority
- Producers: Robert Duffey, the Rugburns

The Rugburns chronology
Mommy I'm Sorry EP (1995)	Taking the World by Donkey (1995)

Taking the World by Donkey is an album by the American band the Rugburns, released October 31, 1995. It was their final album, due to Steve Poltz's decision to pursue a solo career. It was a commercial failure.

The album's first single was "War". The album title is a reference to the 13-year journey it took the band to sign with a major label.

== Production ==
Jewel cowrote "Old Lover's House", on which she also sang. The album contains two unlisted tracks.

== Critical reception ==
Professional ratings
Review scores
Source	Rating
AllMusic	3/5 stars
The Encyclopedia of Popular Music	3/5 stars
The Indianapolis Star	2.5/4 stars
MusicHound Rock: The Essential Album Guide	3/5 stars

The Colorado Springs Gazette-Telegraph deemed the album " jangly, twangy, hook-filled and quite compelling." The Los Angeles Times concluded that "Poltz is one of the few rock writers who can be funny and sad in the same song... Most compelling, however, is 'The Ballad of Tommy & Marla', a song about a couple of speed freaks who lived unhappily ever after." The Tulsa World labeled Taking the World by Donkey "the Knack with a sharper sense of humor, cooler guitar licks and no hope of success."

The Dayton Daily News noted that "Suburbia" and "War" "filter social commentary through sarcastic humor." The Indianapolis Star concluded that, "obscured in the humor and silliness is that the Rugburns actually are a talented, tight band capable of many styles... 'War' is a rough rocker, like Country Joe and the Fish gone to hell." The San Diego Union-Tribune complained that "their folk-based alternative rock and Poltz's nasal vocals display limited range."

AllMusic wrote that "each tune feels upbeat and drenched in California sunshine, but the subject matter underneath the pop exterior usually revolves around the themes of uncaring women and disillusionment along the same vein that Too Much Joy experimented with in the '80s."

== Track listing ==
No.	Title	Length
1.	"'til the Next Day Comes"
2.	"War"
3.	"The Ballad of Tommy & Marla"
4.	"Now's Not the Right Time for Love"
5.	"You're So Busy (La la La)"
6.	"Better Be Careful"
7.	"Old Lover's House"
8.	"Tree Hugger"
9.	"The Girl with the Wandering Eye"
10.	"Mama"
11.	"Lockjaw"
12.	"Suburbia"
13.	"Pile On the Hangover"
14.	"Dirty"
15.	"Morning Song"
