= Krimzen =

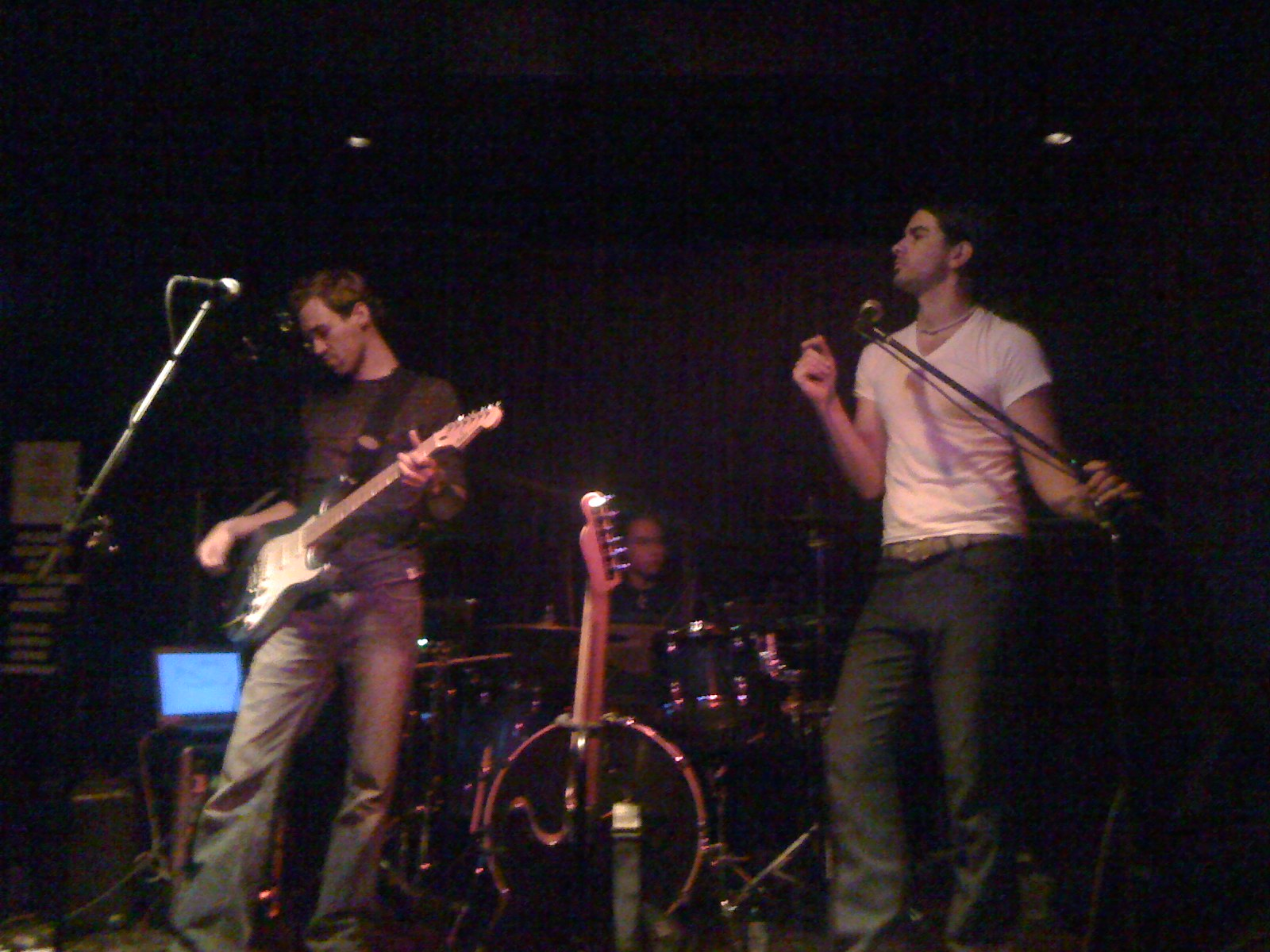

Background information
- Origin: Hollywood, California
- Genres: Rock, alternative rock, modern
- Years active: 2003–present
- Label: Schmusic Productions
- Members: Christopher Snyder; Michael Edwards
- Website: www.standinginwaves.com

The American rock band Krimzen, was formed in 2003 by singer-songwriter Christopher Snyder in Hollywood, California.

The band has had various musicians, notability Jason Land (guitarist), Dave Weiner (guitarist - for Steve Vai), and Steve Wilson (drummer) who have all at one time or another performed with Krimzen on stage and or in studio. Snyder is the lead singer.

In 2005, Snyder and Edwards' first collection of songs titled "Initial Contact" (later released in 2007 under the title Nezvanova) topped college radio charts. This, along with growing attention from the public and music industry, made way for the band to tour and support their first official album Nezvanova (which means - "nameless nobodies"). This gained Krimzen additions to college radio charts, and their music featured on network television.

From 2005 to the summer of 2009, the band toured nationally and played at some of Hollywood's most iconic clubs, such as Whisky a Go Go, The Cat Club, and the Rainbow Room, as well as, the House of Blues in Las Vegas.

Guitarist Michael Edwards on stage at the House of Blues, in Las Vegas 2008.

Currently Krimzen are back in the studio developing and recording songs for their second album "Hands on Display", which will be official release this coming summer.

== Discography ==
Lead singer Christopher Snyder on stage in Fresno, California (2009)

- Nezvanova (2007)
- Hands on Display (2010)

== Awards and nominations ==
In 2004, Michael Edwards played guitar on the popular car commercial "Car Carrier" by Chevrolet, which was directed by Michael Bay, and later won the AICP Award - Honoring Excellence In Music Arrangement.
2005
The band's first official album Nezvanova was rated number 11 on the top 15 chart for 2005 at WMHB Waterville, ME.

== In other media ==
Krimzen was featured in Rolling Stone magazine (Issue 995, March 9, 2006).

"Light of Dawn" was featured on L.A. Forensics (episode # 103) "Close Encounter" on TrueTV.
