= Chris Eskola =

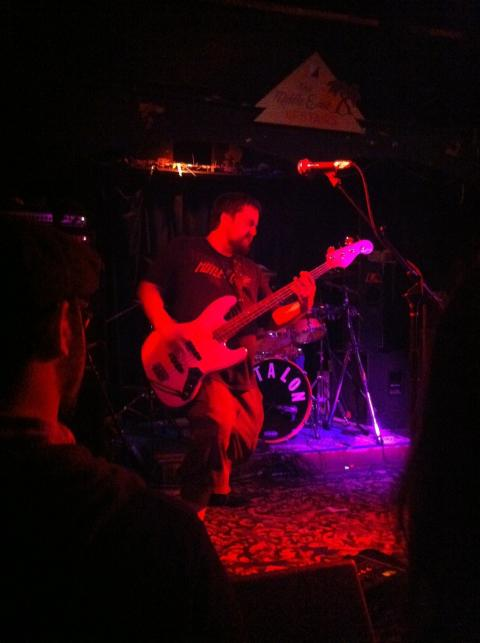
- Chris Eskola performing with Matalon at the Middle East Upstairs in Cambridge, Massachusetts

Background information
- Birth name: Christopher James Eskola
- Born: February 23, 1976 (age 49); Waltham, Massachusetts, U.S.
- Origin: Boston, Massachusetts, United States
- Genres: Heavy metal, hard rock, alternative rock, industrial, experimental rock, punk, ska, hardcore
- Occupation(s): Musician, performer
- Instrument(s): bass guitar, trombone, backing vocals
- Years active: 1988–present

Chris Eskola (born February 23, 1976) is musician from Boston, Massachusetts, locally known as a bassist who has performed with a number of hard rock, metal, punk, and experimental bands in the Boston area. Chris briefly attended Berklee in the late 1990s, and plays trombone in addition to the bass. He is currently the bassist for Matalon (with brothers Scott Matalon on guitar, and Craig Matalon on the drums) and Face of the Sun (with Brian Viglione of The Dresden Dolls, Ron Arra Jr. and Scott Matalon.)

== Early musical roots ==
Eskola was born in Waltham, Massachusetts, but grew up in Westbrook, Connecticut. He started playing trombone at the age of 12 and eventually became the section leader of his high school's concert band and jazz/rock ensemble. At 14, a few of Chris' classmates had started a metal band and needed a bassist. Chris asked his father for a bass and an amp for Christmas and got his wish. This band became known as Glass Eyed Smash. and Chris was their bassist through high school. Chris also played for about a year with a local grunge band by the colorful name of Kermit Bloomgarden.

== Berklee, Chris Opperman, Choke Puppy ==
Chris graduated from high school in June 1995. That fall, he moved to Boston to attend Berklee College of Music where he studied Music Business/Management and Film Scoring, while improving his abilities on bass guitar and trombone. While at Berklee, Chris would perform with fellow Berklee musician Chris Opperman and played trombone on his debut album Oppy Music, Vol. I: Purple, Crayon (1998), which was produced by former Frank Zappa guitarist, and current guitarist for Dethklok, Mike Keneally. In his personal blog, Keneally quipped, "I am happy to claim responsibility for making Chris Eskola overdub three trombones on the last repeat of the melody—I love that texture to death. Since I have yet to work with horns on my own albums, it was great fun to mess around with them on this album." Chris joined this project on stage for about a dozen shows around the Boston area, including one at the Boston ICA and an appearance in San Diego at Nonkerstock, which was fan created fanfest for Mike Keneally, culminating in an epic performance by his band, Beer for Dolphins.

While at Berklee, Chris would also play trombone with punk/ska/hardcore band Choke Puppy on their album Don't Stop Now and later go on to perform a number of shows with them on bass, including a spot on the Vans' Warped Tour in 1998.

Since leaving Berklee in 1999, Chris has been a stalwart in the local Boston music scene.

== Pivot, Alchemilla, Pipe ==
Soon after college, Choke Puppy quickly disbanded due to turmoil within the band and Opperman relocated to Los Angeles, leaving Chris in search of a new musical project. In 2000, he teamed up with a local industrial metal project known as Pivot, who had been long searching for a bassist, and whom Chris had been friends with since Berklee. Pivot would play numerous shows around the Boston area, playing with local metal bands such as death metal band Kevorkian, female-fronted power metal band Mancain, and digital hardcore act Dummyplug Conspiracy. In 2000, Pivot released a seven-song EP titled Natural Selection, featuring two remixes by Dummyplug Conspiracy and local DJ, Technology Scum. In 2002, in somewhat of a double deja vu situation, Pivot disbanded, also due to inner turmoil; and drummer Pete Pace and Singer/programmer Hal Berkstresser moved to Los Angeles. Pace eventually joined Los Angeles dark wave pioneers London After Midnight and Hal became bassist for the LA power metal band, Devolved.

Eager to be on stage, Chris spent the next few years playing with the female-fronted alternative rockers Alchemilla; and Central Massachusetts' hard rock powerhouse Pipe. Chris didn't record with Alchemilla, but released a three-song EP titled The Lost EP with Pipe.

== The Newtz ==
In 2005, while rocking out around the Boston and Central Massachusetts area with Pipe, Chris became friends with Ron Arra Jr., who was at the time screaming through a kid's toy megaphone for the local experimental psyco-metal ward escapees, My First Handgun, and decided that they both had similar tastes in music, and a hunger to play music on their own terms, without the stresses of conforming to a particular style. With that, Ron would pick up a guitar and they would start writing. The unique sound (described best as "experimental sludge-metal meets 90s alternative meets old school Metallica/Megadeth") that developed quickly developed its own identity, and they decided it was time to find a drummer. One day while getting a sandwich at a local bagel shop, Ron and Chris met Dave Coniglio, who was also playing drums for a local jazz/funk project known as Greesome, and found that he was looking to play some heavier music, and also just wanted to play the way he wanted. They invited him over to jam and immediately knew that it was a match, and the Newtz were born.

About a year after the Newtz' inception, Coniglio decided to leave the band to relocate to Portland, Oregon, and the Newtz, soon thereafter, drafted Kyle "Thor" Rasmussen (Current Drummer for Whitey and Phantom Glue). Thor's love of powerful sludge, doom, and thrash (As well as his massive height and wingspan) was just the fuel the Newtz needed to attack the ears of its listeners around Massachusetts while sharing the stage with bands like We're All Gonna Die, Clouds, Black Pyramid, Muss, and The Proselyte. In August 2007, at a performance in the front room of the Paradise Rock Club, Arra's good friend, Dave Hughes (who was, at the time, the touring sound engineer for The Dresden Dolls), brought along Dolls' drummer, Brian Viglione, and he and Ron became good friends. This friendship eventually evolved into the project Face of the Sun. Arra and Viglione initially recorded a three-song demo titled Ghosts Vol zero from which the Newtz would occasionally perform the song, The Sun and the Moon. In the winter of 2008, Dave Henriquez of the band, Hourcast joined the Newtz for a couple shows.

But, like all good things, the Newtz eventually passed. In February 2009, after playing what would be their last show at Church of Boston, musical differences and conflicting schedules got the best of the Newtz and the band broke up. During their four years as a band, the Newtz entered the studio on a handful of occurrences, but only demo material was created, although two songs from their 1st demo appeared on The Spinnin' Season Vol. 1 from Blastermonkey Entertainment. Among the slew of talented bands that the Newtz would share the stage with, two bands worked into Eskola's future. One was Allston Neo Classic Rockers Monolith (who would eventually be known as Matalon, at the time featuring Scott and Craig Matalon, guitarist Daanen Krouth of the band, The Luxury, and Lenny Hart). The other was an earlier version of the band Whitey (before Rasmussen or Eskola became involved).

== Matalon ==
Again on the musical 'rebound,' Eskola was again in search of a new project. Around the same time, Monolith, who had shared the stage multiple times with the Newtz (and had since replaced Krouth with guitarist, Jay Gardner of local college rock band, Highgate) had recently found itself in need of a new bassist. Eager to keep making music, Chris got together to jam with Monolith and found himself playing his 1st show with them a month later (April 2009). after a few gigs, the band decided to change its name, and they chose to use Scott and Craig's last name, Matalon. Over the next few months, they would play a handful of shows, including a spot on the 2009 Boston Freedom Rally (9/19/2009) on the Stingray Body Art 2nd stage, as well as the 2010 Rock the Village Music and Style Show (4/15/2010) at Harpers Ferry in Allston, MA. (Now known as the Brighton Music Hall) The band also recorded a three-song demo and create a video for the song Runnin From Jesus in the summer of 2009. An instrumental version of the song Time was used for the opening and closing moments of the sports reality show, Boston Boxing: Team Training on NESN.

Soon after 'RTVM&SS,' Matalon parted ways with Gardner, citing creative differences. This was a tough decision for the Chris and the brothers, as Gardner was considered a great musician and soloist and a good friend to the rest of the band members, "He just had a vision that was different than the rest of ours." With a handful of gigs already scheduled for the next few months (including the Stingray Body Art fifth anniversary party, also at Harpers Ferry, and the 2010 Boston Freedom Rally), Matalon scrambled to seal up a lot of the gaps left by Gardner's absence and power on, with the intention of eventually finding a replacement for Jay. To this day, Matalon remains a three-piece with Eskola on bass, Scott on guitar and vocals, and Craig on drums. They're currently working on a full-length recording and playing shows around the greater Boston area.

== Face of the Sun ==
In August 2007, the Newtz performed a show in the front-room of the Paradise Rock Club. A good friend of Ron's by the name of Dave Hughes (who was, at the time, the touring sound engineer for The Dresden Dolls), brought along Dolls' drummer, Brian Viglione, and he and Ron became good friends. Soon, Arra and Viglione found themselves playing an unrehearsed set at a friends party, where they realized that they shared a creative spark that needed to be harnessed (much to the delight of the other party goers) The two soon reunited in a Cambridge, Massachusetts, rehearsal space to record a few freestyle jams. Brian soon found himself in a recording studio to lay down drum tracks with Nine Inch Nails for two tracks that were included on the double album Ghosts I–IV. Meanwhile, Ron was overdubbing vocals, more guitars, and had petitioned Eskola to lay down some bass lines. The three-song demo that emerged was released under the name Ghosts Vol zero.

Some time went by, and in February 2009, the Newtz disbanded. Eskola joined Matalon, and also lent his bass to Boston Thrash/Punk Legends, deadlikedeath. Ron, also eager to make more music, soon contacted Brian, and the two decided that it was time to book some studio time and try to hash out a full-length recording. Producer Martin Bisi was enlisted in August 2009, and they entered his Brooklyn studio to see what would happen. Ron came in with a few ideas, gave Brian a few cues, and over the course of a weekend, they captured a few hours of freestyle drum tracks. Ron took these recordings back home to Boston, and over the next few months (again with the help of Eskola, now a full-time member) transformed these tracks into an epic ten-song recording. The trio decided on a name, and in September 2010 they released their self-titled album under the name, Face of the Sun. That fall, the band went on to record a video for the song Earthquake, which was featured in the 2011 Glovebox Film Festival where it was nominated for a Golden Glovie award for best Music Video. The Fight was used in Boston vs the World, a sports reality show on NESN, which documents a series of Boxing matches in the Boston area.

During this time, Eskola would also find himself splitting his time with local blues metal pioneers, Whitey, with which Kyle Rasmussen was now playing drums, and Adam Muss from the band Muss was now spitting guitar duties with guitarist/vocalist and founder Randy Newman (former bassist of Glazed Baby)

With the net buzzing over this innovative new project, FOTS decided in early 2011 that it's now time for the project to be translated for the stage. The band summoned the guitar skills of Scott Matalon, and over the next few months the four piece developed their performance for their live debut. The band booked two shows for the debut. The first was on Friday, May 13, 2011, at the Magic Room Gallery in Brighton, Massachusetts, and the second was on Sunday, May 15 at Pianos in Manhattan's Lower East Side,. The band invited long-time friends Whitey to support them both nights, and Brooklyn Cloud Rock favorites, Papertwin played at the New York City show. Both evenings were met with excited, near capacity crowds who were treated with a surprisingly high energy debut performance from a new band with a new approach to making noise. FOTS currently has plans to start the next 'Phase of the Sun' this summer with another round of performances and another visit to the studio.

== Discography ==
- Face of the Sun by Face of the Sun (2010)
- Angry Tree EP by deadlikedeath (2010)
- Live @ O'Brien's by deadlikedeath (2010)
- Ghosts Vol zero by Ghosts Vol zero (future Face of the Sun; 2009)
- The Lost EP by Pipe (2005)
- Natural Selection by Pivot (2000)
- Oppy Music, Vol. I: Purple, Crayon by Chris Opperman and the Random Factor (1998) trombone
- Don't Stop Now by Choke Puppy (1998) trombone

== Current projects ==
- Matalon (2009–present)

== Past projects ==
- Face of the Sun (2010–2011)
- Whitey (2010)
- deadlikedeath (2009–2010)
- the Newtz (2005–2009)
- Pipe (2004–2006)
- Alchemilla (2002–2004)
- Pivot (2000–2002)
- Chris Opperman (1998–2000) trombone
- Choke Puppy (1997–2000) bass & trombone
