= One Left Shoe =

Studio album by Steve Poltz
- Released: 1998
- Studio: Ocean Way
- Label: Mercury
- Producer: J. Steven Soles

Steve Poltz chronology
One Left Shoe (1998)	Live at Largo (2000)

One Left Shoe is the solo debut album by the American musician Steve Poltz, released in 1998. The first single was "Silver Lining". Poltz, at the time, expected to record again with the Rugburns, and considered One Left Shoe to be a "sensitive" folk excursion.

Poltz promoted the album by playing shows with, among others, Richard X. Heyman and Lisa Loeb. He also took part in the "Frasier Fair" tour (so named by Rufus Wainwright), with John Doe, Pete Droge, and Glen Phillips.

== Production ==
Recorded in 15 days, the album was produced by J. Steven Soles. Four of its songs were cowritten by Jewel, who also provided backing vocals. Jim Keltner, Leland Sklar, Benmont Tench, and the Mighty Mighty Bosstones' horn section were among the musicians who played on One Left Shoe. Jimmie Haskell arranged the strings; Van Dyke Parks also contributed during the recording sessions.

"Forbidden Fruit" is about an interaction with a prostitute. "I Thought I Saw You Last Night" was inspired by the death of a friend.

== Critical reception ==
Professional ratings
Review scores
Source	Rating
AllMusic	4/5 stars
The Indianapolis Star	2/4 stars
Los Angeles Daily News	3/4 stars
Los Angeles Times	A
MusicHound Rock: The Essential Album Guide	4/5 stars
The Province	2.5/4 stars
Rolling Stone	3.5/5 stars
Telegraph-Journal	3.5/4 stars
Toronto Sun	3/5 stars

Salon determined that, "particularly when it wanders off the straight folkie path, One Left Shoe sounds better than it reads." The Los Angeles Daily News called the album "a gentle and amusing acoustic collection that avoids the furrowed-brow introspection of similar singer-songwriter debuts." The Province labeled it "a reflective, folksy singer-writer album of quiet charm and some sleepiness."

The Washington Post stated that "Poltz wisely sticks to his strengths: pleasant, Randy Newman-ish melodies and whimsical delivery." The Telegraph-Journal advised: "Think Jackson Browne with the seventies sincerity turfed out, replaced by nineties irony." The Indianapolis Star deemed the album "pleasant, mostly earnest, competently performed and ultimately unmemorable." The New Yorker considered it to be "an unexpectedly mature collection of forlorn ballads."

AllMusic wrote that "Poltz still sounds a little unsure of himself in places on One Left Shoe, but on the whole, it's a promising debut."

== Track listing ==
No.	Title	Length
1.	"Look to the East"
2.	"Good Morning (Waking Up with You)"
3.	"Krikor's Waltz"
4.	"Silver Lining"
5.	"Forbidden Fruit"
6.	"Salvation Song"
7.	"Impala"
8.	"One Left Shoe"
9.	"I Thought I Saw You Last Night"
10.	"Everything About You"
11.	"Leavin' Again"
12.	"The Great Mystery"
13.	"Broken Hearts and Painted Nails"
14.	"Kicking Distance"
15.	"Beautiful Day"
