= Modern Primitives =

Modern Primitives may refer to:

- Modern primitive, a person in modern society who engages in body modification with ritual purpose
- Modern Primitive (album), a 2016 studio album by Steve Vai
- Modern Primitives (book), a 1989 book by V. Vale and Andrea Juno
- "Modern Primitives" (The Grim Adventures of Billy & Mandy), episode 4a of season 5 (2006)

== See also ==
- Modernist Primitivism, a development in aesthetics of primitivism in visual arts
