= Coolidge Corner Theatre =

Nonprofit cinema in Massachusetts, US

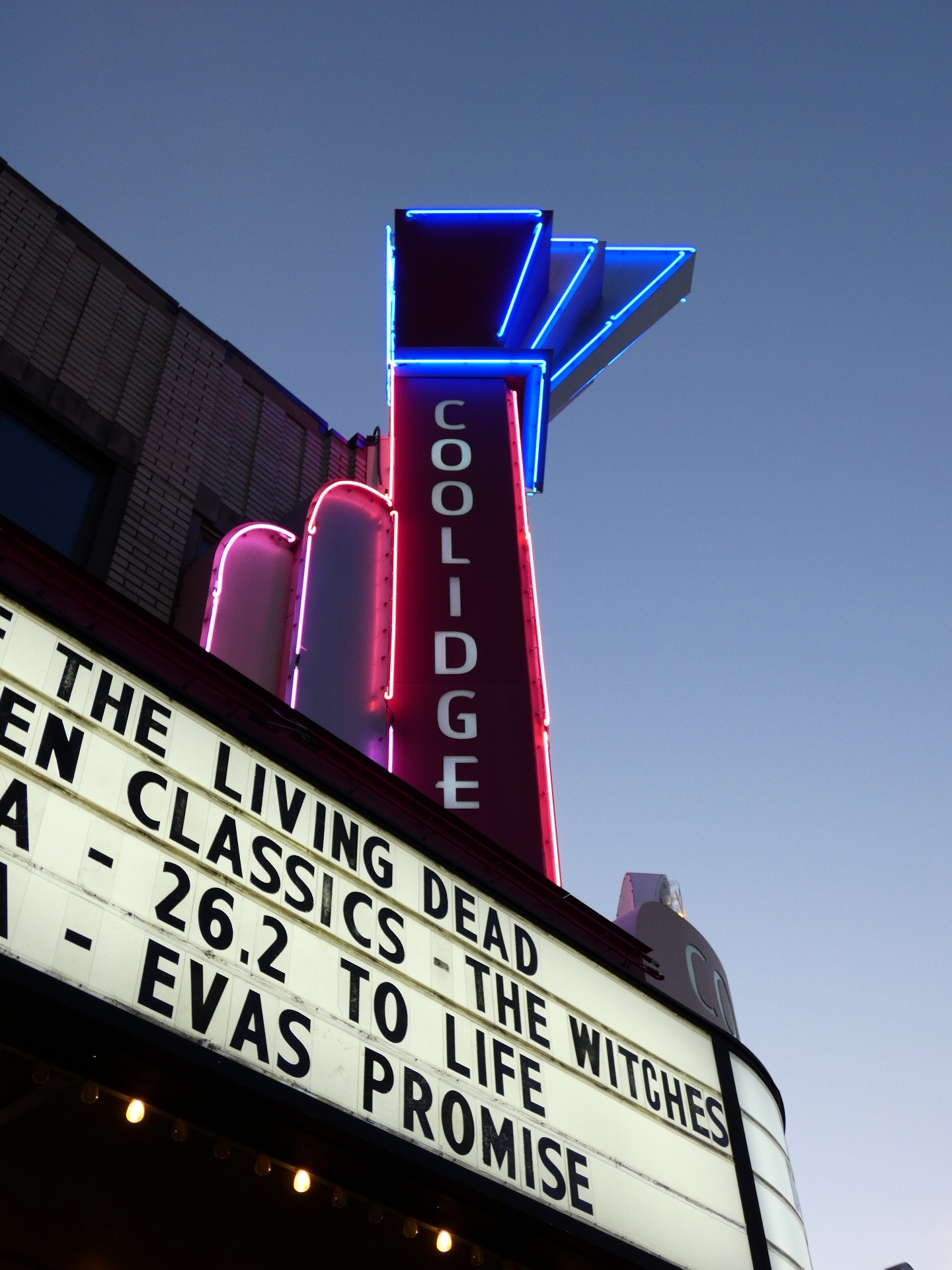
- Coolidge Corner Theatre marquee in 2023
- Interactive map of Coolidge Corner Theatre
- Address: 290 Harvard Street; Brookline, Massachusetts; United States
- Coordinates: 42°20′33″N 71°07′21″W
- Operator: Coolidge Corner Theatre Foundation
- Type: Non-profit
- Current use: In Operation

Construction
- Opened: 30 December 1933

Website
- www.coolidge.org

Coolidge Corner Theatre is a nonprofit, independent cinema and community cultural center in the Coolidge Corner section of Brookline, Massachusetts, specializing in international, documentary, animated, and independent film selections, series, classes, and seminars.

== History ==
Coolidge Corner Theatre was built as a Universalist church in 1906 and was redesigned as an Art Deco movie palace in 1933 as the community's first movie theater. The theater opened on December 30, 1933 with its first film being a Disney short film. Originally the theater only had one screen but was later divided into two and then four, and then expanded to six.

By 1988, the theatre faced increased competition due to VCR sales and shifts in entertainment consumption. When developer Jonathan Davis expressed interest in demolishing the theatre and repurposing the property as commercial space, a group from the Brookline community started a grassroots campaign to save the theatre.

David Kleiler, a film professor at Babson College, led the movement, called "Friends of the Coolidge," which later transformed into the Coolidge Corner Theatre Foundation, a nonprofit dedicated to the theatre's preservation. This foundation played a role in securing the theater's recognition as a historic site, temporarily preventing potential redevelopment.

In 1989, the foundation attempted to raise the necessary $2.6 million to purchase the theatre, but faced fundraising shortfalls. In response, four hundred local residents gathered in a peaceful demonstration, locking arms and forming a human chain around the theatre. Harold Brown, a realtor and Brookline resident who had loved the Coolidge in his youth, and his Hamilton Charitable Foundation emerged, proposed the purchase of the theatre and a 99-year lease to the Coolidge Foundation. On November 8, 1989, Kleiler cut a celluloid ribbon and the theatre reopened its doors with the marquee reading, "WE DID IT - ON WITH THE SHOW." Kleiler remained the theatre's programming director until 1993.

Comedian and Brookline, Massachusetts native John Hodgman worked at the Coolidge Corner Theatre in his youth.

Academy Award-winning actor Julianne Moore saw Eraserhead at the Coolidge Corner Theatre and credits the experience as one of her key inspirations to pursue acting.

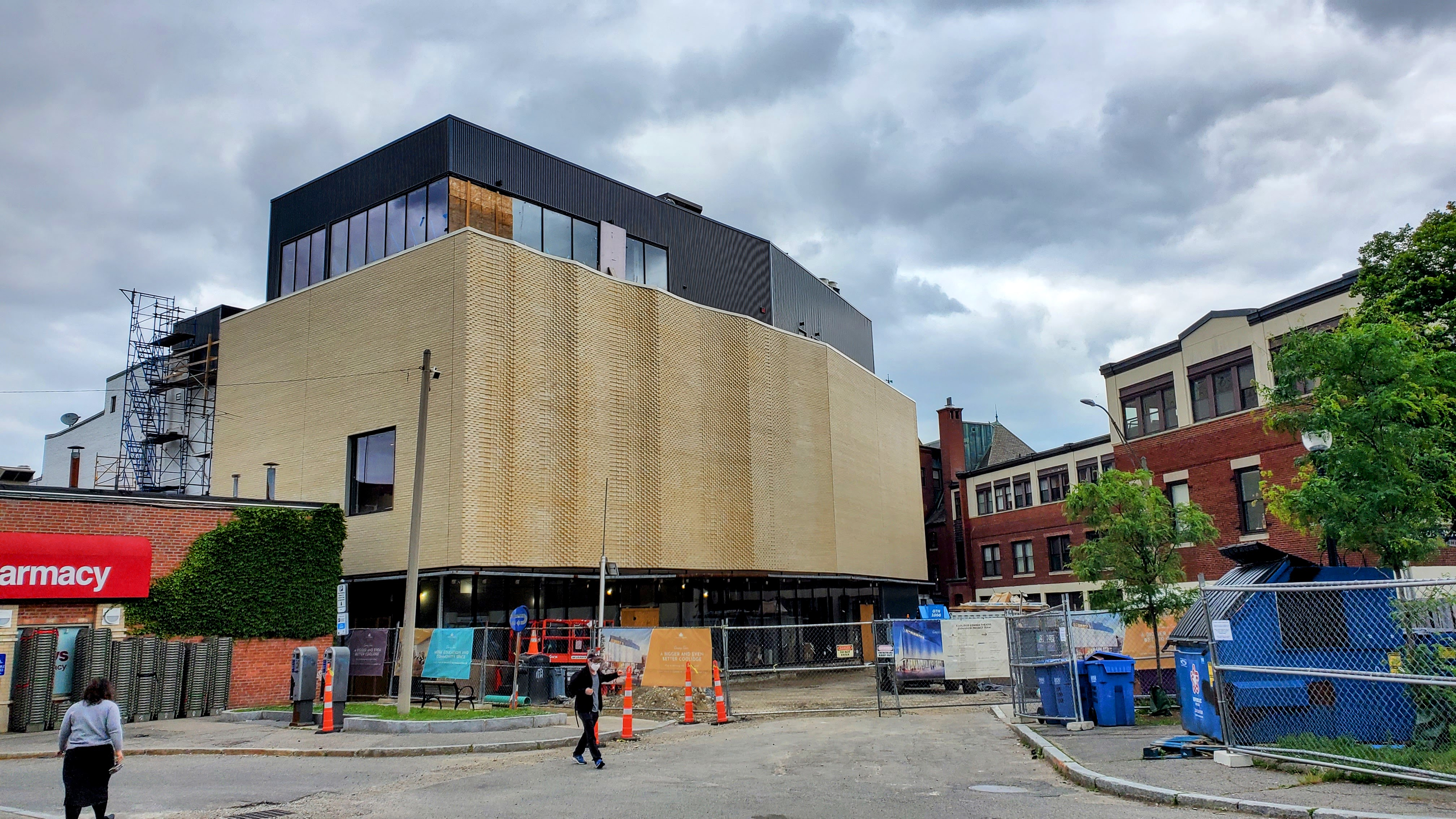
Back of the theater expansion in summer 2023

In November 2021, the Coolidge Foundation broke ground on an expansion of the theatre, which added 14,000 square feet to its existing structure. The $12.5 million expansion, "The Campaign for the Coolidge," designed by Höweler + Yoon, features two state-of-the-art theaters, a 60-seat Community Education and Engagement Center, a media library for films and Coolidge merchandise, and enhanced accessibility features. Donors included a $1 million donation from The Trust Family Foundation. The expansion opened on March 27, 2024.

On May 29, 2024, Coolidge Corner Theatre staff announced their plans to unionize, citing "the need for a more transparent, equitable, and supportive workplace" as the reasoning behind these efforts. On June 6, 2024, it was announced that employers of the Coolidge Corner Theatre will voluntarily recognize the union.

== Coolidge Award ==
The Coolidge Award annually recognizes a film artist who “advances the spirit of original and challenging cinema.’’ Recipients of this venue's annual Coolidge Award include:

- 2005: Vittorio Storaro
- 2006: Meryl Streep
- 2010: Jonathan Demme
- 2012: Viggo Mortensen
- 2013: Thelma Schoonmaker
- 2016: Jane Fonda
- 2017: Werner Herzog
- 2018: Michael Douglas
- 2019: Julianne Moore
- 2023: Liv Ullmann
- 2023: Ruth E. Carter
- 2024: John Waters
- 2025: Ethan Hawke

== Coolidge Breakthrough Artist Award ==
Created in 2023, the Coolidge Breakthrough Artist Award recognizes emerging voices in film and spotlights the next generation of young film artists. Recipients include:

- 2023: Elegance Bratton
- 2024: Jane Schoenbrun
- 2025: Payal Kapadia
- 2026: Harry Lighton

== Images ==
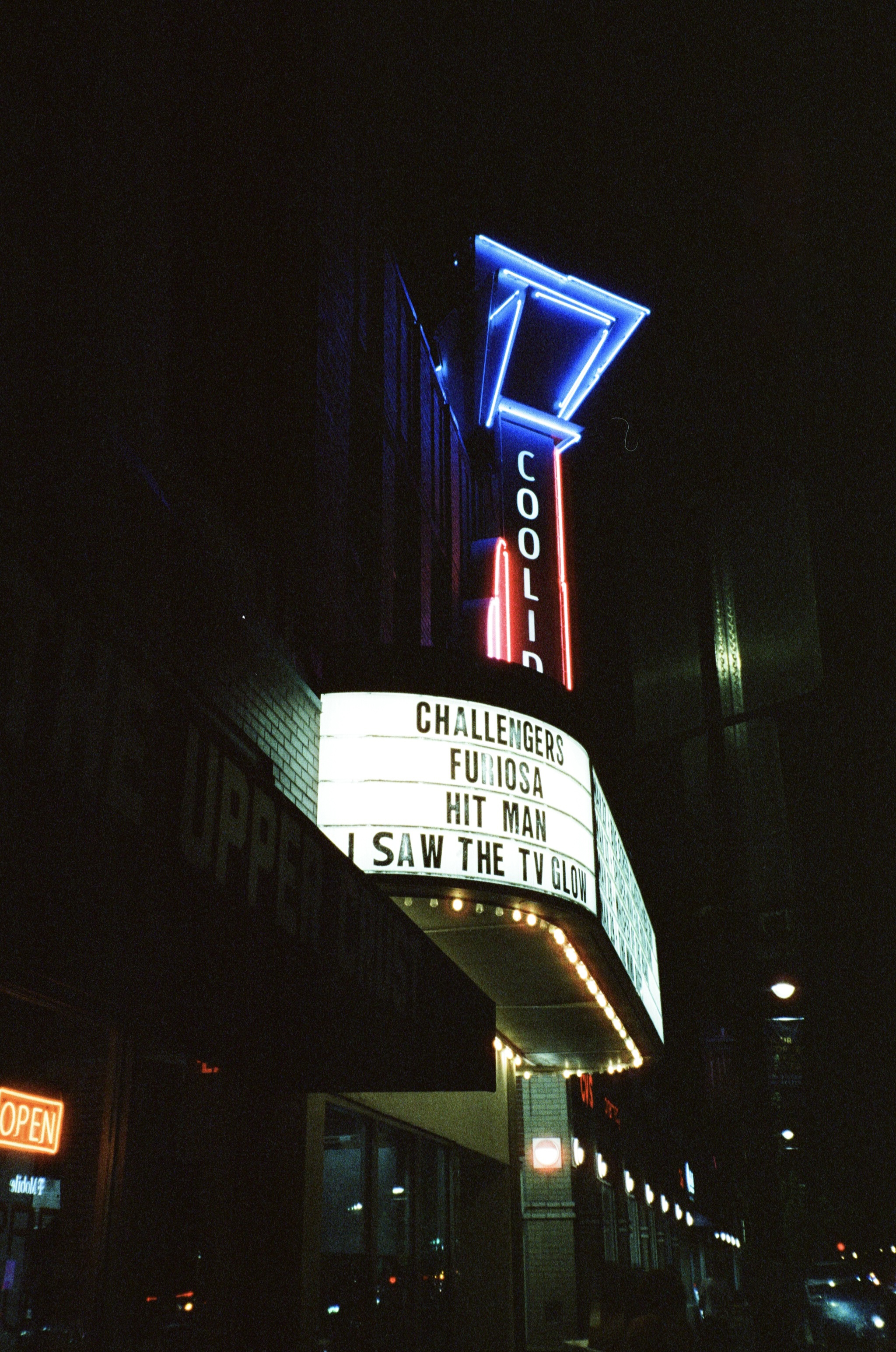
Coolidge Corner Theatre Marquee in 2024.

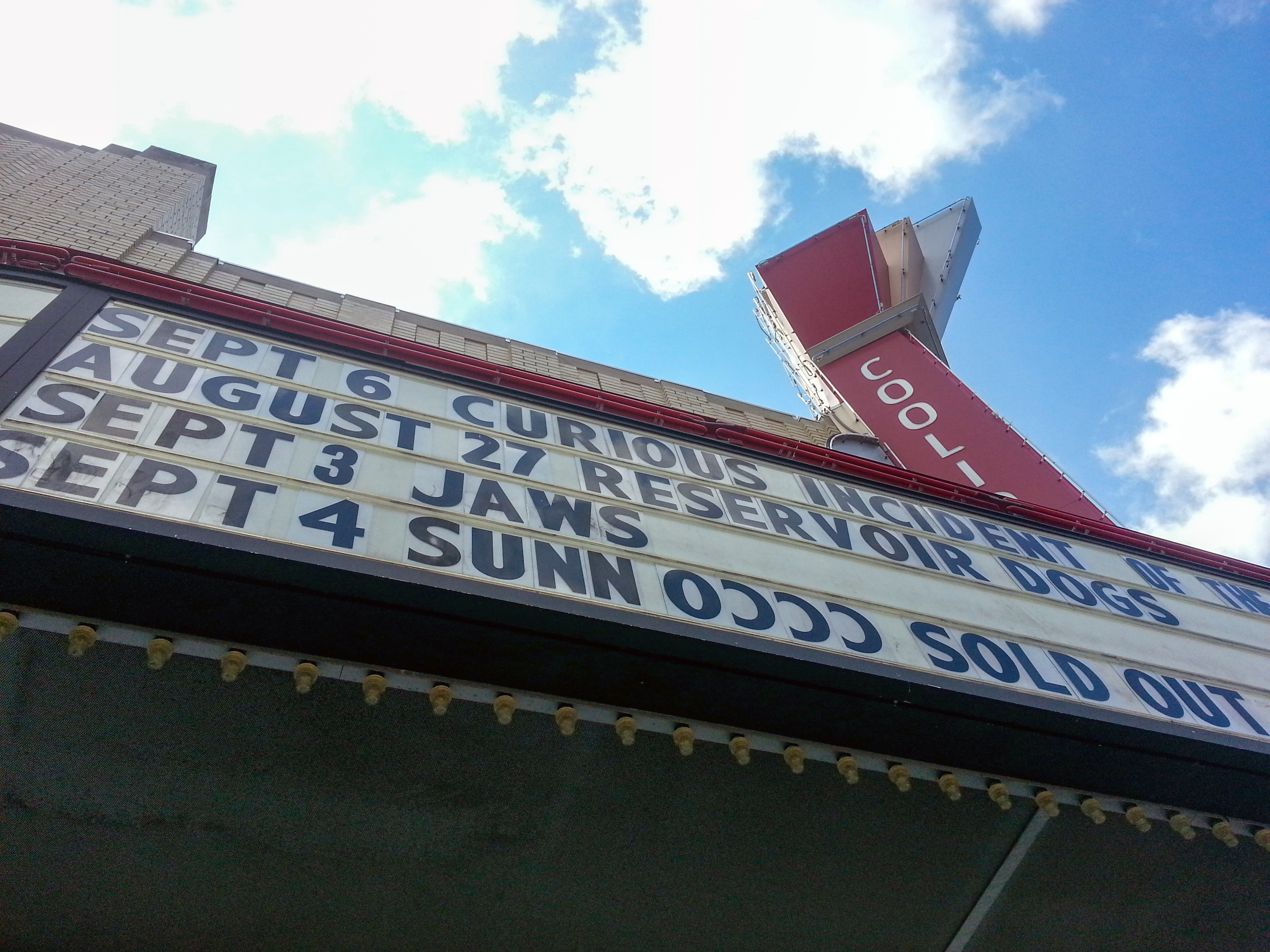
The theater hosts some non-film programming, such as Sunn O))) in 2012.

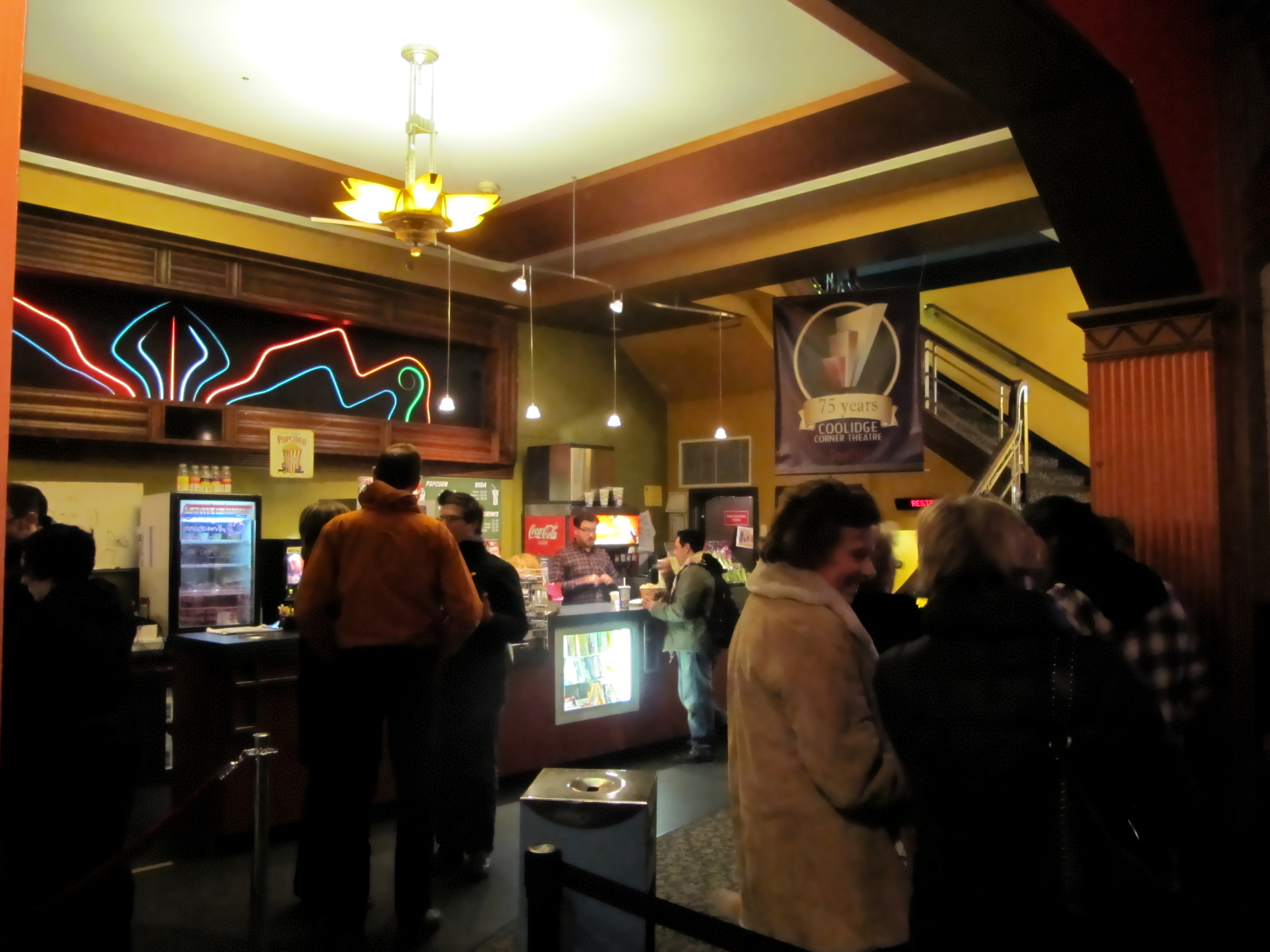
Coolidge Corner Theatre lobby with Art Deco neon

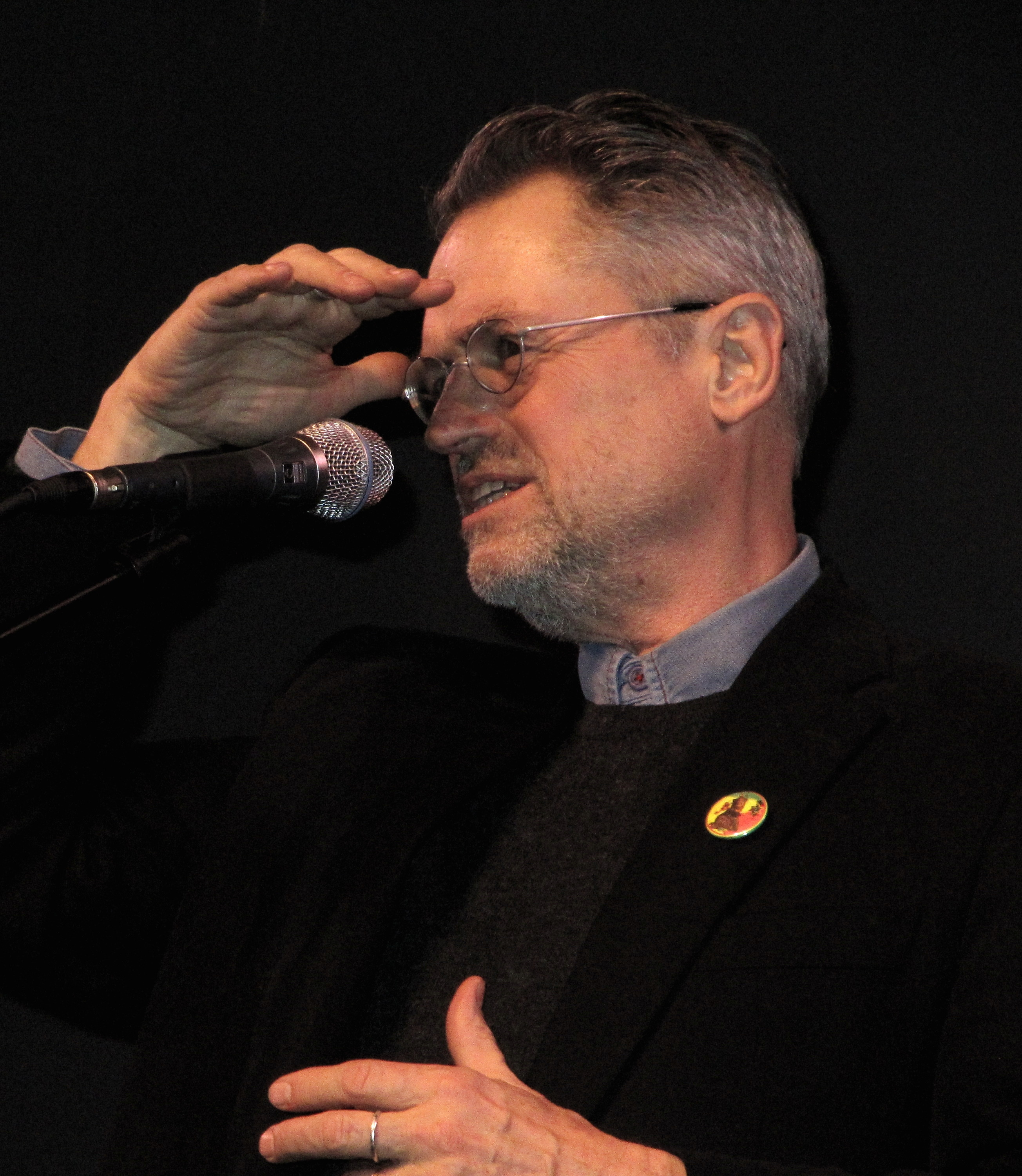
Coolidge Award recipient Jonathan Demme at Coolidge Corner Theatre in 2010

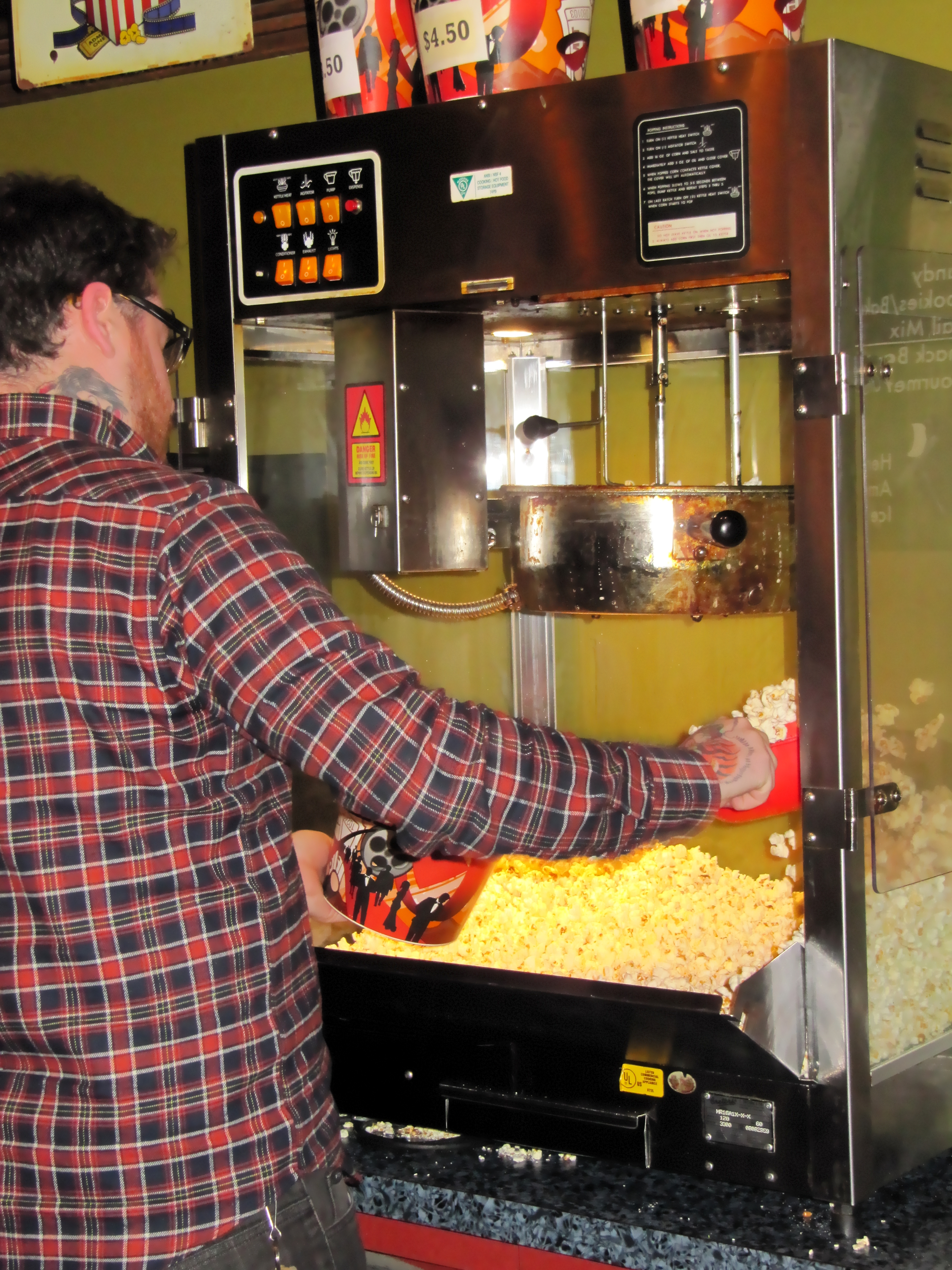
Popcorn being served in Coolidge Corner Theatre lobby

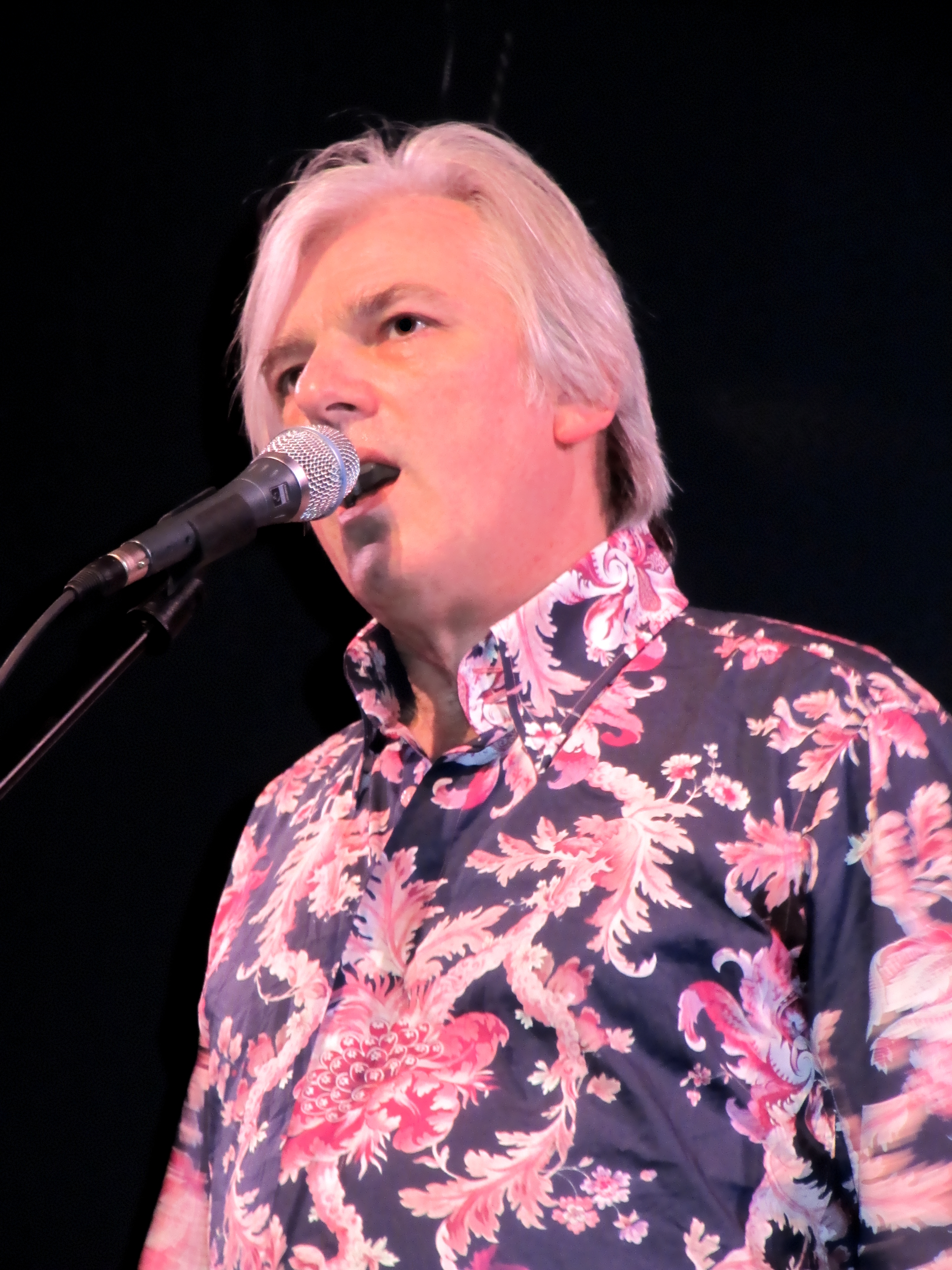
Robyn Hitchcock at Coolidge Corner Theatre in 2010

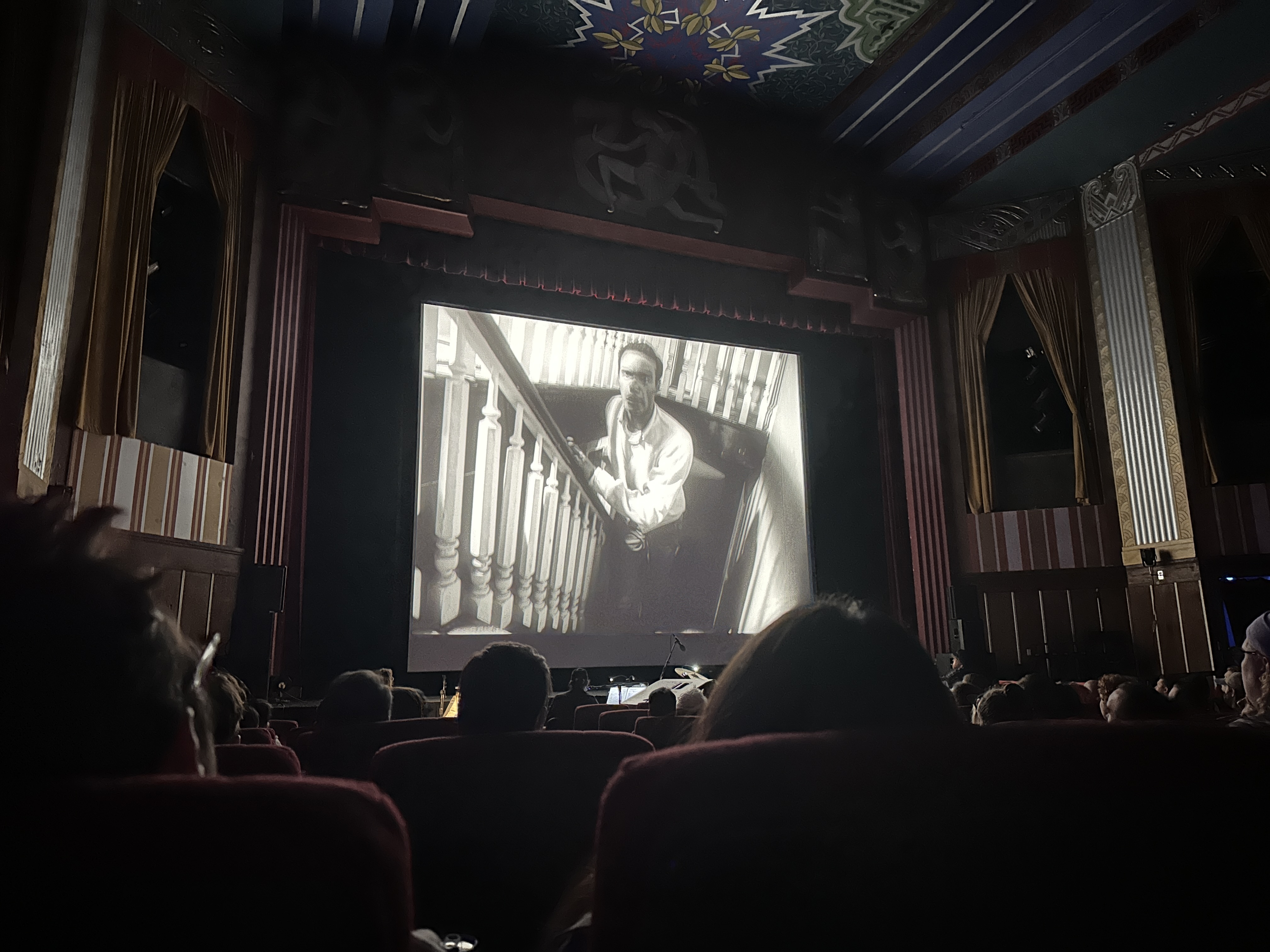
A screening of Night of the Living Dead on October 2, 2023 with a live score by the Morricone Youth.
