= Oppy Music, Vol. I: Purple, Crayon =

OppyMusic

Studio album by Chris Opperman and the Random Factor
- Released: September 7, 2010

Oppy Music, Vol. I: Purple, Crayon is the Debut Album by Chris Opperman and the Random Factor

"Can you imagine a silken scarf, studded with turquoise Necco wafers? Opperman's music starts on the 'and of 2.' If you think you understand it, you're wrong. There's this weird little plot of land occupying a hitherto unexplored region between rock, jazz, contemporary classical, and some weird fucking shit nobody can explain. There's Opperman. I don't know if you'll ever get there, but Opperman'll let you watch."

== Credits ==
Geoff Sykes Mastering
Steve Revilak Engineer
Tanya Smith, Model
Atticus Wolrab Artwork, Art Realization
Chris Opperman Piano, Chimes, Vocals, Vibraslap, Scenery, Piano (Grand), Photography, Voices, Programming, Trumpet
Tricia Williams Chimes, Orchestra Bells, Orchestral Bells, Shaker, Cymbals, Marimba
Brian O'Connell Bass, Chapman Stick, Guitar (Bass)
James Klewin Guitar, Guitar (Rhythm), Soloist, Wah Wah Guitar
Ty Paulsen Drums, Drums (Snare)
Joe Conley Lead & Stunt Guitar
Erica Rae Vocals (Background), Soprano (Vocal)
Wesley Livingston Vocals (Background)
Cynthia Levinson Alto, Vocals (Background), Alto (Vocals)
Satu Carlsten Alto, Alto (Vocals), Vocals (Background)
Tim Franklin, Bass (Vocal), Tenor (Vocal), Vocals (Background)
Amy Millette Vocals (Background), Voices
Brandon Hunt, Sax (Tenor)
Chris Eskola Trombone
Mark BoichSax (Alto)
C.J. DeAngelus Sax (Baritone)
Jeff Forrest Sound Effects, Voices, Engineer, Mixing
Mike Keneally Piano (Electric), Sound Effects, Vocals (Background), Voices, Noise, Producer, Wood Block, Scenery

== Track listing ==
1. Sophia's Dream (Vs. Reality) (8:31)
2. Shipped to the Sky (4:16)
3. The 22nd Overture (9:20)
4. Snot Woman: Act I, Scene 4 (4:05)
5. The Park Beach Canal (1:38)
6. Sharel's Lullabye I (1:17)
7. Ain't Got No Beef (7:38)
8. Lincoln, Lincoln (:27)
9. Beware of the Random Factor (4:29)
10. The Day Big Bird Turned Blue (:51)
11. Send Your Money (5:38)
12. Sharel's Lullabye II (5:26)
