= Modern Primitive (album) =

Studio album by Steve Vai
- Released: June 24, 2016
- Studio: Stucco Blue Studios
- Length: 70:14
- Label: Epic
- Producer: Steve Vai

Steve Vai chronology
| The Story of Light (2012) | Modern Primitive (2016) | Inviolate (2022) |

Professional ratings
Review scores
| Source | Rating |
|---|---|
| Classic Rock | 3/5 stars |
| PopMatters | 7/10 |

Modern Primitive is the ninth studio album by American guitarist Steve Vai, released on Epic Records on June 24, 2016. According to his website, the material on the album was "based on song sketches and works-in-progress penned and recorded by Vai following the release of Flex-Able, his debut album, in January 1984." He sees this material as a link between the stylistically different Flex-Able and Passion and Warfare (1990). The name of the album refers to his "modern" finishing of some of his oldest, most "primitive" works (when he was then in his mid-20s).

== Track listing ==
All music is composed by Steve Vai, except where noted.

Modern Primitive track listing
| No. | Title | Length |
|---|---|---|
| 1. | "Bop!" | 5:37 |
| 2. | "Dark Matter" | 3:53 |
| 3. | "Mighty Messengers" | 3:57 |
| 4. | "The Lost Chord" (Vai, Devin Townsend) | 4:10 |
| 5. | "Upanishads" | 4:37 |
| 6. | "Fast Note People" (Martin Schwartz, Bob Harris, Vai) | 5:53 |
| 7. | "And We Are One" | 5:22 |
| 8. | "Never Forever" | 5:16 |
| 9. | "Lights Are On" | 6:26 |
| 10. | "No Pockets" | 4:54 |

Pink and Blows Over
| No. | Title | Length |
|---|---|---|
| 11. | "Part I" | 3:22 |
| 12. | "Part II (Mars Attack)" (Vai, Thomas Mariano) | 13:16 |
| 13. | "Part III" | 3:31 |

== Personnel ==
- Steve Vai – guitars
- Mohini Dey – bass (1)
- Jeremy Colson – drums (2, 7)
- Alvin Chea – backing vocals (3, 6–8, 10–13)
- Antonio Sol – backing vocals (3, 6–8, 10–13)
- Fletcher Sheridan – backing vocals (3, 6–8, 10–13)
- Mandy Vajar – backing vocals (3, 6–8, 10–13)
- Nayanna Holley – backing vocals (3, 6–8, 10–13)
- Stu Hamm – bass (3–6, 9–13)
- Chris Frazier – drums (3–6, 9–13)
- Devin Townsend – vocals (4)
- Philip Bynoe – bass (7–8)
- Mike Mangini – drums (8)
- Mike Keneally – keyboards (8)
- Dave Weiner – sitar (8)
- Tommy Mars – keyboards* (11–13)
- Jazz James – vocals (11–13)
- Greg Wurth – "performer" (5)
- Marpran Cassiopeia Vai – "performer" (11–13)

== Charts ==
Chart performance for Modern Primitive
| Chart (2016) | Peak position |
|---|---|
| Belgian Albums (Ultratop Flanders) | 196 |
| Dutch Albums (Album Top 100) | 143 |
| French Albums (SNEP) | 151 |
| Italian Albums (FIMI) | 61 |
| Japanese Albums (Oricon) | 41 |
| Swiss Albums (Schweizer Hitparade) | 77 |
| UK Albums (OCC) | 118 |
| US Top Hard Rock Albums (Billboard) | 11 |
| US Top Rock Albums (Billboard) | 35 |
