= Real Illusions: Reflections =

Studio album by Steve Vai
- Released: February 22, 2005
- Studio: The Mothership Studio in Hollywood Hills; The Harmony Hut in Encino, Los Angeles; De Oosterpoort in Groningen; Paradiso in Amsterdam
- Genre: Instrumental rock, progressive metal, heavy metal, hard rock
- Length: 55:10
- Label: Epic
- Producer: Steve Vai

Steve Vai chronology
| The Ultra Zone (1999) | Real Illusions: Reflections (2005) | The Story of Light (2012) |

Real Illusions: Reflections is the seventh studio album by guitarist Steve Vai, released on February 22, 2005, through Epic Records. The album reached No. 147 on the U.S. Billboard 200, as well as No. 88 on the Dutch albums chart and No. 110 on the French albums chart.

Described by Vai as "rock fable", Real Illusions: Reflections is the first part of a three-part concept album about a town visited by the godsent Pamposh and his construction of the Church. "Lotus Feet", purposely designated as track seven (see The Seventh Song) and recorded live during three separate concerts in the Netherlands during Vai's 2004 "Aching Hunger Tour", was nominated for Best Rock Instrumental Performance at the 2006 Grammy Awards. Vai cites Bulgarian wedding music as having inspired "Freak Show Excess".

== Critical reception ==
Professional ratings
Review scores
| Source | Rating |
|---|---|
| AllMusic | 4/5 stars |

Sean Westergaard at AllMusic gave Real Illusions: Reflections a positive review, listing "K'm-Pee-Du-Wee", "Firewall", "Yai Yai", "Freak Show Excess" and "Lotus Feet" as highlights. He also remarked favorably about Vai's singing: "As a vocalist, he's gotten way more confident, and while it's doubtful his singing will ever be the primary attraction, he does a fine job here."

== Track listing ==
All tracks are written by Steve Vai.

| No. | Title | Length |
|---|---|---|
| 1. | "Building the Church" | 4:58 |
| 2. | "Dying for Your Love" | 4:50 |
| 3. | "Glorious" | 4:35 |
| 4. | "K'm-Pee-Du-Wee" | 4:00 |
| 5. | "Firewall" | 4:19 |
| 6. | "Freak Show Excess" | 6:51 |
| 7. | "Lotus Feet" (live) | 6:45 |
| 8. | "Yai Yai" | 2:37 |
| 9. | "Midway Creatures" | 3:42 |
| 10. | "I'm Your Secrets" | 4:26 |
| 11. | "Under it All" | 8:07 |
| Total length: | | 55:10 |

== Personnel ==
- Steve Vai – lead vocals, guitar, all instrumentation (except where noted), engineering, mixing, production
- Jeremy Colson – drums, percussion (track 5), additional percussion (tracks 4, 6, 10)
- Gregg Bissonette – percussion (track 5), additional percussion (tracks 4, 6, 10)
- Billy Sheehan – bass
- Bryan Beller – bass (track 7)
- Jerry Hey – trumpet (track 5)
- Gary Grant – trumpet (track 5)
- Dan Higgins – saxophone (track 5)
- Larry Williams – saxophone (track 5)
- Bill Reichenbach, Jr. – trombone (track 5)
- Charlie Loper – trombone (track 5)
- Stacy Ellis – background vocals (track 5)
- Metropole Orkest – orchestra (track 7)
- Chris Opperman – piano (track 7)
- Pia Vai – harp (track 11)
- Fire Vai – spoken vocals (track 11)
- Laurel Fishman – spoken vocals (track 11)
- Ruby Birman – spoken vocals (track 11)
- Len Birman – spoken vocals (track 11)
- Jeff Mallard – spoken vocals (track 11)
- Michael Mesker – spoken vocals (track 11)
- Thomas Nordegg – spoken vocals (track 11)
- David Kole – orchestration (track 7)
- Dick Bakker – conducting (track 7)
- Neil Citron – engineering assistance
- Paul Bliven – engineering assistance
- Bernie Grundman – mastering

== Chart performance ==
| Year | Chart | Position |
|---|---|---|
| 2005 | Billboard Independent Albums | 15 |
| 2005 | Dutch albums chart | 88 |
| 2005 | French albums chart | 110 |
| 2005 | Billboard 200 | 147 |
| 2005 | Billboard Top Internet Albums | 147 |
| 2005 | Greek Albums | 25 |

== Awards ==
| Event | Title | Award | Result |
|---|---|---|---|
| 2006 Grammys | "Lotus Feet" | Best Rock Instrumental Performance | Nominated |
