= Inviolate (album) =

Studio album by Steve Vai
- Released: January 28, 2022
- Studio: Harmony Hut (Encino, California); Studio 606 (Northridge, California)
- Genre: Instrumental rock
- Length: 46:40
- Label: Favored Nations
- Producer: Steve Vai

Steve Vai chronology
Modern Primitive (2016)	Inviolate (2022)	Vai/Gash (2023)

Professional ratings
Review scores
Source	Rating
Classic Rock	3/5 stars

Inviolate (/ɪnˈvaɪoʊlət/ in-VYE-oh-lət) is the tenth studio album by American guitarist Steve Vai, released on Favored Nations on January 28, 2022. The album cover shows a photo of the Hydra triple-neck guitar designed by Steve Vai in conjunction with Ibanez. It was ranked as the 3rd best guitar album of 2022 by Guitar World readers, who also ranked the solo of "Teeth of the Hydra" as the 3rd best guitar solo of 2022.

== Track listing ==
All music is composed by Steve Vai.

Inviolate track listing
No.	Title	Length
1.	"Teeth of the Hydra"	5:12
2.	"Zeus in Chains"	4:38
3.	"Little Pretty"	6:25
4.	"Candlepower"	3:30
5.	"Apollo in Color"	4:18
6.	"Avalancha"	5:09
7.	"Greenish Blues"	6:06
8.	"Knappsack"	5:18
9.	"Sandman Cloud Mist"	6:00
Total length:		46:40

Japan edition bonus track
No.	Title	Length
10.	"Swamp Fairies"	1:11
Total length:		47:55

== Personnel ==
- Steve Vai – guitars, left handed guitar parts (8), programming (1, 2, 8), bass (1, 2, 4)
- Jeremy Colson – drums (2, 3, 6, 7)
- Terry Bozzio – drums (4)
- Vinnie Colaiuta – drums (5, 9)
- Bryan Beller – bass (3)
- Henrik Linder – bass (5)
- Billy Sheehan – bass (6)
- Philip Bynoe – bass (7, 9)

== Charts ==
Chart performance for Inviolate
Chart (2022)	Peak position
Belgian Albums (Ultratop Flanders)	141
French Albums (SNEP)	127
Dutch Albums (Album Top 100)	13
German Albums (Offizielle Top 100)	65
Japanese Albums (Oricon)	32
Scottish Albums (OCC)	33
Swiss Albums (Schweizer Hitparade)	25
UK Independent Albums (OCC)	11
UK Rock & Metal Albums (OCC)	5
