= Gregory Page (musician) =

American singer

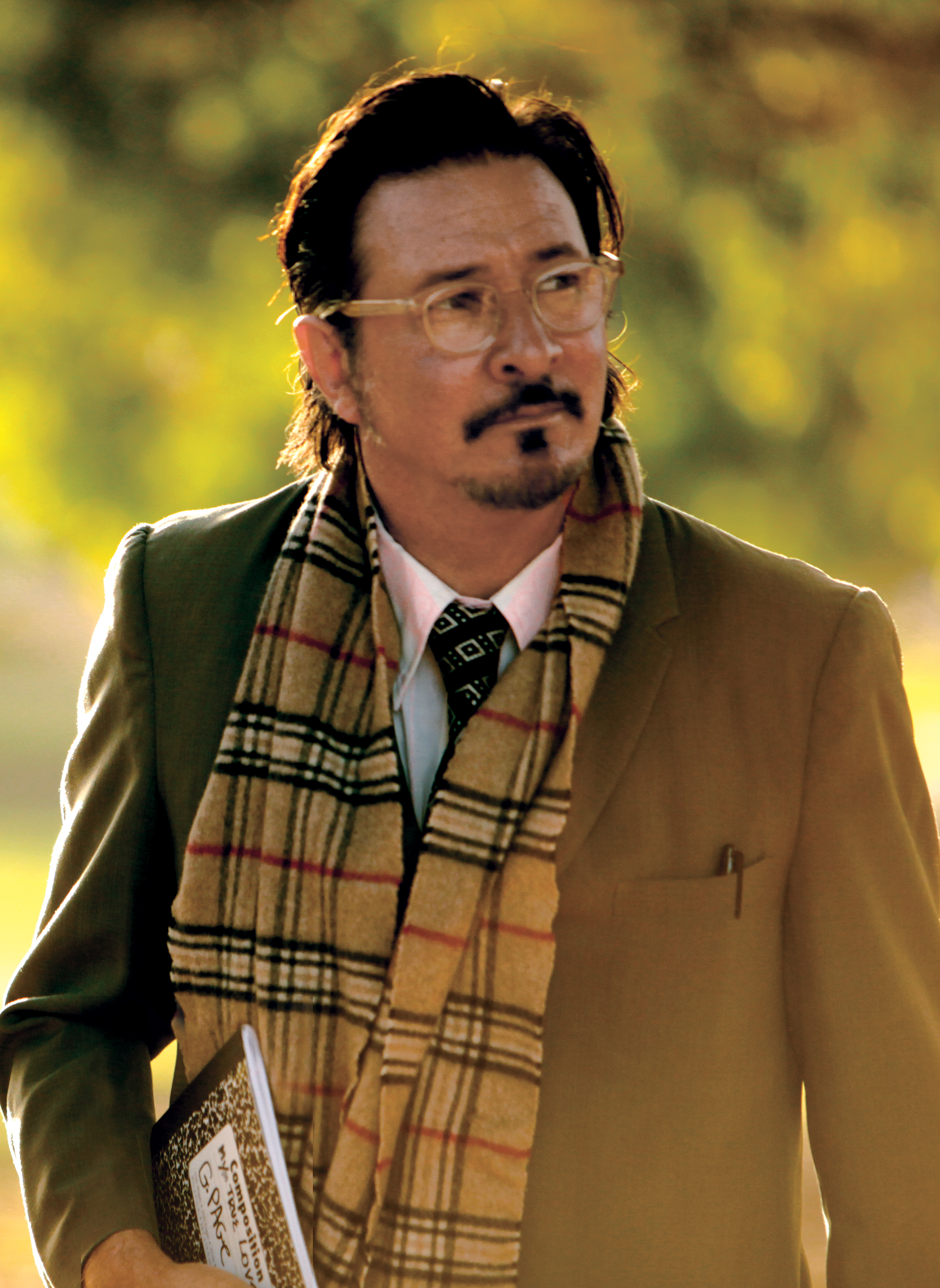
- Gregory Page in July 2011

Background information
- Born: April 28, 1963 (age 63); North London, England
- Occupations: Singer-songwriter, guitarist
- Instruments: Guitar, Bass guitar
- Years active: 1991–present
- Label: V2 Records
- Member of: The Rugburns
- Website: gregorypage.com

Gregory Page (born April 28, 1963) is an English-born American singer-songwriter and guitarist.

== Biography ==
Page is the son of a traveling Armenian pop singer whom he would not meet for over 40 years. His Irish mother was the lead singer/saxophone player in one of Britain's first all-girl groups, The Beat-Chics, that toured with The Beatles. Born in North London, England, he was a shy boy, fond of books and pictures, a solitary rambler in the woods and fields around his country home in England. At age fourteen he went to America, and for the next 5 years he wrote poetry and learned to play the guitar. During this time he got to know music intimately. James Taylor and Paul Simon were his great loves, but he admired Leonard Cohen, Nick Drake and other sentimental musicians who wrote about the sufferings of the poor and abandoned.

In Southern California, Page began to doubt himself and his work. A rebuff from a girl he loved was the starting point of his despair. Writing about this wretched world and finding some consolation in his clumsy efforts to represent what he saw and felt, he resolved at twenty-seven, after a period of wandering and depressing uncertainty, to become a songwriter. He thought this was his only means of salvation, a solitary and pure activity in which he would be free, responsible for himself alone, and yet might create a work that would give joy and understanding to others.

Page's music has been featured on BBC, NPR, and film and television soundtracks, including Ray Donovan & Better Things.

Besides working on his own music, Page has also worked with an array of artists such as Jason Mraz, John Doe, Jewel, Tom Brosseau, Steve Poltz, John C. Reilly, Tim Knol and A.J. Croce. According to Mraz: "He’s the real deal, a rare gift." In 1997, John Doe, formerly of the band X, provided lead guitar on and produced his independently released Fare thee Well album, which was never released. In the 1990s, Page was a member of The Rugburns.

Page was a special guest on Jason Mraz and Toca Rivera's 2018 Live in Stereo tour, which visited cities across the United States.

Page is currently living in Southern California and frequently tours Europe and Australia. He has released two books of his poetry, The Blank Page and Let's Go Get Lost. His third book Growing Smaller will be released in 2020.

== Discography ==
- God Makes Ghosts
- "Live" in Australia
- Under the Rainbow
- Grace in Arms
- Music for Mortals
- Drawing Down The Moon (1992)
- The Romantic Adventures of Harry (1995/2005)
- A Dream To Remember (1995)
- The Romantic Adventures Of Harry (1996)
- Fare Thee Well (1998, Produced By John Doe)
- "Live" From Lestat's (1999)
- "Live" From The Basement in Oz (1999)
- Music For Mortals (2000)
- Unhappy Hour (2001)
- And I Look Up (2001)
- Under The Rainbow (2002)
- God Makes Ghosts (2002)
- Grace In Arms (2003)
- The Reality of Dinosaurs (2004)(EP)
- Sleeping Dogs (2005)
- Daydreaming At Night (2006)
- Love Made Me Drunk (2006)
- Daydreaming At Night (2006)
- Happiness Is Being Lonely (2007)
- Knife in My Chest (2008, Produced By Jason Mraz)
- All Make Believe (2008)
- Bird in a Cage (2009)
- Once & For All (2010, Produced By Jason Mraz)
- Promise Of A Dream (European Release 2010)
- Heartstrings (2010)
- My True Love (2011)
- Shine, Shine, Shine (2012)
- Right Side Up (2014, Recorded by Jason Mraz & Kellogg Boynton)
- One Way Journey Home (2015)
- Let's Fall In Love Again
- So It Goes (2017)
- A Wild Rose (2018)
- One Hell Of A Memory (2020)

Collaborations

- John C. Reilly & Friends
- The American Folksingers ~ Volume 1 & 2 (With Tom Brosseau)
- The Hatchet Brothers ~ "Love Hurts" & "Tools Of The Trade"
- The Rugburns ~ "Morning Wood", "Mommy I'm Sorry" & "Taking The World By Donkey"
