= Hat (Mike Keneally album) =

hat.

Studio album by Mike Keneally
- Released: 1992
- Recorded: 1989–1992
- Genre: Rock in Opposition, avant-prog
- Language: English
- Label: Exowax
- Producer: Mike Keneally

Mike Keneally chronology
hat. (1992)	Boil That Dust Speck (1994)

Hat, stylized as hat., is the first studio album by Mike Keneally, originally released in 1992 on Exowax Recordings. It includes the 14 minutes-long complex composition "Lightin' Roy" (dedicated to Frank Zappa) performed entirely by Keneally.

== Track listing ==
All songs composed by Mike Keneally, except "The Car Song", composed by Mike and Marty Keneally.

1. "Your Quimby Dollars at Work" - 0:38
2. "I Can't Stop" - 3:31
3. "Ugly Town" - 3:43
4. "Open Up!" - 3:43
5. "Dhen Tin" - 1:17
6. "Spearmint Pup" - 1:57
7. "Fencing" - 3:11
8. "Always Man" - 2:25
9. "My Immense Superiority Over the Silverfish" - 0:15
10. "Eno and the Actor" - 2:30
11. "The Car Song" - 5:15
12. "Heaven Likes You/Apple Pie" - 2:11
13. "Backstage with Wilson Phillips" - 2:41
14. "Here Is What I Dreamed" - 3:07
15. "Here Is Why" - 2:13
16. "Performing Miracles" - 3:40
17. "Spoon Guy" - 1:09
18. "And That's Why It's Called Spunk" - 0:07
19. "Johnny One-Note/The Exciting New Toothpaste from Mars" - 1:27
20. "Day of the Cow 1" - 2:23
21. "Snowcow" - 4:38
22. "Day of the Cow 2" - 1:12
23. "We're Rockin' All Night wit the Tangy Flavor of Cheddar" - 4:53
24. "Rosemary Girl" - 3:30
25. "Lightnin' Roy" - 14:46

== Personnel ==
- Mike Keneally - vocals, guitars, keyboards, bass, percussion
- Doug Booth - bass on 2, 10, 11, 16, 24
- Mark DeCerbo - sad vocals on 3
- Marty Eldrige - percussion on 4, 20; harmonica on 20
- Marty Keneally - Effect guitars on 16
- Paul Abbott - Acoustic guitar on 21
- Kevin Gilbert - backing vocals on 10, 12
- Tom Freeman - drums on 4, 5, 8, 20, 22
- Doug Lunn - bass on 1, 3, 13, 14, 15, 17, 23
- Daryl Monroe - vocals on 3
- Carlos Olmeda - backing vocals on 5
- Toss Panos - drums on 1, 3, 13, 14, 15, 17, 23
- Alan Silverstein - drums on 2, 7, 10, 11, 16, 24; bells on 8
- Bob Tedde - backing vocals on 11, 16
- Cici Porter - backing vocals on 8, 14, 24
- Andy Vereen - backing vocals on 24
- Buddy Blue - dobro, dialogue
- Scott Thunes - bass on 7, 8
