= Barry Stagg =

- Born: 1944 (age 81–82)
- Origin: Montreal, Quebec, Canada
- Occupations: Musician, playwright

Barry Stagg (born April 9, 1944) is a Canadian musician and playwright and from Montreal. He graduated from the Université de Montréal, and recently moved to North Carolina from Nova Scotia.

== Life and works ==
Stagg was born April 9, 1944, in Montreal and spent the first 29 years of his life in the city. Stagg has written and recorded songs for Gamma Records, United Artists, London Records and RCA. He has written film scores for documentaries, as well as numerous mini-operas. He is well known for his world hit song "To Love Means to be Free" which was released on his Green and Stagg album in 1969 that won the Canadian Business Music Industry writing award. From 1989–present, playwright-in-residence for the Nosco Academy of Theatre Arts. During that time over 60 musicals were written and composed, covering a wide range of themes.

From 2002 to 2003, Stagg was commissioned to write a 16 piece musical composition with lyrics entitled "Psalms from the Ark" for the ballet company centered at The Dance Center of Spruce Pine of North Carolina. In late 2004, he released the album Slaughterhouse of Love.

Stagg's most recent album No More Mountains to Cross was released in 2009. A CD release party was held at the Carolina Theater in Spruce Pine, North Carolina, July 11, 2009.

== Discography ==
=== Albums ===
Year	Album
1969	Anthony Green & Barry Stagg
1978	Barry Stagg
2004	Slaughterhouse of Love
2009	No More Mountains to Cross

=== Singles ===
Year	Single	Chart Positions			Album
Year	Single	CAN AC	CAN	CAN Country	Album
1970	"To Love Means to Be Free" (with Anthony Green)	29	42	—	Anthony Green & Barry Stagg
1970	"Face of the Sun" (with Anthony Green)	11	86	—	Anthony Green & Barry Stagg
1970	"It's Been a Long Time" (with Anthony Green)	7	50	—	singles only
1972	"Old Fashioned Ways" (with Anthony Green)	—	—	40	singles only
1973	"Window of Your Life" (with Anthony Green)	44	—	—	singles only
1977	"Stay"	45	—	—	Barry Stagg
1978	"Children of the Dream"	38	—	—	Barry Stagg
1980	"The Warm Maritimes"	31	—	38	singles only
1981	"This Is My Best Song"	22	—	—	singles only
