= Chris Opperman =

American composer

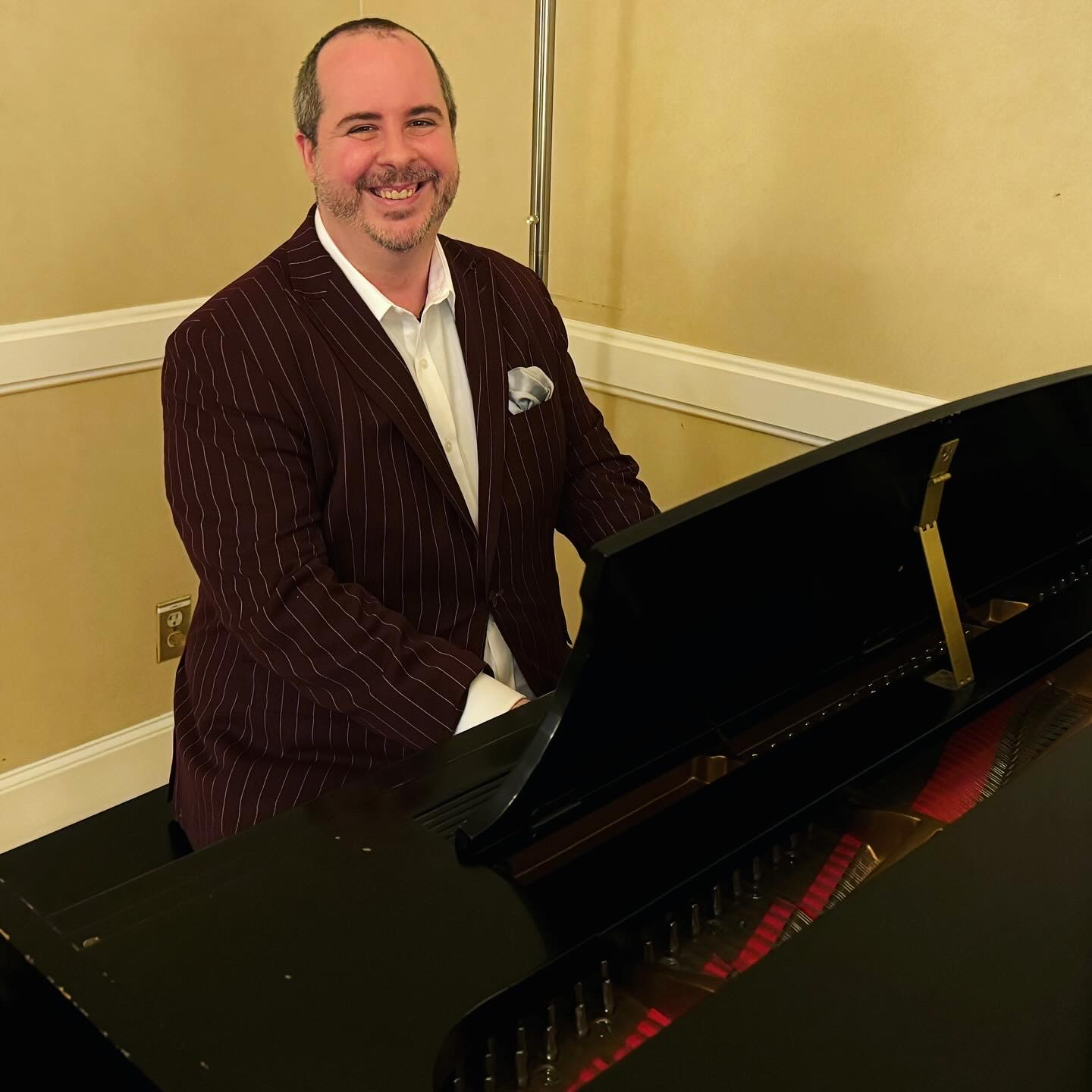
- Opperman at Boston Symphony Hall, 2023

Background information
- Born: November 20, 1978
- Origin: Clifton, New Jersey, U.S.
- Genres: Alternative rock; classical
- Occupations: Musician; composer
- Instruments: Piano; trumpet; guitar; vocals
- Formerly of: Steve Vai; Mike Keneally

Chris Opperman (born November 20, 1978) is an American composer. He is known mostly for his work orchestrating the music of guitarists Steve Vai and Mike Keneally for their respective performances with Holland's Metropole Orkest. Opperman also performed on Steve Vai's first round of orchestral concerts, and the song "Lotus Feet" was nominated for the 2006 Grammy Award for Best Rock Instrumental Performance. "The Attitude Song" from Vai's album Sound Theories Vol. I & II was nominated for the 2008 Grammy Award for Best Rock Instrumental Performance.

Opperman has also worked with AWR Music Productions since 2011, a company organized by composer Arnie Roth.

== Biography ==
Raised in Clifton, New Jersey, Opperman graduated from Clifton High School in 1996, where he participated in the school's marching band on the cornet.

Opperman has several albums of his own music. His style is described as a cross between 1990s alternative rock and his favorite 20th-century composers (Schoenberg, Stravinsky, Webern, and Zappa). His main instrument is the piano. He has also been known to play the trumpet and the guitar at times and will occasionally sing. He lived in Los Angeles, California, from 2000 to 2008; when he moved back to New Jersey he earned a master's degree in music theory / composition from Montclair State University in May 2010. He earned his PhD in Music Composition from the Mason Gross School of the Arts at Rutgers University.

In 2019, Opperman ran a successful Kickstarter campaign for his sixth album Chamber Music from Hell. The album was produced by longtime bassist for Dweezil Zappa, Kurt Morgan. It is a contemporary-classical concept album about a posthuman civilization and the music that follows. One of the pieces, "Are We Living in a Computer Simulation?" was inspired by an essay by philosopher Nick Bostrom and was featured in Prog magazine UK.

In 2020, Opperman collaborated with composer/conductor Eric Roth and the Fifth House Ensemble on a tour and album of chamber music from the videogame Undertale by Toby Fox, called Undertale LIVE.

== Discography ==
=== Solo releases ===
- Oppy Music, Vol. I: Purple, Crayon (1998)
- Klavierstucke (2001)
- Concepts of Non-linear Time (2004)
- Beyond the Foggy Highway (2005)
- The Lionheart (2010)
- "Aphrodite Nights" (2011) – single
- Studio House (2013) – EP
- "And If You Know" (2020) – single
- Chamber Music from Hell (2020)
- Four Improvisations (2022) – EP
- Still Waters (2023)

=== As sideman ===
With AWR Music Productions

- Undertale Live (2020)
- Distant Worlds VI: More Music from FINAL FANTASY (2023)
- A New World III: intimate music from FINAL FANTASY (2024)
- Distant Worlds VII: More Music from FINAL FANTASY (2025)

With Steve Vai

- Real Illusions: Reflections (2005)
- Sound Theories Vol. I & II (2007)
- Playlist: The Very Best of Steve Vai (2009)
- Naked Tracks, Vol. 5 (2008)
- Naked Tracks, Vol. 6 (2013)

With Mike Keneally

- Dancing (2000)
- Dancing with Myself (2000)
- The Universe Will Provide (2004)
- Parallel Universe (2004)
- Dog (2004)
- Guitar Therapy Live (2006)
- Wine and Pickles (2008)
- You Must Be This Tall (2013)
- Live at Lynagh's – Lexington, KY – May 18, 2001 (2024)
- Nonkertompf Live – Groningen, The Netherlands – October 19, 2001 (2024)
