= Face of the Rising Sun =

Face of the Rising Sun may refer to:

- a 1996 novel by William Sarabande
- Tyler Breeze's nickname for himself in 2015
