= Boil That Dust Speck =

Studio album by Mike Keneally
- Released: 1994
- Label: Exowax
- Producer: Mike Keneally

Mike Keneally chronology
hat. (1992)	Boil That Dust Speck (1994)	Half Alive in Hollywood (1997)

Boil That Dust Speck is the second studio album by american multi-instrumentalist Mike Keneally, released in 1994. The album was influenced by several personal events in 1993, including the birth of Keneally’s daughter, the death of his father, and the passing of Frank Zappa.

The album includes several compositions that have remained part of Keneally’s live repertoire. The three-part suite "The Old Boat Guy" has often been interpreted as a tribute to Frank Zappa. The track "Faithful Axe", with a running time of 1:26, features more than 20 musical references to songs by the English progressive rock band Yes.

== Main personnel ==
- Mike Keneally – guitars, vocals, keyboards, bass, drums, percussion, slide whistle, bicycle horn, bug keychain, tantrum
- Doug Lunn – bass
- Bryan Beller – bass
- Toss Panos – drums, percussion
- Joe Travers – drums, percussion
- Tom Freeman – drums, percussion
- Alan Silverstein – drums, percussion

== Guest musicians ==
- Mark DeCerbo – vocals
- Bob Tedde – vocals
- Satnam Ramgotra – tabla, ending mouth
- Doug Booth – flutes
- Stutz Bearcat – spoken word

== Production ==
- Mike Keneally – producer

== Track listing ==
All tracks composed by Mike Keneally.

1. "Sooth" (2:30)
2. "'Cause of Breakfast" (5:08)
3. "The Desired Effect" (3:34)
4. "Skunk" (2:42)
5. "I'm Glad There's Lemon-Freshened Thorax in You" (0:09)
6. "Top of Stove Melting" (2:42)
7. "Aglow" (2:49)
8. "Bryan Beller's Favorite Song" (0:21)
9. "Deep-Fried Skinks Are Go" (0:31)
10. "Good Morning, Sometime" (1:40)
11. "Them Dolphins Is Smart" (0:59)
12. "1988 Was a Million Years Ago" (3:32)
13. "Yep, Them Dolphins Is Smart, Alright" (1:59)
14. "Bullys (sic)" (5:57)
15. "My Dilemma" (4:02)
16. "Helen Was Brash" (1:13)
17. "Weekend" (3:55)
18. "Land of Broken Dreams" (2:28)
19. "Blameless (The Floating Face)" (2:15)
20. "That Claim-Jumping Swine, O'Bannon" (1:06)
21. "Faithful Axe" (1:26)
22. "Natty Trousers" (2:27)
23. "Scotch" (3:47)
24. "There Have Been Bad Moments" (4:43)
25. "Frang Tang, The Valentine Bear" (1:53)
26. "I Will" (0:44)
27. "In the Bone World" (2:33)
28. "The Old Boat Guy, Part One" (2:27)
29. "The Old Boat Guy, Part Two" (2:04)
30. "The Old Boat Guy, Part Three" (2:48)
