= The Rugburns =

American rock band

- Origin: San Diego, California, U.S.
- Genres: Alternative rock, cowpunk
- Years active: 1992–present
- Labels: Priority Records; Mercury Records; Bizarre/Planet Records
- Members: Steve Poltz • Vocals Guitar; Robert Driscoll • Guitar; Stinky • Drums; John Castro • Bass

The Rugburns are an American rock band from San Diego, California, United States.

== Origins ==
The Rugburns originally formed as a duo by Steve Poltz and Robert Driscoll. This evolved into a quartet (1993-1996) featuring Steve Poltz, "Dr." Robert Driscoll, drummer Stinky, and bassist Gregory Page. They are currently a trio (1997–present) featuring Steve Poltz, Stinky, and bassist John Castro.

== History ==
The Rugburns group (not to be confused with the Los Angeles area Rugburns 1986–1989) formed and began playing in the local San Diego, CA area as a duo. In the beginning, Steve Poltz and Robert Driscoll were acoustic duo playing in various coffeehouses and bars including the Blarney Stone Pub, the Mission Beach Club, Innerchange Coffee House, Megalopolis, and Java Joe's. They would sometimes be joined by Gerald "Child" McMullin making them a temporary acoustic power trio. The group released several self-produced cassette tapes in this band formation and were becoming a huge local draw and favorite in San Diego.

=== Debut album, Morning Wood - 1994 ===
After the group signed a contract with Bizarre/Planet Records in 1993 (a label associated with Herb Cohen, who had earlier managed Linda Ronstadt, Tom Waits and Frank Zappa), the duo wanted to add a rhythm section for a full, 'radio friendly' sound. It was then, the duo permanently changed to a foursome with bassist singer/songwriter Gregory Page and drummer Stinky. The quartet released their debut album Morning Wood which was produced by Buddy Blue (of The Beat Farmers), in early 1994.
With funny, witty and sometimes bizarre lyrics, the band began to experience their first taste of national exposure; playing a sold out show at world-famous Cleveland Agora Theater and Ballroom.

The songs "Hitchhiker Joe" and "Me and Eddie Vedder" would go on to be the most recognizable tracks on the album. The song "Hitchhiker Joe" (written by Steve Poltz and Steve Foth of the San Diego Band C.L.A.) received a large amount of national airplay and held the No. 1 slot on the nightly "Top 10" for several weeks on San Diego station 91X in early 1994.

The video for "Hitchhiker Joe" was filmed at a local San Diego high school, and was directed by Michael Addis, who went on to direct several feature films. Poltz's girlfriend at the time was singer-songwriter Jewel, and she also appeared in the video.

"Me and Eddie Vedder" is a strident introspection on the preposterous possibilities of overdosing in a hotel room alongside Eddie Vedder. The experience concludes with Vedder and Poltz overdosing while an 8-track player is blaring the Houses of the Holy album.

=== EP "Mommy I'm Sorry" - 1995 ===
In early 1995, the band released an EP called "Mommy I'm Sorry," which included the song "Dick's Automotive," which is a favorite at The Rugburns shows. After "Weird Al" Yankovic saw one of the band's sold out performances at the Hollywood Troubadore, he met the band and soon after wrote a similar song, "Albuquerque".

The album also contains a cover of the theme song of the children's television series Sesame Street.

=== Second album; Taking the World By Donkey - 1995 ===
In 1995, the band signed a deal with Priority Records. The Rugburns released their second full-length album in late 1995, Taking the World By Donkey, which again featured a generous helping of acoustic guitars spiked with edgy lyrics. The humor and cutting wit was still in the songwriting but there was an addition of a few darker themes. "The Ballad of Tommy and Marla" tells the sad tale of a couple that becomes hooked on crystal meth and eventually have their entire lives destroyed by their drug abuse, but in an endearing and fun manner.

After the band's back to back touring of the entire United States, Gregory Page left the band to pursue a solo career and was replaced with John Castro. Soon after Page had departed, Driscoll left the band because of tour related health issues but recovered well and returned to teaching high school, his first profession. The band was to be known from then on as a trio: Steve Poltz, John Castro and Stinky. The Rugburns were now achieving their biggest national fame. The national fame was in part because of radio play and the constant touring year to year. A serious boost came when the Jewel Kilcher fans, known as Everyday Angels began to follow the group and post about them on the Everyday Angels internet chat group. For several years, Steve Poltz and Jewel had been together romantically. Poltz co-wrote her biggest hit, "You Were Meant for Me" and also appeared the video for the song. On Jewel's "Tiny Lights" tour, the Rugburns were the opening act and her backing band.

== Steve Poltz solo ==
It was at this time that Poltz was trying to create a solo career alongside the Rugburns. Poltz then released two solo albums on the Mercury label: One Left Shoe (1997) and Conversations Over a Cerveza (1998).

Then after being dropped from Mercury, Poltz self-released several other albums: Answering Machine (1999), Live at Largo (2000), Live at the Basement DVD (2003), Chinese Vacation (2003), The Barn (2007), Tales from the Tavern CD/DVD (2007), Unraveling (2008), Traveling (2008) and Dreamhouse (2010).

== Currently ==
Steve Poltz, Rob Driscoll, Stinky, Gregory Page and John Castro still perform as The Rugburns.

- Songwriter: Steve Poltz tours solo, with the Rugburns and with various other musicians.
- Bass: Gregory Page has a critically acclaimed solo career releasing many albums.
- Guitarist: Rob Driscoll teaches High School and plays with the Rugburns when he can.
- Drummer: Stinky records/tours with groups big and small releasing many albums.
- Bass: John Castro has released many albums with Pretendo, Morricone Youth and many others.

== Members ==
- Steve Poltz - Vocals & Guitar
- Robert Driscoll - Guitar
- Gregory Page - Bass
- John Castro - Bass
- Jeff Aafedt - Drums

== Discography ==
The Rugburns

- 1989: Polyester Angst (Indie Cassette Release)
- 1990: Yo Baby Dolls!! Chill Your Minds (Indie Cassette Release)
- 1991: Lick Her Shoes (Indie Cassette Release)
- 1992: The Real World (indie Cassette Release)
- 1994: Morning Wood (Bizarre/Planet Records)
- 1995: Mommy I'm Sorry EP (Bizarre/Planet Records)
- 1995: Taking the World By Donkey (Priority Records)

Steve Poltz - Solo

- 1997 "One Left Shoe" (Mercury Records)
- 1998 "Conversations Over a Cerveza" (Mercury Records)
- 2012 "Noineen Noiny Noin"(Arrival Records)
- 2019 "Shine On"(Red House Records)

Steve Poltz - Solo • independently released albums

- 1997 "Answering Machine"(Independent Release)
- 1998 "Live at Largo"(Independent Release)
- 2003 "Chinese Vacation"(Independent Release)
- 2007 "The Barn"(Independent Release)
- 2008 "Tales from the Tavern"(Independent Release)
- 2008 "Unraveling"(Independent Release)
- 2008 "Traveling"(Independent Release)
- 2010 "Dreamhouse"(Independent Release)
- 2014 "The Accident"(Independent Release)
- 2016 "Folksinger"(Independent Release)

== Videography ==
Steve Poltz - Solo

- 1998 "Live at the Basement" DVD(Independent Release)
- 1998 "Tales from the Tavern" DVD(Independent Release)
