= Dave Weiner =

American guitarist (born 1976)

- Born: September 24, 1976 (age 50)
- Genres: Heavy metal, Hard rock, Progressive rock
- Instruments: Guitar, bass guitar, electric sitar

David Jason Weiner (born September 24, 1976) is an American musician, best known for being one of Steve Vai's touring guitarists. He also gives online guitar lessons.

== Steve Vai ==
Weiner first joined Vai's band when Weiner went to Los Angeles to go to GIT. During his time there he got a job as an intern for an office, and his boss at this office managed Steve Vai. He would deliver paper to Vai's house, and Weiner got to know him personally and subsequently gave him a demo. About two weeks later his boss got a phone call from Vai and was asked to come over to Vai's studio, learn fourteen songs, and go on tour with him. Weiner continued to perform as part of Vai's band for 23 years, until announcing his retirement in 2022.

== Solo ==
Weiner has also released three solo albums. The first, entitled Shove the Sun Aside was released originally in June 2004 on the Meyer Jane Music label and re-released in March 2005 on Favored Nations. It is an instrumental album on which Weiner primarily plays a seven-string guitar. His second album On Revolute started shipping on May 25, 2010. His third album contains 10 acoustic songs and is titled A Collection of Short Stories: Vol. 1. It was released August 10, 2012. Vol. 2 is an EP. Stsa-X, is another re-release of Dave’s debut record and contains 3 new tracks.

== Discography ==
- Shove the Sun Aside (2004)
- Shove the Sun Aside (Re-release) (2005)
- On Revolute (2010)
- A Collection of Short Stories: Vol. 1 (2012)
- Stsa-X (2016)
- A Collection of Short Stories: Vol. 2 [EP] (2021)
