= Steve Poltz =

Canadian-American singer-songwriter and guitarist (born 1960)

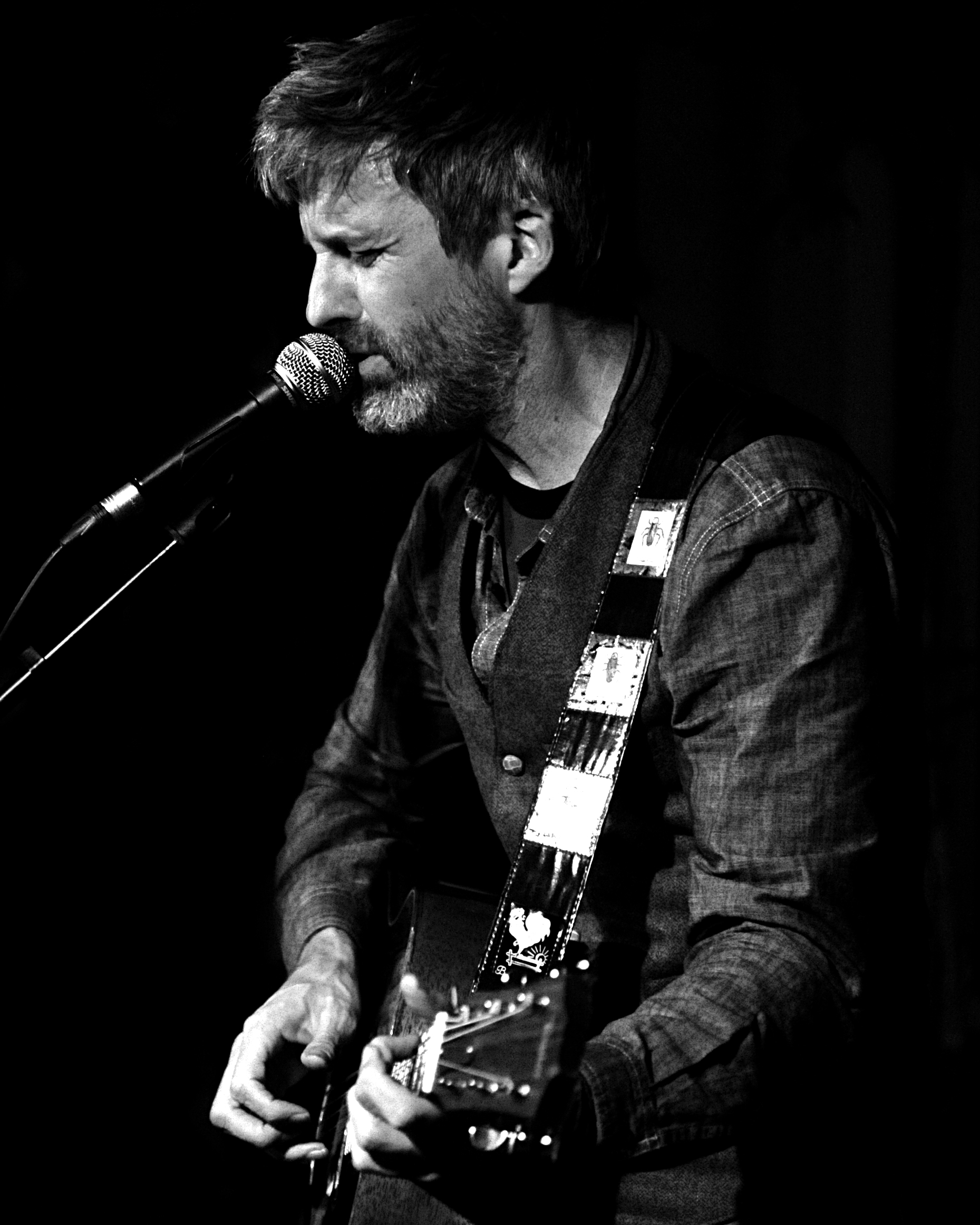
- Poltz performance in Café Continental, October 2012

Background information
- Born: February 19, 1960 (age 66); Halifax, Nova Scotia, Canada
- Origin: San Diego, California, US
- Genres: Pop rock, indie-rock, folk rock
- Occupations: Musician, songwriter
- Instruments: Vocals, guitar
- Years active: 1990s- current
- Labels: Mercury Records, 98 Pounder Records, Scam-o-Rama Records, Polygram
- Website: poltz.com

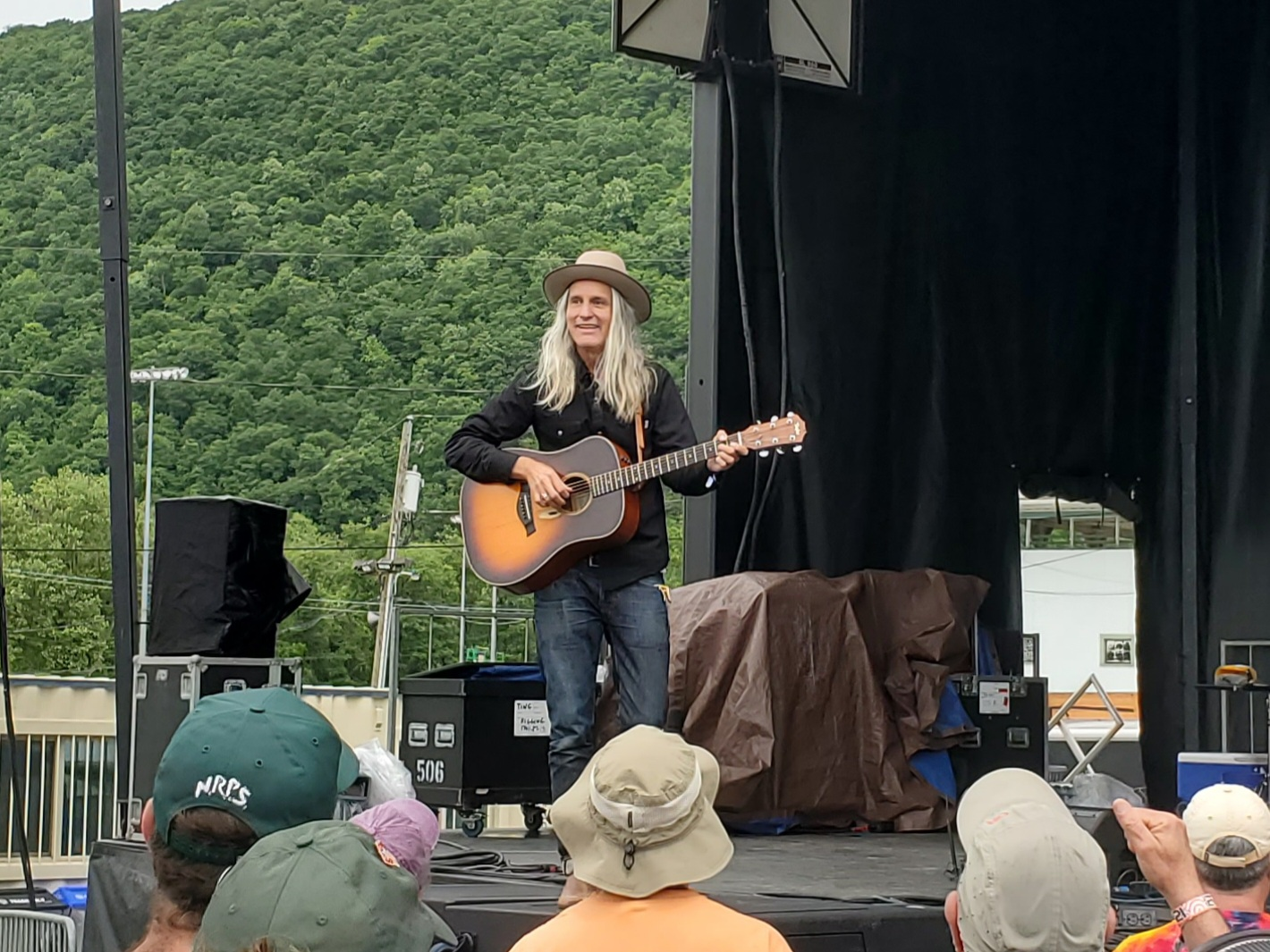
Steve Poltz performing at DelFest in May 2022, with his guitar called Smokey Joe

Steve Poltz (born February 19, 1960) is a Canadian-American singer-songwriter and guitarist. He is a founding member of the indie-rock band the Rugburns and collaborated on several songs with singer Jewel, including the 1996 single "You Were Meant for Me", which reached number 2 in the US.

As a solo artist, he often performs acoustic-only "good old-fashioned sing-along" shows.

== Early life ==
Poltz was born in Halifax, Nova Scotia, and later immigrated with his family to Pasadena, California; ultimately moving to Palm Springs, California. He attended the University of San Diego, where he received a degree in political science. He met guitarist Robert Driscoll and the Rugburns were formed.

== Career ==
Poltz and his bandmates developed a local and national cult following by playing coffeehouses and bars. While performing dates at the Innerchange Coffeehouse in San Diego, he formed a relationship with Jewel, frequently opening for her on tours, co-writing songs, and appearing in her music video for "You Were Meant For Me." The song made it to Number 2 on the U.S. Billboard Hot 100 song charts, charting in four other categories in the USA, and several European countries. Poltz has also covered songs by others, which include some Jerry Hannan songs at live gigs.

In 1998, Poltz released his first solo album, One Left Shoe, for Mercury Records. A disagreement in the artistic direction of his material led to him leaving the label and forming his own company, 98 Pounder Records. Five years later, he recorded Chinese Vacation, an album heavily influenced by the events of September 11 and the murder of one of his closest friends. During a radio interview and performance on the Dave and Jimmy radio program, he performed a "male" version of "You Were Meant For Me". During the bridge, he went on a 5-minute rant on the morning zoo with Dave and Jimmy from WNCI and assorted stories in Las Vegas, including one that led to the album name One Left Shoe. Poltz also performed the song on the Bob and Tom Show and included the Cassidy story during the bridge.

In 2000, Poltz was awarded the title of "San Diego's Most Influential Artist of the Decade" at the 2000 San Diego Music Awards.

In 2012, Poltz guest-starred in the web series Up the Creek as a Canadian country singer named Peeve Stoltz. He improvised the songs in the episode during filming.

Poltz collaborated as a songwriter with A. J. Croce on Croce's 2004 album Adrian James Croce.

According to his website biography, Poltz considers "Everything About You" to be the favorite among his own songs. It appears on the soundtrack album to the 1999 film Notting Hill.

Poltz is known to name his various guitars. They include Smokey Joe, which he saved from being destroyed, Clackety-Clack, Flowerpot, and Trailer-Trash.

Dreamer: A Tribute to Kent Finlay, released in early 2016 on Austin-based Eight 30 Records, features Poltz' version of Finlay's "The Plight of the Bumblebee".

In 2025 he contributed a cover of Joel Plaskett's "Absentminded Melody" to the Plaskett tribute album Songs from the Gang.

== Albums ==
- One Left Shoe (Mercury, 1997)
- Conversations Over a Cerveza (Mercury, 1998)
- Answering Machine (Scam-o-Rama Records)
- Live at Largo (98 Pounder, 2000)
- Chinese Vacation (Immergent, 2003)
- The Barn with Songs by Steve Poltz (98 Pounder, 2007)
- Traveling (98 Pounder, 2008)
- Unraveling (98 Pounder, 2008)
- Dreamhouse (98 Pounder, 2010)
- Noineen Noiny Noin (Arrival Records Ltd, 2012)
- Running Wild: The Life of Dayton O. Hyde (Original Motion Picture Soundtrack) (Arrival Records Ltd, 2013)
- The Accident (98 Pounder, 2014)
- Live at the Belly Up (2015)
- Folksinger (98 Pounder, 2015)
- Shine On (Red House Records, 2019)
- Stardust & Satellites (Red House Records, 2022)

== Singles ==
- "Silver Lining" (Mercury, 1998)
- "You Were Meant for Me" (2013)
- "Hey God I'll Trade You Donald Trump for Leonard Cohen" (2017)
- "Born in a Band" (2017)
- "Devices" (2018)
- "Ballin' On A Wednesday" (2019)
- "Pharmacist" (2019)
- "Quarantine Blues" (2020)
- "Conveyor Belt" (2021)
- "Miles In My Heart" (2022)
- "Can O' Pop" (2022)
