= Mike Keneally =

American musician (born 1961)

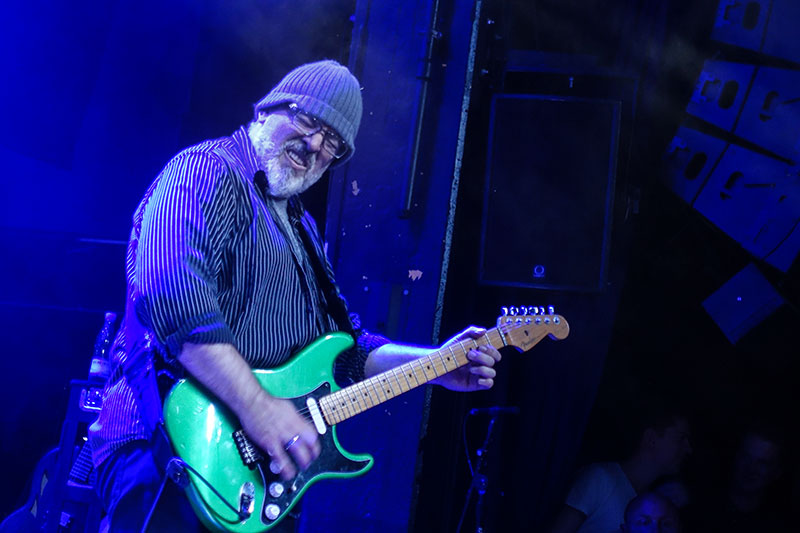
- Keneally performing with Joe Satriani, Denmark 2016

Background information
- Born: Michael Joseph Keneally; December 20, 1961 (age 64); Long Island, New York United States
- Genres: Hard rock, progressive rock, art rock, melodic death metal
- Occupations: Musician, songwriter
- Instruments: Vocals, guitar, keyboards, bass, drums
- Years active: 1985–present
- Labels: Immune, Exowax Recordings
- Website: www.keneally.com

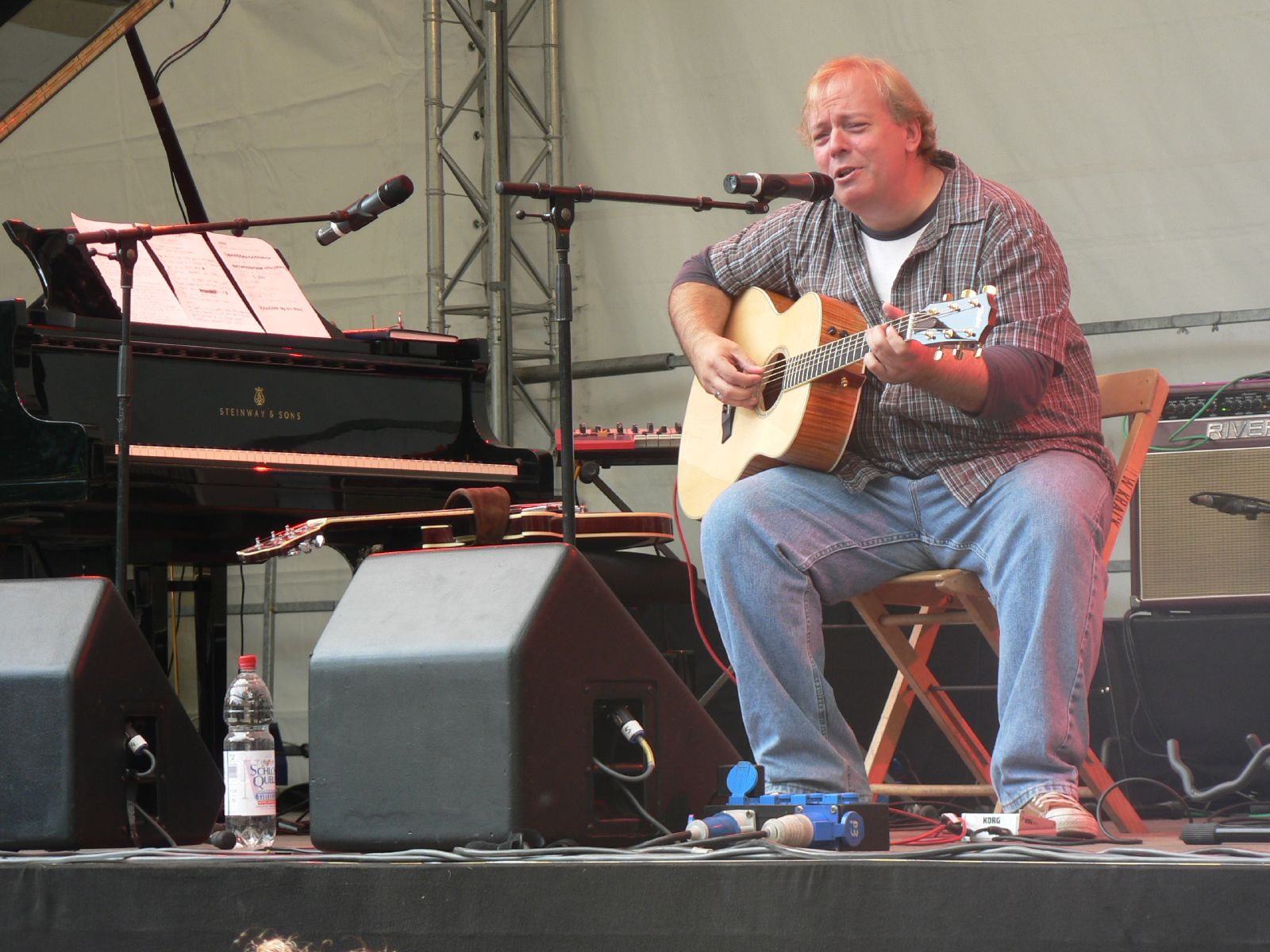
Keneally performing in 2007

Michael Joseph Keneally (born December 20, 1961) is an American guitarist, keyboardist, vocalist and composer. Keneally leads his own band, and is also known for a stint with Frank Zappa and for extensive work as a session musician with a range of performers.

== Early years and musical influences ==
Keneally started playing music at the age of 7 when he received an electric organ for his birthday. He also received a guitar on his eleventh birthday, and plays bass and drums as well. His early childhood musical influences included the Beatles and theme music from cartoon and television shows such as The Wallace and Ladmo Show and 2001: A Space Odyssey.

== Career ==
Born on Long Island, New York, he moved to San Diego, California at an early age and has been present on the local music scene there since 1985, when he formed the local cult band Drop Control. Although a well established musician, Keneally is probably most well known as former Frank Zappa "stunt guitarist" and a Zappa 1988 tour band member on both guitar and keyboards. Keneally's appointment to that role was secured by his command of Zappa's vast and difficult-to-play repertoire.

Keneally had called Zappa and said that he was "extremely familiar with all of his material and that he would be ready to play any of it for him given a short amount of preparation time", as he had already "been listening to Zappa's music for 16 years". "On the phone the day before the audition Frank had told me to have 'What's New in Baltimore?' and 'Sinister Footwear' ready for the next day's audition". On the way to the audition Keneally practiced the aforementioned songs, as well as "Little House I Used to Live in", and "every single Zappa melody I could think of, kind of as an exercise for my memory" as his brother Marty was driving the car.

Keneally's stint in the Zappa touring band was short-lived, with the early cancellation of the 1988 tour and Zappa's death in 1993. Keneally moved on from the elder Zappa's band to work with the eldest Zappa son, Dweezil, on his solo albums and work released as the band Z.

Keneally has also released 11 albums of solo material since 1992 and has guested or acted as sideman on a wide variety of projects, most notably as part of Steve Vai's touring bands. He has played guitar and keyboards with Yo Miles!, Wadada Leo Smith, Norwegian legends Ulver and Henry Kaiser's Miles Davis tribute band as well as recording the 1995 album The Mistakes with Henry Kaiser, Prairie Prince, and Andy West (formerly of Dixie Dregs). He has also produced albums for several bands, including Chris Opperman's debut album, Oppy Music, Vol. I: Purple, Crayon.

In 1998 Vai requested that Keneally arrange and perform an album of Vai's music on acoustic piano. Recorded in 1999, the album was finally released in 2004 as Vai Piano Reductions, Vol. 1: Performed by Mike Keneally. According to liner notes, Vai selected the songs, produced the album, and mixed it, releasing it on his own Light Without Heat label. As of 2008 Keneally has arranged from multi-tracked guitar parts to single-track piano the 12 songs selected by Steve and begun work on a second volume of Vai "Piano Reductions".

On May 1, 2007, Keneally's Exowax label re-released his debut album hat. and Boil That Dust Speck as deluxe, remastered double disc versions. A remixed and remastered edition of Sluggo! followed in 2013. Exowax has obtained Keneally's entire back catalog from Immune Records. Planned releases included Half Alive in Hollywood, as well as the Mike Keneally and Beer for Dolphins 1996 VHS release Soap Scum Remover, which will be remixed and remastered for a DVD release, and the Mistakes, his 1995 side project with Henry Kaiser on guitar and Synclavier, bassist Andy West and drummer Prairie Prince, along with a live Mistakes recording that has been held on the side until Keneally was able to re-acquire the rights to the original album.

On November 28, 2006, Keneally announced that he had been hired as National Music Director for The Paul Green School of Rock Music.

He has also toured with Dethklok as a guitarist and backing vocalist.

On July 20, 2008, at El Cajon, Calif., Keneally played a concert as part of "the most exciting power trio in years," Keneally • Minnemann • Beller (KMB), consisting of Mike, drummer Marco Minnemann and long-time collaborating bassist Bryan Beller. The band undertook a full tour in 2009 and became Joe Satriani's worldwide touring band in 2013.

In August 2009, Keneally released a video for a new solo track, "Hallmark", from Scambot 1, the first part of a planned three-album series.

In June 2010, Keneally entered Skywalker Sound as part of the studio band for Joe Satriani's new solo project, along with regular Satriani drummer Jeff Campitelli and bassist Allen Whitman (of San Francisco's surf/psychedelic group the Mermen). This same lineup was scheduled to tour in October and November 2010 in support of the album; however Keneally was replaced by English keyboardist Jem Godfrey for two dates on the UK leg of the tour.

In July 2012, Keneally released Wing Beat Fantastic: Songs written by Mike Keneally & Andy Partridge, a collaborative album consisting primarily of songs co-written with XTC's Andy Partridge during two writing sessions in 2006 and 2008, and of whose band and work Keneally has been a longtime fan (there is a small section of XTC's "Mayor of Simpleton" in the song "Day of the Cow 2" from his 1992 debut solo album hat.)

In August 2014, Keneally participated in the G4 Experience—a week-long guitar camp—with fellow guitarists Satriani, Paul Gilbert, and Andy Timmons.

== Current Mike Keneally Band line-up ==
- Mike Keneally - guitar, keys, lead vocals
- Bryan Beller - bass, backing vocals
- Rick Musallam - guitar, bouzouki, backing vocals
- Griff Peters - guitars
- Joe Travers, Marco Minnemann, or Nick D'Virgilio, as availability dictates - drums

Keneally has performed in Europe in the years 2002 - 2004 and since 2016 with finnish bass player Jaan Wessman and german drummer Schroeder billed initially as "Mike Keneally and Friends". In July/August 2017 the trio changed its name to the "Mike Keneally Report" and performed numerous shows both as headliner as well as supporting Kenny Wayne Shepherd and JJ Grey & Mofro.

== Discography ==
- hat. (1992)
- Boil That Dust Speck (1994)
- The Mistakes (1995)
- Half Alive in Hollywood (1997)
- Sluggo! (1997)
- The Tar Tapes, Vol. 1 (1997)
- The Tar Tapes, Vol. 2 (1998)
- Nonkertompf (1999)
- Nonkertalk (1999)
- Dancing (2000)
- Dancing With Myself ... and Others (2000)
- Wooden Smoke (2002)
- Wooden Smoke Asleep (2002)
- Dog (2004)
- Pup (2004)
- The Universe Will Provide (2004)
- Parallel Universe (2004)
- Vai Piano Reductions Vol. 1, Performed by Mike Keneally (2004)
- Guitar Therapy Live (2005)
- Wine and Pickles (2008)
- Scambot 1 (2009)
- Stories and Songs Inspired by Scambot 1 (2009)
- The Scambot Holiday Special (2009)
- Evidence of Humanity (2010)
- Elements of a Manatee (2010)
- Bakin' @ the Potato! (2010)
- Wing Beat Fantastic: Songs Written by Mike Keneally and Andy Partridge (2012)
- Wing Beat Elastic: Remixes, Demos and Unheard Music (2012)
- You Must Be This Tall (2013)
- Live at Mama Kin (2013)
- Free EP Volume 1 (2013)
- Free EP Volume 2 (2013)
- Dancing Demos (2014)
- Scambot 2 (2016)
- Inkling (2016)
- The Thing That Knowledge Can't Eat (2023)
