= G3 (tour) =

Annual concert tour organized by Joe Satriani

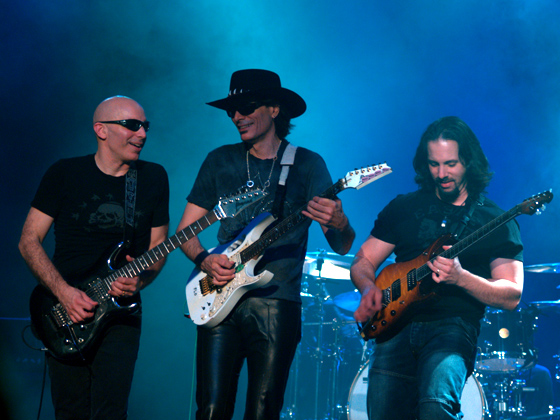
Joe Satriani, Steve Vai and John Petrucci at the Regent Theatre in Melbourne, Australia, December 2006

G3 is a concert tour organized by guitarist Joe Satriani featuring him alongside two other guitarists. Since its inception in 1995 G3 has toured most years and has featured many guitarists, including Steve Vai (Satriani's former student), Eric Johnson, Kenny Wayne Shepherd, Yngwie Malmsteen, John Petrucci, Robert Fripp, Paul Gilbert, Steve Morse, Steve Lukather, Uli Jon Roth, Michael Schenker, Adrian Legg, Phil Collen and many other special guests, including Tony MacAlpine, Johnny Hiland, Keith More, Chris Duarte, Andy Timmons, Neal Schon, Gary Hoey, Brian May, Billy Gibbons, Johnny A, George Lynch, Patrick Rondat, Guthrie Govan, Alejandro Silva, and Eric Sardinas.

== 1996 ==
The first tour took place in 1996. The North American G3 tour featured Joe Satriani, Steve Vai, and Eric Johnson. Performances were held from October 11, 1996 to November 8, 1996. Kenny Wayne Shepherd and Adrian Legg were the opening acts.

There were special guests on this tour, who included Neal Schon in San Francisco, Gary Hoey in San Diego, Chris Duarte in Austin and San Antonio, George Lynch in Phoenix, and Andy Timmons in Dallas. Al and Janie Hendrix (Jimi Hendrix's father and stepsister) came backstage on the last date of the G3 Tour in Hendrix's home town of Seattle, WA.

G3 1996 setlist
Appearance As	Performer	Song	Musicians
Opening Act	Kenny Wayne Shepherd	"Down to the Bone"	Noah Hunt – vocals; Kenny Wayne Shepherd – lead guitar; Joe Nadeau – rhythm guitar; Robby Emerson – bass; Jimmy Wallace – keyboards; Sam Bryant – drums
Opening Act	Kenny Wayne Shepherd	"Born with a Broken Heart"	Noah Hunt – vocals; Kenny Wayne Shepherd – lead guitar; Joe Nadeau – rhythm guitar; Robby Emerson – bass; Jimmy Wallace – keyboards; Sam Bryant – drums
Opening Act	Kenny Wayne Shepherd	"Shame, Shame, Shame"	Noah Hunt – vocals; Kenny Wayne Shepherd – lead guitar; Joe Nadeau – rhythm guitar; Robby Emerson – bass; Jimmy Wallace – keyboards; Sam Bryant – drums
Opening Act	Kenny Wayne Shepherd	"Kings Highway"	Noah Hunt – vocals; Kenny Wayne Shepherd – lead guitar; Joe Nadeau – rhythm guitar; Robby Emerson – bass; Jimmy Wallace – keyboards; Sam Bryant – drums
Opening Act	Kenny Wayne Shepherd	"Deja Voodoo"	Noah Hunt – vocals; Kenny Wayne Shepherd – lead guitar; Joe Nadeau – rhythm guitar; Robby Emerson – bass; Jimmy Wallace – keyboards; Sam Bryant – drums
Opening Act	Kenny Wayne Shepherd	"While We Cry"	Noah Hunt – vocals; Kenny Wayne Shepherd – lead guitar; Joe Nadeau – rhythm guitar; Robby Emerson – bass; Jimmy Wallace – keyboards; Sam Bryant – drums
Opening Act	Kenny Wayne Shepherd	"Voodoo Child (Slight Return)"	Noah Hunt – vocals; Kenny Wayne Shepherd – lead guitar; Joe Nadeau – rhythm guitar; Robby Emerson – bass; Jimmy Wallace – keyboards; Sam Bryant – drums
Opening Act	Adrian Legg	"Celandine"	Adrian Legg – guitar
Opening Act	Adrian Legg	"Cool Cajun"	Adrian Legg – guitar
Opening Act	Adrian Legg	"Crockett Waltz"	Adrian Legg – guitar
Opening Act	Adrian Legg	"Mrs. Jacks Last Stand"	Adrian Legg – guitar
Opening Act	Adrian Legg	"Tracy’s Big Moment"	Adrian Legg – guitar
Opening Act	Adrian Legg	"Chicken Licken's Last Ride"	Adrian Legg – guitar
Main Performer	Steve Vai	"There's a Fire in the House"	Steve Vai – lead guitar; Mike Keneally – rhythm guitar, sitar, keyboards; Philip Bynoe – bass, percussion; Mike Mangini – drums, percussion
Main Performer	Steve Vai	"The Animal"	Steve Vai – lead guitar; Mike Keneally – rhythm guitar, sitar, keyboards; Philip Bynoe – bass, percussion; Mike Mangini – drums, percussion
Main Performer	Steve Vai	"Deepness"	Steve Vai – lead guitar; Mike Keneally – rhythm guitar, sitar, keyboards; Philip Bynoe – bass, percussion; Mike Mangini – drums, percussion
Main Performer	Steve Vai	"Tender Surrender"	Steve Vai – lead guitar; Mike Keneally – rhythm guitar, sitar, keyboards; Philip Bynoe – bass, percussion; Mike Mangini – drums, percussion
Main Performer	Steve Vai	"Little Alligator"	Steve Vai – lead guitar; Mike Keneally – rhythm guitar, sitar, keyboards; Philip Bynoe – bass, percussion; Mike Mangini – drums, percussion
Main Performer	Steve Vai	"Bad Horsie"	Steve Vai – lead guitar; Mike Keneally – rhythm guitar, sitar, keyboards; Philip Bynoe – bass, percussion; Mike Mangini – drums, percussion
Main Performer	Steve Vai	"Answers"	Steve Vai – lead guitar; Mike Keneally – rhythm guitar, sitar, keyboards; Philip Bynoe – bass, percussion; Mike Mangini – drums, percussion
Main Performer	Steve Vai	"For the Love of God"	Steve Vai – lead guitar; Mike Keneally – rhythm guitar, sitar, keyboards; Philip Bynoe – bass, percussion; Mike Mangini – drums, percussion
Main Performer	Steve Vai	"The Attitude Song"	Steve Vai – lead guitar; Mike Keneally – rhythm guitar, sitar, keyboards; Philip Bynoe – bass, percussion; Mike Mangini – drums, percussion
Main Performer	Eric Johnson	"12 to 12 Vibe"	Eric Johnson – guitar; Roscoe Beck – bass; Stephen Barber – keyboards; Brannen Temple – drums
Main Performer	Eric Johnson	"Righteous"	Eric Johnson – guitar; Roscoe Beck – bass; Stephen Barber – keyboards; Brannen Temple – drums
Main Performer	Eric Johnson	"Rock Me Baby"	Eric Johnson – guitar; Roscoe Beck – bass; Stephen Barber – keyboards; Brannen Temple – drums
Main Performer	Eric Johnson	"Zap"	Eric Johnson – guitar; Roscoe Beck – bass; Stephen Barber – keyboards; Brannen Temple – drums
Main Performer	Eric Johnson	"Manhattan"	Eric Johnson – guitar; Roscoe Beck – bass; Stephen Barber – keyboards; Brannen Temple – drums
Main Performer	Eric Johnson	"SRV"	Eric Johnson – guitar; Roscoe Beck – bass; Stephen Barber – keyboards; Brannen Temple – drums
Main Performer	Eric Johnson	"Good To Me"	Eric Johnson – guitar; Roscoe Beck – bass; Stephen Barber – keyboards; Brannen Temple – drums
Main Performer	Eric Johnson	"Camel's Night Out"	Eric Johnson – guitar; Roscoe Beck – bass; Stephen Barber – keyboards; Brannen Temple – drums
Main Performer	Eric Johnson	"Cliffs of Dover"	Eric Johnson – guitar; Roscoe Beck – bass; Stephen Barber – keyboards; Brannen Temple – drums
Main Performer	Joe Satriani	"Cool #9"	Joe Satriani – guitar, vocals; Stu Hamm – bass; Jeff Campitelli – drums
Main Performer	Joe Satriani	"Flying in a Blue Dream"	Joe Satriani – guitar, vocals; Stu Hamm – bass; Jeff Campitelli – drums
Main Performer	Joe Satriani	"Summer Song"	Joe Satriani – guitar, vocals; Stu Hamm – bass; Jeff Campitelli – drums
Main Performer	Joe Satriani	"The Crush of Love"	Joe Satriani – guitar, vocals; Stu Hamm – bass; Jeff Campitelli – drums
Main Performer	Joe Satriani	"The Extremist"	Joe Satriani – guitar, vocals; Stu Hamm – bass; Jeff Campitelli – drums
Main Performer	Joe Satriani	"Always with Me, Always with You"	Joe Satriani – guitar, vocals; Stu Hamm – bass; Jeff Campitelli – drums
Main Performer	Joe Satriani	"Satch Boogie"	Joe Satriani – guitar, vocals; Stu Hamm – bass; Jeff Campitelli – drums
Main Performer	Joe Satriani	"Big Bad Moon"	Joe Satriani – guitar, vocals; Stu Hamm – bass; Jeff Campitelli – drums
Main Performer	Joe Satriani	"Surfing with the Alien"	Joe Satriani – guitar, vocals; Stu Hamm – bass; Jeff Campitelli – drums
Main Performer	G3 Jam	"Going Down"	Joe Satriani – guitar, lead vocals; Steve Vai – guitar, backing vocals; Eric Johnson – guitar; Stu Hamm – bass; Jeff Campitelli – drums
Main Performer	G3 Jam	"My Guitar Wants to Kill Your Mama"	Mike Keneally – vocals; Steve Vai – guitar, vocals; Joe Satriani – guitar; Eric Johnson – guitar; Stu Hamm – bass; Jeff Campitelli – drums
Main Performer	G3 Jam	"Red House"	Eric Johnson – guitar, vocals; Joe Satriani – guitar; Steve Vai – guitar; Stu Hamm – bass; Jeff Campitelli – drums

== 1997 ==
Toured North America featuring Satriani, Shepherd, Fripp and Europe, featuring Satriani, Vai, Legg. Michel Cusson played the first two shows in Quebec City and Montreal before Shepherd joined the tour.

G3 1997 setlist
Continent	Performer	Song	Musicians
North America	Robert Fripp	Robert Fripp Soundscape Prelude to G3	Robert Fripp – guitar; Mike Keneally
North America	Kenny Wayne Shepherd	"Down to the Bone"	Noah Hunt – vocals; Kenny Wayne Shepherd – lead guitar; Joe Nadeau – rhythm guitar; Robby Emerson – bass; Jimmy Wallace – keyboards; Sam Bryant – drums
North America	Kenny Wayne Shepherd	"Born with a Broken Heart"	Noah Hunt – vocals; Kenny Wayne Shepherd – lead guitar; Joe Nadeau – rhythm guitar; Robby Emerson – bass; Jimmy Wallace – keyboards; Sam Bryant – drums
North America	Kenny Wayne Shepherd	"Shame, Shame, Shame"	Noah Hunt – vocals; Kenny Wayne Shepherd – lead guitar; Joe Nadeau – rhythm guitar; Robby Emerson – bass; Jimmy Wallace – keyboards; Sam Bryant – drums
North America	Kenny Wayne Shepherd	"Kings Highway"	Noah Hunt – vocals; Kenny Wayne Shepherd – lead guitar; Joe Nadeau – rhythm guitar; Robby Emerson – bass; Jimmy Wallace – keyboards; Sam Bryant – drums
North America	Kenny Wayne Shepherd	"Deja Voodoo"	Noah Hunt – vocals; Kenny Wayne Shepherd – lead guitar; Joe Nadeau – rhythm guitar; Robby Emerson – bass; Jimmy Wallace – keyboards; Sam Bryant – drums
North America	Kenny Wayne Shepherd	"Voodoo Child (Slight Return)"	Noah Hunt – vocals; Kenny Wayne Shepherd – lead guitar; Joe Nadeau – rhythm guitar; Robby Emerson – bass; Jimmy Wallace – keyboards; Sam Bryant – drums
North America	Joe Satriani	"Cool #9"	Joe Satriani – guitar, vocals; Stu Hamm – bass; Jeff Campitelli – drums
North America	Joe Satriani	"Ice 9"	Joe Satriani – guitar, vocals; Stu Hamm – bass; Jeff Campitelli – drums
North America	Joe Satriani	"Summer Song"	Joe Satriani – guitar, vocals; Stu Hamm – bass; Jeff Campitelli – drums
North America	Joe Satriani	"Flying in a Blue Dream"	Joe Satriani – guitar, vocals; Stu Hamm – bass; Jeff Campitelli – drums
North America	Joe Satriani	"The Mystical Potato Head Groove Thing"	Joe Satriani – guitar, vocals; Stu Hamm – bass; Jeff Campitelli – drums
North America	Joe Satriani	"Always with Me, Always with You"	Joe Satriani – guitar, vocals; Stu Hamm – bass; Jeff Campitelli – drums
North America	Joe Satriani	"Big Bad Moon" "Bass Solo"	Joe Satriani – guitar, vocals; Stu Hamm – bass; Jeff Campitelli – drums
North America	Joe Satriani	"Satch Boogie"	Joe Satriani – guitar, vocals; Stu Hamm – bass; Jeff Campitelli – drums
North America	Joe Satriani	"Surfing with the Alien"	Joe Satriani – guitar, vocals; Stu Hamm – bass; Jeff Campitelli – drums
North America	G3 Jam	"Levee Break"	Joe Satriani – guitar, vocals; Kenny Wayne Shepherd – guitar; Robert Fripp – guitar; Stu Hamm – bass; Jeff Campitelli – drums
North America	G3 Jam	"My Guitar Wants to Kill Your Mama"	Noah Hunt – vocals; Kenny Wayne Shepherd – guitar, vocals; Joe Satriani – guitar; Robert Fripp – guitar; Stu Hamm – bass; Jeff Campitelli – drums
North America	G3 Jam	"Red House"	Robert Fripp – guitar, vocals; Joe Satriani – guitar; Kenny Wayne Shepherd – guitar; Stu Hamm – bass; Jeff Campitelli – drums
Europe	Adrian Legg	"Celandine"	Adrian Legg – guitar
Europe	Adrian Legg	"English Cajun"	Adrian Legg – guitar
Europe	Adrian Legg	"Kalahari Blues"	Adrian Legg – guitar
Europe	Adrian Legg	"Ragged Nail"	Adrian Legg – guitar
Europe	Adrian Legg	"L'Amour Manque"	Adrian Legg – guitar
Europe	Adrian Legg	"Queenies Waltz"	Adrian Legg – guitar
Europe	Adrian Legg	"Cool Cajun"	Adrian Legg – guitar
Europe	Adrian Legg	"Mrs. Jack's Last Stand"	Adrian Legg – guitar
Europe	Adrian Legg	"Tracey's Big Moment"	Adrian Legg – guitar
Europe	Adrian Legg	"Chicken Licken's Last Ride"	Adrian Legg – guitar
Europe	Steve Vai	"There's a Fire in the House"	Steve Vai – lead guitar; Mike Keneally – rhythm guitar, keyboards; Philip Bynoe – bass; Mike Mangini – drums
Europe	Steve Vai	"The Animal"	Steve Vai – lead guitar; Mike Keneally – rhythm guitar, keyboards; Philip Bynoe – bass; Mike Mangini – drums
Europe	Steve Vai	"Deepness"	Steve Vai – lead guitar; Mike Keneally – rhythm guitar, keyboards; Philip Bynoe – bass; Mike Mangini – drums
Europe	Steve Vai	"Tender Surrender"	Steve Vai – lead guitar; Mike Keneally – rhythm guitar, keyboards; Philip Bynoe – bass; Mike Mangini – drums
Europe	Steve Vai	"Aching Hunger"	Steve Vai – lead guitar; Mike Keneally – rhythm guitar, keyboards; Philip Bynoe – bass; Mike Mangini – drums
Europe	Steve Vai	"Angel Food"	Steve Vai – lead guitar; Mike Keneally – rhythm guitar, keyboards; Philip Bynoe – bass; Mike Mangini – drums
Europe	Steve Vai	"Answers"	Steve Vai – lead guitar; Mike Keneally – rhythm guitar, keyboards; Philip Bynoe – bass; Mike Mangini – drums
Europe	Steve Vai	"Conducting & Ballerina?"	Steve Vai – lead guitar; Mike Keneally – rhythm guitar, keyboards; Philip Bynoe – bass; Mike Mangini – drums
Europe	Steve Vai	"For the Love of God"	Steve Vai – lead guitar; Mike Keneally – rhythm guitar, keyboards; Philip Bynoe – bass; Mike Mangini – drums
Europe	Steve Vai	"The Attitude Song"	Steve Vai – lead guitar; Mike Keneally – rhythm guitar, keyboards; Philip Bynoe – bass; Mike Mangini – drums
Europe	Joe Satriani	"Cool #9"	Joe Satriani – guitar, vocals; Stu Hamm – bass; Jeff Campitelli – drums
Europe	Joe Satriani	"Ice 9"	Joe Satriani – guitar, vocals; Stu Hamm – bass; Jeff Campitelli – drums
Europe	Joe Satriani	"Summer Song"	Joe Satriani – guitar, vocals; Stu Hamm – bass; Jeff Campitelli – drums
Europe	Joe Satriani	"Flying in a Blue Dream"	Joe Satriani – guitar, vocals; Stu Hamm – bass; Jeff Campitelli – drums
Europe	Joe Satriani	"The Mystical Potato Head Groove Thing"	Joe Satriani – guitar, vocals; Stu Hamm – bass; Jeff Campitelli – drums
Europe	Joe Satriani	"Always with Me, Always with You"	Joe Satriani – guitar, vocals; Stu Hamm – bass; Jeff Campitelli – drums
Europe	Joe Satriani	"Big Bad Moon" "Bass Solo"	Joe Satriani – guitar, vocals; Stu Hamm – bass; Jeff Campitelli – drums
Europe	Joe Satriani	"Satch Boogie"	Joe Satriani – guitar, vocals; Stu Hamm – bass; Jeff Campitelli – drums
Europe	Joe Satriani	"Surfing with the Alien"	Joe Satriani – guitar, vocals; Stu Hamm – bass; Jeff Campitelli – drums
Europe	G3 Jam	"Levee Break"	Joe Satriani – guitar, vocals; Steve Vai – guitar; Adrian Legg – guitar; Stu Hamm – bass; Jeff Campitelli – drums
Europe	G3 Jam	"My Guitar Wants to Kill Your Mama"	Mike Keneally – vocals; Steve Vai – guitar, vocals; Joe Satriani – guitar; Adrian Legg – guitar; Stu Hamm – bass; Jeff Campitelli – drums
Europe	G3 Jam	"Red House"	Adrian Legg – guitar, vocals; Joe Satriani – guitar; Steve Vai – guitar; Stu Hamm – bass; Jeff Campitelli – drums

== 1998 ==
Toured Europe.

Patrick Rondat was also present on the G3 Tour dates in France.

G3 1998 setlist
Performer	Song	Musicians
Michael Schenker	"In Search of Peace of Mind"	David Van Landing – vocals; Gary Barden – vocals; Michael Schenker – lead guitar; Seth Bernstein – rhythm guitar, keyboards; Jeff Kollman – bass; Shane Gaalaas – drums
Michael Schenker	"Assault Attack"	David Van Landing – vocals; Gary Barden – vocals; Michael Schenker – lead guitar; Seth Bernstein – rhythm guitar, keyboards; Jeff Kollman – bass; Shane Gaalaas – drums
Michael Schenker	"Into the Arena"	David Van Landing – vocals; Gary Barden – vocals; Michael Schenker – lead guitar; Seth Bernstein – rhythm guitar, keyboards; Jeff Kollman – bass; Shane Gaalaas – drums
Michael Schenker	"Another Piece of Meat"	David Van Landing – vocals; Gary Barden – vocals; Michael Schenker – lead guitar; Seth Bernstein – rhythm guitar, keyboards; Jeff Kollman – bass; Shane Gaalaas – drums
Michael Schenker	"Let It Roll"	David Van Landing – vocals; Gary Barden – vocals; Michael Schenker – lead guitar; Seth Bernstein – rhythm guitar, keyboards; Jeff Kollman – bass; Shane Gaalaas – drums
Michael Schenker	"Captain Nemo"	David Van Landing – vocals; Gary Barden – vocals; Michael Schenker – lead guitar; Seth Bernstein – rhythm guitar, keyboards; Jeff Kollman – bass; Shane Gaalaas – drums
Michael Schenker	"Written in the Sand"	David Van Landing – vocals; Gary Barden – vocals; Michael Schenker – lead guitar; Seth Bernstein – rhythm guitar, keyboards; Jeff Kollman – bass; Shane Gaalaas – drums
Michael Schenker	"Essence"	David Van Landing – vocals; Gary Barden – vocals; Michael Schenker – lead guitar; Seth Bernstein – rhythm guitar, keyboards; Jeff Kollman – bass; Shane Gaalaas – drums
Michael Schenker	"Lost Horizons"	David Van Landing – vocals; Gary Barden – vocals; Michael Schenker – lead guitar; Seth Bernstein – rhythm guitar, keyboards; Jeff Kollman – bass; Shane Gaalaas – drums
Michael Schenker	"Attack of the Mad Axeman"	David Van Landing – vocals; Gary Barden – vocals; Michael Schenker – lead guitar; Seth Bernstein – rhythm guitar, keyboards; Jeff Kollman – bass; Shane Gaalaas – drums
Michael Schenker	"Bijou Pleasurette"	David Van Landing – vocals; Gary Barden – vocals; Michael Schenker – lead guitar; Seth Bernstein – rhythm guitar, keyboards; Jeff Kollman – bass; Shane Gaalaas – drums
Michael Schenker	"Positive Forward"	David Van Landing – vocals; Gary Barden – vocals; Michael Schenker – lead guitar; Seth Bernstein – rhythm guitar, keyboards; Jeff Kollman – bass; Shane Gaalaas – drums
Michael Schenker	"Armed and Ready"	David Van Landing – vocals; Gary Barden – vocals; Michael Schenker – lead guitar; Seth Bernstein – rhythm guitar, keyboards; Jeff Kollman – bass; Shane Gaalaas – drums
Uli Jon Roth	"G3 Overture"	Liz Vandall – vocals; Uli Jon Roth – guitar; Patrice Guers – bass; Don Airey – keyboards; Clive Bunker – drums
Uli Jon Roth	"The Four Seasons Part I"	Liz Vandall – vocals; Uli Jon Roth – guitar; Patrice Guers – bass; Don Airey – keyboards; Clive Bunker – drums
Uli Jon Roth	"The Four Seasons Part II"	Liz Vandall – vocals; Uli Jon Roth – guitar; Patrice Guers – bass; Don Airey – keyboards; Clive Bunker – drums
Uli Jon Roth	"Hiroshima"	Liz Vandall – vocals; Uli Jon Roth – guitar; Patrice Guers – bass; Don Airey – keyboards; Clive Bunker – drums
Uli Jon Roth	"Polar Nights"	Liz Vandall – vocals; Uli Jon Roth – guitar; Patrice Guers – bass; Don Airey – keyboards; Clive Bunker – drums
Uli Jon Roth	"Beethoven's Fifth"	Liz Vandall – vocals; Uli Jon Roth – guitar; Patrice Guers – bass; Don Airey – keyboards; Clive Bunker – drums
Joe Satriani	"Up in the Sky"	Joe Satriani – guitar, vocals; Stuart Hamm – bass; Jeff Campitelli – drums
Joe Satriani	"House Full of Bullets"	Joe Satriani – guitar, vocals; Stuart Hamm – bass; Jeff Campitelli – drums
Joe Satriani	"Crystal Planet"	Joe Satriani – guitar, vocals; Stuart Hamm – bass; Jeff Campitelli – drums
Joe Satriani	"Time"	Joe Satriani – guitar, vocals; Stuart Hamm – bass; Jeff Campitelli – drums
Joe Satriani	"Raspberry Jam Delta-V"	Joe Satriani – guitar, vocals; Stuart Hamm – bass; Jeff Campitelli – drums
Joe Satriani	"Lights of Heaven"	Joe Satriani – guitar, vocals; Stuart Hamm – bass; Jeff Campitelli – drums
Joe Satriani	"Ice 9"	Joe Satriani – guitar, vocals; Stuart Hamm – bass; Jeff Campitelli – drums
Joe Satriani	"The Mystical Potato Head Groove Thing"	Joe Satriani – guitar, vocals; Stuart Hamm – bass; Jeff Campitelli – drums
Joe Satriani	"Summer Song"	Joe Satriani – guitar, vocals; Stuart Hamm – bass; Jeff Campitelli – drums
Joe Satriani	"Always with Me, Always with You"	Joe Satriani – guitar, vocals; Stuart Hamm – bass; Jeff Campitelli – drums
Joe Satriani	"Big Bad Moon" "Bass Solo"	Joe Satriani – guitar, vocals; Stuart Hamm – bass; Jeff Campitelli – drums
Joe Satriani	"Satch Boogie"	Joe Satriani – guitar, vocals; Stuart Hamm – bass; Jeff Campitelli – drums
Joe Satriani	"Slow Down Blues"	Joe Satriani – guitar, vocals; Stuart Hamm – bass; Jeff Campitelli – drums
Joe Satriani	"Surfing with the Alien"	Joe Satriani – guitar, vocals; Stuart Hamm – bass; Jeff Campitelli – drums
G3 Jam	"Going Down"	Joe Satriani – guitar, vocals; Michael Schenker – guitar; Uli Jon Roth – guitar; Keith More – guitar; Stu Hamm – bass; Jeff Campitelli – drums
G3 Jam	"The Thrill Is Gone"	Gary Barden – vocals; Joe Satriani – guitar; Michael Schenker – guitar; Uli Jon Roth – guitar; Keith More – guitar; Stu Hamm – bass; Jeff Campitelli – drums
G3 Jam	"Voodoo Child (Slight Return)"	David Van Landing – vocals; Joe Satriani – guitar; Michael Schenker – guitar; Uli Jon Roth – guitar; Keith More – guitar; Stu Hamm – bass; Jeff Campitelli – drums

== 2000 ==
Toured Rentak Rhythm of Asia Festival (Bukit Jalil) – Kuala Lumpur, MY. Featured a reunion of the first G3 Tour lineup on October 21, 2000 at the Rhythm of Asia Festival – Kuala Lumpur, MY. Slide guitarist Eric Sardinas opened.

G3 2000 setlist
Performer	Song	Musicians
Eric Johnson	"Zenland"	Eric Johnson – guitar, vocals; Chris Maresh – bass; Billy Maddox – drums
Eric Johnson	"Trail of Tears"	Eric Johnson – guitar, vocals; Chris Maresh – bass; Billy Maddox – drums
Eric Johnson	"Forty Mile Town"	Eric Johnson – guitar, vocals; Chris Maresh – bass; Billy Maddox – drums
Eric Johnson	"Trademark"	Eric Johnson – guitar, vocals; Chris Maresh – bass; Billy Maddox – drums
Eric Johnson	"Nothing Can Keep Me from You"	Eric Johnson – guitar, vocals; Chris Maresh – bass; Billy Maddox – drums
Eric Johnson	"Desert Rose"	Eric Johnson – guitar, vocals; Chris Maresh – bass; Billy Maddox – drums
Eric Johnson	"Cliffs of Dover"	Eric Johnson – guitar, vocals; Chris Maresh – bass; Billy Maddox – drums
Steve Vai	"I Know You're Here"	Steve Vai – lead guitar, vocals; Dave Weiner – rhythm guitar; Philip Bynoe – bass, percussion; Mike Keneally – keyboards, sitar, additional guitar; Mike Mangini – drums, percussion
Steve Vai	"The Reaper"	Steve Vai – lead guitar, vocals; Dave Weiner – rhythm guitar; Philip Bynoe – bass, percussion; Mike Keneally – keyboards, sitar, additional guitar; Mike Mangini – drums, percussion
Steve Vai	"Juice"	Steve Vai – lead guitar, vocals; Dave Weiner – rhythm guitar; Philip Bynoe – bass, percussion; Mike Keneally – keyboards, sitar, additional guitar; Mike Mangini – drums, percussion
Steve Vai	"Whispering a Prayer"	Steve Vai – lead guitar, vocals; Dave Weiner – rhythm guitar; Philip Bynoe – bass, percussion; Mike Keneally – keyboards, sitar, additional guitar; Mike Mangini – drums, percussion
Steve Vai	"Bangkok"	Steve Vai – lead guitar, vocals; Dave Weiner – rhythm guitar; Philip Bynoe – bass, percussion; Mike Keneally – keyboards, sitar, additional guitar; Mike Mangini – drums, percussion
Steve Vai	"I'm the Hell Outta Here"	Steve Vai – lead guitar, vocals; Dave Weiner – rhythm guitar; Philip Bynoe – bass, percussion; Mike Keneally – keyboards, sitar, additional guitar; Mike Mangini – drums, percussion
Steve Vai	"For the Love of God"	Steve Vai – lead guitar, vocals; Dave Weiner – rhythm guitar; Philip Bynoe – bass, percussion; Mike Keneally – keyboards, sitar, additional guitar; Mike Mangini – drums, percussion
Joe Satriani	"Devil's Slide"	Joe Satriani – guitar; Stu Hamm – bass; Jeff Campitelli – drums
Joe Satriani	"Flying in a Blue Dream"	Joe Satriani – guitar; Stu Hamm – bass; Jeff Campitelli – drums
Joe Satriani	"Satch Boogie"	Joe Satriani – guitar; Stu Hamm – bass; Jeff Campitelli – drums

== 2001–2002 ==
G3 2001 featured Joe Satriani and Steve Vai up with Dream Theater's John Petrucci, who wrote an entire set of new instrumental music for the tour, touring North America.

G3 2001–2002 setlist
Performer	Song	Musicians
John Petrucci	"IBS"	John Petrucci – guitar; Dave LaRue – bass; Mike Portnoy – drums
John Petrucci	"Damage Control"	John Petrucci – guitar; Dave LaRue – bass; Mike Portnoy – drums
John Petrucci	"Lost without You"	John Petrucci – guitar; Dave LaRue – bass; Mike Portnoy – drums
John Petrucci	"Glasgow Kiss"	John Petrucci – guitar; Dave LaRue – bass; Mike Portnoy – drums
John Petrucci	"Paradigm Shift"	John Petrucci – guitar; Dave LaRue – bass; Mike Portnoy – drums
Steve Vai	"Shy Boy"	Steve Vai – lead guitar; Dave Weiner – rhythm guitar; Billy Sheehan – bass, vocals; Mike Keneally – keyboards, additional guitar; Virgil Donati – drums
Steve Vai	"Giant Balls of Gold"	Steve Vai – lead guitar; Dave Weiner – rhythm guitar; Billy Sheehan – bass, vocals; Mike Keneally – keyboards, additional guitar; Virgil Donati – drums
Steve Vai	"Erotic Nightmares"	Steve Vai – lead guitar; Dave Weiner – rhythm guitar; Billy Sheehan – bass, vocals; Mike Keneally – keyboards, additional guitar; Virgil Donati – drums
Steve Vai	"Blood & Glory"	Steve Vai – lead guitar; Dave Weiner – rhythm guitar; Billy Sheehan – bass, vocals; Mike Keneally – keyboards, additional guitar; Virgil Donati – drums
Steve Vai	"The Animal"	Steve Vai – lead guitar; Dave Weiner – rhythm guitar; Billy Sheehan – bass, vocals; Mike Keneally – keyboards, additional guitar; Virgil Donati – drums
Steve Vai	"Whispering a Prayer"	Steve Vai – lead guitar; Dave Weiner – rhythm guitar; Billy Sheehan – bass, vocals; Mike Keneally – keyboards, additional guitar; Virgil Donati – drums
Steve Vai	"Incantation"	Steve Vai – lead guitar; Dave Weiner – rhythm guitar; Billy Sheehan – bass, vocals; Mike Keneally – keyboards, additional guitar; Virgil Donati – drums
Steve Vai	"Jiboom"	Steve Vai – lead guitar; Dave Weiner – rhythm guitar; Billy Sheehan – bass, vocals; Mike Keneally – keyboards, additional guitar; Virgil Donati – drums
Steve Vai	"For the Love of God"	Steve Vai – lead guitar; Dave Weiner – rhythm guitar; Billy Sheehan – bass, vocals; Mike Keneally – keyboards, additional guitar; Virgil Donati – drums
Joe Satriani	"Cool #9"	Joe Satriani – guitar; Stu Hamm – bass; Jeff Campitelli – drums
Joe Satriani	"Devil's Slide"	Joe Satriani – guitar; Stu Hamm – bass; Jeff Campitelli – drums
Joe Satriani	"Satch Boogie"	Joe Satriani – guitar; Stu Hamm – bass; Jeff Campitelli – drums
Joe Satriani	"Flying in a Blue Dream"	Joe Satriani – guitar; Stu Hamm – bass; Jeff Campitelli – drums
Joe Satriani	"Until We Say Goodbye"	Joe Satriani – guitar; Stu Hamm – bass; Jeff Campitelli – drums
Joe Satriani	"The Extremist"	Joe Satriani – guitar; Stu Hamm – bass; Jeff Campitelli – drums
Joe Satriani	"Raspberry Jam Delta-V"	Joe Satriani – guitar; Stu Hamm – bass; Jeff Campitelli – drums
Joe Satriani	"Always with Me, Always with You"	Joe Satriani – guitar; Stu Hamm – bass; Jeff Campitelli – drums
Joe Satriani	"Surfing with the Alien"	Joe Satriani – guitar; Stu Hamm – bass; Jeff Campitelli – drums
G3 Jam	"La Grange"	Billy Sheehan – vocals, bass; Joe Satriani – guitar; Steve Vai – guitar; John Petrucci – guitar; Stu Hamm – bass; Jeff Campitelli – drums
G3 Jam	"Voodoo Child (Slight Return)"	Billy Sheehan – vocals, bass; Joe Satriani – guitar; Steve Vai – guitar; John Petrucci – guitar; Dave LaRue – bass; Jeff Campitelli – drums
G3 Jam	"Little Wing"	Steve Vai – guitar, vocals; Joe Satriani – guitar; John Petrucci – guitar; Billy Sheehan – bass; Jeff Campitelli – drums
G3 Jam	"Going Down"	Joe Satriani – guitar, vocals; Steve Vai – guitar; John Petrucci – guitar; Stu Hamm – bass; Jeff Campitelli – drums

== 2003 ==
Joe Satriani, Steve Vai and Yngwie Malmsteen toured North America.

G3 2003 setlist
Performer	Song	Musicians
Joe Satriani	"Satch Boogie"	Joe Satriani – lead guitar; Galen Henson – rhythm guitar; Matt Bissonette – bass; Jeff Campitelli – drums
Joe Satriani	"The Extremist"	Joe Satriani – lead guitar; Galen Henson – rhythm guitar; Matt Bissonette – bass; Jeff Campitelli – drums
Joe Satriani	"Crystal Planet"	Joe Satriani – lead guitar; Galen Henson – rhythm guitar; Matt Bissonette – bass; Jeff Campitelli – drums
Joe Satriani	"Starry Night"	Joe Satriani – lead guitar; Galen Henson – rhythm guitar; Matt Bissonette – bass; Jeff Campitelli – drums
Joe Satriani	"Midnight"	Joe Satriani – lead guitar; Galen Henson – rhythm guitar; Matt Bissonette – bass; Jeff Campitelli – drums
Joe Satriani	"Flying in a Blue Dream"	Joe Satriani – lead guitar; Galen Henson – rhythm guitar; Matt Bissonette – bass; Jeff Campitelli – drums
Joe Satriani	"The Mystical Potato Head Groove Thing"	Joe Satriani – lead guitar; Galen Henson – rhythm guitar; Matt Bissonette – bass; Jeff Campitelli – drums
Joe Satriani	"Always with Me, Always with You"	Joe Satriani – lead guitar; Galen Henson – rhythm guitar; Matt Bissonette – bass; Jeff Campitelli – drums
Joe Satriani	"Summer Song"	Joe Satriani – lead guitar; Galen Henson – rhythm guitar; Matt Bissonette – bass; Jeff Campitelli – drums
Steve Vai	"I Know You’re Here"	Steve Vai – lead guitar, vocals; Dave Weiner – rhythm guitar; Billy Sheehan – bass; Tony MacAlpine – keyboards, guitar; Jeremy Colson – drums
Steve Vai	"Reaping"	Steve Vai – lead guitar, vocals; Dave Weiner – rhythm guitar; Billy Sheehan – bass; Tony MacAlpine – keyboards, guitar; Jeremy Colson – drums
Steve Vai	"Juice"	Steve Vai – lead guitar, vocals; Dave Weiner – rhythm guitar; Billy Sheehan – bass; Tony MacAlpine – keyboards, guitar; Jeremy Colson – drums
Steve Vai	"Whispering a Prayer"	Steve Vai – lead guitar, vocals; Dave Weiner – rhythm guitar; Billy Sheehan – bass; Tony MacAlpine – keyboards, guitar; Jeremy Colson – drums
Steve Vai	"I'm the Hell Outta Here"	Steve Vai – lead guitar, vocals; Dave Weiner – rhythm guitar; Billy Sheehan – bass; Tony MacAlpine – keyboards, guitar; Jeremy Colson – drums
Steve Vai	"For the Love of God"	Steve Vai – lead guitar, vocals; Dave Weiner – rhythm guitar; Billy Sheehan – bass; Tony MacAlpine – keyboards, guitar; Jeremy Colson – drums
Yngwie Malmsteen	"Evil Eye"	Yngwie Malmsteen – guitar; Mick Cervino – bass; Jocke Svalberg – keyboards; Patrick Johansson – drums
Yngwie Malmsteen	"Baroque n' Roll"	Yngwie Malmsteen – guitar; Mick Cervino – bass; Jocke Svalberg – keyboards; Patrick Johansson – drums
Yngwie Malmsteen	"Guitar Solo" ("Trilogy Suite Op. 5"/"Krakatau"/"Red House")	Yngwie Malmsteen – guitar
Yngwie Malmsteen	"Fugue (Concerto for Electric Guitar & Orchestra in E Flat Minor Opus 1)"	Yngwie Malmsteen – guitar; Mick Cervino – bass; Jocke Svalberg – keyboards; Patrick Johansson – drums
Yngwie Malmsteen	"Keyboard Solo"	Jocke Svalberg – keyboards
Yngwie Malmsteen	"Bass Solo"	Mick Cervino – bass
Yngwie Malmsteen	"Drum Solo"	Patrick Johansson – drums
Yngwie Malmsteen	"Nylon String Acoustic Guitar Solo"	Yngwie Malmsteen – guitar
Yngwie Malmsteen	"Black Star"	Yngwie Malmsteen – guitar; Mick Cervino – bass; Jocke Svalberg – keyboards; Patrick Johansson – drums
Yngwie Malmsteen	"Adagio" "Far Beyond the Sun"	Yngwie Malmsteen – guitar; Mick Cervino – bass; Jocke Svalberg – keyboards; Patrick Johansson – drums
Yngwie Malmsteen	"Finale"	Yngwie Malmsteen – guitar; Mick Cervino – bass; Jocke Svalberg – keyboards; Patrick Johansson – drums
Yngwie Malmsteen	"Blitzkrieg"	Yngwie Malmsteen – guitar; Mick Cervino – bass; Jocke Svalberg – keyboards; Patrick Johansson – drums
G3 Jam	"Rockin' in the Free World"	Joe Satriani – guitar, lead vocals; Steve Vai – guitar, backing vocals; Yngwie Malmsteen – guitar; Billy Sheehan – bass; Jeff Campitelli – drums
G3 Jam	"Little Wing"	Steve Vai – guitar, vocals; Joe Satriani – guitar; Yngwie Malmsteen – guitar; Billy Sheehan – bass; Jeff Campitelli – drums
G3 Jam	"Voodoo Child (Slight Return)"	Yngwie Malmsteen – guitar, vocals; Joe Satriani – guitar; Steve Vai – guitar; Billy Sheehan – bass; Jeff Campitelli – drums

== 2004 ==
G3 toured Europe, Mexico and South America in 2004 with Joe Satriani, Steve Vai and Robert Fripp.

G3 2004 setlist
Performer	Song	Musicians
Robert Fripp	"Soundscape Part 1"	Robert Fripp – guitar
Robert Fripp	"Soundscape Part 2"	Robert Fripp – guitar
Robert Fripp	"Soundscape Part 3"	Robert Fripp – guitar
Steve Vai	"I Know You're Here"	Steve Vai – lead guitar, vocals; Dave Weiner – rhythm guitar; Billy Sheehan – bass; Tony MacAlpine – keyboards, additional guitar; Jeremy Colson – drums
Steve Vai	"Giant Balls of Gold"	Steve Vai – lead guitar, vocals; Dave Weiner – rhythm guitar; Billy Sheehan – bass; Tony MacAlpine – keyboards, additional guitar; Jeremy Colson – drums
Steve Vai	"Answers"	Steve Vai – lead guitar, vocals; Dave Weiner – rhythm guitar; Billy Sheehan – bass; Tony MacAlpine – keyboards, additional guitar; Jeremy Colson – drums
Steve Vai	"The Reaper"	Steve Vai – lead guitar, vocals; Dave Weiner – rhythm guitar; Billy Sheehan – bass; Tony MacAlpine – keyboards, additional guitar; Jeremy Colson – drums
Steve Vai	"Juice"	Steve Vai – lead guitar, vocals; Dave Weiner – rhythm guitar; Billy Sheehan – bass; Tony MacAlpine – keyboards, additional guitar; Jeremy Colson – drums
Steve Vai	"Whispering a Prayer"	Steve Vai – lead guitar, vocals; Dave Weiner – rhythm guitar; Billy Sheehan – bass; Tony MacAlpine – keyboards, additional guitar; Jeremy Colson – drums
Steve Vai	"Fire Garden Suite"	Steve Vai – lead guitar, vocals; Dave Weiner – rhythm guitar; Billy Sheehan – bass; Tony MacAlpine – keyboards, additional guitar; Jeremy Colson – drums
Steve Vai	"Bangkok"	Steve Vai – lead guitar, vocals; Dave Weiner – rhythm guitar; Billy Sheehan – bass; Tony MacAlpine – keyboards, additional guitar; Jeremy Colson – drums
Steve Vai	"Bull Whip"	Steve Vai – lead guitar, vocals; Dave Weiner – rhythm guitar; Billy Sheehan – bass; Tony MacAlpine – keyboards, additional guitar; Jeremy Colson – drums
Steve Vai	"I’m the Hell Outta Here"	Steve Vai – lead guitar, vocals; Dave Weiner – rhythm guitar; Billy Sheehan – bass; Tony MacAlpine – keyboards, additional guitar; Jeremy Colson – drums
Steve Vai	"For the Love of God"	Steve Vai – lead guitar, vocals; Dave Weiner – rhythm guitar; Billy Sheehan – bass; Tony MacAlpine – keyboards, additional guitar; Jeremy Colson – drums
Joe Satriani	"Hands in the Air"	Joe Satriani – lead guitar, vocals; Galen Henson – rhythm guitar; Matt Bissonette – bass; Jeff Campitelli – drums
Joe Satriani	"Satch Boogie"	Joe Satriani – lead guitar, vocals; Galen Henson – rhythm guitar; Matt Bissonette – bass; Jeff Campitelli – drums
Joe Satriani	"Cool #9"	Joe Satriani – lead guitar, vocals; Galen Henson – rhythm guitar; Matt Bissonette – bass; Jeff Campitelli – drums
Joe Satriani	"Gnaahh"	Joe Satriani – lead guitar, vocals; Galen Henson – rhythm guitar; Matt Bissonette – bass; Jeff Campitelli – drums
Joe Satriani	"I Like the Rain"	Joe Satriani – lead guitar, vocals; Galen Henson – rhythm guitar; Matt Bissonette – bass; Jeff Campitelli – drums
Joe Satriani	"Up in Flames"	Joe Satriani – lead guitar, vocals; Galen Henson – rhythm guitar; Matt Bissonette – bass; Jeff Campitelli – drums
Joe Satriani	"Always with Me, Always with You"	Joe Satriani – lead guitar, vocals; Galen Henson – rhythm guitar; Matt Bissonette – bass; Jeff Campitelli – drums
Joe Satriani	"Searching"	Joe Satriani – lead guitar, vocals; Galen Henson – rhythm guitar; Matt Bissonette – bass; Jeff Campitelli – drums
Joe Satriani	"Is There Love in Space?"	Joe Satriani – lead guitar, vocals; Galen Henson – rhythm guitar; Matt Bissonette – bass; Jeff Campitelli – drums
Joe Satriani	"War"	Joe Satriani – lead guitar, vocals; Galen Henson – rhythm guitar; Matt Bissonette – bass; Jeff Campitelli – drums
Joe Satriani	"Flying in a Blue Dream"	Joe Satriani – lead guitar, vocals; Galen Henson – rhythm guitar; Matt Bissonette – bass; Jeff Campitelli – drums
Joe Satriani	"Ice 9"	Joe Satriani – lead guitar, vocals; Galen Henson – rhythm guitar; Matt Bissonette – bass; Jeff Campitelli – drums
G3 Jam	"Red"	Matt Bissonette – bass; Joe Satriani – guitar; Steve Vai – guitar; Robert Fripp – guitar; Billy Sheehan – bass; Jeff Campitelli – drums
G3 Jam	"The Murderer"	Billy Sheehan – vocals, bass; Joe Satriani – guitar; Steve Vai – guitar; Henrique Lourenço – guitar: Matt Bissonette – bass; Jeff Campitelli – drums
G3 Jam	"Rockin' in the Free World"	Joe Satriani – guitar, lead vocals; Steve Vai – guitar, backing vocals; Robert Fripp – guitar; Billy Sheehan – bass; Jeff Campitelli – drums
G3 Jam	"Going Down"	Joe Satriani – guitar, lead vocals; Steve Vai – guitar, backing vocals; Robert Fripp – guitar; "Alejandro Silva" – guitar: Matt Bissonette – bass; Jeff Campitelli – drums

== 2005 ==
The 2005 G3 tour featured John Petrucci, Steve Vai and Joe Satriani touring Japan and the United States. It was recorded on May 8 at the Tokyo Forum, Japan.

G3 2005 setlist
Performer	Song	Musicians
John Petrucci	"Jaws of Life"	John Petrucci – guitar; Dave LaRue – bass; Mike Portnoy – drums
John Petrucci	"Glasgow Kiss"	John Petrucci – guitar; Dave LaRue – bass; Mike Portnoy – drums
John Petrucci	"Lost Without You"	John Petrucci – guitar; Dave LaRue – bass; Mike Portnoy – drums
John Petrucci	"Curve"	John Petrucci – guitar; Dave LaRue – bass; Mike Portnoy – drums
John Petrucci	"Wishful Thinking"	John Petrucci – guitar; Dave LaRue – bass; Mike Portnoy – drums
John Petrucci	"Damage Control"	John Petrucci – guitar; Dave LaRue – bass; Mike Portnoy – drums
Steve Vai	"I'm Becoming"	Steve Vai – lead guitar; Dave Weiner – rhythm guitar; Billy Sheehan – bass; Tony MacAlpine – keyboards, additional guitar; Jeremy Colson – drums
Steve Vai	"The Audience Is Listening"	Steve Vai – lead guitar; Dave Weiner – rhythm guitar; Billy Sheehan – bass; Tony MacAlpine – keyboards, additional guitar; Jeremy Colson – drums
Steve Vai	"Building the Church"	Steve Vai – lead guitar; Dave Weiner – rhythm guitar; Billy Sheehan – bass; Tony MacAlpine – keyboards, additional guitar; Jeremy Colson – drums
Steve Vai	"K'm-Pee-Du-Wee"	Steve Vai – lead guitar; Dave Weiner – rhythm guitar; Billy Sheehan – bass; Tony MacAlpine – keyboards, additional guitar; Jeremy Colson – drums
Steve Vai	"The Crying Machine"	Steve Vai – lead guitar; Dave Weiner – rhythm guitar; Billy Sheehan – bass; Tony MacAlpine – keyboards, additional guitar; Jeremy Colson – drums
Steve Vai	"Lotus Feet"	Steve Vai – lead guitar; Dave Weiner – rhythm guitar; Billy Sheehan – bass; Tony MacAlpine – keyboards, additional guitar; Jeremy Colson – drums
Steve Vai	"I'm the Hell Outta Here"	Steve Vai – lead guitar; Dave Weiner – rhythm guitar; Billy Sheehan – bass; Tony MacAlpine – keyboards, additional guitar; Jeremy Colson – drums
Joe Satriani	"Up in Flames"	Joe Satriani – lead guitar; Galen Henson – rhythm guitar; Matt Bissonette – bass; Jeff Campitelli – drums
Joe Satriani	"Summer Song"	Joe Satriani – lead guitar; Galen Henson – rhythm guitar; Matt Bissonette – bass; Jeff Campitelli – drums
Joe Satriani	"Hordes of Locusts"	Joe Satriani – lead guitar; Galen Henson – rhythm guitar; Matt Bissonette – bass; Jeff Campitelli – drums
Joe Satriani	"Always with Me, Always with You"	Joe Satriani – lead guitar; Galen Henson – rhythm guitar; Matt Bissonette – bass; Jeff Campitelli – drums
Joe Satriani	"War"	Joe Satriani – lead guitar; Galen Henson – rhythm guitar; Matt Bissonette – bass; Jeff Campitelli – drums
Joe Satriani	"Searching"	Joe Satriani – lead guitar; Galen Henson – rhythm guitar; Matt Bissonette – bass; Jeff Campitelli – drums
Joe Satriani	"Just Look Up"	Joe Satriani – lead guitar; Galen Henson – rhythm guitar; Matt Bissonette – bass; Jeff Campitelli – drums
Joe Satriani	"Flying in a Blue Dream"	Joe Satriani – lead guitar; Galen Henson – rhythm guitar; Matt Bissonette – bass; Jeff Campitelli – drums
G3 Jam	"Foxy Lady"	Joe Satriani – guitar, vocals; Steve Vai – guitar; John Petrucci – guitar; Matt Bissonette – bass; Mike Portnoy – drums
G3 Jam	"La Grange"	Billy Sheehan – vocals, bass; Joe Satriani – guitar; Steve Vai – guitar; John Petrucci – guitar; Matt Bissonette – bass; Jeff Campitelli – drums
G3 Jam	"Smoke on the Water"	Matt Bissonette – lead vocals, bass; Joe Satriani – guitar; Steve Vai – guitar; John Petrucci – guitar; Billy Sheehan – bass; Jeff Campitelli – drums

== 2006 ==
The first 2006 G3 tour featured John Petrucci, Eric Johnson and Joe Satriani. Performances were held from October 16, 2006 to October 29, 2006 across Latin America.

The second 2006 G3 tour featured John Petrucci, Steve Vai and Joe Satriani. Performances were held across Australia from November 29, 2006 to December 8, 2006.

G3 2006 setlist
Region	Performer	Song	Musicians
Latin America	Eric Johnson	"Summer Jam"	Eric Johnson – guitar, vocals; Roscoe Beck – bass; Tommy Taylor – drums
Latin America	Eric Johnson	"My Back Pages"	Eric Johnson – guitar, vocals; Roscoe Beck – bass; Tommy Taylor – drums
Latin America	Eric Johnson	"Trademark"	Eric Johnson – guitar, vocals; Roscoe Beck – bass; Tommy Taylor – drums
Latin America	Eric Johnson	"Brilliant Room"	Eric Johnson – guitar, vocals; Roscoe Beck – bass; Tommy Taylor – drums
Latin America	Eric Johnson	"Manhattan"	Eric Johnson – guitar, vocals; Roscoe Beck – bass; Tommy Taylor – drums
Latin America	Eric Johnson	"Morning Sun"	Eric Johnson – guitar, vocals; Roscoe Beck – bass; Tommy Taylor – drums
Latin America	Eric Johnson	"Columbia"	Eric Johnson – guitar, vocals; Roscoe Beck – bass; Tommy Taylor – drums
Latin America	Eric Johnson	"Desert Rose"	Eric Johnson – guitar, vocals; Roscoe Beck – bass; Tommy Taylor – drums
Latin America	Eric Johnson	"Cliffs of Dover"	Eric Johnson – guitar, vocals; Roscoe Beck – bass; Tommy Taylor – drums
Latin America	John Petrucci	"Jaws of Life"	John Petrucci – guitar; Dave LaRue – bass; Mike Portnoy – drums
Latin America	John Petrucci	"Glasgow Kiss"	John Petrucci – guitar; Dave LaRue – bass; Mike Portnoy – drums
Latin America	John Petrucci	"Lost without You"	John Petrucci – guitar; Dave LaRue – bass; Mike Portnoy – drums
Latin America	John Petrucci	"Curve"	John Petrucci – guitar; Dave LaRue – bass; Mike Portnoy – drums
Latin America	John Petrucci	"Wishful Thinking"	John Petrucci – guitar; Dave LaRue – bass; Mike Portnoy – drums
Latin America	John Petrucci	"Damage Control"	John Petrucci – guitar; Dave LaRue – bass; Mike Portnoy – drums
Latin America	Joe Satriani	"Flying in a Blue Dream"	Joe Satriani – lead guitar; Galen Henson – rhythm guitar; Dave LaRue – bass; Jeff Campitelli – drums
Latin America	Joe Satriani	"The Extremist"	Joe Satriani – lead guitar; Galen Henson – rhythm guitar; Dave LaRue – bass; Jeff Campitelli – drums
Latin America	Joe Satriani	"Redshift Riders"	Joe Satriani – lead guitar; Galen Henson – rhythm guitar; Dave LaRue – bass; Jeff Campitelli – drums
Latin America	Joe Satriani	"Satch Boogie"	Joe Satriani – lead guitar; Galen Henson – rhythm guitar; Dave LaRue – bass; Jeff Campitelli – drums
Latin America	Joe Satriani	"Cool #9"	Joe Satriani – lead guitar; Galen Henson – rhythm guitar; Dave LaRue – bass; Jeff Campitelli – drums
Latin America	Joe Satriani	"Super Colossal"	Joe Satriani – lead guitar; Galen Henson – rhythm guitar; Dave LaRue – bass; Jeff Campitelli – drums
Latin America	Joe Satriani	"Just Like Lightnin'"	Joe Satriani – lead guitar; Galen Henson – rhythm guitar; Dave LaRue – bass; Jeff Campitelli – drums
Latin America	Joe Satriani	"Crowd Chant"	Joe Satriani – lead guitar; Galen Henson – rhythm guitar; Dave LaRue – bass; Jeff Campitelli – drums
Latin America	Joe Satriani	"Summer Song"	Joe Satriani – lead guitar; Galen Henson – rhythm guitar; Dave LaRue – bass; Jeff Campitelli – drums
Latin America	Joe Satriani	"Always with Me, Always with You"	Joe Satriani – lead guitar; Galen Henson – rhythm guitar; Dave LaRue – bass; Jeff Campitelli – drums
Latin America	G3 Jam	"Voodoo Child (Slight Return)"	Joe Satriani – guitar; Eric Johnson – guitar, vocals; John Petrucci – guitar; Dave LaRue – bass; Mike Portnoy – drums
Latin America	G3 Jam	"Red House"	Eric Johnson – guitar, vocals; Joe Satriani – guitar; John Petrucci – guitar; Dave LaRue – bass; Jeff Campitelli – drums
Latin America	G3 Jam	"Rockin' in the Free World"	Joe Satriani – guitar, vocals; Eric Johnson – guitar; John Petrucci – guitar; Roscoe Beck – bass; Tommy Taylor – drums
Australia	John Petrucci	"Jaws of Life"	John Petrucci – guitar; Dave LaRue – bass; Mike Portnoy – drums
Australia	John Petrucci	"Glasgow Kiss"	John Petrucci – guitar; Dave LaRue – bass; Mike Portnoy – drums
Australia	John Petrucci	"Lost without You"	John Petrucci – guitar; Dave LaRue – bass; Mike Portnoy – drums
Australia	John Petrucci	"Curve"	John Petrucci – guitar; Dave LaRue – bass; Mike Portnoy – drums
Australia	John Petrucci	"Wishful Thinking"	John Petrucci – guitar; Dave LaRue – bass; Mike Portnoy – drums
Australia	John Petrucci	"Damage Control"	John Petrucci – guitar; Dave LaRue – bass; Mike Portnoy – drums
Australia	Steve Vai	"Tender Surrender"	Steve Vai – lead guitar; Dave Weiner – rhythm guitar; Billy Sheehan – bass; Tony MacAlpine – keyboards, additional guitar; Jeremy Colson – drums
Australia	Steve Vai	"Giant Balls of Gold"	Steve Vai – lead guitar; Dave Weiner – rhythm guitar; Billy Sheehan – bass; Tony MacAlpine – keyboards, additional guitar; Jeremy Colson – drums
Australia	Steve Vai	"Building the Church"	Steve Vai – lead guitar; Dave Weiner – rhythm guitar; Billy Sheehan – bass; Tony MacAlpine – keyboards, additional guitar; Jeremy Colson – drums
Australia	Steve Vai	"Answers"	Steve Vai – lead guitar; Dave Weiner – rhythm guitar; Billy Sheehan – bass; Tony MacAlpine – keyboards, additional guitar; Jeremy Colson – drums
Australia	Steve Vai	"Whispering a Prayer"	Steve Vai – lead guitar; Dave Weiner – rhythm guitar; Billy Sheehan – bass; Tony MacAlpine – keyboards, additional guitar; Jeremy Colson – drums
Australia	Steve Vai	"Freak Show Excess"	Steve Vai – lead guitar; Dave Weiner – rhythm guitar; Billy Sheehan – bass; Tony MacAlpine – keyboards, additional guitar; Jeremy Colson – drums
Australia	Steve Vai	"For the Love of God"	Steve Vai – lead guitar; Dave Weiner – rhythm guitar; Billy Sheehan – bass; Tony MacAlpine – keyboards, additional guitar; Jeremy Colson – drums
Australia	Joe Satriani	"Flying in a Blue Dream"	Joe Satriani – lead guitar; Galen Henson – rhythm guitar; Dave LaRue – bass; Jeff Campitelli – drums
Australia	Joe Satriani	"The Extremist"	Joe Satriani – lead guitar; Galen Henson – rhythm guitar; Dave LaRue – bass; Jeff Campitelli – drums
Australia	Joe Satriani	"Redshift Riders"	Joe Satriani – lead guitar; Galen Henson – rhythm guitar; Dave LaRue – bass; Jeff Campitelli – drums
Australia	Joe Satriani	"Cool #9"	Joe Satriani – lead guitar; Galen Henson – rhythm guitar; Dave LaRue – bass; Jeff Campitelli – drums
Australia	Joe Satriani	"Super Colossal"	Joe Satriani – lead guitar; Galen Henson – rhythm guitar; Dave LaRue – bass; Jeff Campitelli – drums
Australia	Joe Satriani	"Just Like Lightnin'"	Joe Satriani – lead guitar; Galen Henson – rhythm guitar; Dave LaRue – bass; Jeff Campitelli – drums
Australia	Joe Satriani	"Satch Boogie"	Joe Satriani – lead guitar; Galen Henson – rhythm guitar; Dave LaRue – bass; Jeff Campitelli – drums
Australia	Joe Satriani	"Crowd Chant"	Joe Satriani – lead guitar; Galen Henson – rhythm guitar; Dave LaRue – bass; Jeff Campitelli – drums
Australia	Joe Satriani	"Summer Song"	Joe Satriani – lead guitar; Galen Henson – rhythm guitar; Dave LaRue – bass; Jeff Campitelli – drums
Australia	Joe Satriani	"Always with Me, Always with You"	Joe Satriani – lead guitar; Galen Henson – rhythm guitar; Dave LaRue – bass; Jeff Campitelli – drums
Australia	G3 Jam	"Voodoo Child (Slight Return)"	Billy Sheehan – vocals, bass; Joe Satriani – guitar; Steve Vai – guitar; John Petrucci – guitar; Dave LaRue – bass; Mike Portnoy – drums
Australia	G3 Jam	"My Guitar Wants to Kill Your Mama"	Steve Vai – guitar, vocals; Joe Satriani – guitar; John Petrucci – guitar; Billy Sheehan – bass, vocals; Jeff Campitelli – drums
Australia	G3 Jam	"Rockin' in the Free World"	Joe Satriani – guitar, lead vocals; Steve Vai – guitar, backing vocals; John Petrucci – guitar; Dave LaRue – bass; Jimmy Hug – drums

== 2007 ==
The G3 2007 tour featured Paul Gilbert, John Petrucci and Joe Satriani. Shows were held from March 14 to April 14. At the last show of the tour during the song "Glasgow Kiss" Paul Gilbert's band came out wearing kilts and did a small dance.

The G3 Jam featured Johnny A. at the Orpheum Theatre in Boston, MA.

G3 2007 setlist
Performer	Song	Musicians
Paul Gilbert	"Get Out of My Yard"	Paul Gilbert – lead guitar, lead vocals; Bruce Bouillet – rhythm guitar; Mike Szuter – bass, backing vocals; Emi Gilbert – keyboard; Jeff Bowders – drums
Paul Gilbert	"Hurry Up"	Paul Gilbert – lead guitar, lead vocals; Bruce Bouillet – rhythm guitar; Mike Szuter – bass, backing vocals; Emi Gilbert – keyboard; Jeff Bowders – drums
Paul Gilbert	"Rusty Old Boat"	Paul Gilbert – lead guitar, lead vocals; Bruce Bouillet – rhythm guitar; Mike Szuter – bass, backing vocals; Emi Gilbert – keyboard; Jeff Bowders – drums
Paul Gilbert	"Radiator"	Paul Gilbert – lead guitar, lead vocals; Bruce Bouillet – rhythm guitar; Mike Szuter – bass, backing vocals; Emi Gilbert – keyboard; Jeff Bowders – drums
Paul Gilbert	"Scarified"	Paul Gilbert – lead guitar, lead vocals; Bruce Bouillet – rhythm guitar; Mike Szuter – bass, backing vocals; Emi Gilbert – keyboard; Jeff Bowders – drums
Paul Gilbert	"Scit Scat Wah"	Paul Gilbert – lead guitar, lead vocals; Bruce Bouillet – rhythm guitar; Mike Szuter – bass, backing vocals; Emi Gilbert – keyboard; Jeff Bowders – drums
Paul Gilbert	"I Like Rock"	Paul Gilbert – lead guitar, lead vocals; Bruce Bouillet – rhythm guitar; Mike Szuter – bass, backing vocals; Emi Gilbert – keyboard; Jeff Bowders – drums
Paul Gilbert	"Space Ship One"	Paul Gilbert – lead guitar, lead vocals; Bruce Bouillet – rhythm guitar; Mike Szuter – bass, backing vocals; Emi Gilbert – keyboard; Jeff Bowders – drums
Paul Gilbert	"Down to Mexico"	Paul Gilbert – lead guitar, lead vocals; Bruce Bouillet – rhythm guitar; Mike Szuter – bass, backing vocals; Emi Gilbert – keyboard; Jeff Bowders – drums
John Petrucci	"Jaws of Life"	John Petrucci – guitar; Dave LaRue – bass; Mike Portnoy – drums
John Petrucci	"Glasgow Kiss"	John Petrucci – guitar; Dave LaRue – bass; Mike Portnoy – drums
John Petrucci	"Lost without You"	John Petrucci – guitar; Dave LaRue – bass; Mike Portnoy – drums
John Petrucci	"Curve"	John Petrucci – guitar; Dave LaRue – bass; Mike Portnoy – drums
John Petrucci	"Wishful Thinking"	John Petrucci – guitar; Dave LaRue – bass; Mike Portnoy – drums
John Petrucci	"Damage Control"	John Petrucci – guitar; Dave LaRue – bass; Mike Portnoy – drums
Joe Satriani	"War"	Joe Satriani – lead guitar; Galen Henson – rhythm guitar; Dave LaRue – bass; Jeff Campitelli – drums
Joe Satriani	"One Big Rush"	Joe Satriani – lead guitar; Galen Henson – rhythm guitar; Dave LaRue – bass; Jeff Campitelli – drums
Joe Satriani	"Flying in a Blue Dream"	Joe Satriani – lead guitar; Galen Henson – rhythm guitar; Dave LaRue – bass; Jeff Campitelli – drums
Joe Satriani	"Cool #9"	Joe Satriani – lead guitar; Galen Henson – rhythm guitar; Dave LaRue – bass; Jeff Campitelli – drums
Joe Satriani	"Super Colossal"	Joe Satriani – lead guitar; Galen Henson – rhythm guitar; Dave LaRue – bass; Jeff Campitelli – drums
Joe Satriani	"Satch Boogie"	Joe Satriani – lead guitar; Galen Henson – rhythm guitar; Dave LaRue – bass; Jeff Campitelli – drums
Joe Satriani	"Circles"	Joe Satriani – lead guitar; Galen Henson – rhythm guitar; Dave LaRue – bass; Jeff Campitelli – drums
Joe Satriani	"The Mystical Potato Head Groove Thing"	Joe Satriani – lead guitar; Galen Henson – rhythm guitar; Dave LaRue – bass; Jeff Campitelli – drums
Joe Satriani	"Surfing with the Alien"	Joe Satriani – lead guitar; Galen Henson – rhythm guitar; Dave LaRue – bass; Jeff Campitelli – drums
Joe Satriani	"Always with Me, Always with You"	Joe Satriani – lead guitar; Galen Henson – rhythm guitar; Dave LaRue – bass; Jeff Campitelli – drums
G3 Jam	Foxy Lady; Purple Haze Third Stone from the Sun; Voodoo Child (Slight Return)	Mike Szuter – vocals, bass; Joe Satriani – guitar; Paul Gilbert – guitar; John Petrucci – guitar; Galen Henson – rhythm guitar; Dave LaRue – bass; Mike Portnoy – drums
G3 Jam	"Going Down"	Joe Satriani – guitar, lead vocals; Paul Gilbert – guitar, backing vocals; John Petrucci – guitar; Dave LaRue – bass; Jeff Campitelli – drums
G3 Jam	"Jumpin' Jack Flash"	Paul Gilbert – guitar, lead vocals; Joe Satriani – guitar; John Petrucci – guitar; Mike Szuter – bass; Jeff Bowders – drums

== 2012 ==
The G3 2012 tour featured Steve Lukather in Australia/Steve Morse in Europe, Joe Satriani and Steve Vai.

== 2016 ==
The G3 2016 tour featured Joe Satriani and Steve Vai and the Aristocrats. Shows were held in various cities in Italy and Germany from July 2, 2016 to July 13, 2016.

== 2018 ==
The G3 2018 tour featured John Petrucci, Uli Jon Roth in Europe/Phil Collen in the States and Joe Satriani.

== 2024 ==
The G3 2024 thirteen-show US tour featured Steve Vai, Joe Satriani and Eric Johnson. The tour resulted in the Reunion Live album.

== G3 statistics ==
Dream Theater, Scorpions, and Racer X are the only bands that have had two of their members on G3 tour: John Petrucci on guitar and Mike Portnoy on drums (2001, 2002, 2005, 2006 & 2007), John Petrucci on guitar and Mike Mangini on drums (2012,2018), Michael Schenker and Uli Jon Roth both on guitars (1998), and Paul Gilbert and Bruce Bouillet both on guitar (2007).

Alcatrazz has also had two members represented on the G3 tour: Yngwie Malmsteen and Steve Vai. The David Lee Roth Band has had four members touring with G3: Steve Vai, Billy Sheehan, Matt Bissonette and Greg Bissonette.

Robert Fripp, Eric Johnson, Steve Morse, John Petrucci and Uli Jon Roth are the only guitarists (excluding Joe Satriani and Steve Vai) who have played on the G3 tour more than once:

- Steve Vai – 13 times
- John Petrucci – eight times
- Eric Johnson – four times
- Robert Fripp – twice
- Steve Morse – twice
- Uli Jon Roth - twice

=== Headline guitarists ===
- 1996 (North America): Joe Satriani, Steve Vai, Eric Johnson with Kenny Wayne Shepherd and Adrian Legg on select dates
- 1997 (North America): Joe Satriani, Steve Vai, Kenny Wayne Shepherd, Robert Fripp
- 1997 (Europe): Joe Satriani, Steve Vai, Adrian Legg
- 1998 (Europe): Joe Satriani, Michael Schenker, Uli Jon Roth, Keith More (Guest on Glasgow, Birmingham and Croydon), Brian May (On Wembley Arena)
- 2000 (Rentak Rhythm Of Asia) : Joe Satriani, Steve Vai, Eric Johnson
- 2001 (North America): Joe Satriani, Steve Vai, John Petrucci, Steve Morse (guest on 22.7., Orlando, Florida),
- 2003 (North America): Joe Satriani, Steve Vai, Yngwie Malmsteen
- 2004 (Europe/South America): Joe Satriani, Steve Vai, Robert Fripp.
- 2005 (Japan): Joe Satriani, Steve Vai, John Petrucci, Marty Friedman (Although he did not appear in the credits)
- 2006 (South America): Joe Satriani, John Petrucci, Eric Johnson
- 2006 (Australia): Joe Satriani, Steve Vai, John Petrucci
- 2007 (North America): Joe Satriani, John Petrucci, Paul Gilbert
- 2012 (Australia/New Zealand): Joe Satriani, Steve Vai, Steve Lukather
- 2012 (Europe): Joe Satriani, Steve Vai, Steve Morse, Al Di Meola (Guest on July 31 in Prague)
- 2012 (South America): Joe Satriani, John Petrucci, Steve Morse, Steve Lukather (Lukather replaced Morse on October 23, 2012)
- 2016 (Europe): Joe Satriani, Steve Vai, Guthrie Govan (with the Aristocrats).
- 2018 (USA) Joe Satriani, John Petrucci, Phil Collen
- 2018 (Europe) Joe Satriani, John Petrucci, Uli Jon Roth
- 2024 (USA) Joe Satriani, Steve Vai, Eric Johnson

== Discography ==
- G3: Live in Concert (1997)
- G3: Live in Denver (2004)
- G3: Rockin' in the Free World (2004)
- G3: Live in Tokyo (2005)
- G3 Reunion Live (2025)
