= G3: Live in Concert =

1997 album by Joe Satriani, Eric Johnson and Steve Vai

Live album by Joe Satriani, Steve Vai and Eric Johnson
- Released: June 3, 1997
- Recorded: October 30–31; November 1–2, 1996
- Venues: Veterans Memorial Auditorium, The Palace of Auburn Hills, Aragon Ballroom, Northrop Auditorium
- Genre: Rock
- Length: 76:53
- Label: Sony
- Producer: Mike Fraser

Joe Satriani chronology
Joe Satriani (1995)	G3: Live in Concert (1997)	Crystal Planet (1998)

Steve Vai chronology
Fire Garden (1996)	G3: Live in Concert (1997)	The Ultra Zone (1999)

Eric Johnson chronology
Venus Isle (1996)	G3: Live in Concert (1997)	Seven Worlds (1998)

G3 chronology
G3: Live in Concert (1997)	G3: Rockin' in the Free World (2003)

G3: Live in Concert

Video by Joe Satriani, Steve Vai & Eric Johnson
- Released: 2005
- Recorded: October 30–31; November 1–2, 1996
- Venues: Veterans Memorial Auditorium (Columbus), The Palace of Auburn Hills, Aragon Ballroom, Northrop Auditorium
- Genre: Rock
- Length: 1:07:22
- Label: Sony
- Producer: Mike Fraser

G3 chronology
G3: Live in Concert (2005)	G3: Live in Denver (2004)

Professional ratings
Review scores
Source	Rating
Allmusic	3/5 stars

G3: Live in Concert is a live album and DVD by the G3 project, led by Joe Satriani. It was released in 1997 by Epic Records. This lineup of G3 includes Joe Satriani, Eric Johnson and Steve Vai. In 2005, a DVD of this concert was also released.

== Track listing ==
=== CD track listing ===
==== Joe Satriani ====
All songs written by Joe Satriani.

1. "Cool №9" – 6:47
2. "Flying in a Blue Dream" – 5:59
3. "Summer Song" – 6:28

==== Eric Johnson ====
All songs written by Eric Johnson, except where noted.

4. "Zap" – 6:07
5. "Manhattan" – 5:16
6. "Camel's Night Out" (Kyle Brock, Mark Younger-Smith) – 5:57

==== Steve Vai ====
All songs written by Steve Vai.

7. "Answers" – 6:58
8. "For the Love of God" – 7:47
9. "The Attitude Song" – 5:14

==== Joe Satriani, Eric Johnson, Steve Vai ====
10. "Going Down" (Don Nix) – 5:47
  - Jeff Beck cover (Originally released by blues legend Freddie King in 1970)
11. "My Guitar Wants to Kill Your Mama" (Frank Zappa) – 5:21
  - Frank Zappa cover
12. "Red House" (Jimi Hendrix) – 9:12
  - The Jimi Hendrix Experience cover

=== DVD track listing ===
==== Joe Satriani ====
1. "Cool #9"
2. "Flying in a Blue Dream"
3. "Summer Song"

==== Eric Johnson ====
4. "12 to 12 Vibe"
5. "Manhattan"
6. "S.R.V."

==== Steve Vai ====
7. "Answers"
8. "Segueway Jam Piece"
9. "For the Love of God"
10. "The Attitude Song"

==== The G3 Jam ====
11. "Going Down"
12. "My Guitar Wants to Kill Your Mama"
13. "Red House"

== Personnel ==
=== Joe Satriani ===
- Joe Satriani – guitar, vocals
- Stuart Hamm – bass
- Jeff Campitelli – drums

=== Steve Vai ===
- Steve Vai – lead guitar
- Mike Keneally – rhythm guitar, sitar, keyboards, vocals
- Philip Bynoe – bass and percussion
- Mike Mangini – drums and percussion

=== Eric Johnson ===
- Eric Johnson – guitar, vocals
- Stephen Barber – keyboards
- Roscoe Beck – bass
- Brannen Temple – drums

=== G3 ===
- Joe Satriani – guitar, vocals (on Going Down)
- Steve Vai – guitar, vocals (on My Guitar Wants to Kill Your Mama)
- Eric Johnson – guitar, vocals (on Red House)
- Stuart Hamm – bass
- Jeff Campitelli – drums
- Guest: Mike Keneally – vocals (on My Guitar Wants to Kill Your Mama)

== Charts ==
=== Weekly charts ===
Chart performance for G3: Live in Concert
Chart (1997)	Peak position
Australian Albums (ARIA)	78
Dutch Albums (Album Top 100)	52
European Albums (IFPI)	57
Finnish Albums (Suomen virallinen lista)	35
French Albums (SNEP)	20
German Albums (Offizielle Top 100)	92
Icelandic Albums (Tónlist)	25
Portuguese Albums (AFP)	20
Spanish Albums (AFYVE)	44
UK Albums (Official Charts)	82
US Billboard 200	108
US Top Music Videos (Billboard)	5
US Top Video Sales (Billboard)	28
