= Chris Duarte =

Chris Duarte may refer to:

- Chris Duarte (basketball) (born 1997), Dominican basketball player
- Chris Duarte (musician) (born 1963), American guitarist, singer, and songwriter
