= Live in Denver =

Live in Denver may refer to:

- Live in Denver (Panic! at the Disco), a 2006 album and concert movie
- Live in Denver, a 2007 album by King Crimson
- G3: Live in Denver, a 2003 DVD by G3
