= Midge Marsden =

Midge Marsden MNZM
- Birth name: Keith Douglas Marsden
- Born: 17 September 1945 (age 79); New Plymouth, New Zealand
- Genres: Blues; R&B
- Occupation(s): Instrumentalist, singer
- Instrument(s): Guitar, harmonica

Keith Douglas "Midge" Marsden MNZM (born 1945) is a New Zealand blues and R&B guitarist, harmonica-player, and singer with a musical career spanning four decades.

== Life and career ==
Marsden was born and brought up in Moturoa, New Plymouth, Taranaki, the son of Les and Elaine Marsden. His musical education started on the piano and included singing in church, though his first musical love was rock and roll. As a teenager, he took guitar lessons from a New Plymouth musician called Leo Davies, who also owned a recording studio in the town, and went on to further lessons with another musician, Johnny Williams.

Marsden's career spans four decades, and during that time he has played thousands of concerts in New Zealand and introduced several generations of New Zealanders to the blues. He was voted New Zealand Entertainer of the Year in 1990, and his 1991 album Burning Rain later went gold. Marsden did a New Zealand tour with The Rodger Fox band in the latter part of 1993. Several live performances were recorded plus a number of tracks recorded live at Broadcasting House in Wellington. Musicians on that tour included, Neil Hannan on bass, Martin Winch on guitar, Paul Dunningham on drums, Brian Henderson on keyboards, George Chisolm and Geoff Culverwell on trumpets and Brian Smith and Steve Sheriff on saxophones.

Marsden has toured the US four times, and each time he has played with and befriended artists such as Little Willy Foster, Bobby Mack, Ronnie Taylor, and Australian Dave Boyle. He has encouraged all these artists to tour New Zealand, and thus broadened New Zealanders' appreciation of blues music. Marsden was a student at the University of Mississippi in 1996, from where he graduated with a Diploma in Southern Studies, and more recently he has tutored at Waikato Institute of Technology in "Bluesology".

In the 2006 New Year Honours, Marsden was appointed a Member of the New Zealand Order of Merit, for services to music.

Marsden was a friend of Stevie Ray Vaughan; upon living in Texas at various times he would stay at Vaughan's house for months on end. He toured with Vaughan a few times, playing harmonica.

In October 2018 he was presented with the President's Medallion from the Variety Artists Club of New Zealand.

== Discography ==
- 1966: Lets Take A Sea Cruise with Bari and the Breakaways. HMV(NZ)Ltd.
- 1966: Album Two also with The Breakaways. HMV(NZ)Ltd.
- 1979: Phil Manning Band Featuring Midge Marsden (Polydor)
- 1978: " Crossing The Tracks" Country Flyers (SDL Music)
- 1981: "Midge Marsden Connection" (GTM/Mandrill)
- 1982: "12 Bars From Mars" (p)1982 Midge Marsden.
- 1985: "Let The Good Times Roll" The Rodger Fox Band and Midge Marsden (Circular Records)
- 1990: Burning Rain (Sony)
- 1993: "Are Back in Town" Midge Marsden and The Rodger Fox Band (TBone Records)
- 1993: "Travellin' On" (p)1993 Midge Marsden.
- 2002: "It Is What It Is" Midge Marsden & Bullfrog Rata (p)2002 Midge Marsden.
- 2007: "Travel 'N Time" (Liberation/SDL Music)
- 2014: "Back to the Well" (SDL Music)
- 2017: " The Midge Marsden Collection" (SDL Music)
