= Sound Theories Vol. I & II =

Live album by Steve Vai with Metropole Orkest
- Released: June 26, 2007
- Recorded: 2004/2005
- Genre: Instrumental rock, symphonic rock
- Length: 101:08
- Label: Epic / Red Ink
- Producer: Steve Vai

Steve Vai chronology
G3: Live in Tokyo (2005)	Sound Theories Vol. I & II (2007)	Where the Wild Things Are (2009)

Metropole Orkest chronology
The Look of Love (2006)	Sound Theories Vol. I & II (2007)	Who'll Speak for Love (2007)

Professional ratings
Review scores
Source	Rating
Allmusic	link
CD Universe	4/5 stars
Record Collector	4/5 stars

Sound Theories Vol. I & II is a 2007 album by American guitarist Steve Vai. The album was recorded with the Metropole Orchestra in Netherlands in mid-2004/2005 and released on June 26, 2007.

Volume I features Vai playing guitar with the orchestra, which has itself earned worldwide acclaim by backing artists ranging from Mike Keneally, Terry Bozzio, Tony Bennett and Natalie Cole to Nancy Wilson and the Yellowjackets. Volume II features the Orchestra performing compositions written by Vai, including "Shadows and Sparks" and "Bledsoe Bluvd."

== Track listing ==
All songs written by Steve Vai.

=== Disc One - Sound Theories Vol 1: "The Aching Hunger" ===
1. "Kill the Guy with the Ball" - 4:30
2. "The God Eaters" - 2:09
3. "The Murder Prologue" - 1:09
4. "The Murder" - 7:56
5. "Gentle Ways" - 5:48
6. "Answers" - 5:44
7. "I'm Becoming" - 2:20
8. "Salamanders in the Sun" - 5:05
9. "Liberty" - 2:06
10. "The Attitude Song" - 4:37
11. "For the Love of God" - 9:35

=== Disc Two - Sound Theories Vol 2: "Shadows and Sparks" ===
1. "Shadows and…" - 8:41
2. "Sparks" - 9:27
3. "Frangelica Pt. I" - 3:04
4. "Frangelica Pt. II" - 10:30
5. "Helios and Vesta" - 8:19
6. "Bledsoe Bluvd" - 10:08

== DVD ==
A companion DVD titled Visual Sound Theories was released through Epic/Sony on September 18, 2007. This DVD features the live performances from the Aching Hunger concerts with the Holland Metropole Orchestra in July 2005.

The DVD includes 14 tracks in both stereo and 5.1 surround sound:

1. Kill the Guy with the Ball
2. The God Eaters
3. The Murder Prologue
4. The Murder
5. Answers
6. Lotus Feet
7. I'm Becoming
8. Salamanders in the Sun
9. The Attitude Song
10. Gentle Ways
11. Liberty
12. For the Love of God
13. Shadows and Sparks
14. Frangelica Pt. I & II

== Charts ==
Chart (2007)	Peak position
US Billboard Top Independent Albums	45
