= Adrian Legg =

English guitarist

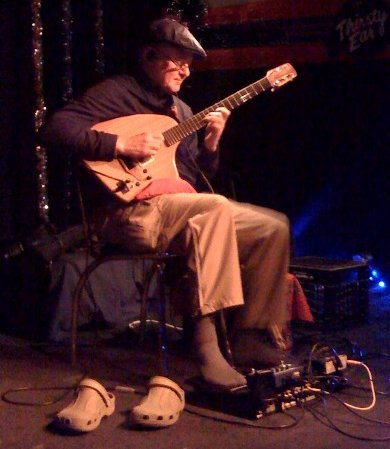
- Adrian Legg at the Thirsty Ear Tavern, 20 December 2008

Background information
- Born: 16 May 1948 (age 78); Hackney, London, England
- Genres: Ambient rock, acoustic rock
- Occupations: Musician, songwriter, Guitar instructor, luthier
- Instrument: Guitar
- Years active: 1978–present
- Labels: Favored Nations Acoustic, Red House, Relativity, MMC, Making Waves, Spindrift
- Website: adrianlegg.com

Adrian Legg (born 16 May 1948) is an English guitar player. He plays custom guitars that are a hybrid of electric and acoustic, and his fingerstyle picking technique has been acknowledged by the readers of Guitar Player who voted Legg the "best acoustic fingerstyle" player four years in a row (1993–1996).

From his early start as a bench technician customising electric guitars, Legg moved into guitar instruction, publishing books and videos on guitar technique. In 1996 and 1997, Legg shared the stage with acclaimed guitar experts Joe Satriani, Eric Johnson and Steve Vai as part of the G3 tour. Vai called Legg "Uncle Adrian" and Satriani said of Legg's musicianship, "He's simply the best acoustic guitar player I've ever heard. I don't know anyone else who can create such a cascade of beautiful notes... Adrian plays like he's got hammers for fingers."

== Career ==
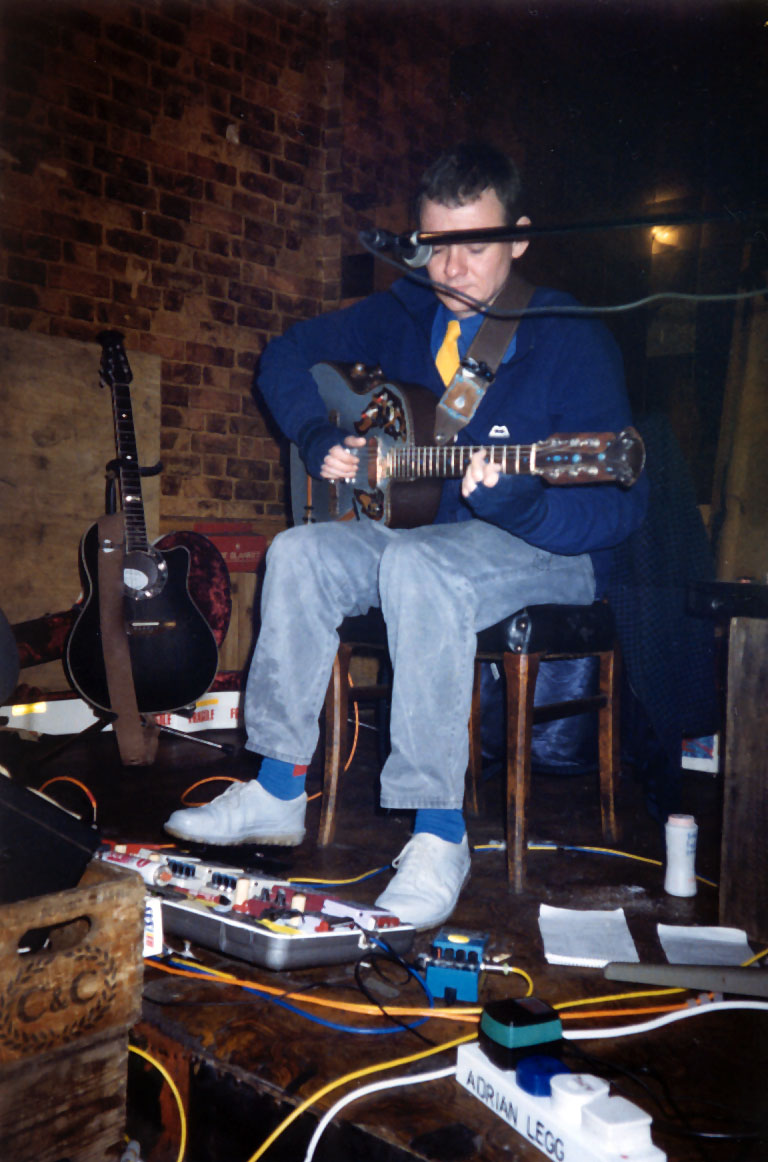
Legg at the Hare and Hounds pub in North London, 27 March 1987

Legg was born in Hackney, London, England. He studied the oboe as a child, but in teenage years his interest shifted to the guitar.

In the early 1970s, Legg won both the composition and performance sections of a competition run by the now defunct Guitar magazine, published by Musical New Services of Denmark Street, which led to his being asked to contribute articles to the magazine. He spent from 1979 to 1981 as a technician at Rose Morris Ltd., who then handled Marshall amplification, Ovation Guitars and Takamine Guitars. Around this time he worked with Vox, designing passive circuits for use in their guitar range.

Legg wrote the 1981 book Customising Your Electric Guitar, published by Kaye and Ward. He produced a stream of articles for the UK music press during the 1980s. Electronics and Music Maker printed a series of 7 articles on guitar wiring, coil tapping and modifications, starting March 1981. Legg wrote various articles for One Two Testing between 1982 - 1984. 1986 - 1987 saw him writing a monthly column in Making Music.

In 1983 Legg, who was at the time an Ovation Guitars demonstrator, signed to Spindrift Records, releasing Technopicker later that year.

He worked with the Trace Elliot company to develop an amplifier designed specifically for the acoustic guitar. In a 1992 interview, he said the company had consulted him during its development.

Legg worked with Relativity Records leading to the 1990 US release of Guitars & Other Cathedrals which Relativity licensed from EMI. Four further albums followed, with Legg helping to cement the Relativity's reputation as a guitar label.

As part of the G3 tours in 1996 and 1997 Legg played alongside Joe Satriani and Steve Vai. An infrequent singer, he helped with vocal duties on the G3 jam performance of Red House by Jimi Hendrix

Over the years Legg has played at the Montreux Jazz Festival, and toured with a range of musicians, including Richard Thompson, David Lindley, Nanci Griffith,, and Tanita Tikaram.

Legg has released several instructional guitar videos and books. He has also been a commentator-at-large for National Public Radio's "All Things Considered."

== Style ==
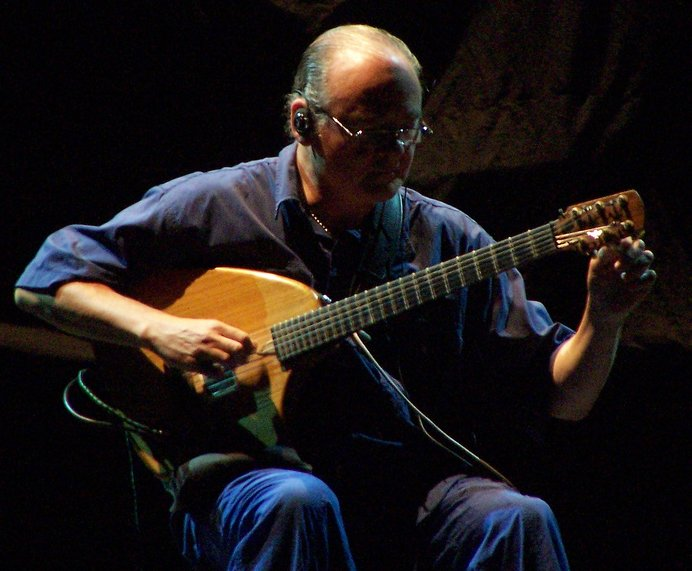
Legg performing at the Auditorio Maestro Padilla in Almería, Spain, 18 July 2006

Legg plays fingerstyle guitar, combining alternating-bass patterns with harmonics, single- and double-string bends, and changes in pitch made using banjo-style tuning pegs. His playing frequently features flowing arpeggios, sometimes carrying the melody through an entire piece, as heard in "Mrs. Jack's Last Stand". He makes extensive use of altered tunings and capos to expand his tonal range. Many of his guitars are fitted with banjo tuning pegs, which enable him to change a string's tuning during a performance and produce glissando effects as part of his playing. Guitar author Richard Chapman wrote that Legg was "impossible to categorize".

Legg’s distinctive style draws on techniques and sounds associated with other stringed instruments, particularly the banjo and pedal steel guitar. He has described looking to other instruments for ideas that can be adapted to the guitar, combining these influences with elements of folk, country, Celtic, blues, jazz and classical music. His custom-built guitars and use of electronic effects further extend his tonal range, allowing him to combine acoustic fingerstyle playing with sounds more commonly associated with electric guitar.

Legg has said that his true home is onstage. "Playing live is the whole point... Everyone makes a journey, an effort; we all come together – me, the audience, the people who run the venue – to share this wonderful, universal, human emotional interaction. This is where music lives."

Legg is known for his humorous storytelling between songs, which he has described as a way to enliven his performances and stimulate dialogue with the audience.

== Equipment ==
Guitars
Early on in Legg's career he was known for his association with Ovation guitars, in particular his modified Adamas which had a very shallow body, making amplification more practical at concert volume. He used lightweight strings, which helped him perform wide pitch bends.

Legg developed problems with his back that caused him pain whilst playing live. He commissioned luthier Bill Puplett to build an ergonomic guitar in 1995. The guitar, which he calls 'Bill', has a solid swamp-ash body with a hollowed out interior, a walnut neck, an ebony fingerboard and a soundhole in the treble side cutaway. It combines acoustic tonal qualities with a compact electric guitar-like design.

Legg teamed up with Mace Bailey at Ibanez to design a guitar with the smallest space incorporating a fully functional Strat layout. Using maple throughout, they worked a body shape inspired by an old Vox Phantom, with bespoke Seymour Duncan pickups. He uses it primarily as a back up, stating it makes a useful lap slide.

In the studio Legg has also used a small, 19th-century-style parlor guitar made by Brook Creedy. This was the main acoustic he used on Guitar Bones, and two tracks on Inheritance.

Other equipment
The Keith banjo tuners are amongst the most distinctive parts of Legg's equipment. They allow for a string's pitch to change quickly between predetermined notes. This allows for fluid pitch changes and almost pedal-steel-like effects in the middle of a melody.

During his interview with Vintage Guitar, Legg spoke about his extensive use of synthesised and modelled guitar sounds on his 2004 album Inheritance, reflecting on his experimentation with MIDI and guitar-modelling technology.

In a 2015 interview with Vintage Guitar Legg discussed some of the signal processors and effects that he utilizes to shape his acoustic tone. This included several effects boxes such as the Effectrode PC-2A compressor, and an Effectrode Helios fuzz. In 2017 Wampler confirmed via a blog on their official website that Legg had been using their Black '65 Overdrive for some time.

In 2016, Legg endorsed Neunaber Audio and was using a Neunaber Audio Immerse Reverberator.

== Discography ==
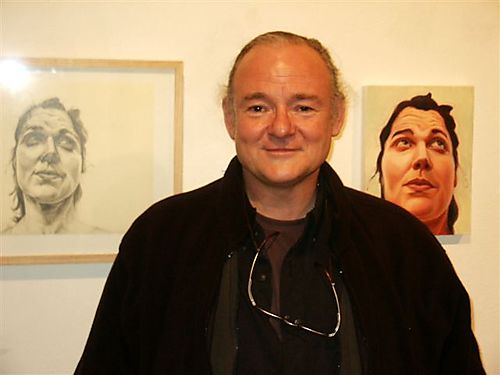
Legg in May 2004 at Legion Arts in Cedar Rapids, Iowa

=== Albums ===
Year	Title	Label	Number	Notes
1976	The All Round Gigster	Guitarist Magazine (UK)	G104	LP with companion book
1977	Requiem for a Hick	Westwood	WRS 125	LP
1983	Technopicker	Spindrift	Spin 201	LP
1985	Fretmelt	Spindrift	Spin 115	LP
1986	Lost For Words	Making Waves	Spin 127	LP
1988	Guitars & Other Cathedrals	MMC	MMC 1014	US release 1990 under Relativity RR 1045
1992	Guitar for Mortals	Relativity	RR 1078	
1993	Wine, Women & Waltz	Relativity	RR 9024	
1993	Mrs. Crowe's Blue Waltz	Relativity	RR 9085	
1994	High Strung Tall Tales	Relativity	RR 1224	
1997	Waiting for a Dancer	Red House	RHR 99	
1999	Fingers and Thumbs	Red House	RHR 133	
2001	A Postcard From London	Favored Nations Acoustic	no number	2 CD-ROM set with photo essays and musical score
2003	Guitar Bones	Favored Nations Acoustic	FNA 5060	
2004	Inheritance	Favored Nations Acoustic	FNA 5100	
2011	Slow Guitar	Self Release	AL1	
2012	The Very Best of Adrian Legg	Varèse Sarabande	VSD-7166	
2014	Dead Bankers	Self Release	AL2	
2017	Live	Self Release	AL3	

=== Videos ===
Year	Title	Label	Number	Notes
1985	Beyond Acoustic Guitar	Hot Licks	151	VHS
1992	Fingerpicking and Open Tunings	Hot Licks	165	VHS, reissued on DVD (2006)
1999	How to Cheat at Guitar	Homespun Tapes	no number	VHS, reissued on DVD (2006) as How to Become a More Creative Guitarist
2018	Adrian Legg Live! The Movie!	Self release	no number	DVD

=== Compilations ===
- Full Moon (1997)
- The Ultimate Guitar Survival Guide (1993)
- Relativity: Here and Now... Musical Masters (1991)
