= Tailspin Headwhack =

Studio album by Chris Duarte
- Released: 1997
- Label: Silvertone

Chris Duarte chronology
Texas Sugar/Strat Magik (1994)	Tailspin Headwhack (1997)	Love Is Greater Than Me (2000)

Tailspin Headwhack is the second studio album by American musician Chris Duarte, credited under the Chris Duarte Group.

== Reception ==
Professional ratings
Review scores
Source	Rating
AllMusic	4/5 stars

The Associated Press praised Duarte's vocals and songwriting, calling the album "one of the most important blues offerings of the year." Writing for AllMusic, Thom Owens called Tailspin Headwhack a "successful second record", noting the album's "hot Texas blues-rock". While he criticized the lack of original material, he praised each single's "energy and passion." Music critic Michael Point noted how the guitar playing in both Tailspin Headwhack and its predecessor Texas Sugar/Strat Magik were "an enlightened extension of Stevie Ray Vaughan's".

== Charts ==
Chart (1997)	Peak position
US Top Blues Albums (Billboard)	4
US Heatseekers Albums (Billboard)	25

== Track listing ==
No.	Title	Length
1.	"Cleopatra"	5:04
2.	"Crimino"	5:24
3.	"The Thrill Is Gone"	5:07
4.	"Drivin' South"	5:04
5.	"Catche The Next Line"	4:29
6.	"Tailspin Headwhack"	4:37
7.	"People Say"	5:51
8.	"Crazy"	4:31
9.	".32 Blues"	7:25
10.	"Walls"	5:24
