= Texas Sugar/Strat Magik =

Studio album by Chris Duarte
- Released: 1994
- Studio: Bad Animals
- Label: Silvertone
- Producer: Dennis Herring

Chris Duarte chronology
Chris Duarte & The Bad Boys (1987)	Texas Sugar/Strat Magik (1994)	Tailspin Headwhack (1997)

Texas Sugar/Strat Magik is an album by the American musician Chris Duarte, credited to the Chris Duarte Group. It was released in 1994. Duarte promoted the album by playing shows with the Radiators, Bad Company, and Neil Zaza, among others; the Chris Duarte Group also toured Australia, Europe, and Japan.

== Production ==
The album was produced by Dennis Herring. Brannen Temple and John Jordan played, respectively, drums and bass on the album. The album title, which was chosen by Silvertone, refers to Duarte's preference in guitars, and is also a reference to Blood Sugar Sex Magik. "Shiloh" is a tribute to Jimmie and Stevie Ray Vaughan. "Just Kissed My Baby" is a cover of the Meters song. "Letter to My Girlfriend" is a cover of the Guitar Slim song.

== Critical reception ==
Professional ratings
Review scores
Source	Rating
AllMusic	4/5 stars
Calgary Herald	A
Chicago Tribune	2/4 stars
The Encyclopedia of Popular Music	4/5 stars
The Indianapolis Star	3/4 stars
MusicHound Rock: The Essential Album Guide	1.5/5 stars

The Calgary Herald wrote that Duarte "drags the late Stevie Ray Vaughan's chops through the dirt and cooks them over smokin' bonfires that light the firmament with blues power." The Ottawa Citizen noted that, "with Duarte's tight, punchy band, his gritty Hendrixian vocals and a flashy but light-fingered style, blues-rock fans can't go wrong with Texas Sugar/Strat Majik." The Dallas Morning News concluded that the album illustrates "the limited triumphs and triumphant limitations of bar-band music."

The Chicago Tribune opined that, "for all his technique and showmanship, Duarte still sounds too much like a Vaughan disciple." The St. Petersburg Times likewise determined that "certain moments on Duarte's latest album make you wish that some of the late giant's patented riffs had been declared part of his estate when he died." The Times thought that the album has "a raw immediacy which is rarely captured on contemporary blues recordings."

AllMusic wrote that Duarte "fails to come up with any memorable songs, although he does contribute several competent, unexceptional genre pieces—but as an instrumentalist, he's first-rate, spitting out solos with a blistering intensity or laying back with gentle, lyrical phrases." MusicHound Rock: The Essential Album Guide praised "Shiloh", but concluded that "other than that, Texas Sugar lacks a few dozen degrees of vitality."

== Track listing ==
No.	Title	Length
1.	"My Way Down"
2.	"Letter to My Girlfriend"
3.	"C-Butt Rock"
4.	"Just Kissed My Baby"
5.	"Shiloh"
6.	"Scrawl"
7.	"What Can I Do?"
8.	"Big-Legged Woman"
9.	"Borrowed Love"
