= Brannen Temple =

American drummer

- Born: August 26, 1970 (age 55); Austin, Texas, United States
- Genres: Jazz, R&B, Funk, Country, Soul, Rock, Fusion
- Occupation: Musician
- Instruments: Drums, percussion
- Years active: 1990–present
- Website: brannentemple.net

Brannen Temple (born August 26, 1970) is an American three time Grammy Award winning drummer, who is best known as a drummer for acts such as Eric Burdon, Robben Ford, Lizz Wright, Eric Johnson, and currently Ruthie Foster.

Born in Austin, Texas, he started playing drums at the age of 10, soon to play in school jazz bands.

Since the early 1990s, Temple is an accomplished session drummer and played on records by Chris Duarte, Patrice Rushen, Chris Smither, Abra Moore, Stephen Bruton, Jody Watley, Alejandro Escovedo, amongst others. In 1996, he was part of the first G3 Tour, drumming for Eric Johnson and was featured on their 1997 live album G3: Live in Concert.

Since the new millennium he has also played on records by Toni Price, Bob Schneider, Lavelle White, Darden Smith, Robben Ford, Bobby Whitlock, Katie Armiger and appeared on Robert Rodriguez's motion picture soundtrack for Grindhouse: Planet Terror (2007).

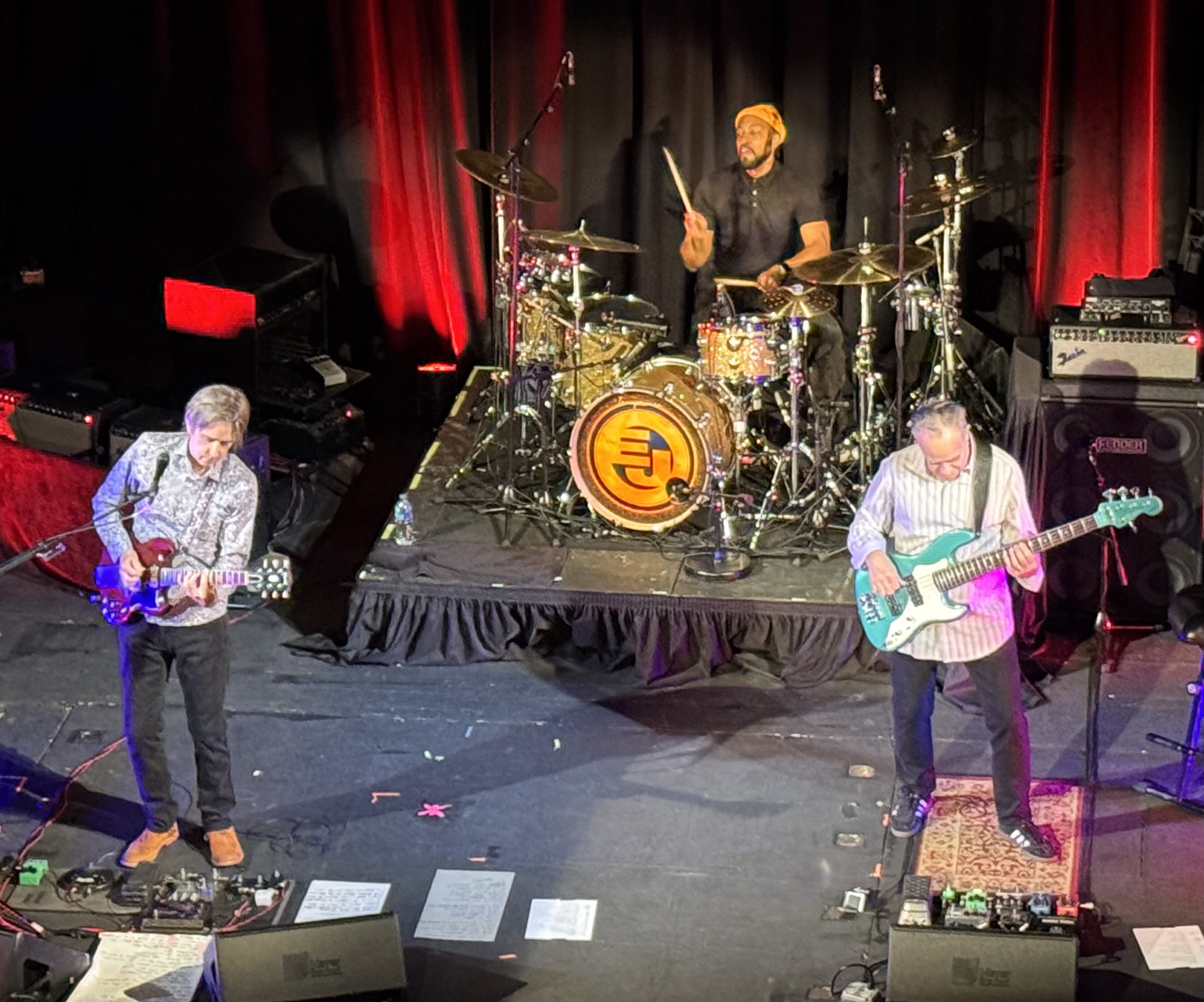
Temple (center) performing with Eric Johnson (left) in 2025

He was the live drummer of Eric Burdon & The Animals from 2009 until 2013. Since 2010 he also tours on and off with Chris Duarte Group, jazz vocalist Lizz Wright and keyboardist Bobby Sparks. Temple received several Austin Music Awards over the years in the "Best Drummer" or "Best Jazz Band" categories for his bands Hot Buttered Rhythm, Blaze and Black Red Black. In 2020 as part of the studio band for Gary Clark Jr. he received a Grammy Award for "Best Rock Performance", "Best Contemporary Blues Album" and "Best Rock Song" for the album and song title This Land.

He resides in Austin and has several local jazz/funk bands, amongst them 'Temple Underground' and 'Black Red Black' (featuring Red Young and Ephraim Owens) and now 'The Brannen and Red Show' (drums and organ duo). He has worked with Janet Jackson, Rose McGowan, Fastball, Monte Montgomery, Sheena Easton, Kevin Paige, Jimmie Vaughan, Dixie Chicks, Lee Roy Parnell, Jody Watley, Patrice Rushen and Chaka Khan.

== Discography ==
- 1992 – Mitch Watkins – Strings With Wings
- 1994 – Chris Duarte Group – Texas Sugar
- 1994 – Chris Duarte Group – Austin. Texas
- 1994 – Patrice Rushen – Anything But Ordinary
- 1995 – Chris Smither – Up on the Lowdown
- 1995 – Jody Watley – Affection
- 1995 – Abra Moore – Sing
- 1995 – Stephen Bruton – Right on Time
- 1995 – Mitch Watkins – Humhead
- 1996 – Alejandro Escovedo – With These Hands
- 1996 – Tormenta – Tormenta
- 1996 – Joel Nava – Soy Otro
- 1997 – Abra Moore – Strangest Places
- 1997 – Lavelle White – It Haven't Been Easy
- 1997 – Hot Buttered Rhythm – Hot Buttered Rhythm
- 1997 – G3 – Live in Concert
- 1997 – David Ryan Harris – David Ryan Harris
- 1997 – Chris Smither – Small Relevations
- 1998 – Ramino Herrera – Con El Mismo Amor
- 1998 – Jeff Robinson – Any Shade of Blue
- 1999 – 8 1/2 Souvenirs – Twisted Desire
- 1999 – Stephen Bruton – Nothing But The Truth
- 1999 – Chris Smither – Drive You Home Again
- 2000 - Clay Moore - To A Tee
- 2000 – Tina Lear – The Road Home
- 2000 – Seela Misra – Something Happened
- 2000 – Willie Oteri – Concepts of Mate Matoot
- 2001 – Toni Price – Midnight Pumpkin
- 2001 – Brent Palmer – Boomerang Shoes
- 2001 – Laura Scarborough – The Project Live
- 2002 – Bob Schneider – The Galaxy Kings
- 2002 – Stephen Bruton – Spirit World
- 2002 – Chris Thomas King – A Young Man's Blues
- 2003 – Lavelle White – Into The Mystic
- 2003 – Blaze – Aural Karate
- 2003 – Nicknack – Mustard Seed
- 2004 - Clay Moore - ¡Damelo!
- 2004 – Javier Vercher – Introducing Jarvier Vercher Trio
- 2004 – Fastball – Keep Your Wig On
- 2004 – Darden Smith – Circo
- 2006 – Leni Stern – Love Comes Quietly
- 2006 – Gecko Turner – Chandalismo Illustrado
- 2007 – Bobby Whitlock – Lovers
- 2007 – Greg Koch – Live on the Radio (featuring Joe Bonamassa and Robben Ford)
- 2008 – Michael Cross – Blues Lovin' Man
- 2009 – Radney Foster – Revival
- 2010 – Katie Armiger – The Confessions of a Nice Girl
- 2010 – Carrie Rodriguez – The New Bye & Bye
- 2010 – Betty Buckley – Bootleg: Boardmixes From The Road
- 2011 – Geno Stroia II – From The Hip
- 2011 – Lizz Wright – Tiny Desk Concert
- 2012 – Erik Sanne – De Fantastische Expeditie
- 2013 – Eric Burdon – 'Til Your River Runs Dry
- 2016 – Will Knaak – The Only Open Road
- 2017 – Eric Johnson – Collage

=== DVDs ===
- 2005 – Robben Ford – New Morning: The Paris Concert
