= G3: Live in Denver =

Video by Joe Satriani, Steve Vai & Yngwie J. Malmsteen
- Released: February 24, 2004
- Recorded: October 20, 2003
- Genre: Hard rock, neoclassical metal, instrumental rock
- Length: 1:52:00
- Label: Epic
- Director: A. Karim Karmi
- Producer: Joe Satriani; Steve Vai; Yngwie Malmsteen

G3 chronology
G3: Live in Concert (1997)	G3: Live in Denver (2004)	G3: Live in Tokyo (2005)

G3: Live in Denver is a live DVD of the 2003 G3 tour, featuring performances by G3 founder Joe Satriani, Steve Vai, and Yngwie Malmsteen. Along with this DVD, a double-CD album was released, G3: Rockin' in the Free World. The DVD was recorded at the Fillmore Auditorium in Denver, on October 20, 2003. Despite the name on the DVD case, when played the title that appears on screen is "G3: Live from Denver" rather than "G3: Live in Denver".

== Track listing ==
=== Joe Satriani ===
1. "Satch Boogie"
2. "The Extremist"
3. "Starry Night"
4. "Midnight"
5. "The Mystical Potato Head Groove Thing"

=== Steve Vai ===
6. "I Know You're Here"
7. "Juice"
8. "I'm the Hell Outta Here (feat. Tony Macalpine)"

=== Yngwie Malmsteen ===
9. "Evil Eye"
10. "Baroque 'n' Roll"
11. "Acoustic Guitar Solo"
12. "Adagio"
13. "Far Beyond the Sun"
14. "Amazing speed"

=== The G3 Jam ===
1. "Rockin' in the Free World"
2. "Little Wing"
3. "Voodoo Child (Slight Return)"

== Charts ==
=== Weekly charts ===
Chart performance for G3: Live in Denver
Chart (2004–06)	Peak position
Australian DVD (ARIA Charts)	8
Finnish Music DVD (Suomen virallinen lista)	1
Greek Music DVD (IFPI)	4
New Zealand Music DVD (RMNZ)	3
Norwegian Music DVD (VG-lista)	1
Portuguese Music DVD (AFP)	2
Swedish Music DVD (Sverigetopplistan)	2
UK Music Videos (OCC)	11
US Music Videos (Billboard)	5

== Certifications ==
Certifications for G3: Live in Denver
Region	Certification	Certified units/sales
Argentina (CAPIF)	Platinum	8,000^{^}
New Zealand (RMNZ)	Gold	2,500^{^}
United States (RIAA)	Platinum	100,000^{^}
^{^} Shipments figures based on certification alone.
