= The Attitude Song =

Instrumental by Steve Vai

from the album Flex-Able
- Released: January 1984
- Recorded: April–November 1983
- Genre: Instrumental rock Heavy metal
- Length: 3:23
- Label: Epic Records
- Songwriter: Steve Vai
- Producer: Steve Vai

"The Attitude Song" is the sixth track of Steve Vai's debut solo album Flex-Able, which was released in 1984. The track is an instrumental piece performed on a six string guitar. It is his most performed song and appears on the G3: Live in Concert DVD, on the Live at Astoria DVD (with special guest Eric Sardinas), and in orchestral form with the Metropole Orkest on Sound Theories.

"The Attitude Song" was the first Guitar Player magazine "Soundsheet", published in the October 1984 issue.

On March 4, 2010, as part of the launch of Harmonix's Rock Band Network downloadable content platform, "The Attitude Song" was offered as new content for Rock Band. Also offered were Vai's "Get The Hell Out Of Here" and a live version of "For The Love Of God".
