= Bobby Mack =

- Born: June 19, 1954 (age 71); Fort Worth, Texas, United States
- Genres: Electric blues, blues rock, Texas blues
- Occupation: Musician
- Instruments: Guitar, vocals
- Labels: Provogue
- Website: bobbymack.com

Bobby Mack (born June 19, 1954, Fort Worth, Texas, United States) is an American blues rock guitarist and singer based in Austin, Texas.

== Career ==
During the 1970s, Mack played a mix of blues and rock in a covers band, Thrills, before forming his own Austin-based blues band Night Train, and former Thrills drummer, Steve Fulton. After various replacement personnel, Mack changed the band name to Bobby Mack & The Night Train to establish a firmer identity.

In 1996, Mack played guitar on, and produced, Little Willy Foster's debut album.

== Discography ==
- Sugar All Night (1996)
- Live at J&J Blues Bar (1997)
- Highway Man (1998)
- Honeytrap (2003)
- Say What! (2004)
- Red Hot & Humid (2004)
