= Provogue =

Indian clothing and accessories retailer

- Industry: Retail
- Founded: 1997
- Headquarters: Mumbai, India
- Key people: Nikhil Godika (Director); Vivek Chopra (Director); Pravin Prabhakar (CEO)
- Products: Luggage, Bags
- Number of employees: 25
- Website: www.provogue.com

Provogue is an Indian clothing and accessories retailer based in Mumbai, Maharashtra. It was launched in 1997 as a menswear fashion brand for contemporary clothing. Over the years the brand has expanded its collection of men’s and women’s fashion apparel and accessories.

== Sponsorship ==
Provouge was the apparel sponsor of Indian cricket league. They also became the kit sponsor of Rajasthan Royals in 2015 and the deal was ended in 2017. As of 2010, Hrithik Roshan was the brand ambassador for Provogue. while Mahesh Babu is the brand ambassador for Provogue in South India.

== Products ==
As of 2014, Provogue stores have men's clothing and women's clothing, each of these being subdivided in Lower Garment, Upper Garment, Shoes and Accessories. Most recently, Provogue has introduced a range of unisex deodorants, watches and sunglasses to complement the collections.

== Stores ==
There are over 50 Provogue stores located across 40 cities in India.

On 1 July 2013, Provogue announced the launch of its e-commerce business portal.

On 18 September 2019, a bench of the National Company Law Tribunal (NCLT) in Mumbai ordered the liquidation of readymade garment maker Provogue (India) Ltd after lenders did not agree on the offers on the table for the company.

Provogue is being acquired by Rajkot-based investment firm Plutus Investments and Holding Private Limited for under Rs.100 crore, according to an order delivered by the national company law tribunal (NCLT) as a going concern after NCLT ordered its liquidation way back in October 2019.
