= Flying in a Blue Dream (song) =

Song by Joe Satriani

from the album Flying in a Blue Dream
- Released: October 30, 1989
- Recorded: Fantasy Studios, Berkeley, CA; Hyde Street Studios; Different Fur; Coast Recorders; Alpha & Omega Recording, San Francisco, CA
- Genre: Instrumental rock
- Length: 5:28
- Label: Relativity Records
- Songwriter: Joe Satriani
- Producers: Joe Satriani, John Cuniberti

"Flying in a Blue Dream" is a song by American guitarist Joe Satriani, from his 1989 studio album of the same title. It starts with a recording of a radio station teamed with emotional feedback then follows into the proper song. It is one of Satriani's most popular songs, and is still performed at all of his live concerts. Live versions can be found on the Live in San Francisco, Satriani Live!, and G3: Live in Concert albums.

The intro heard was not planned, but was recorded nonetheless by producer John Cuniberti while recording Satriani's guitar parts for the song. Apparently, Satriani's amplifier was picking up a frequency from a radio or TV station, and Cuniberti simply said, "I'm recording this," and proceeded. Amidst the recorded speech is a young boy's voice saying "sometimes afterwards they still like each other, and sometimes they don't." The same excerpt is still used today when Satriani performs the song in concert. The acoustic rhythm guitar part is usually played as a backing track.

Musically, the track strongly features the C Lydian mode, giving it a spacey-dreamy feeling.

Also featured strongly in the track is Joe Satriani's fluid and complex usage of the legato technique to quickly play scalar runs.

When played live, the intro feedback is produced by Satriani and then manipulated by physically moving himself and his guitar to different positions relative to his amplifier - this changes the frequencies of the feedback, giving an interesting array of variations on the initial feedback. Satriani knows where the harmonics are generated on each separate stage on tour by "mapping them out" during soundchecks and marking the physical points on-stage with tape.

== Awards and nominations ==
- 2014 - VH1's "20 Greatest Hard Rock & Metal Instrumentals of all time" - 4th Place
