= Chris Duarte (musician) =

American guitarist, singer, and songwriter (born 1963)

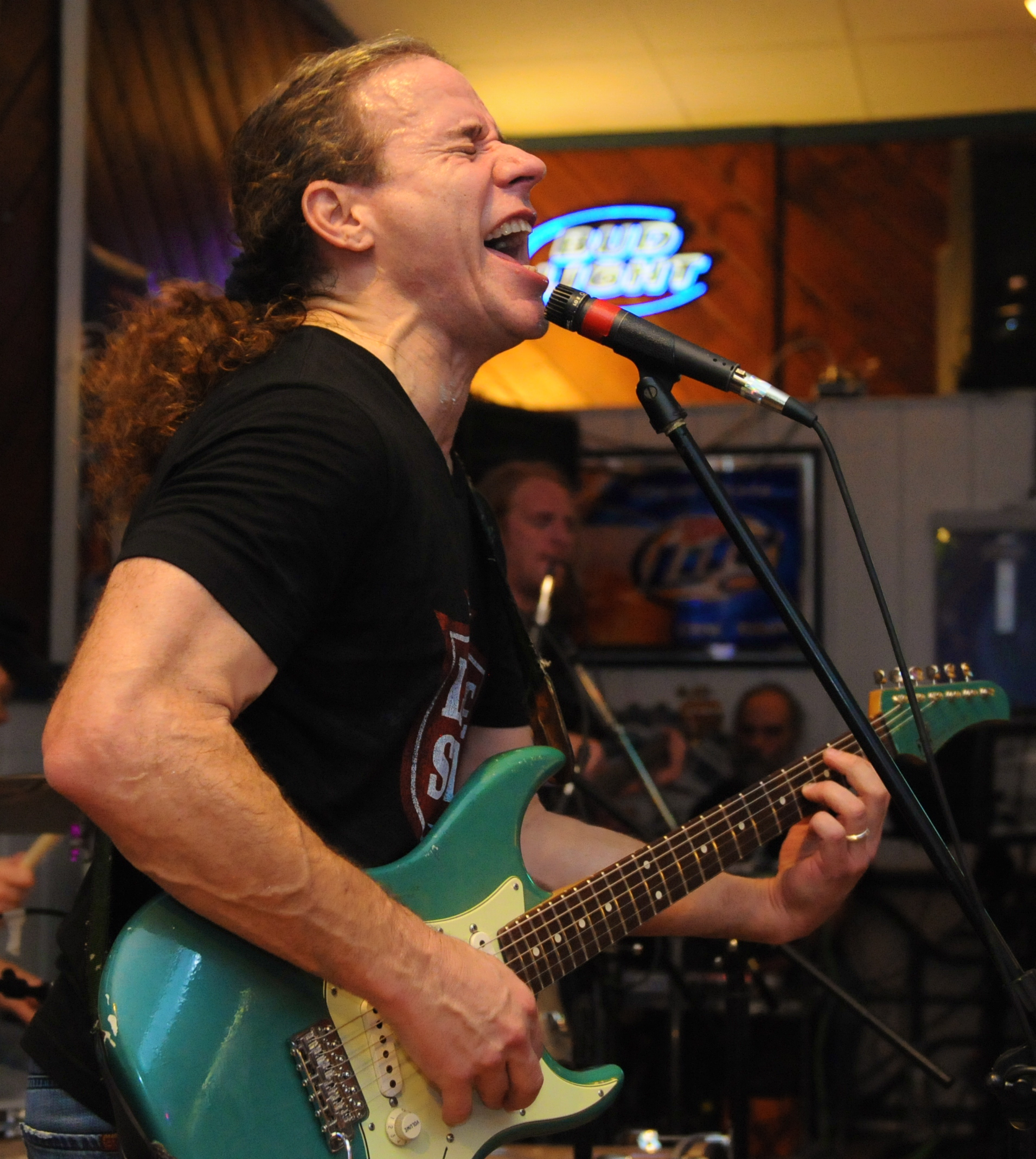
- Chris Duarte performing November 9, 2012 at the Alamo Cafe in Brockton, Massachusetts

Background information
- Born: February 16, 1963 (age 63); San Antonio, Texas, U.S.
- Genres: Blues rock, southern rock, electric blues, Texas blues
- Occupations: Musician, singer, songwriter
- Instruments: Guitar, vocals
- Labels: Aeroliner; Blues Bureau International; Janblues; Provogue; Rounder; Shrapnel; Silvertone; SRS; World Domination; Zoë
- Website: https://duarte.rocks/

Chris Duarte (born February 16, 1963) is an American guitarist, singer, and songwriter. Duarte plays a style of Texas blues-rock that draws on elements of jazz, blues, and rock and roll. In his own words, his musical style is a combination of "rockin' blues" and "punk blues." He is signed to Shrapnel Records.

== Biography ==
Duarte was born in San Antonio, Texas, and was first inspired by music at age eight after seeing Fiddler On The Roof on television. Duarte first began playing on his brother's guitar and then obtained his own electric guitar, a Supro, at the age of 14. In 1979, Duarte moved to Austin, Texas, and purchased a 1963 Fender Stratocaster guitar for $500 and began exploring various genres including the jazz music of John Coltrane and Miles Davis. This guitar he primarily used to learn to play, was stolen in 1993. Duarte was inspired by blues legend Stevie Ray Vaughan, and credits John Coltrane as his number-one musical idol.

Duarte won a label recording contract with Silvertone Records and released Texas Sugar/Strat Magik in 1994, and was named "Best New Talent" in Guitar Player's 1995 Reader's Poll. He finished fourth in the magazine's "Best Blues Guitarist" category behind Eric Clapton, Buddy Guy and B.B. King.

Duarte said once in an interview, "I always thought I was a better live performer anyway." Though Duarte has played a limited number of US dates in recent years with the Japanese band Bluestone Company backing him, he performs primarily as a power trio billed as the Chris Duarte Group. Originally formed with long-time friends and collaborators, John Jordan on bass and Jeff Hodges on drums, the current incarnation features Dustin Sargent on bass and John McKnight on drums.

Apart from his band, Duarte has performed with Julie Burrell, Diana Cantu, Bobby Mack, Tracy Conover, Indigenous, and Omar & the Howlers. He has also performed with Ted Nugent.

Duarte's concert dates in Asheville, North Carolina; Charlotte, North Carolina; and Greenville, South Carolina; were filmed for the PBS television show, The PBS Project, and featured Steve Bailey on bass and Jeff Sipe on drums.

His thirteenth album, Lucky 13, is billed as a Chris Duarte Group release, featuring Dustin Sargent on the bass, and John McKnight on the drums, while Duarte plays the guitar and provides vocals. Following its release in 2014, it received positive reviews for its blend of slow, loping blues with psychedelic, rock and jazz overtones.

== Select discography ==
=== Albums ===
- 1987: Chris Duarte and the Bad Boys (SRS Records)
- 1994: Texas Sugar/Strat Magik (Silvertone/Jive/BMG)
- 1997: Tailspin Headwhack (Silvertone/Jive/BMG)
- 2000: Love Is Greater Than Me (Zoë/Rounder/UMe)
- 2003: Romp (Zoë/Rounder/UMe)
- 2007: Blue Velocity (Blues Bureau International/Shrapnel)
- 2008: Vantage Point (Blues Bureau International/Shrapnel)
- 2009: Chris Duarte & Bluestone Co. – 396 (Blues Bureau International/Shrapnel)
- 2009: Something Old, Something New, Something Borrowed, All Things Blue (Blues Bureau International/Shrapnel) compilation
- 2010: Infinite Energy (Blues Bureau International/Shrapnel)
- 2011: Blues In the Afterburner (Blues Bureau International/Shrapnel)
- 2013: My Soul Alone (Blues Bureau International/Shrapnel)
- 2013: Live (Blues Bureau International/Shrapnel)
- 2014: Lucky 13 (Blues Bureau International/Shrapnel)
- 2016: The Chris Duarte Group (The Fan Club) (World Domination Productions)
- 2023: Ain't Giving Up (Provogue)

=== Other appearances ===
- 1985: Bobby Mack & Night Train – Night Train (SJM Records)

=== Instructional DVDs ===
- 1995: The Total Guitar CD, Volume 6 – Total Guitar
- 2006: Axplorations – Hal Leonard Corporation
