= For the Love of God (instrumental) =

Instrumental by Steve Vai

from the album Passion and Warfare
- Released: July 1990
- Recorded: 1989–1990
- Genre: Instrumental rock; hard rock
- Length: 6:02
- Label: Relativity; Epic
- Songwriter: Steve Vai
- Producer: Steve Vai

"For the Love of God" is an instrumental guitar piece by Steve Vai. It is the seventh song on Vai's 1990 album, Passion and Warfare. The piece runs for six minutes and features a number of techniques including pitch bends, legato, and sweep picking. Vai recorded the track on the fourth day of a ten-day fast. During an interview, he explained, "I do try to push myself into relatively altered states of consciousness. Because in those states you can come up with things that are unique even for yourself".

David Coverdale of Whitesnake provides a spoken word at the end of the song. He speaks the phrase, "Walking the fine line between Pagan and Christian." Vai recorded the song on an early prototype of the Ibanez Universe 7-string guitar, which he eventually gave to Prince in 1996.

Steve Vai debuted the song in Seville, Spain, during the "Leyendas de la Guitarra" (Guitar Legends) festival in 1991. One of its most acclaimed performances was with the Metropole Orchestra in the Netherlands, which is featured on the Sound Theories album.

"For the Love of God" was voted number 29 in a readers' poll of the 100 greatest guitar solos of all time for the magazine, Guitar World. "For the Love of God" has also been featured on numerous video games such as, Guitar Hero III: Legends of Rock and Rock Band.
