= Still Dancing (song) =

2025 song by Billy Idol

Single by Billy Idol

from the album Dream Into It
- Released: 26 February 2025
- Genre: New wave; punk rock; glam rock
- Length: 3:47
- Label: BFI
- Songwriters: Billy Idol; Steve Stevens; Tommy English; Joe Janiak

Billy Idol singles chronology
| "Cage" (2022) | "Still Dancing" (2025) | "77" (2025) |

Audio sample
- file; help

Music video
- "Still Dancing" on YouTube

"Still Dancing" is a song by the English rock singer Billy Idol, released in 2025 as the first single from his ninth studio album, Dream Into It. The first new release from Idol since his EPs, The Roadside (2021) and The Cage (2022), it came along with the announcement of his first album in 11 years.

== Composition and lyrics ==
A tribute to his first hit, "Dancing with Myself", as referenced in the lines “I’m still dancing but now I’m not alone” and “from LA to Tokyo," the autobiographical song has been described as "new-wave-meets-punk" by Stereoboard, and a "brooding glam rock meditation on resilience" by Music Talkers. "'Still Dancing' is really a reflection of my whole journey." shares Idol. "From the punk rock period through to now. And I’m still looking towards the future, still living the life I set out to live."

== Reception ==
KGLK writer Ethan states that normally artists he's loved since the 80's "put out new songs that are just ok, but Billy has been dropping great tracks non-stop, like this new one." The Arts Desk writer Joe Muggs credits "Still Dancing", along with the opening title track and “Gimme the Weight”, as standout tracks on Dream Into It, adding it's "closest to his classic early ‘80s new wave style."

== Music video ==
The music video, directed by Steven Sebring, sees Idol perform the song in a club and on the street after looking through his old records in a record store.

== Personnel ==
Credits adapted from Tidal.

- Billy Idol – lead vocals, backing vocals
- Tommy English – backing vocals, guitar, keyboards, synthesizer
- Chris Chaney – bass
- Steve Stevens – guitar
- Josh Freese – drums
- Jeremy Hatcher – backing vocals
