= Dream Into It =

Studio album by Billy Idol
- Released: 25 April 2025
- Genres: Punk rock; new wave; pop-punk; dance-rock; pop rock; glam rock
- Length: 34:50
- Labels: Dark Horse; BMG
- Producer: Tommy English

Billy Idol chronology
The Cage (2022)	Dream Into It (2025)

Singles from Dream Into It
- 1. "Still Dancing" Released: 26 February 2025; 2. "77" Released: 22 April 2025; 3. "John Wayne" Released: 2 June 2026

Dream Into It is the ninth studio album by the English rock singer Billy Idol. It was released on 25 April 2025 by Dark Horse Records and BMG, and is his first album in over a decade, the last being 2014's Kings & Queens of the Underground, and his first new songs since 2022, when he released the EP The Cage. The concept album about Idol's life is his shortest to date, with a duration of only 34 minutes and 50 seconds. It is primarily a rock album, with elements of pop, electronic, country and grunge. Idol reunited with collaborator Steve Stevens for the album, which also has guest appearances by Avril Lavigne, Alison Mosshart and Joan Jett.

The then unnamed album was announced on 21 January 2025, along with a supporting tour, It's a Nice Day to... Tour Again! The name Dream Into It was revealed on 26 February alongside its first single, "Still Dancing". A second single, "77", was released three days before the album on 22 April and reached No. 37 on the US Adult Pop Airplay charts. Vinyl and CD releases of the album have an alternate version without Avril Lavigne. The album itself was commercially successful in Europe, its highest position being No. 2 on the German Albums Chart.

Dream Into It received generally favorable reviews from music critics. The Arts Desk praised the album for being charming and unique, and Rolling Stone Germany. The supporting It's a Nice Day to... Tour Again! tour with Joan Jett and the Blackhearts, started on 30 April 2025 in Phoenix, Arizona and will end on 25 September 2025 in Los Angeles, with a European leg between June and July. Idol and Avril Lavigne performed the duet "77" on the April 28th episode of ABC's Jimmy Kimmel Live!.

== Background and recording ==
Billy Idol's first new songs since his previous album, Kings & Queens of the Underground (2014), were on a pair of EPs, The Roadside in 2021 and the following year's The Cage. Realizing he did the same amount of press for the EPs as his albums, he exclaimed "f-ck this, come on, let's make an album!" while on a Zoom call with Billboard at his Los Angeles home.

Idol collaborates, once again, with longtime guitarist and songwriting partner Steve Stevens, along with bassist Chris Chaney (Jane's Addiction), drummer Josh Freese (most recently of the Foo Fighters) and producer Tommy English (returning from The Cage) on Dream Into It. He deviated from his normal songwriting sequences in order to tell his story the way he wanted: "the album is a little bit about the story of my life, almost in chronological order. That's how we've even done the track listing. We didn't do it like that in the old days. You always did it [with] a hit single first and the second single second. But this [album] is telling a story, that's the story of my life."

=== Rock and Roll Hall of Fame nomination ===
The idea that I did it for the love, and then it led to this long career and even possibly being inducted into the Rock and Hall of Fame, it just shows you that if you do it for the right reasons, maybe some of the best things in the world can happen to you.

— Billy Idol reflecting on his music career and nomination.

Billy Idol has been eligible for the Rock and Roll Hall of Fame since 2006, but became a first time nominee on 12 February 2025, alongside Bad Company, the Black Crowes, Mariah Carey, Chubby Checker, Joe Cocker, Joy Division/New Order, Cyndi Lauper, Maná, Oasis, OutKast, Phish, Soundgarden and The White Stripes. The previous year, Ozzy Osbourne, a fellow English rock musician, was inducted with the help of Idol, who performed his song "No More Tears" in Cleveland, Ohio with his guitarist Steve Stevens, as well as Andrew Watt and Zakk Wylde.

He was pleasantly surprised by his nomination, and claimed he was "really knocked out. It's really fantastic, and what a great honor just to be included with those other fellow artists on that list." Idol has never felt snubbed over not being nominated sooner: "Well, there's so many great people who have yet to be in the Rock & Roll Hall of Fame — someone like [fellow nominee] Joe Cocker, for instance," he noted. "So of course you don't tend to think about yourself." He also mentioned that, if inaugurated, he would like to give a shout out to his former Generation X bandmates, particularly Tony James, whom he talked about starting out in the music industry with, during his potential speech.

While still processing the news on 13 February, he told Ultimate Classic Rock that, "If I do get to be in the Rock & Roll Hall of Fame, you really get a chance to thank your fans. That's what I like about it. You know, you get a chance to really thank everybody who supported you through thick and thin. So that's an incredible honor. I mean, I'm knocked out. I've only just started to take it in."

Austin, Texas based music journalist and musician Bryan Rolli felt that Idol's nomination was well-earned. "From his voice to his showmanship to his catalog of hits, Billy is the consummate rock star in every sense of the word," he noted during a discussion of the year's nominees. Rolli also praised his blend of punk, rock and pop that influenced pop-punk bands such as Green Day and Blink-182. Despite this, Idol was not inducted.

== Composition and lyrics ==
Dream Into It is a concept album, the second by Idol after the infamous Cyberpunk (1993). The album's autobiographical nature came about as he was working on a documentary, "Billy Idol Should Be Dead" with filmmaker Jonas Åkerlund, released on 10 June 2025. Idol's previous album, Kings & Queens of the Underground, was also a reflection on his life story, but was more surface level. He insists "with this album, I wanted to really talk about all of my life. Lyrically, I couldn’t help but bounce off the documentary, sequencing the album so it told the story of my life."

Consisting of nine tracks, divided into two halves ("Dying to Live" and "I'm Reborn"), the album has been described as punk rock, new wave, pop-punk, pop rock and glam rock, with elements of soft rock and grunge. While overall retaining the dance-rock style of Idol's previous albums, Dream Into It also consists of both anthemic pop-punk songs, and more atmospheric, midtempo cuts. Tommy English's production is guitar heavy, also incorporating subtle synth and drum machine textures to evoke a 1980s pop atmosphere.

=== Dying to Live ===
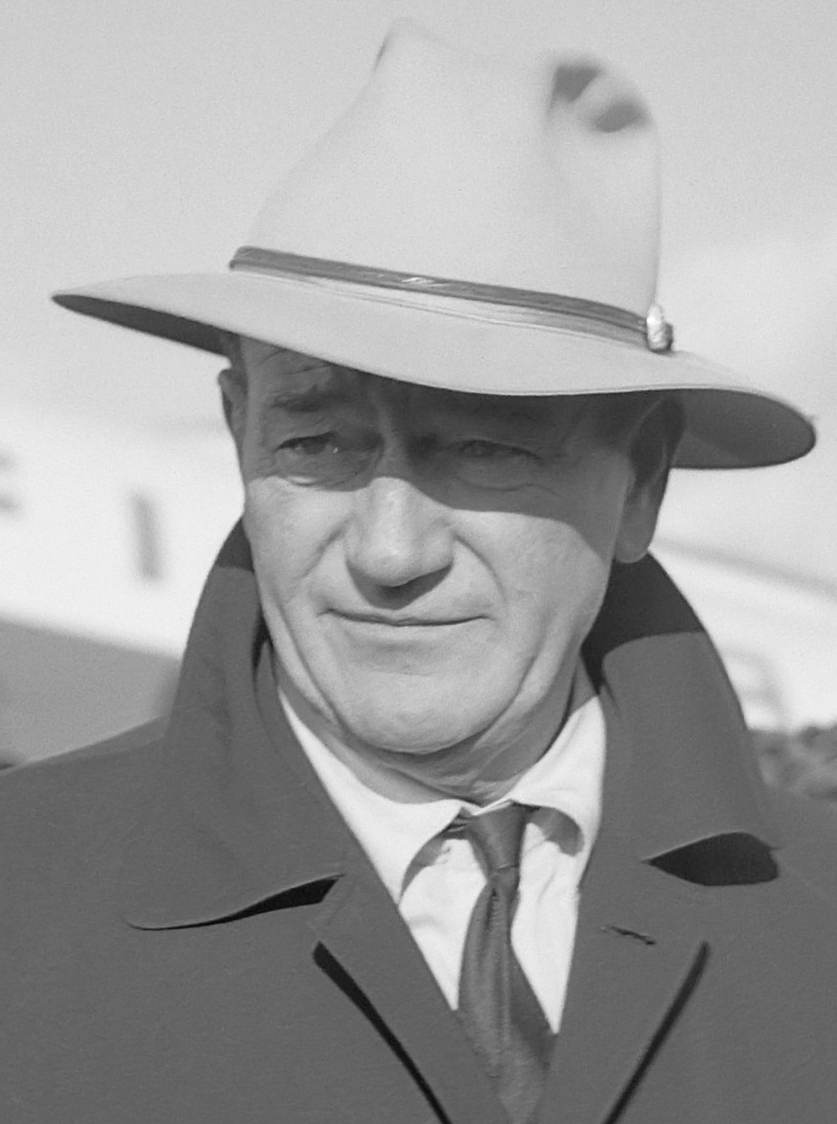
Actor John Wayne, referenced in the song of the same name

The album's first half, "Dying to Live", sees Idol reflecting on his past, such as his early passion for music, his humble beginnings in the London punk scene, as well as his alcohol and drug addictions. The opening title track starts as a "calm, electronic dreamscape with introspective lyrics" but evolves into a pop-punk ballad, as Idol recalls his childhood dreams.

"77" is a fast pop-punk song and duet with Avril Lavigne, which merges the punk energy of his 1970s roots with the mall-punk of Lavigne's early 2000s style. 1977 is a significant year to Idol because he was part of the Bromley Contingent, a group of fans that followed the Sex Pistols around from show to show.

"Too Much Fun" and "Wildside", a duet featuring Joan Jett, bring light to Idol's substance abuse and self-destructive behaviors. The former is a heavier, punk rock song where Idol recollects on his drug addiction, even referencing his motorcycle accident from 1990, while the latter is a mid-tempo rocker, where the two look back on their early days and recognize they can still get rowdy at older ages.

"John Wayne", first released as one of two new songs on the greatest hits album The Very Best of Billy Idol: Idolize Yourself (2008), was re-recorded for Dream Into It as a country-tinged duet with Alison Mosshart. The song is inspired by the actor of the same name, with Idol stating "I enjoy singing [new track] 'John Wayne' because I always think about some of the characters he played that had to rise above their own limitations, so it's fun to take a little bit of that magic for yourself."

=== I'm Reborn ===
At the start of the song I'm recalling the early times in London, when I was living in squats or at friends' apartments, all my belongings in a plastic bag," Idol said in a statement. "Punk rock gave me an opening. I was surrounded by people who loved the music as deeply as I did.

— Billy Idol on the meaning of "Still Dancing"

The album's second half, "I'm Reborn", named after a lyric in "I'm Your Hero", is more forward-looking, with Idol trying to improve as a family man, finding love as a distraction from his rock star lifestyle, and appreciating what he has in life. It starts with "People I Love", written from the point of view of a younger Idol, who details his shortcomings as a husband and father. The song has been labeled an "unapologetic punk-rock venture," more comparable to Sum 41 or Blink-182.

"Gimme The Weight" on the other hand, is a love song more in-line with the new wave Idol is known for. The "pounding beat and the hedonistic vibe of the music" undercuts the song's serious messages of Idol, tired of his drink and drug-addled rock star life, seeks comfort in the arms of a woman.

The introspective power ballad "I'm Your Hero" is also about Idol as a family man. More specifically, it is about the long-term relationship he has been in with his girlfriend, English actor China Chow, since February 2018. Opening with a "dramatic choir-like a capella segment," the song progress into bluesy rock.

The final track, "Still Dancing", is the closest to Idol's new wave style from the 80s, with a sound reminiscent of "Dancing with Myself", also referenced in the line "I'm still dancing but now I’m not alone” and “from LA to Tokyo" and lyrics, verses and rhythm guitars akin to "White Wedding". The "new-wave-meets-punk" song has Idol reflect on his self-awareness and corrections, keeping him alive and well, while appreciating his current life and what he has.

== Release and promotion ==
Guest appearances on "Dream Into It"

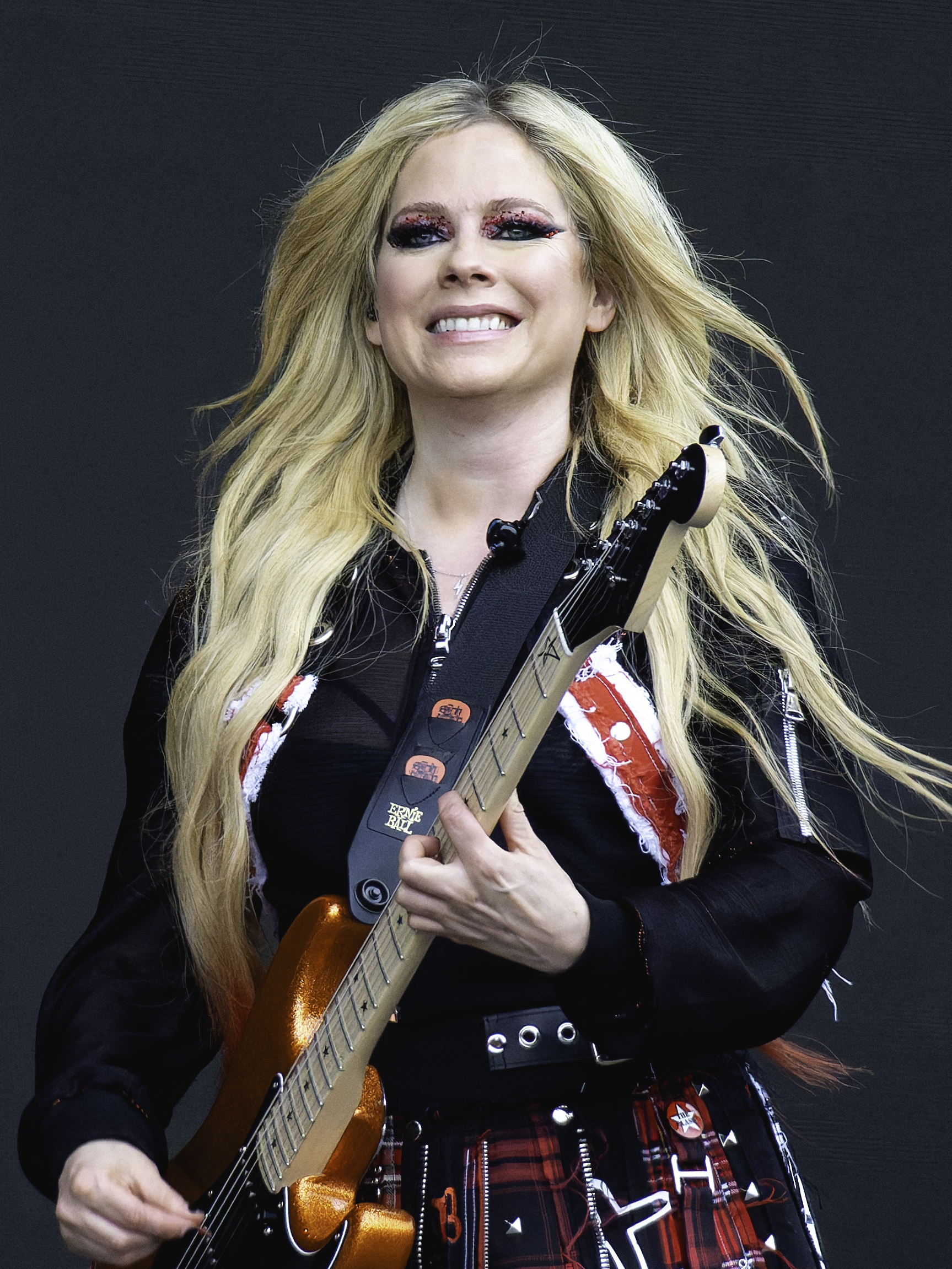
Avril Lavigne

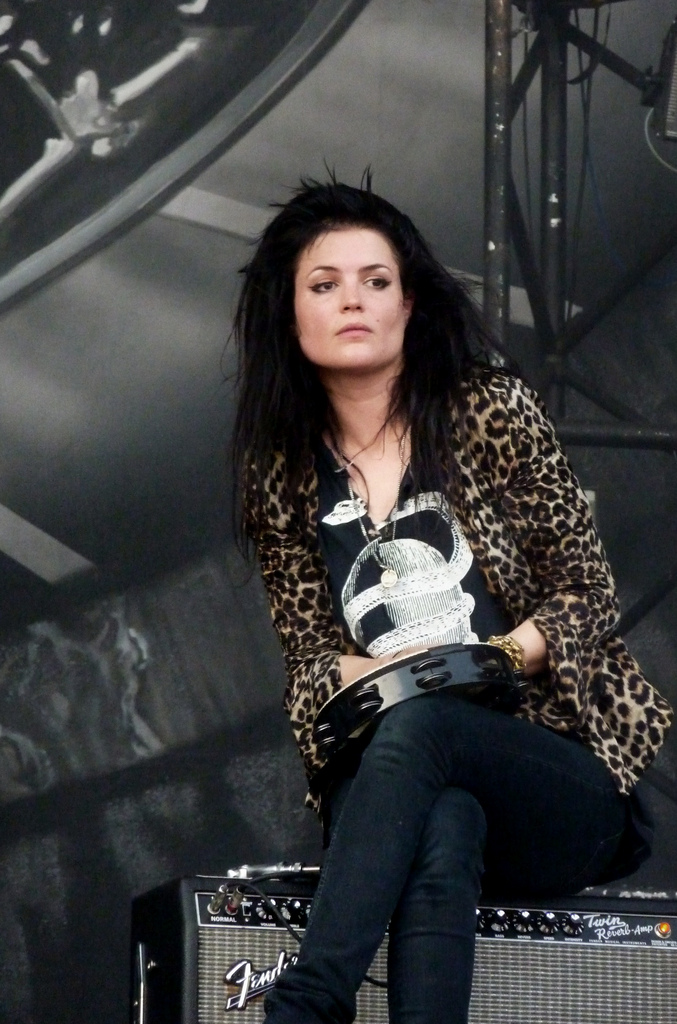
Alison Mosshart

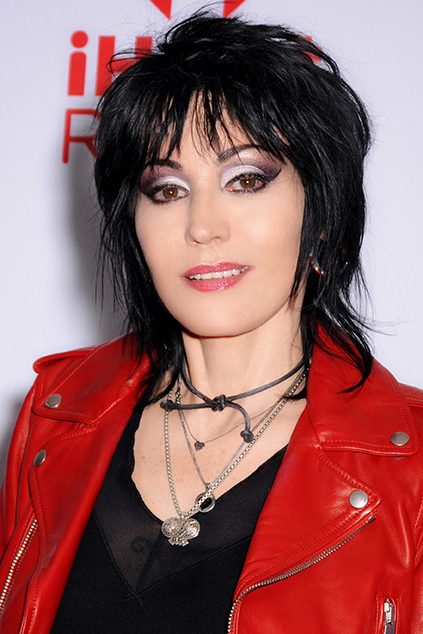
Joan Jett

The then unnamed album, set to release in April, was first announced on 21 January 2025 through a humorous video in which he can't go anywhere without having somebody quote his own lyrics to him. The album's name, Dream Into It, was revealed on Billy Idol's website, along with the release of its first single, "Still Dancing", on 26 February 2025. A music video, directed by Steven Sebring, was released the same day, while Avril Lavigne, Alison Mosshart and Joan Jett were confirmed to make guest appearances on the album. Idol also announced that it would be a concept album reflecting on his life story and disclosed the track listing.

A second single, "77", was released three days before the album on 22 April, along with an animated music video. This was Avril Lavigne's first song of 2025, though she has no writing credit and is absent from the vinyl and CD releases of the album. The song was a minor success, and reached No. 37 on the US Adult Pop Airplay charts. Both singles were released by BFI Records, while Dream Into It itself was released by Dark Horse and BMG on 25 April. A commercial success in Europe, its highest positions were No. 3 on the Swiss Albums chart, and No. 2 on the German Albums chart.

Dream Into it is currently being supported by the It's a Nice Day to... Tour Again! tour, announced the same day as the album on 21 January. The summer tour with Joan Jett and the Blackhearts is produced by Live Nation, and started on 30 April in Phoenix, Arizona and ended on 25 September in Los Angeles, with a European leg between June and July. Fan ticket and VIP package pre-sales for the tour began on 22 January, while general tickets were made available two days later on 24 January. Five dollars from every ticket sold to the Los Angeles show at Kia Forum was donated to the American Red Cross to support Southern California Wildfire Relief.

On June 2, 2026, Billy released a video for "John Wayne", featuring Alison Mosshart. Like the "Still Dancing" video it was directed by Steve Sebring. Billy told that the video "was inspired by our mutual love of westerns and spaghetti westerns while also playing homage the great masters like Leone and Warhol. And having Alison on the track made it 3x better - we did it first at the Hoover Dam and I thought wouldn’t it be great to have this version on the “Dream Into It” record. Much love to Alison for bringing an incredible spirit to this song and video".

== Critical reception ==
Professional ratings
Aggregate scores
Source	Rating
Metacritic	70/100
Review scores
Source	Rating
AllMusic	4/5 stars
The Arts Desk	2/5 stars
Blabbermouth.net	6/10
Classic Rock	3.5/5 stars
laut.de	3/5 stars
Louder Than War	3/5 stars
Mojo	3/5 stars
Record Collector	3/5 stars
Rolling Stone (de)	1.5/5 stars
The Times	3/5 stars

On Metacritic, a review aggregator site that compiles reviews from mainstream publications and assigns a weighted average score out of 100, Dream Into It received a "generally favorable reviews" score of 70, based on six reviews. Idol, when interviewed by USA Today, joked the then upcoming album is "a killer record" with "not a bad track" on 17 March 2025. He also praised Avril Lavigne's performance on "77", calling her "incredible" and adding "it was already good with me on it, but it got three times better with her on it."

AllMusic critic Matt Collar states that Idol "underscores his legacy as one of the original pop-punk prophets, a kid with spiky, peroxide-blonde hair who saw the future of punk and lived to tell the tale," while Ultimate Classic Rock critic Michael Gallucci opined it "often plays out like a diary of life highlights and lowlights, from the music that first inspired him to a defiant I'm-still-here conclusion." The Times critic Will Hodgkinson called the title track a "cheery electro-pop singalong about his unlikely 'one-man rollercoaster' of a career" while noting that "All this proves appealing because Idol’s first album in almost a decade bounces along with an irrepressible spirit and an awareness of his position in the pantheon", concluding that Idol "made his bed, and he's only too happy to lie in it."

Despite this, a few reviews of Dream Into It are negative. The Arts Desk critic Joe Muggs was unimpressed with the album outside of the title track, "Gimme the Weight" and "Still Dancing". He insisted "there's too much adherence to bog-standard LA soft rock and pop-punk cliché," but praised the album for being charming and unique. Still, he concluded the album is too generic and that Idol "still has a truly great album or two in him. This isn’t it, though." Rolling Stone Germany critic Jörg Feyer is most positive of "77", an "okay punk pop" song, but is harsh towards the rest of the album, especially "Still Dancing", an "unscrupulous self-proclaimed climax," and "Wildside", which is "as daring as a Tote Hosen song at a CDU election party." He expressed relief over the short runtime, which is reminiscent of punk albums from 1977, but concludes that "even having three female guests can't really save it."

== Track listing ==
No.	Title	Writer(s)	Length
1.	"Dream Into It"	Billy Idol; Tommy English; Joe Janiak; Martin Reverby; Steve Stevens; Alan Vega	5:05
2.	"77" (featuring Avril Lavigne; vinyl and CD releases do not feature Lavigne)	Idol; English; Nick Long; Stevens	2:54
3.	"Too Much Fun"	Idol; English; Long; Stevens	3:20
4.	"John Wayne" (featuring Alison Mosshart)	Idol; Derek Sherinian; Brian Tichy	4:16
5.	"Wildside" (featuring Joan Jett)	Idol; English; Long; Stevens	3:37
6.	"People I Love"	Idol; English; Long; Stevens	3:40
7.	"Gimme the Weight"	Idol; English; Janiak; Stevens	3:49
8.	"I'm Your Hero"	Idol; English; Janiak; Stevens	4:22
9.	"Still Dancing"	Idol; English; Janiak; Stevens	3:47
Total length:			34:50

== Personnel ==
=== Musicians ===
- Billy Idol – lead vocals, backing vocals
- Steve Stevens – guitars, backing vocals, bass (tracks 2, 5)
- Tommy English – backing vocals, guitars, keyboards, synthesizers, whistle (track 4)
- Chris Chaney – bass
- Josh Freese – drums (tracks 2–9)
- Glen Sobel – drums (track 1)
- Joe Janiak – keyboards (tracks 1, 7, 9), backing vocals (tracks 1, 7, 8)
- Nick Long – guitars (tracks 2, 5), backing vocals (tracks 2, 3, 5, 6)
- Alison Mosshart – featured vocals (track 4)
- Joan Jett – featured vocals (track 5)
- Kitten Kuroi – backing vocals (track 1)
- Maiya Sykes – backing vocals (track 1)
- Ella Vos – backing vocals (tracks 1, 8)
- Jeremy Hatcher – backing vocals (tracks 3, 8, 9)
- Erik Eldenius - backing vocals (track 7)
- Dougie Needles – backing vocals (track 5)
- Kenny Laguna – backing vocals (track 5)
- Avril Lavigne – featured vocals (track 2)

=== Technical ===
- Tommy English – production (all tracks), mixing, engineering
- Jeremy Hatcher – mixing, engineering
- Tony Maserati – mixing (tracks 1–3, 8, 9)
- Alex Miller – engineering
- George Janho – engineering
- Nate Haessly – engineering
- Zack Zajdel – engineering
- Michael Nolasco – engineering
- Matthew Salamone – mixing assistance
- Randy Merrill – mastering

== Charts ==
Weekly chart performance for Dream Into It
Chart (2025)	Peak position
Austrian Albums (Ö3 Austria)	5
Belgian Albums (Ultratop Flanders)	134
Belgian Albums (Ultratop Wallonia)	76
French Rock & Metal Albums (SNEP)	17
German Albums (Offizielle Top 100)	2
Scottish Albums (Official Charts)	12
Swiss Albums (Schweizer Hitparade)	3
UK Albums (Official Charts)	79
UK Independent Albums (Official Charts)	4
US Independent Albums (Billboard)	41
US Top Current Album Sales (Billboard)	7
US Indie Store Album Sales (Billboard)	21
US Vinyl Albums (Billboard)	19
