= The Cage (EP) =

EP by Billy Idol
- Released: 23 September 2022
- Genre: Punk rock
- Length: 13:55
- Label: Dark Horse

Billy Idol chronology
The Roadside (2021)	The Cage (2022)	Dream Into It (2025)

Singles from The Cage
- 1. "Cage" Released: 17 August 2022

The Cage is an extended play (EP) by the English rock singer Billy Idol released on 23 September 2022 by Dark Horse Records. It is Idol's third EP, and the second following The Roadside in 2021. It consists of four songs, including the album's only single, "Cage".

== Critical reception ==
Professional ratings
Review scores
Source	Rating
Classic Rock	3.5/5 stars

When reviewing The Cage for Classic Rock magazine, critic Chris Roberts states that it is "precision-tooled pop-rock, just slightly heavier than it needs to be."

== Track listing ==
No.	Title	Writer(s)	Length
1.	"Cage"	Billy Idol; Steve Stevens; Joe Janiak; Tommy English	2:48
2.	"Running from the Ghost"	Idol; Stevens; Janiak; English	3:51
3.	"Rebel Like You"	Idol; Stevens; Janiak; English	3:42
4.	"Miss Nobody"	Idol; Stevens; Grant Michaels; Sam Hollander	3:34
Total length:			13:56

== Charts ==
Weekly chart performance for The Cage
Chart (2022)	Peak position
German Albums (Offizielle Top 100)	36
Swiss Albums (Schweizer Hitparade)	9
