= Tony Maserati =

American record producer and audio engineer

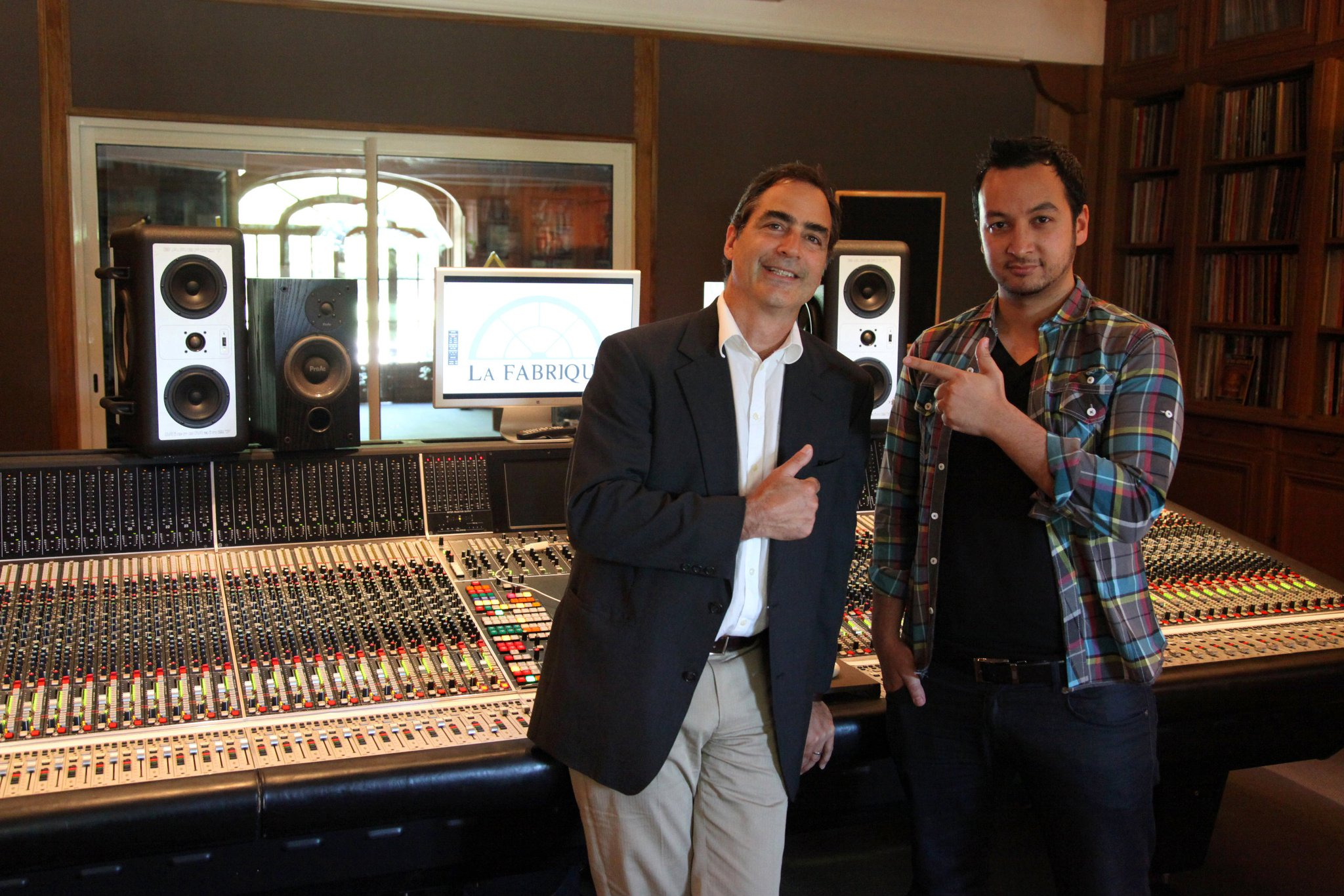
- Skalpovich in Studio with Tony Maserati (pictured left)

Background information
- Genres: Pop; R&B; hip hop; alternative
- Occupation: Mixing engineer
- Years active: 1987–present
- Website: http://tonymaserati.com

Tony Maserati is an American record producer and audio engineer specializing in mixing. He was involved in the development of the New York R&B and hip-hop scene in the 1990s, working with Mary J. Blige, Notorious B.I.G., Puff Daddy, and Queen Latifah. Since then he has worked on Grammy nominated projects with Black Eyed Peas, Beyoncé (who he won Best R&B Album with on her 2003 Dangerously in Love), Jason Mraz, Robin Thicke, and Usher. Maserati won a Latin Grammy in 2006 for his work on Sérgio Mendes’s Timeless. He has been nominated for a total of 10 Grammys, with four for Best Engineered Album, Non-Classical.

In the 2020s, his work has included mixes on Beyoncé's GRAMMY winning Cowboy Carter (2025 Album of the Year and Best Country Album), RAYE's 2026 album This Music May Contain Hope and hit single "Where Is My Husband!", and other releases with Jimin, Jessie Reyez, Big Sean, Renée Rapp, Lola Young, Tate McRae, Selena Gomez, and Tomorrow X Together among others.

== Early life ==
Maserati began college at Northeastern University before transferring to Boston’s Berklee College of Music in the early 1980s. He originally majored in Composition, but switched to the Music Production and Engineering major when it was first offered in 1983. While at Berklee, he learned to mix by doing the sound for the Marsells. He graduated with an MA in 1986.

== Career ==
=== New York hip hop and R&B ===
Maserati went to work in New York City at Sigma Sound Studios where he assisted Glenn Rosenstein. Rosenstein introduced him to Full Force, who helped Maserati learn to arrange and mix. While at Sigma Sound he worked with Whitney Houston and James Brown, and was able to mix his first song, Samantha Fox's "Naughty Girls (Need Love Too)". He credits much of the musical sound he developed on his work at Berklee and the influence of Full Force.

In 1989, Maserati went independent, specializing in mixing, setting him apart at the time since most musical engineers focused on production. During his time at Sigma Sound, Maserati had befriended studio managers around the city, and he contacted them requesting work on R&B and Hip-Hop. While most mixers worked on rock, Maserati claims he focused on R&B and Hip-Hop because it “was the only place where innovation was happening.”

In the 1990s, Maserati was introduced to many major New York R&B and hip-hop artists and mixed albums for Busta Rhymes, Mary J. Blige, The Notorious B.I.G., Faith Evans, and Queen Latifah among others. Maserati regards these years as very collaborative, and he allowed the various artists to work with his analogue equipment to help develop their desired sound. According to Mix magazine, Maserati provided the definitive sound of New York hip-hop in the form of heavy bass lines while also providing high fidelity sounds on the other end of the scale. According to Sound on Sound, the result was a "huge low end and a smooth, velvety high," and which Mix labelled an "outhouse on the bottom, penthouse on the top".

The success of the New York R&B and hip-hop sound propelled Maserati into a widely known and well-established mixer. He received his first four Grammy nominations in 2003, with two nominations for being a part of "Crazy in Love" by Beyoncé featuring Jay-Z and "Where is the Love" by the Black Eyed Peas featuring Justin Timberlake, both of which were up for Record of the Year. He was also nominated for his own work in the Best Engineered Album, Non-Classical for the Black Eyed Peas' Elephunk. He won Best R&B Album that year on Beyoncé's Dangerously in Love. The following year he was nominated again for Album of the Year on Usher's Confessions.

Throughout this period, Maserati worked mostly with analogue consoles rather than digital tools. This required enormous amounts of space and specialized equipment. To fit it all in, Maserati built his own studio, Una Volta, in a barn in upstate New York. In 2008, he began working with his long-time collaborator Jason Mraz on the album We Sing. We Dance. We Steal Things, for which Maserati was nominated for a Grammy in Best Engineered Album, Non-Classical.

=== Los Angeles ===
While his upstate barn provided the needed space for his equipment, Maserati disliked being so far from the city and the intimate collaborations of the studios. Around the same time, the music scene was decamping from New York to the West Coast. In 2010, Maserati moved to Los Angeles where he was able to get large amounts of space while still being within the city. However, he left most of his bulky analogue equipment in New York, which pushed him to adopt more of the digital equipment for mixing and automation.

In 2011, Maserati and songwriter Stefan Skarbek co-founded Mirrorball Entertainment, LLC in North Hollywood. Maserati worked with studio designer and acoustician Martin Pilchner to create modular studios in which each room could be redesigned to meet the specific needs of the production team renting the space. Maserati and Skarbek offered their production services in the space, allowing whole albums to be produced, published, and recorded on site. The integrated approach had Maserati directly mixing major tracks and overseeing the remaining tracks mixed by his assistants and mentees. Maserati is a client with Pulse Recording.

== Grammy Awards ==
Winner

- 2025 Album of the Year: Beyoncé Cowboy Carter
- 2025 Best Country Album: Beyoncé Cowboy Carter
- 2003 Best Contemporary R&B Album: Beyoncé Dangerously in Love

Nominee

- 2017 Best Engineered Album, Non-Classical: K. Flay Every Where is Some Where
- 2016 Album of the Year: Beyoncé Lemonade
- 2014 Album of the Year: Beyoncé Beyoncé
- 2013 Record of the Year: Robin Thicke “Blurred Lines”
- 2012 Best Engineered Album, Non-Classical: Jason Mraz Love is a Four Letter Word
- 2008 Best Engineered Album, Non-Classical: Jason Mraz We Sing. We Dance. We Steal Things
- 2004 Album of the Year: Usher Confessions
- 2003 Best Engineered Album, Non-Classical: The Black Eyed Peas, Elephunk
- 2003 Record of the Year: The Black Eyed Peas “Where is the Love”
- 2003 Record of the Year: Beyoncé “Crazy in Love”

== Selected discography ==
Year	Artist	Title	Role
2026	RAYE	This Music May Contain Hope	Mixing
2026	Nick Jonas	Sunday Best	Mixing
2026	The Pussycat Dolls	"Club Song"	Mixing
2025	Billy Idol	"77 feat. Avril Lavigne"	Mixing
2025	Billy Idol	Dream Into It	Mixing
2024	Beyoncé	Cowboy Carter	Mixing
2024	Jennifer Lopez	"If You Had My Love(2024 Rework)"	Mixing
2024	Jimin	"Slow Dance"	Mixing
2024	Jessie Reyez & Big Sean	"Shut Up"	Mixing
2024	LE SSERAFIM	EASY	Mixing
2023	Jensen McRae	Are You Happy Now	Mixing
2023	Renée Rapp	Everything to Everyone	Mixing
2023	TWICE & Boys Like Girls	"I Can't Stop Me"	Mixing
2022	PSY	"That That" (feat. Suga of BTS)	Mixing
2022	Rosa Linn	SNAP	Mixing
2022	Tomorrow X Together	"Good Boy Gone Bad"	Mixing
2021	Lola Young	Bad Tattoo	Mixing
2021	Lola Young	Fake	Mixing
2021	Stray Kids	NOEASY	Mixing
2021	Tate McRae	"Darkest Hour"	Mixing
2020	Chloe x Halle	Ungodly Hour	Mixing
2020	Mike Posner	Operation: Wake Up	Mixing
2020	Selena Gomez	Rare	Mixing
2019	Anitta	Ugly	Mixing
2019	Beyoncé	The Lion King: The Gift	Mixing
2019	Carly Rae Jepsen	"The Sound"	Mixing
2018	TWICE	What is Love?	Mixing
2018	BØRNS	Blue Madonna	Mixing
2017	TWICE	Signal	Mixing
2017	2 Chainz	Bailan feat. Pharrell	Mixing
2017	BØRNS	Sweet Dreams	Mixing
2017	BØRNS	Faded Love	Mixing
2017	Calum Scott	Dancing on my Own (Tiesto Remix)	Mixing
2017	Chase Atlantic	Chase Atlantic	Mixing
2017	Echosmith	Dear World	
2017	Ed Sheeran & Beyonce	Perfect	Mixing
2017	Fergie	Double Dutchess	Mixing
2017	Jaira Burns	Ugly	Mixing
2017	James Blunt	The Afterlove	Mixing
2017	K. Flay	Everywhere is Somewhere	Mixing
2017	Leon Else	What I won't Do	Mixing
2017	Maggie Rogers	Dog Years	
2017	Mansionz	Wicked feat. G-Eazy	Mixing
2017	Nick Jonas	Home	Mixing
2017	Nick Jonas	Find You	Mixing
2017	Selena Gomez	Only You	Mixing
2017	Sia	To be Human	Mixing
2017	Sofia Reyes feat. Prince Royce	Sólo Yo	
2017	Tinashe	Flame	Mixing
2017	Weezer	Feels like Summer	Mixing
2016	Andra Day	Amen	Mixing
2016	Cerrone	Red Lips	Mixing
2016	Clairy Brown	Pool	Mixing
2016	Demi Lovato	Body Say	Mixing
2016	Fergie	M.I.L.F.$	Mixing
2016	Fitz & the Tantrums	Fitz & the Tantrums	Mixing
2016	Gallant	Ology	Mixing
2016	Gwen Stefani	This Is What the Truth Feels Like	Mixing
2016	Keith Urban	Ripcord	Mixing
2016	Lawson	Perspective	Mixing
2016	Mike Posner	At Night, Alone	Mixing
2016	Nick Jonas	Last Year was Complicated	Mixing
2016	Parachute	Wide Awake	Mixing
2016	Santigold	99 Cents	Mixing
2016	Sawyer Fredericks	A Good Storm	Mixing
2016	Shawn Mendes	Illuminate	Mixing
2015	Andra Day	Cheers to the Fall	Mixing
2015	Conrad Sewell	All I Know	Mixing
2015	Fleur East	Love, Sax & Flashbacks	Mixing
2015	Katherine McPhee	Hysteria	Mixing
2015	Nico & Vinz	Cornerstone	Mixing
2015	Robert DeLong	In the Cards	Mixing
2015	Sabrina Carpenter	Eyes Wide Open	Mixing
2015	Selena Gomez	Revival	Mixing
2015	Selena Gomez	Good for You feat. A$AP Rocky	
2015	Shawn Mendes	Handwritten	Mixing
2014	Aretha Franklin	Sings the Great Diva Classics	Mixing
2014	Cimorelli	Renegade	Mixing
2014	Cris Cab	Where I Belong	Mixing
2014	Jason Mraz	Yes!	Mixing
2014	Jesse McCartney	In Technicolor	Mixing
2014	Jessie J	Sweet Talker	Mixing
2014	Lea Michele	Louder	Mixing
2014	Madeleine Peyroux	Keep me in Your Heart for a While: The Best of Madeleine Peyroux	Mixing
2014	Nick Jonas	Nick Jonas	Mixing
2014	Nico & Vinz	Black Star Elephant	Mixing
2014	Santana	Corazon	Mixing
2013	Ariana Grande	Yours Truly	Mixing
2013	Avril Lavigne	Avril Lavigne	Mixing
2013	Backstreet Boys	In a World Like This	Mixing
2013	Beyonce	Beyonce	Mixing
2013	Cher	Closer to the Truth	Mixing
2013	Daughtry	Baptized	Mixing
2013	Eliza Doolittle	In your Hands	Mixing
2013	James Blunt	Moon Landing	Mixing
2013	Keith Urban	Fuse	Mixing
2013	Lady Gaga	ARTPOP	Mixing
2013	Little Mix	Salute	Mixing
2013	Natalia Kills	Trouble	Mixing
2013	Robin Thicke	Blurred Lines	Mixing
2013	The Wanted	Word of Mouth	Mixing
2012	Alicia Keys	Girl on Fire	Mixing
2012	Jason Mraz	Love is a Four Letter Word	Mixing
2011	Andy Grammer	Andy Grammer	Mixing
2011	Girls' Generation	The Boys	Mixing
2011	Jason Derulo	Future History	Mixing
2011	Javier Colon	Come through for You	Mixing
2011	Madeleine Peyroux	Standing on the Rooftop	Mixing
2011	Robbie Robertson	How to Become Clairvoyant	Mixing
2011	Robin Thicke	Love after War	Mixing
2009	Alicia Keys	The Element of Freedom	Mixing
2009	Chris Brown	Graffiti	Mixing
2009	Colbie Caillat	Breakthrough	Mixing
2009	Pixie Lott	Turn it Up	Mixing
2009	Whitney Houston	I Look to You	Mixing
2008	Britney Spears	Circus	Mixing
2008	Craig David	Officially Yours	Mixing
2008	Jason Mraz	We Sing. We Dance. We Steal Things.	Mixing
2008	Jordan Sparks	No Air	Mixing
2008	Kerli	Love is Dead	Mixing
2008	The Pussycat Dolls	Doll Domination	Mixing
2007	David Bowie	Outside/Heathen	Additional Production, Mixing, Production Remix, Programmer
2007	Kelly Rowland	Ms. Kelly	Mixing
2007	Macy Gray	Big	Mixing
2007	Talib Kweli	Eardrum	Mixing
2007	Will.i.am	Songs about Girls	Mixing
2006	Fergie	Big Girls Don't Cry	Mixing
2006	Paris Hilton	Paris	Mixing
2006	Paris Hilton	Stars are Blind	Mixing
2006	Sergio Mendes	Timeless	Mixing
2005	Mary J. Blige	The Breakthrough	Mixing
2005	Ol' Dirty Bastard	The Definitive Ol' Dirty Bastard Story	Mixing
2005	Rob Thomas	Something to Be	Mixing
2005	The Black Eyed Peas	Monkey Business	Mixing
2005	The Pussycat Dolls	PCD	Mixing
2004	Bruce Hornsby	Halcyon Days	Mixing
2004	John Legend	Get Lifted	Mixing
2004	Kylie Minogue	Body Language	Mixing
2004	Usher	Confessions	Mixing
2003	Beyoncé	Dangerously in Love	Mixing
2003	Jessica Simpson	In This Skin	Mixing
2003	Jessica Simpson	Sweetest Sin	Mixing
2003	Jonny Lang	Long Time Coming	Mixing
2003	Kelly Clarkson	Thankful	Mixing
2003	Mary J. Blige	Love & Life	Mixing
2003	R. Kelly	Chocolate Factory	Mixing
2003	The Black Eyed Peas	Elephunk	Mixing
2002	Baha Men	Move it Like This	Mixing
2002	Christina Aguilera	Stripped	Mixing
2002	Kelly Rowland	Simply Deep	Mixing
2002	Marc Anthony	Mended	Mixing
2002	Mario	Mario	Mixing
2002	Queen Latifah	She's a Queen: A Collection of Greatest Hits	Engineer
2002	Sean Paul	Dutty Rock	Mixing
2001	Alicia Keys	Songs in A Minor	Mixing
2001	Angie Stone	Mahogany Soul	Mixing
2001	Brian McKnight	Superhero	Mixing
2001	Christina Milian	Christina Milian	Mixing
2001	Jennifer Lopez	J.Lo	Mixing
2001	Jessica Simpson	Irresistible	Mixing
2001	Mary J. Blige	No More Drama	Mixing
2000	Lil' Kim	Notorious K.I.M.	Engineer
2000	Mya	Fear of Flying	Mixing
2000	R. Kelly	TP-2.com	Mixing
2000	Ricky Martin	Sound Loaded	Mixing
2000	Ruff Ryders	Ryde or Die, Vol. 2	Mixing
1999	Angie Stone	Black Diamond	
1999	Jennifer Lopez	On the 6	Mixing
1999	Jessica Simpson	Sweet Kisses	Mixing
1999	K-Ci & JoJo	It's Real	Mixing
1999	Puff Daddy	Forever	Engineer
1999	Vitamin C	Vitamin C	Mixing
1998	Faith Evans	Keep the Faith	Mixing
1998	R. Kelly	R.	Mixing
1997	Busta Rhymes	When Disaster Strikes	Engineer, Mixing
1997	Mariah Carey	Butterfly	Mixing
1997	Mase	Harlem World	Mixing
1997	Notorious B.I.G.	Life After Death	Mixing
1997	Puff Daddy & the Family	No Way Out	Mixing
1995	Faith Evans	Faith Evans	Engineer, Mixing
1994	Mary J. Blige	My Life	Engineer, Mixing
1993	David Bowie	Black Tie White Noise	Producer, Mixing
1993	Queen Latifah	Black Reign	Engineer
1992	Mary J. Blige	What's the 411?	Engineer, Mixing, Remixing
1990	C+C Music Factory	Gonna Make You Sweat	Engineer
1989	Patti LaBelle	Be Yourself	Engineer, Mixing
1988	James Brown	I'm Real	Engineer, Editing, Mixing
1987	Whitney Houston	Whitney	Assistant Engineer
