= Atomic Playboys =

- Cover art by H. R. Giger

Studio album by Steve Stevens
- Released: 1989
- Studio: Right Track Recording in New York City; The Enterprise Studios and The Village Recorder in Los Angeles
- Genre: Hard rock, glam metal
- Length: 50:17
- Label: Warner Bros.
- Producer: Steve Stevens, Beau Hill, Ted Templeman

Steve Stevens chronology
Atomic Playboys (1989)	Black Light Syndrome (1997)

Professional ratings
Review scores
Source	Rating
AllMusic	4.5/5 stars

Atomic Playboys is the first studio album by guitarist Steve Stevens, released in 1989 through Warner Bros. Records; a remastered edition containing two bonus tracks was reissued on August 5, 2013 through Rock Candy Records. The album reached No. 119 on the U.S. Billboard 200 chart. The cover art was done by surrealist artist H.R. Giger, who designed the Xenomorph creature in the Alien film series.

Atomic Playboys was also the name of Stevens' band at the time, which was only meant to be a one-album effort upon him being signed to Warner Bros. In a 2001 interview, when asked about the possibility of reforming the group, Stevens replied: "Absolutely not. That group was a very expensive hobby".

== Track listing ==
All tracks written by Steve Stevens, except where noted.

No.	Title	Writer(s)	Length
1.	"Atomic Playboys"		5:47
2.	"Power of Suggestion"		4:37
3.	"Action" (The Sweet cover)	Andy Scott, Mick Tucker, Brian Connolly, Steve Priest	4:44
4.	"Desperate Heart"	Stevens, Perry McCarty, Beau Hill, Fiona	4:33
5.	"Soul on Ice"		3:57
6.	"Crackdown"		5:44
7.	"Pet the Hot Kitty"	Stevens, McCarty, Hill	4:03
8.	"Evening Eye"	Stevens, McCarty	3:56
9.	"Woman of 1,000 Years"		4:21
10.	"Run Across Desert Sands" (instrumental)		3:52
11.	"Slipping into Fiction"		4:43
Total length:			50:17

Japanese edition bonus track
No.	Title	Writer(s)	Length
12.	"Warm Female"	Stevens, Iggy Pop	4:10

2013 remastered edition bonus tracks
No.	Title	Writer(s)	Length
12.	"Warm Female"	Stevens, Pop	4:04
13.	"Action" (The Sweet cover; promo remix)	Scott, Tucker, Connolly, Priest	3:53

== Personnel ==
- Steve Stevens – lead vocals (track 9), guitar, bass (except track 1), production
- Perry McCarty – lead vocals (except tracks 9 & 10)
- Phil Ashley – keyboard, preamplifier
- Thommy Price – drums (except tracks 4, 8)
- Anton Fig – drums (tracks 4, 8)
- Kasim Sulton – bass (track 1)
- Chris Botti – horn (track 2), horn arrangement (track 2)
- Kent Smith – horn (track 2), horn arrangement (track 2)
- Mike Davis – horn (track 2)
- Andy Snitzer – horn (track 2)
- Daniel Wilensky – horn (track 2)
- Paul Winger – background vocals
- Nate Winger – background vocals
- Paulette Brown – background vocals (tracks 2, 9)
- Bunny Hull – background vocals (track 2)
- Fiona – background vocals (track 4)
- Dave Wittman – engineering, mixing
- Debi Cornish – engineering
- Danny Mormando – engineering
- Joel Stoner – engineering
- Jeff DeMorris – engineering
- John Kubick – digital editing
- Ted Jensen – mastering
- Beau Hill – background vocals, production
- Ted Templeman – executive production
- James Hellman - Backline Technician (Technical assistant to Steve Stevens)

== Chart performance ==
Year	Chart	Position
1989	Billboard 200	119

== In popular culture ==
- The title track was used by Australian television network The Nine Network for the closing credits of their Formula One coverage throughout the early 1990s
- The title track features a quote by William H. P. Blandy, who originally said "I am not an atomic playboy" in response to the 1946 atomic bomb tests at Bikini Atoll
- "Power of Suggestion" was featured in the 1994 film Ace Ventura: Pet Detective
