= Bridge of Sighs (Robin Trower album) =

Studio album by Robin Trower
- Released: 20 April 1974
- Recorded: 1973–1974
- Studios: Olympic, London, UK; AIR, London, UK
- Genres: Blues rock, hard rock
- Length: 37:22
- Label: Chrysalis/Capitol
- Producer: Matthew Fisher

Robin Trower chronology
Twice Removed from Yesterday (1973)	Bridge of Sighs (1974)	For Earth Below (1975)

Professional ratings
Review scores
Source	Rating
AllMusic	4.5/5 stars

Bridge of Sighs is the second solo album by guitarist and songwriter Robin Trower. Released in 1974, it was his second album after leaving Procol Harum, and was a commercial breakthrough for Trower. Songs such as "Bridge of Sighs", "Too Rolling Stoned", "Day of the Eagle" and "Little Bit of Sympathy" became live concert staples.

== History ==
The album was produced by organist Matthew Fisher, formerly Trower's bandmate in Procol Harum. Beatles engineer Geoff Emerick was this album's sound engineer.

In an interview with Guitar World, Trower explained how the album got its title. Robin said that he had the first line of the song for years and one day saw some sport pages which listed a racehorse called Bridge of Sighs, which he thought would be a great title. The horse likely got its name from the famous Bridge of Sighs in Venice, Italy, built in the 1600s.

Bridge of Sighs was the second Trower release to feature cover art by "Funky" Paul Olsen, the first being 1973's Twice Removed from Yesterday. Early printings of the original album cover had the front image upside-down and were more greenish in colour. The album reached Number 7 in the United States during a chart stay of 31 weeks. It was certified Gold on 10 September 1974.

The album was remastered and remixed in 1999 with five bonus tracks recorded on 29 May 1974 for KMET radio at The Record Plant in Los Angeles. It was remastered once again and released in 2007 with eight bonus tracks from BBC Radio 1's "John Peel Sessions" made on 28 January and 5 March shows.

A four-CD expanded version was released in 2024. It includes 2024 remaster of album, outtakes and full performance of concert from 1999 reissue.

== Cover versions ==
The title track was covered by guitarist George Lynch formerly of Dokken for his 2005 album, Furious George It was also covered by Opeth for the special edition of their 2008 album, Watershed. Steve Lukather covered it for his 2021 album, I Found the Sun Again, and Ann Wilson of Heart covered it for her 2022 solo album, Fierce Bliss A segment of it also appears as a hidden track on Metallica's 1998 cover album Garage Inc. It was covered by the Mountain Goats and released in a 2 part EP Aquarium Drunkard's Lagniappe Session.

"Day of the Eagle" was covered by Billy Idol guitarist Steve Stevens on his third solo album Memory Crash (2008). Tesla also covered the song on their 2007 Real to Reel album as did Armored Saint on their Nod to the Old School record.

"Too Rolling Stoned" was covered by Drivin N Cryin with Warren Haynes for the 1995 Hempilation benefit compilation album. Guitarist Michael Schenker and former Gamma and Robin Trower singer Davey Pattison covered it in 2005 for their second 'Schenker Pattison Summit' album, The Endless Jam Continues. In 2017, UFO included the song on their covers album, The Salentino Cuts.

== Track listing ==
All tracks are written by Robin Trower, except where indicated.

Side one
No.	Title	Writer(s)	Length
1.	"Day of the Eagle"		4:59
2.	"Bridge of Sighs"		5:05
3.	"In This Place"		4:28
4.	"The Fool and Me"	James Dewar, Robin Trower	3:57
Total length:			17:29

Side two
No.	Title	Writer(s)	Length
5.	"Too Rolling Stoned"		7:29
6.	"About to Begin"		3:43
7.	"Lady Love"	James Dewar, Robin Trower	3:21
8.	"Little Bit of Sympathy"		4:20
Total length:			18:53

1996 Mobile Fidelity UDCD 684
No.	Title	Length
9.	"Day Of The Eagle" (Single Version)	2:56

1999 reissue: bonus tracks
No.	Title	Writer(s)	Length
9.	"Day Of The Eagle" (Live)		3:49
10.	"Bridge Of Sighs" (Live)		5:16
11.	"Too Rolling Stoned" (Live)		6:27
12.	"Lady Love" (Live)	James Dewar, Robin Trower	3:13
13.	"Little Bit Of Sympathy" (Live)		4:48

2007 reissue: bonus tracks
No.	Title	Writer(s)	Length
9.	"Bridge of Sighs" (John Peel BBC Session)		4:54
10.	"In This Place" (John Peel BBC Session)		4:04
11.	"Alethea" (John Peel BBC Session)		3:55
12.	"Little Bit Of Sympathy" (John Peel BBC Session)		3:52
13.	"Fine Day" (John Peel BBC Session)	James Dewar, Robin Trower	3:22
14.	"Confessin' Midnight" (John Peel BBC Session)		4:47
15.	"It's Only Money" (John Peel BBC Session)		5:01
16.	"Gonna Be More Suspicious" (John Peel BBC Session)	James Dewar, Robin Trower	2:58

=== 50th Anniversary Edition ===
2024 reissue - disc one: Bridge of Sighs 2024 remaster
No.	Title	Length

2024 reissue - disc two: 2024 Stereo Mix with longer/unedited versions + Outtakes & Rarities
No.	Title	Writer(s)	Length
1.	"USA Radio Spot 1"		0:14
10.	"USA Radio Spot 2"		1:05
11.	"Day Of The Eagle (Instrumental Rehearsal)"		3:50
12.	"Bridge Of Sighs (Outtake)"		5:47
13.	"The Fool And Me (Instrumental Outtake)"	James Dewar, Robin Trower	5:21
14.	"Lady Love (Extended Outtake)"		4:02
15.	"Little Bit Of Sympathy (Alternate Take)"		2:00
16.	"Lady Love (Early Version)"	James Dewar, Robin Trower	4:04
17.	"Day Of The Eagle (Single Version)"		2:58
18.	"USA Radio Spot 3"		1:02

2024 reissue - disc three: Live at The Record Plant, Sausalito, USA (29th May 1974)
No.	Title	Writer(s)	Length
1.	"Twice Removed From Yesterday"	James Dewar, Robin Trower	3:57
2.	"Bridge Of Sighs"		5:25
3.	"Alethea"		4:24
4.	"Lady Love"	James Dewar, Robin Trower	3:15
5.	"Daydream"	James Dewar, Robin Trower	6:45
6.	"Too Rolling Stoned"		6:18
7.	"I Can't Wait Much Longer"	Frankie Miller, Robin Trower	6:19
8.	"Day Of The Eagle"		4:09
9.	"Little Bit Of Sympathy"		5:04
10.	"Rock Me Baby"	Riley B. King, Joe Josea	5:01

== Personnel ==
- Robin Trower – guitar
- James Dewar – bass, vocals
- Reg Isidore – drums

=== Additional personnel ===
- Matthew Fisher – producer
- Geoff Emerick – sound engineer

== Charts ==
Chart (1974)	Peak position
Australia (Kent Music Report)	41
United States (Billboard 200)	7
