= Flamenco a Go-Go =

Flamenco A Go-Go

Studio album by Steve Stevens
- Released: 2000
- Recorded: Home Studio
- Genres: Flamenco, blues, dance
- Length: 55:23
- Label: Ark 21
- Producer: Steve Stevens

Steve Stevens chronology
Situation Dangerous (2000)	Flamenco A Go-Go (2000)	Memory Crash (2008)

Flamenco A Go-Go is the second album released by guitarist and songwriter Steve Stevens, best known for playing for Billy Idol for several years. It was recorded in his home studio, and is mostly an instrumental album with a few vocal sections.

== Musical genres and influences ==
Despite the title, the album is not a traditional flamenco album.

Stevens reported drawing inspiration from noted flamenco player Paco de Lucía after seeing him play live. The album features acoustic Spanish guitar but also departs from the flamenco genre by including electric guitar, drum and bass loops, electronics, ambient sounds and midi gear. It has contributions from session musicians Greg Ellis (percussion) and Vinnie Colaiuta (drums).

== Reviews ==
Professional ratings
Review scores
Source	Rating
AllMusic	4.5/5 stars

AllMusic was very positive, calling it a "wonderful surprise", by "one of the finest guitarists of the past 20 years" and saying it will catch listeners "off guard", with dance record overtones and rhythms that will "grab every listener".

Stevens said at the time:

I kind of reached an end to playing real loud, aggressive stuff. With the shred guitar thing, it always seems like I was playing to guys who were standing there with score cards or something. We weren’t creating an emotional event - it was a gymnastic event.

== Track listing ==
1. "Flamenco a Go-Go"
2. "Cinecitta"
3. "Our Man in Istanbul"
4. "Letter to a Memory"
5. "Feminova"
6. "Velvet Cage"
7. "Hanina" Featuring Faudel
8. "Dementia"
9. "Twilight in Your Hands"
10. "Riviera"
11. "Jazz...An Evil Power" (Japanese Edition Bonus Track)
