= Susan Holmes =

American fashion designer

Susan Holmes McKagan
- Born: Susan Elizabeth Holmes; May 5, 1972 (age 54); Bowling Green, Ohio, U.S.
- Spouse: Duff McKagan (m. 1999)
- Children: 2
- Modeling information
- Height: 5 ft 10 in (1.78 m)
- Hair color: Blonde
- Eye color: Brown
- Website: www.susanholmes.net

Susan Elizabeth Holmes McKagan (born May 5, 1972) is an American model, media personality, and fashion designer, and author who rose to prominence during the supermodel era of the early 1990s. She is the public face and founder of Susan Holmes Swimwear. According to an interview by Elsa Klensch on CNN, Holmes was called "The Body" by fashion photographer Steven Meisel.

== Early life ==
Susan Holmes was born in Bowling Green, Ohio, where her father was a professor and her mother was an English teacher. She moved to San Diego when she was 9, and began modeling locally in high school. She was discovered at 16 by photographer Marco Glaviano while she was visiting New York City. He approached her at a restaurant and arranged a meeting with Ford Models.

== Career ==
=== Modeling ===
Holmes began modeling professionally in the early 1990s, becoming one of the highest-paid supermodels within a few years, at times earning 6 figures within 5 days. She has walked runways for designers including Versace, Valentino, Karl Lagerfeld, Prada, Chanel, and Victoria's Secret, and has featured in campaigns for brands such as Yves Saint Laurent, Dolce & Gabbana, Donna Karan, and Guess. She has appeared on covers and featured in international magazines including Vogue, Glamour, Elle, Marie Claire, Harper's Bazaar, Cosmopolitan, and Maxim, shot by photographers including Sante D'Orazio, Arthur Elgort, and Steven Meisel.

In September 2025, Holmes returned to the runway for Christian Siriano SS26 as part of New York Fashion Week, which was praised for "rewriting what longevity looks like in an industry obsessed with the next new face."

=== Swimwear ===
Holmes is the founder and designer of Susan Holmes Swimwear, a brand of swim and resort wear that prioritizes sustainable production. When she couldn't model during her first pregnancy, Holmes began designing swimsuits and launched her brand in 1997. Holmes has said that becoming a swimsuit designer gave her "a deep respect for the business side of fashion." The brand has been featured in several Sports Illustrated Swimsuit issues, including on the cover, and in Bar Refaeli's shoot from the 2007 issue, which was recreated on Emily Ratajkowski in the 2014 issue. Her clothing designs have appeared on TvLand's "She's Got The Look".

=== Media ===
Holmes’ early acting credits include the 1992 movie Inferno alongside Kate Moss among other models, and the music video for Velvet Revolver's "Fall To Pieces". In 2008, Holmes was a creative director for a shoot alongside Russell James, celebrity guest judge and mentor/designer to the aspiring models wearing her swimwear on America's Next Top Model (Cycle 11 - You’re Beautiful, Now Change) alongside Tyra Banks. Holmes was featured on E!'s reality docuseries series Married to Rock which debuted on November 7, 2010, and followed Holmes alongside other rock musician spouses Etty Farrell and Josie Stevens. In January 2020 Holmes was a guest on the Rachael Ray Show where she prepared her vegan dog treats recipe and promoted her book The Velvet Rose. Holmes appeared as herself in the 2013 documentary Isolated and the 2024 mockumentary Standing on the Shoulders of Kitties.

Susan and her husband Duff McKagan co-host the weekly radio show "Three Chords and The Truth" on the SiriusXM station Ozzy's Boneyard.

=== Writing ===
In 2019, Holmes released her debut novel The Velvet Rose. Published by Rare Bird Books and distributed by Simon & Schuster, the book is a fictionalized retelling of her early career drawing on her experiences in fashion and rock music. In writing the novel, Holmes looked to capture the "extraordinary 90’s era where fashion and music collided in such a historical and vibrant way" from the perspective of a female protagonist in the "male-dominated rock world". The novel sold out on Amazon and Barnes & Noble on its first day of release. Holmes has expressed interest in writing a second novel, and took remote writing classes at Harvard during COVID. Holmes has also written articles for HuffPost, including interviews with Cindy Crawford, Snoop Dogg, Moby, and Billy Bob Thornton.

== Activism ==
Susan has spoken out against fur, appearing in the PETA ad campaign "Ink, Not Mink" alongside Duff McKagan.

In 2012, Holmes co-hosted the Surfrider Foundation's International Surfing Day web-a-thon.

In 2017, Holmes walked the catwalk for designer Francesco Scognamiglio at Life Ball in Vienna, organized by the nonprofit organization AIDS LIFE.

In 2018, Holmes was an ambassador for the 2018 Special Olympics USA Games held in Seattle.

Holmes donates a portion of proceeds from the sales of her book The Velvet Rose to the MusiCares Foundation.

== Personal life ==
Susan Holmes married Guns N' Roses bassist and Velvet Revolver founding member Duff McKagan in 1999. The pair met in 1996 on a date set up by a mutual friend after McKagan saw photographs of Susan in Allure magazine. Together they have two daughters Grace and Mae. Both women model, and Mae has appeared on the catwalk alongside her mother.

Susan primarily resides in Seattle, but has homes in Los Angeles, San Diego and Maui.
