= Welcome to the Wasteland =

Welcome to the Wasteland may refer to:

- Welcome to the Wasteland (Logan album)
- Welcome to the Wasteland (Bad City album)
