= Memory Crash =

Studio album by Steve Stevens
- Released: January 29, 2008
- Studio: The Purple Room, West Hollywood
- Genre: Instrumental rock, hard rock
- Length: 53:45
- Label: Magna Carta
- Producer: Steve Stevens

Steve Stevens chronology
Flamenco a Go-Go (2000)	Memory Crash (2008)

Professional ratings
Review scores
Source	Rating
AllMusic	3.5/5 stars

Memory Crash is the third studio album by guitarist and songwriter Steve Stevens, released on January 29, 2008, through Magna Carta Records.

== Background ==
Memory Crash comes some eight years after Stevens' previous solo album, Flamenco A Go-Go. It is a mostly instrumental album with help from Doug Pinnick of King's X, and featuring drummer Brian Tichy. Stevens and Tichy had previously worked together with Billy Idol.

== Musical genres and influences ==
Stevens has put a lot of "weird little segues" into this album, a feature that has impressed him from albums such as Pink Floyd's The Dark Side of the Moon. Other influences include Jimi Hendrix, particularly on Stevens' interpretation of Robin Trower's Day of the Eagle, as well as Led Zeppelin, King Crimson, and even Emerson, Lake & Palmer, Bo Diddley, and Jeff Beck. Stevens has said that he spent a lot of time listening to bands such as Pink Floyd and Yes prior to making this album, "just soaking up what made them tick". During the recording, Stevens used the Marshall Half Stack he had previously used while recording Rebel Yell with Billy Idol.

Record label Magna Carta describes this album as, "...an electro-centric sonic tour de force... No gimmicks. No over-the-top production. No compromising... Just Steve Stevens, his guitar, and his beloved effects..."

== Track listing ==
All tracks are written by Steve Stevens, except where noted.

No.	Title	Length
1.	"Heavy Horizon"	2:04
2.	"Hellcats Take the Highway"	5:32
3.	"Memory Crash"	5:06
4.	"Water on Ares"	5:51
5.	"Day of the Eagle" (Robin Trower)	5:46
6.	"Small Arms Fire"	7:30
7.	"Cherry Vanilla"	7:29
8.	"Joshua Light Show"	1:52
9.	"Prime Mover"	6:13
10.	"Josephine"	6:22
Total length:		53:45

== Personnel ==
- Steve Stevens – vocals (track 10), guitar, bass (except track 5), engineering, production
- Brian Tichy – drums, percussion
- Doug Pinnick – vocals (track 5), bass (track 5)
- Beazle T. Monk – engineering
- Michael Parnin – engineering, mixing
- Josh Hertz – engineering
- Mike Bozzi – engineering
