= Happiness (Robert Palmer song) =

Single by Robert Palmer

from the album Don't Explain
- B-side: "All Shook Up"
- Released: 2 April 1991
- Genre: Rock; pop
- Length: 2:51
- Label: EMI
- Songwriter: Robert Palmer
- Producers: Teo Macero; Robert Palmer

Robert Palmer singles chronology
"Mercy Mercy Me" / "I Want You" (medley) (1990)	"Happiness" (1991)	"Dreams to Remember" (1991)

Audio video
- "Happiness" on YouTube

"Happiness" is a song by the English vocalist Robert Palmer, which was released in 1991 as the fifth and final single from his tenth studio album Don't Explain. The song was written by Palmer, and produced by Teo Macero and Palmer.

As the final single from Don't Explain, "Happiness" saw limited commercial success, failing to chart in the UK and peaking at number 62 in Germany.

== Release ==
"Happiness" was released on 7-inch vinyl, 12-inch vinyl and CD in the UK and various European countries. The B-side is a cover of the 1957 Elvis Presley hit "All Shook Up". For the 12-inch and CD formats, a "12" Remix" of "Happiness" was included, remixed by Carl McKintosh.

== Critical reception ==
On its release, Music & Media wrote, "When it comes to careless swing, Palmer is the absolute lord and master. This follow-up to 'Mercy, Mercy' offers a respite from the rat race of EHR." Peter Stanton of Record Mirror concluded, "Mr Palmer has done better in his illustrious career, but he's at the stage now where if he just belched on a record, that would probably get into the top 20." Jon Wilde of Melody Maker was critical of the song, describing it as "a fidgety piece of soft-headed funk that ambles aimlessly all over the knocking shop like an inebriated trollop with obligatory wart on nose".

Accrington Observer gave a three out of five star rating and wrote, "Change of direction, with a pop song that's got an almost calypso feel to it. Should be a hit." Penny Kiley of the Liverpool Echo described the song as "catchy" and noted the "brash brassy arrangement", "laid-back vocals" and "nice, optimistic words". She added that Palmer's version of "All Shook Up" was "distinctive".

In a retrospective review of Don't Explain, Terry Staunton of Record Collector felt that both "I'll Be Your Baby Tonight" and "Mercy Mercy Me" were "both pedestrian compared to the thrust and swagger of originals 'Mess Around' and 'Happiness'." Paul Sinclair of Super Deluxe Edition said, "You do have to forgive Palmer some charmless excursions into heavy-ish rock. Much better are tracks like the poppy 'Happiness'."

== Track listing ==
7-inch single

1. "Happiness" - 2:51
2. "All Shook Up" - 2:46

12-inch single

1. "Happiness (12" Remix)" - 5:22
2. "All Shook Up" - 2:46
3. "Happiness (7" Version)" - 2:51

CD single

1. "Happiness (7" Version)" - 2:52
2. "Happiness (12" Remix)" - 5:20
3. "All Shook Up" - 2:47

== Personnel ==
Production

- Robert Palmer - producer
- Teo Macero - producer of "Happiness"
- Eric "E.T." Thorngren - mixing on "Happiness"
- Carl McKintosh - remixer of "Happiness (Extended Remix)"
- David Harper - executive producer
- Timothy Greenfield Saunders - photography
- Bill Smith Studio - design

== Charts ==
Chart (1991)	Peak position
German Singles Chart	62
UK Playlist Chart (Music Week)	19
