= Married to Rock =

- Genre: Documentary
- Starring: AJ Celi; Etty Farrell; Josie Stevens; Susan Holmes McKagan
- Country of origin: United States
- No. of seasons: 1
- No. of episodes: 8

Production
- Executive producers: Farnaz Farjam; Gil Goldschein; Jeff Jenkins; Jonathan Murray
- Running time: 21 to 24 minutes (excluding commercials)
- Production company: Bunim/Murray Productions

Original release
- Network: E!
- Release: November 7 – December 26, 2010

Married to Rock is an American reality documentary television series on E! that debuted November 7, 2010.

== Synopsis ==
The series focuses on the lives of the spouses of four rock musicians and also attempts to debunk common myths about the lifestyles of rock artists and their families.

== Cast ==
- AJ Celi — girlfriend of Billy Duffy (guitarist for The Cult)
- Etty Farrell — wife of Perry Farrell (singer for Jane's Addiction)
- Josie Stevens — wife of Steve Stevens (guitarist for Billy Idol and soloist)
- Susan Holmes McKagan — wife of Duff McKagan (bassist for Velvet Revolver and Guns N' Roses)

== Episodes ==
No.	Title	Original release date	U.S. viewers (millions)
1	"Kiss & Tell"	November 7, 2010	1.28
2	"Naked Hearts"	November 14, 2010	1.02
3	"Josie Is a Doll"	November 21, 2010	0.78
4	"White Wedding"	November 28, 2010	1.06
5	"The Proposal"	December 5, 2010	1.07
6	"Rock Bus"	December 12, 2010	1.08
7	"I Always Feel Like Somebody's Watchin' Me"	December 19, 2010	0.93
8	"Moving On"	December 26, 2010	N/A
