= Young & Dumb (song) =

2025 single by Avril Lavgine and Simple Plan

Single by Avril Lavigne and Simple Plan
- Released: May 9, 2025
- Genre: Pop-punk
- Label: Big Noise
- Songwriters: Avril Lavigne; Chuck Comeau; John Feldmann; Pierre Bouvier
- Producer: John Feldmann

Avril Lavigne singles chronology
"77" (2025)	"Young & Dumb" (2025)

Simple Plan singles chronology
"Wake Me Up (When This Nightmare's Over)" (2022)	"Young & Dumb" (2025)

Music video
- "Young & Dumb" on YouTube

"Young & Dumb" is a song by Canadian singer Avril Lavigne and Canadian band Simple Plan. It was released on May 9, 2025, through Big Noise, as the support single for the second leg of Lavigne's Greatest Hits Tour. Simple Plan was announced as the opening act for the second leg of the tour and this collaboration replaced All Time Low's "Fake as Hell" as the joint performance piece during live shows.

== Background and promotion ==
Following the success of Lavigne's Greatest Hits Tour in 2024, a second leg was announced for summer 2025. In March 2025, Lavigne began teasing new music on Instagram by posting the lyric "I'm still thinking about that summer… when we had each other" along with the question, "Who'd want to hear a new song before the tour?". On May 5, 2025, she shared another image featuring a new forearm tattoo that read "young & dumb". Later the same day she revealed that a new collaborative single with Simple Plan, titled "Young & Dumb", would be released in support of the tour. The two acts had previously toured together in 2003 during Lavigne's Try to Shut Me Up Tour, supporting her debut album, Let Go, and reunited again on the 2024 Greatest Hits Tour. In a social media post, Lavigne described the collaboration as "a full circle moment", highlighting their longstanding friendship and shared beginnings in the early 2000s Canadian pop punk scene. On May 7, 2025, Lavigne and Simple Plan teased the song on social media with a clip featuring both artists lip-syncing their vocals on a tour bus.

== Composition and themes ==
"Young & Dumb" was written by Lavigne along with members of Simple Plan, with production handled by John Feldmann. The song has been described as an ode to nostalgia, friendship, and adolescence, aimed at listeners who grew up with both artists. "Young & Dumb" is characterized as a percussion-driven throwback anthem that encapsulates the nostalgia of early 2000s pop-punk and aims to capture a sense of nostalgia while celebrating the present and is dedicated to fans who have supported both artists for over two decades.

== Music video ==
The accompanying music video, released on May 9, 2025, features Lavigne and Simple Plan performing at a vintage motel, including scenes in an empty pool and playful antics around the property.

== Charts ==
=== Weekly charts ===
Chart performance for "Young & Dumb"
Chart (2025)	Peak position
Australia Digital Tracks (ARIA)	18
Canada Digital Song Sales (Billboard)	9
Canada Hot AC (Billboard)	27
Central America Anglo Airplay (Monitor Latino)	10
Costa Rica Anglo Airplay (Monitor Latino)	5
Italy Rock Airplay (EarOne)	16
Japan Hot Overseas (Billboard)	8
New Zealand Hot Singles (RMNZ)	33
Nicaragua Anglo Airplay (Monitor Latino)	2
Panama Anglo Airplay (Monitor Latino)	9
UK Singles Downloads (OCC)	31
UK Singles Sales (OCC)	32
US Alternative Digital Song Sales (Billboard)	3
US Rock Digital Song Sales (Billboard)	4

=== Yearly charts ===
Year-end chart performance for "Young & Dumb"
Chart (2025)	Position
Canada Hot AC (Billboard)	54

== Release history ==
"Young & Dumb" release history
Region	Date	Format(s)	Label	Ref.
Various	May 9, 2025	Digital download; streaming	Big Noise	
