= Bad City =

American rock band (2008–2011)

- Origin: Chicago, Illinois United States
- Genres: Hard rock, glam metal
- Years active: 2008–2011
- Label: Atlantic Records
- Past members: Josh Caddy; Alec Cyganowski; Tommy English; Kevin Kane; Max Perenchio; Jake Serek; Rich Vallone; Rich Lombardo
- Website: www.badcitymusic.com

Bad City was a five-piece rock band from Chicago, Illinois. They were signed to Atlantic Records in 2010. The band released their debut album Welcome to the Wasteland, produced by Grammy Award nominated producer Johnny K, on August 24, 2010.

== History ==
Bad City was formed in early 2010, but began in 2008 when Chicago-based band Powerspace, including members Kevin Kane and Tommy English, recruited Chicago natives Max Perenchio and Jake Serek as touring musicians. Before Powerspace broke up, Perenchio and Schleiter began writing songs together for a new project. Temecula, California vocalist Josh Caddy soon finalized the lineup, which became known as Bad City. The band's name is inspired by its members' experience producing their first album in an unfavorable neighborhood in western Chicago, which they referred to as a "bad city".

After the completion of their debut album, the band gained the attention of Billy Corgan of The Smashing Pumpkins, who invited them to his 2010 Summer Rock 'n' Roll Party tour. In August 2010, Kiss frontman Paul Stanley noticed Bad City's song "Call Paul Stanley" and further endorsed the band, calling their album "an absolute knockout and the best album I've heard in ages. A killer, cohesive album of great rock and bombastic production that has been sorely missing. Every track is a winner and Bad City raises the bar out of most band's reach. It's really that good". After a midwest tour with Hinder, Bad City continued supporting Welcome to the Wasteland on another tour with The Smashing Pumpkins, followed by Canadian and West Coast shows with Slash. The album reached U.S. No. 182.

Bad City performed the theme song, "Fight as One", for the Marvel Entertainment animated television series The Avengers: Earth's Mightiest Heroes. Their song "Take Me for a Ride" was featured in the Peacemaker episode "Back to the Suture".

In June 2011, Caddy left the band and was replaced by former Powerspace vocalist Alec Cyganowski. That December, Bad City played a farewell show in Chicago and disbanded.

Max Perenchio died in a single-vehicle car crash on November 26, 2020, aged 33.

== Musical style ==
Bad City is praised for its anachronistic mixture of various rock genres, including 70s Kiss and Alice Cooper-inspired hard rock, ambitious 1990s alternative rock such as Smashing Pumpkins and Soundgarden, 80s-style sleaze metal, 2000-era riff-rock oriented bands such as The White Stripes, and power pop a la Cheap Trick. Regarding influences, Caddy said, "We took influences from all our favorite bands which happen to be from different decades, modernized it and brought it to a new level." Upon the release of Welcome to the Wasteland, many critics pinned the band as hair metal. Perenchio responded, "I think it's a semantic issue. I think people hear harmonized guitar solos, big hooks, and gang vocals and quickly assume Hair Metal for convenience sake. It's just a label, it's not a big deal. When I think of Hair Metal I think of a very cookie-cutter period that lifted the aesthetic value of Ratt's Out of the Cellar and drove it into the depths of decadence. I don't really associate Bad City with that, and our hair isn't nearly big enough."

== Members ==
- Josh Caddy - lead vocals (2010-June 2011)
- Alec Cyganowski - lead vocals (June–December 2011)
- Tommy English - guitar (2010-2011)
- Kevin Kane - drums (2010-2011)
- Max Perenchio - guitar
- Jake Serek - bass
- Rich Vallone - guitar (2011)
- Rich Lombardo - drums (2011)

== Discography ==
=== Studio albums ===
- Welcome to the Wasteland (2010)
