= Bozzio Levin Stevens =

US musical group

- Origin: United States
- Genres: Progressive rock, progressive metal, jazz rock
- Years active: 1997-2000
- Labels: Magna Carta Records
- Members: Terry Bozzio; Steve Stevens; Tony Levin

Bozzio Levin Stevens is an American supergroup power trio formed by drummer Terry Bozzio (Frank Zappa, U.K., Missing Persons, Steve Vai, Jeff Beck), bassist and Chapman Stick player Tony Levin (Peter Gabriel, King Crimson, Liquid Tension Experiment) and guitarist Steve Stevens (Billy Idol, Michael Jackson, Vince Neil). They have recorded two albums via Magna Carta.

Their music is mostly improvised and touches on rock, fusion, jazz and instrumental classical styles.

== Discography ==
Title	Album details	Peak chart positions
Title	Album details	JPN
Black Light Syndrome	Released: July 15, 1997; Label: Magna Carta Records; Formats: CD, LP, digital download	82
Situation Dangerous	Released: August 8, 2000; Label: Magna Carta Records; Formats: CD, LP, digital download	79
"—" denotes a recording that did not chart or was not released in that territory.
