= You're Amazing =

Single by Robert Palmer

from the album Don't Explain
- B-side: "So Emboldened"
- Released: November 1990
- Genre: Rock; pop
- Length: 3:50
- Label: EMI (US)
- Songwriters: Steven Fellows; Alan Mansfield; Robert Palmer; Guy Pratt; Steve Stevens
- Producer: Robert Palmer

Robert Palmer singles chronology
"I'll Be Your Baby Tonight" (1990)	"You're Amazing" (1990)	"Mercy Mercy Me" / "I Want You" (medley) (1991)

Audio video
- "You're Amazing" on YouTube

"You're Amazing" is a song by English vocalist Robert Palmer, which was released in November 1990 as the second single from his tenth studio album Don't Explain. It was written by Steven Fellows, Alan Mansfield, Palmer, Guy Pratt and Steve Stevens, and produced by Palmer.

In the US, "You're Amazing" peaked at No. 28 on the Billboard Hot 100, and No. 5 on Billboard Top Rock Tracks chart. A music video was filmed to promote the single.

== Critical reception ==
Upon release, Billboard commented: "Palmer's reliably strong soul stylings added to headbanger guitar riffs and sweet background harmonies proves to be a quirky, but potent, combination." In a retrospective review of Don't Explain, Paul Sinclair of Super Deluxe Edition listed the song as one of the album's "charmless excursions into heavy-ish rock".

== Track listing ==
Cassette single

1. "You're Amazing" – 3:50
2. "So Emboldened" – 3:14

CD single (American promotional #1 – Remixed Version)

1. "You're Amazing" – 3:35

CD single (American promotional #2)

1. "You're Amazing" – 3:50

CD single (Japanese release)

1. "You're Amazing" – 3:50
2. "I'll Be Your Baby Tonight" – 3:26
3. "Deep End" – 4:32

== Personnel ==
- Robert Palmer – lead vocals, producer ("You're Amazing", "So Emboldened", "I'll Be Your Baby Tonight", "Deep End")
- Mike Fraser – mixing ("You're Amazing" – American promotional version)
- UB40 – producer ("Deep End")

== Charts ==
Chart performance for "You're Amazing"
Chart (1990–1991)	Peak position
Australia (ARIA)	103
Canadian Singles Chart	14
US Billboard Hot 100	28
US Billboard Top Rock Tracks	5
