= Don't Explain (Robert Palmer album) =

Studio album by Robert Palmer
- Released: 5 November 1990
- Studio: Logic (Milan)
- Genres: Rock; Reggae; Jazz; Traditional pop; R&B
- Length: 66:33
- Label: EMI
- Producers: Teo Macero; Robert Palmer

Robert Palmer chronology
Addictions: Volume 1 (1989)	Don't Explain (1990)	Addictions: Volume 2 (1992)

Singles from Don't Explain
- 1. "I'll Be Your Baby Tonight" Released: 22 October 1990; 2. "You're Amazing" Released: November 1990 (US); 3. "Mercy Mercy Me/I Want You" Released: 24 December 1990; 4. "Happiness" Released: 2 April 1991; 5. "Dreams to Remember" Released: 3 June 1991

Professional ratings
Review scores
Source	Rating
AllMusic	2/5 stars
Billboard	favourable
New Musical Express	6/10
Record Mirror	2.5/5 stars

Don't Explain is the tenth solo studio album by English singer-songwriter Robert Palmer, released by EMI on 5 November 1990. During the course of its 18 tracks, Palmer displays rock, R&B, jazz and reggae influences. Several classic songs are covered, as well. The album peaked at number 9 in the UK and number 88 in the US.

In the UK the album was certified Gold by the BPI in November 1990.

== Reception ==
Reviewed at the time of release, NME described Palmer as "just a playboy dilettante dabbling in populist genres clumsily. His true heart lies in...who knows. Just as we arrive to soak up his ever-changing mood, Bob the eternal tourist is off somewhere else."

== Track listing ==
No.	Title	Writer(s)	Length
1.	"Your Mother Should Have Told You"	Robert Palmer; Guy Pratt	3:41
2.	"Light-Years"	Palmer; Divinyls	4:27
3.	"You Can't Get Enough of a Good Thing"	Palmer	4:08
4.	"Dreams to Remember"	Otis Redding; Zelda Reading; Joe Rock	4:25
5.	"You're Amazing"	Palmer; Pratt; Stephen Fellows; Alan Mansfield; Steve Stevens	3:49
6.	"Mess Around"	Palmer; Fellows	4:50
7.	"Happiness"	Palmer	2:52
8.	"History"	Palmer	4:32
9.	"I'll Be Your Baby Tonight" (with UB40)	Bob Dylan	3:26
10.	"Housework"	Palmer; Fellows	3:12
11.	"Mercy Mercy Me / I Want You"	Marvin Gaye: Arthur "T-Boy" Ross; Leon Ware	5:59
12.	"Don't Explain"	Arthur Herzog Jr.; Billie Holiday	2:28
13.	"Aeroplane"	Palmer	3:04
14.	"People Will Say We're in Love"	Rodgers and Hammerstein	2:20
15.	"Not a Word"	Palmer; Pratt; Colin Vearncombe	4:18
16.	"Top 40"	Mose Allison	2:40
17.	"You're So Desirable"	Ray Noble	2:24
18.	"You're My Thrill"	Sidney Clare; Jay Gorney	3:58
Total length:			66:33

Note:

- The liner notes for the first US pressing (EMI/Capitol – CDP-7-93935-2) attribute the final song to Ned Washington and Burton Lane. While they co-wrote a song by that name, the one on Palmer's album is the Clare & Gorney composition made popular by Billie Holiday.

== Personnel ==
- Robert Palmer – vocals, backing vocals, guitars, drums
- Brent Bourgeois – keyboards, backing vocals (2, 3)
- Alan Mansfield – keyboards, drums
- William Bryant – acoustic piano, bass guitar
- Dennis Budimir – guitars
- Alan Darby – guitars
- Eddie Martinez – guitars
- Saverio Porciello – guitars
- Steve Stevens – guitars
- Sneaky Pete Kleinow – pedal steel guitar
- Frank Blair – bass guitar
- Guy Pratt – bass guitar
- Dony Wynn – drums, percussion
- Cyro Baptista – percussion
- Pino Pischetola – percussion
- Claudio Pascoli – saxophone
- Chuck Findley – flugelhorn, trumpet
- Demo Morselli – trumpet
- Luka Belak – violin
- Clare Fischer – clarinet, string and horn arrangements, conductor
- Gerald Vinci – concertmaster
- B.J. Nelson – backing vocals (2–4)
- Pamela Starks – backing vocals (9)
- UB40 – backing vocals (9)

=== Production ===
- David Harper – executive producer
- Robert Palmer – producer (1–6, 9, 10, 17), co-producer (7, 8, 11, 13)
- Teo Macero – producer (7, 8, 11–16, 18)
- Arne Frager – engineer
- Pino Pischetola – engineer
- Mike Fraser – mixing (1, 5)
- Eric "ET" Thorngren – mixing (2–4, 6–18)
- Richard Cobble – production coordination
- Henry Marquez – art direction, design
- Timothy Greenfield-Sanders – photography
- David King – stylist

== Charts ==
=== Weekly charts ===
Chart (1990–1991)	Peak position
Australian Albums (ARIA)	29
Austrian Albums (Ö3 Austria)	17
Canadian Albums (RPM)	28
Dutch Albums (Album Top 100)	85
German Albums (Offizielle Top 100)	40
New Zealand Albums (RMNZ)	48
Swedish Albums (Sverigetopplistan)	48
UK Albums (Official Charts)	9
US Billboard 200	88

=== Year-end charts ===
Chart (1991)	Position
German Albums (Offizielle Top 100)	99

== Certifications ==
Region	Certification	Certified units/sales
Australia (ARIA)	Gold	35,000^{^}
^{^} Shipments figures based on certification alone.
