= 77 (Billy Idol song) =

Single by Billy Idol featuring Avril Lavigne

from the album Dream Into It
- B-side: "Still Dancing"
- Released: 22 April 2025
- Genre: Pop-punk; pop; punk rock
- Length: 2:54
- Label: BFI
- Songwriters: Billy Idol; Steve Stevens; Tommy English; Nick Long
- Producer: Tommy English

Billy Idol singles chronology
"Still Dancing" (2025)	"77" (2025)

Avril Lavigne singles chronology
"Can You Die from a Broken Heart" (2024)	"77" (2025)	"Young & Dumb" (2025)

"77" is a song by the English rock singer Billy Idol featuring Canadian pop-punk musician Avril Lavigne, released in 2025 as the second single from his ninth studio album, Dream Into It. The two performed the song on the 28 April episode of ABC's Jimmy Kimmel Live!

== Composition and lyrics ==
"77", a duet with Avril Lavigne, sounding more like one of her songs than Idol's, was described as a "textbook, Disney Channel pop-punk banger" by Blabbermouth.net, and a "hooky pop" song by Ultimate Classic Rock. Critics have noted the song merges the raw punk energy emblematic of Billy Idol’s 1970s roots with the catchy, mall-punk sensibility that defined Lavigne’s early 2000s style.

1977 is a famous year for punk and of significance for Idol, because he was part of the Bromley Contingent, a group of fans that followed the Sex Pistols around from show to show. He was also the frontman of punk rock band Generation X, but they wouldn’t release their self-titled debut until the next year. Idol, in a video posted on his social media page, explains to Lavigne the circumstances that led to punk rock. Both the USA and UK were in depressions at the time, so societal outcasts expressed themselves in the form of music. He then explained to Lavigne that he considered the song’s middle part to be "a reflection on both of us", noting, "I could join together ... what we felt like in the past with the people today. It’s not so different."

== Track listing ==
- Digital download and streaming
1. "77" (featuring Avril Lavigne) – 2:53
2. "Still Dancing" – 3:43
- 12" picture disc vinyl
1. "77" (featuring Avril Lavigne) – 2:53
2. "77" (original version) – 2:54

== Personnel ==
Credits adapted from Tidal.

- Billy Idol – lead vocals, backing vocals
- Tommy English – backing vocals, guitar, keyboards, synthesizer
- Chris Chaney – bass
- Steve Stevens – guitar
- Josh Freese – drums
- Avril Lavigne – featured vocals

== Charts ==
Chart performance for "77"
Chart (2025)	Peak position
UK Physical Singles (OCC)	24
US Adult Pop Airplay (Billboard)	19

== Release history ==
"77" release history
Region	Date	Format(s)	Label(s)	Ref.
Various	22 April 2025	Digital download; streaming	BFI	
United States	6 May 2025	Adult contemporary radio; hot adult contemporary radio	Dark Horse; BMG	
United States	7 May 2025	Contemporary hit radio	Dark Horse; BMG	
Various	28 November 2025	12" picture disc vinyl	Dark Horse; BMG	
