= I'll Be Your Baby Tonight =

1967 song by Bob Dylan

Song by Bob Dylan

from the album John Wesley Harding
- Released: December 27, 1967
- Recorded: November 29, 1967
- Studio: Columbia Studio A (Nashville, Tennessee)
- Genre: Country
- Length: 2:34
- Label: Columbia
- Songwriter: Bob Dylan
- Producer: Bob Johnston

"I'll Be Your Baby Tonight" is a 1967 song by Bob Dylan first released on John Wesley Harding. It features Pete Drake on pedal steel guitar, and two other Nashville musicians, Charlie McCoy on bass guitar and Kenneth Buttrey on drums, both of whom had appeared on Dylan's previous album, Blonde on Blonde.

Dylan first performed the song in concert at the Isle of Wight Festival with the Band on August 31, 1969. Since then, he has included it in more than 650 live performances. "I'll Be Your Baby Tonight" has been covered by various artists, including Robert Palmer with UB40 in 1990, and Norah Jones in 2003.

== The Rock Machine Turns You On ==
Dylan's I'll Be Your Baby Tonight was the first track on the 1968 CBS budget sampler album The Rock Machine Turns You On which, in the aftermath of the 1960s British dominance of pop music, was a successful marketing exercise in introducing the UK audience to contemporary USA pop output.

== Robert Palmer and UB40 version ==
"I'll Be Your Baby Tonight"

Single by Robert Palmer and UB40

from the album Don't Explain
- B-side: "Deep End"
- Released: October 22, 1990
- Genre: Reggae
- Length: 3:26
- Label: EMI
- Songwriter: Bob Dylan
- Producer: Robert Palmer

Robert Palmer singles chronology
"Life in Detail" (1990)	"I'll Be Your Baby Tonight" (1990)	"You're Amazing" (1990)

UB40 singles chronology
"The Way You Do the Things You Do" (1990)	"I'll Be Your Baby Tonight" (1990)	"Impossible Love" (1991)

Audio video
- "I'll Be Your Baby Tonight" on YouTube

In 1990, English singer and songwriter Robert Palmer and English reggae band UB40 released a cover version of the song. It was released as a single by EMI Records in the United Kingdom and throughout Europe. It appears on Robert Palmer's albums Don't Explain and on the 1995 best of The Very Best of. The song reached the top 10 in Australia, Austria, the Netherlands and Switzerland, and it also secured a number-six placing in both the United Kingdom and Ireland. In New Zealand, it reached number one for a week in February 1991.

=== Critical reception ===
David Giles of Music Week described the Robert Palmer and UB40 cover version as having "a dainty reggae beat", but deemed this "uninspiring pop... never really goes anywhere" and that success would depend on the music video.

=== Track listings ===
- 7-inch single
1. "I'll Be Your Baby Tonight" – 3:26
2. "Deep End" – 4:33
- CD single
1. "I'll Be Your Baby Tonight" – 3:26
2. "Deep End" – 4:33
- CD maxi
1. "I'll Be Your Baby Tonight" – 3:30
2. "I'll Be Your Baby Tonight" (extended version) – 7:25
3. "Deep End" – 4:33
- 12-inch single
1. "I'll Be Your Baby Tonight" (extended version) – 7:25
2. "I'll Be Your Baby Tonight" – 3:30
3. "Deep End" – 4:33

=== Charts ===
==== Weekly charts ====
Chart (1990–1991)	Peak position
Australia (ARIA)	4
Austria (Ö3 Austria Top 40)	5
Belgium (Ultratop 50 Flanders)	12
Canada Top Singles (RPM)	58
Europe (Eurochart Hot 100)	21
Europe (European Hit Radio)	2
France (SNEP)	25
Germany (GfK)	14
Ireland (IRMA)	6
Luxembourg (Radio Luxembourg)	5
Netherlands (Dutch Top 40)	5
Netherlands (Single Top 100)	4
New Zealand (Recorded Music NZ)	1
Sweden (Sverigetopplistan)	11
Switzerland (Schweizer Hitparade)	5
UK Singles (Official Charts)	6
UK Airplay (Music Week)	1
US Alternative Airplay (Billboard)	24

==== Year-end charts ====
Chart (1990)	Position
Netherlands (Single Top 100)	87

Chart (1991)	Position
Australia (ARIA)	69
Austria (Ö3 Austria Top 40)	26
Europe (Eurochart Hot 100)	60
Europe (European Hit Radio)	29
Germany (Media Control)	48
New Zealand (RIANZ)	40
Sweden (Topplistan)	78
Switzerland (Schweizer Hitparade)	14

=== Release history ===
Region	Date	Format(s)	Label	Ref.
United Kingdom	October 22, 1990	7-inch vinyl; 12-inch vinyl; CD; cassette	EMI	
Australia	November 26, 1990	Cassette	EMI	
Australia	December 17, 1990	12-inch vinyl	EMI	

== Certifications ==
Region	Certification	Certified units/sales
New Zealand (RMNZ)	Gold	15,000^{‡}
^{‡} Sales+streaming figures based on certification alone.

== See also ==
- List of European number-one airplay songs of the 1990s
