= Ella Vos =

American musician

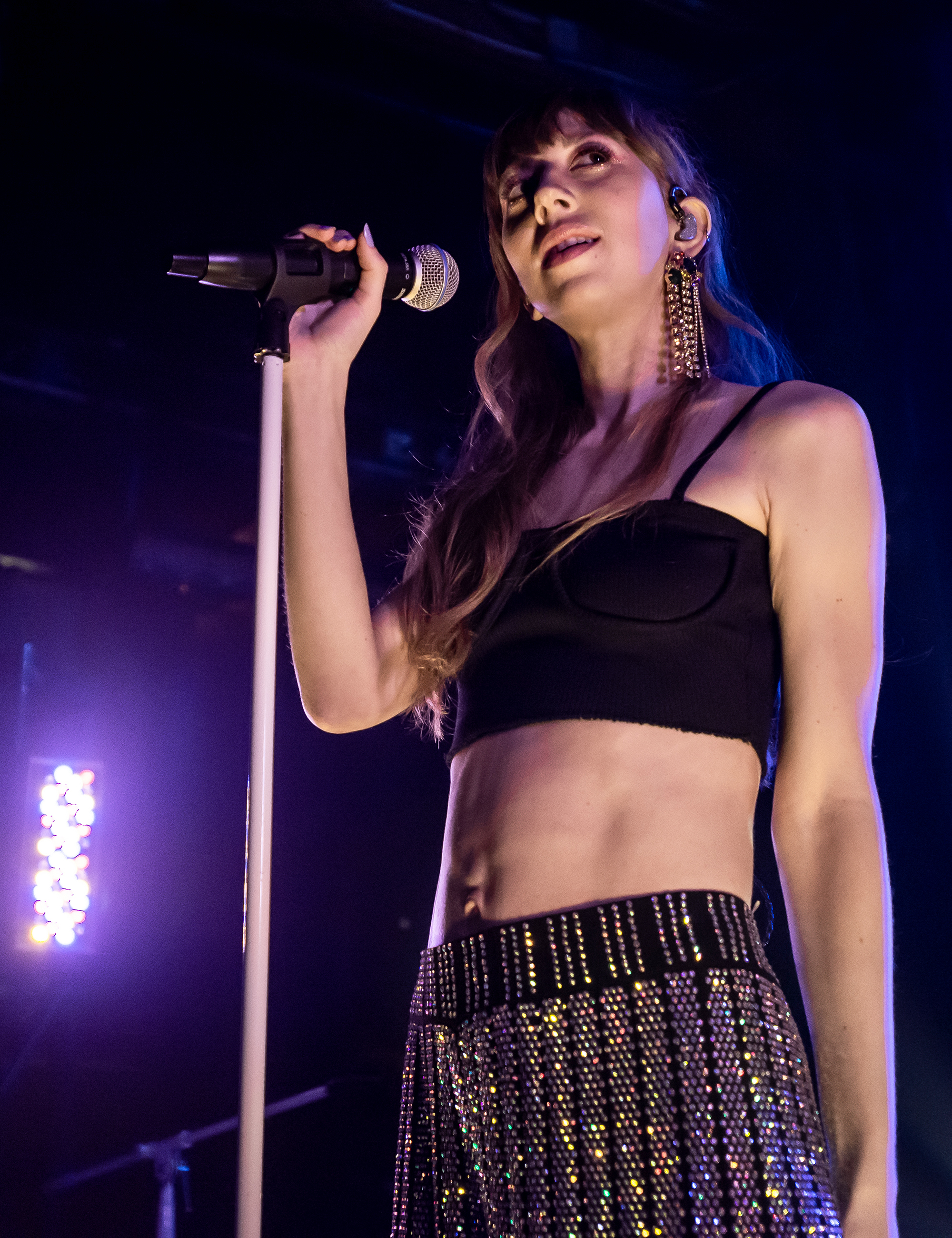

Background information
- Born: Lauren Salamone
- Genres: Indie rock, indie pop, synth-pop
- Occupation: Singer-songwriter
- Instruments: Vocals; piano; keyboards
- Years active: 2016–present
- Formerly of: BØRNS
- Website: ellavos.com

Ella Vos (born Lauren Salamone) is an American pop singer-songwriter based in Los Angeles.

== Career ==
A classically trained pianist, Vos worked as a keyboardist for BØRNS before deciding to pursue a career as a singer-songwriter after the birth of her son in 2015. She first gained attention as a vocalist on the 2016 EDM track "Rolling Dice" by Just a Gent.

Her first solo single, "White Noise", a song about being a new mother, was released in October 2016. Rolling Stone described it as "a seductive, gauzy, downtempo offering." The Boston Globe called her single "You Don't Know About Me" "one of the most highly charged sociopolitical songs of 2017." In 2018, she teamed with Icona Pop, VÉRITÉ, and Mija to remix "You Don't Know About Me" in support of the ACLU. Her debut album Words I Never Said was released on November 17, 2017.

In 2017 she toured the US, and performed at the Bonnaroo Music Festival. In February 2018 she embarked on the North American Words I Never Said Tour, with Freya Ridings.

In 2018 she was named a Vevo dscvr Artist to Watch. Her stage name means "she you" in Spanish.

Her five-song EP Watch & Wait was released on January 25, 2019.

In 2025, she launched the independent label Superglue Records in partnership with producer/songwriter Tommy English. Their debut signing is Dutch indie-pop artist Mia Nicolai.

== Discography ==
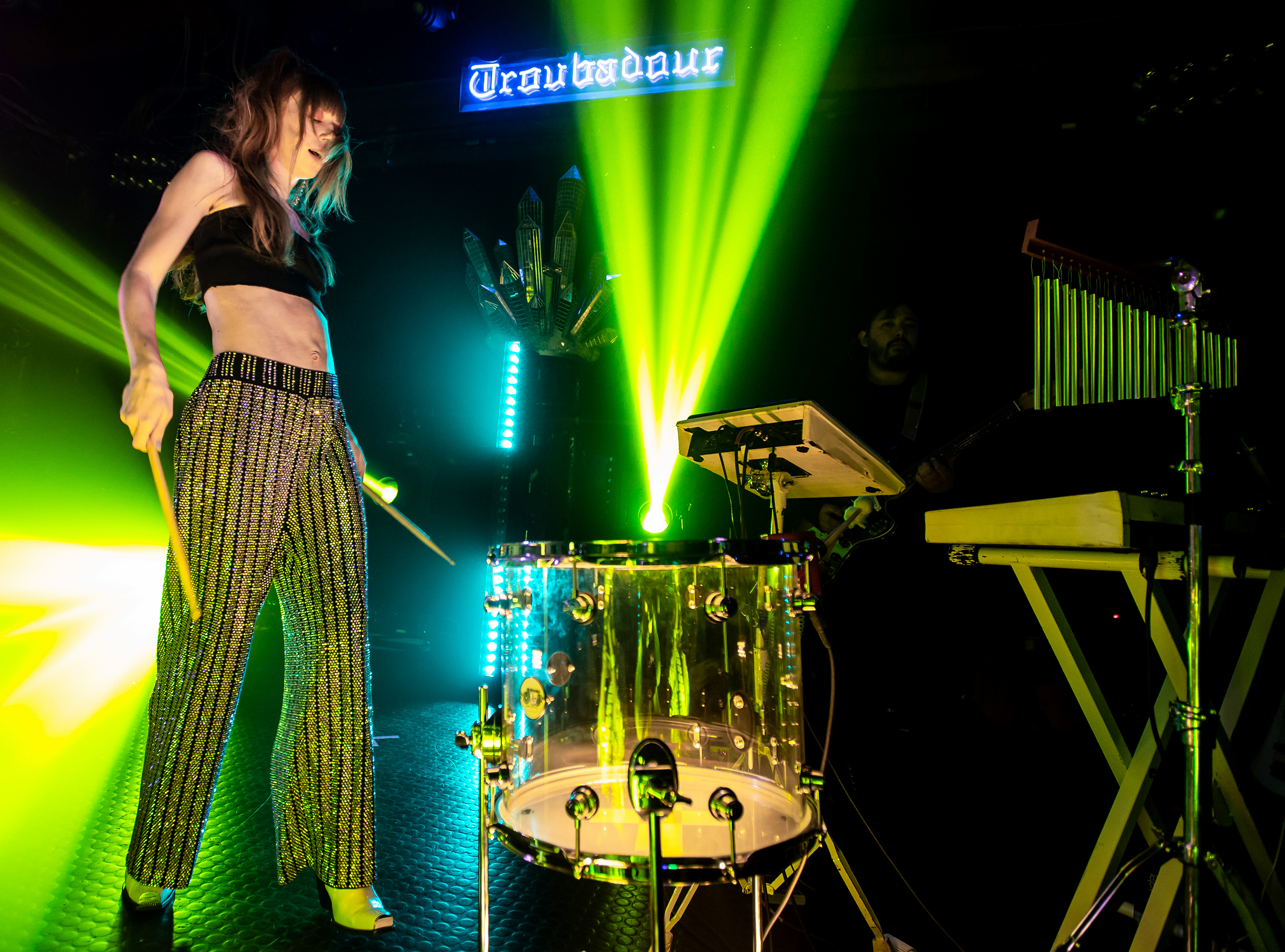
Ella Vos performing at The Troubadour in Los Angeles in 2018

=== Albums ===
- Words I Never Said (November 17, 2017)
- Turbulence (July 31, 2020)
- SUPERGLUE (March 3, 2023)
- "ROSEBUDS" (May 23, 2025)

=== Extended plays ===
- Watch & Wait (January 25, 2019)

=== Singles ===
- "White Noise" (2016)
- "You Don't Know About Me" (2017)
- "Thank God It's Christmas" (2017)
- "Cast Away" (2018)
- "Ocean" (2018)
- "Temporary" (2019)
- "Turbulence" (2020)
- "The Way I Am" (with Gavin Haley) (2020)

=== Appearances ===
- "Rolling Dice" – Just a Gent with Ella Vos and Joey Chavez (on the album Stories to Tell, 2016)
- "Exhale" – R3HAB with Ella Vos
- "Miles to Go" – Kaskade with Ella Vos
