= The Roadside =

EP by Billy Idol
- Released: 17 September 2021
- Recorded: September 2017 – August 2021
- Genre: Rock
- Length: 15:58
- Label: Dark Horse
- Producer: Butch Walker

Billy Idol chronology
Vital Idol: Revitalized (2018)	The Roadside (2021)	The Cage (2022)

The Roadside is an extended play (EP) by the English rock singer Billy Idol, his first release on George Harrison's Dark Horse Records. It is Idol's second EP long after Don't Stop in 1981, and his first release of new material since his 2014 album Kings & Queens of the Underground. It was produced by Butch Walker and released on September 17, 2021. The EP's songs all feature Idol's longtime collaborator, guitarist Steve Stevens.

The lead single, "Bitter Taste", references Idol's 1990 motorcycle crash, which nearly cost him his leg. Idol told American Songwriter: "I've never really written a song reflecting back on the motorcycle accident because I couldn't wait for it to be 20 years later, and now it's 31 years. I don't know about everybody else but for me personally, you have to let things marinate, and you never know how long that gestation period is going to last. The motorcycle accident is something I had 30 years to marinate and think about that."

== Reception ==
Upon release, The Roadside received positive reviews from critics. Louder Sound's Dom Lawson noted, "Judging by his Instagram feed, Billy Idol is the coolest grandad on the planet. Perhaps surprisingly, The Roadside EP is every bit as cool and continues to the unexpected good form that the Rebel Yell legend displayed on his last two studio records." William Degenaro of Pop Matters said, "The Roadside bodes well for his future... 'Bitter Taste' could very well prove to be one of Idol's definitive creations."

== Track listing ==
No.	Title	Writer(s)	Length
1.	"Rita Hayworth"	Billy Idol, Steve Stevens, Sam Hollander, Grant Michaels	3:05
2.	"Bitter Taste"	Idol, Stevens, Tommy English, Joe Janiak	4:26
3.	"U Don’t Have to Kiss Me Like That"	Idol, Stevens, Butch Walker	4:33
4.	"Baby Put Your Clothes Back On"	Idol, Stevens, Walker	3:54

== Personnel ==
- Billy Idol – vocals
- Zelma Davis – background vocals
- Blair Sinta – drums
- Steve Stevens – guitar
- Butch Walker – bass, drums, guitar, keyboards, percussion, programming, background vocals
