= Josie Stevens =

American fashion designer

- Born: September 24, 1981 (age 44); Chicago, Illinois
- Occupation(s): Model, stylist, TV personality, fashion designer, interior designer, makeup artist
- Modeling information
- Height: 5 ft 5 in (1.65 m)
- Hair color: Blonde
- Eye color: Blue

Josie Stevens (born September 24, 1981) is an American model, stylist, reality TV personality, host and fashion designer married to rock guitarist Steve Stevens. She starred in the 2010 reality TV show Married to Rock alongside her husband and others.

Chicago-born Josie has been on numerous magazine covers, and has posed for Playboy, sat for a variety of "stylist-up" artists and modeled for video game characters.

She has a successful career as a celebrity fashion stylist and hair and make-up artist, working on Cinemax film projects, commercials, TV shows and album covers. Some of her current and previous clients include husband Steve Stevens, Deadland Ritual, Duff Mckagen's Loaded, In this Moment, Opiate for the Masses, Blessed by a Broken Heart, photographer Hristo Shindov, Playboy Playmates and Showtime/Cinemax.

Josie married famed guitarist Steve Stevens in December 2008, after six years of dating, and manages Steve's career, as well as doing hair, make-up and wardrobe for all of his tours and appearances and designing his line of merchandise.

Josie has a popular line of clothing, costumes, lingerie and rave wear, "Josie Loves J Valentine", which has proved to be a celebrity favorite worn by stars such as Nicki Minaj, Kylie and Kendall Jenner, Paris Hilton, Bella Thorne, Alessandra Ambrosio, Gwen Stefani, Miley Cyrus, Fergie, Raja Gemini, Laura Croft, Jenna Jameson, and Bridget Marquardt.

Josie Loves J Valentine was released in 2011, with a launch party September 7 where an all-star band performed (including her husband and Billy Idol) and a variety of Reality Stars, Musicians and Playmates walked in her fashion show.

In 2012, she expanded her brand with a line of sleepwear with the world’s most popular footed pajama company, Jumpin Jammerz.

In 2016, Josie expanded her design portfolio to include interior design. Most notably, she designed the West Hollywood offices of celebrity plastic surgeon Dr Dean Manus. LA Weekly magazine declared the interior design to be "the hippest doctors office" in their "Best of LA Culture: Services with Something Special" Top 10 list on March 26, 2019.
