= Black Light Syndrome =

Studio album by Bozzio Levin Stevens
- Released: July 15, 1997
- Recorded: January 27–30, 1997
- Studio: Clear Lake Audio, North Hollywood
- Genre: Instrumental rock, jazz fusion
- Length: 67:00
- Label: Magna Carta
- Producer: Terry Bozzio, Tony Levin, Steve Stevens

Bozzio Levin Stevens chronology
Black Light Syndrome (1997)	Situation Dangerous (2000)

Professional ratings
Review scores
Source	Rating
AllMusic	4/5 stars

Black Light Syndrome is the first studio album by the supergroup Bozzio Levin Stevens, released on July 15, 1997 through Magna Carta Records. The trio consists of drummer Terry Bozzio, bassist Tony Levin and guitarist Steve Stevens, all known for their work in jazz, rock and other styles. Black Light Syndrome consists of seven original instrumentals, largely improvised in the studio.

== Track listing ==
All tracks are written by Terry Bozzio, Tony Levin and Steve Stevens.

No.	Title	Length
1.	"The Sun Road"	14:39
2.	"Dark Corners"	8:32
3.	"Duende"	7:26
4.	"Black Light Syndrome"	8:45
5.	"Falling in Circles"	9:08
6.	"Book of Hours"	9:42
7.	"Chaos/Control"	8:48
Total length:		67:00

== Personnel ==
- Steve Stevens – guitar, pedals, production
- Tony Levin – Chapman stick, bass guitar, production
- Terry Bozzio – drums, percussion, production
- Wyn Davis – engineering, mixing, production
- Todd Langner – mixing
