= Welcome to the Wasteland (Bad City album) =

Studio album by Bad City
- Released: August 22, 2010
- Recorded: 2010
- Genre: Glam metal
- Length: 39:04 (45:46 Deluxe Version)
- Label: Atlantic Records
- Producer: Johnny K

Welcome to the Wasteland is the only studio album by Chicago rock band Bad City.

== Track listing ==
All songs were composed by guitarists Tom Schleiter and Max Perenchio.

1. "Showdown in Central Park" - 4:40
2. "Take Me For A Ride" - 3:43
3. "Do You Believe In Rock N Roll" - 3:44
4. "Wildlife" - 4:17
5. "Fire In The Pouring Rain" - 3:56
6. "Call Paul Stanley" - 4:38
7. "Heatwave" - 3:34
8. "Look Out!" - 4:55
9. "Touch" - 3:36
10. "Straight To The Grave" - 4:01
11. "Don't Stop" (Japanese Bonus Track) - 3:48
12. "War on Love" (Japanese Bonus Track) - 3:34

== Charts ==
Chart (2010)	Peak position
U.S. Billboard 200	182
U.S. Heatseekers Albums	4
U.S. Hard Rock Albums	22

== Reviews ==
Professional ratings
Review scores
Source	Rating
Allmusic	3/5 stars

Paul Stanley from Kiss is quoted as saying: ""Welcome To The Wasteland" is an absolute knockout and the best album I've heard in ages. A killer, cohesive album of great rock and bombastic production that has been sorely missing. Every track is a winner and Bad City raises the bar out of most band's reach. It's really that good."
