= Situation Dangerous =

Studio album by Bozzio Levin Stevens
- Released: August 8, 2000
- Recorded: Stagg Street Studios, Los Angeles; The Purple Room, West Hollywood
- Genre: Instrumental rock, jazz fusion, Progressive rock
- Length: 48:13
- Label: Magna Carta
- Producer: Terry Bozzio, Tony Levin, Steve Stevens, R. Chris Murphy

Bozzio Levin Stevens chronology
Black Light Syndrome (1997)	Situation Dangerous (2000)

Professional ratings
Review scores
Source	Rating
AllMusic	4/5 stars

Situation Dangerous is the second studio album by the supergroup Bozzio Levin Stevens, featuring drummer Terry Bozzio, bassist Tony Levin and guitarist Steve Stevens. It was released on August 8, 2000 by Magna Carta Records.

== Track listing ==
All tracks are written by Terry Bozzio, Tony Levin and Steve Stevens.

No.	Title	Length
1.	"Dangerous"	6:40
2.	"Endless"	10:10
3.	"Crash"	5:08
4.	"Spiral"	4:37
5.	"Melt"	3:48
6.	"Tragic"	6:58
7.	"Tziganne"	4:27
8.	"Lost"	6:24
Total length:		48:13

== Personnel ==
- Steve Stevens – guitars, engineering, production
- Tony Levin – Chapman stick, bass guitar, production
- Terry Bozzio – drums, percussion, production
- Marcus Nand – acoustic guitar (track 7)
- R. Chris Murphy – engineering, production
- Annette Cisneros – engineering
- Erich Gobel – engineering
- David Townson – digital editing
- Terry Brown – mixing
- Ken Lee – mastering
