= Tommy English (producer) =

American songwriter and producer

- Born: Thomas James Schleiter; May 8, 1986 (age 40)
- Origin: Chicago, Illinois, U.S.
- Genres: Indie pop; alternative rock
- Occupations: Songwriter; record producer
- Formerly of: Bad City; Powerspace

Thomas James Schleiter (born May 8, 1986), professionally known as Tommy English, is a multi-platinum songwriter and record producer best known for his work with BØRNS including the platinum-certified hit single "Electric Love", co-writing Kacey Musgraves' platinum single "High Horse" and 2024 song "Sway", as well as work with K.Flay, Noah Cyrus, COIN, Ricky Montgomery, and others.

In 2018, he was nominated for his first Grammy Award for his contributions to the album Every Where Is Some Where by K.Flay. He also saw Recording Academy nods for his work on Kacey Musgraves' 2018 Album Of The Year and Best Country Album Golden Hour, as well as in 2024 for the Best Country Album-nominated Deeper Well.

== Career ==
Growing up in the northwest suburbs of Chicago, English spent most of his youth playing soccer, writing songs and learning how to play instruments such as the piano, trumpet, drums and guitar. His parents stressed music education for which he is very thankful. English mainly works out of PWZ Custom Recordings, his music studios in Los Angeles, California, and Nashville, Tennessee.

English began his career as a musician at the age of 19 when his band Powerspace signed to Fueled By Ramen. He was also lead guitarist for the band Bad City. Two years after graduating from Miami University, English decided to explore a solo career as a producer and songwriter. He moved back to Chicago where he focused on engineering and music production. After gaining these skills he moved to Los Angeles where he began working in sound engineering.

In 2025, he launched the independent label Superglue Records in partnership with artist/producer Ella Vos. Their debut signing is Dutch indie-pop artist Mia Nicolai.

== Select works ==
Year	Artist	Credit	Title
2026	K.Flay	Producer	"Ants"
2026	Jonas Brothers	Songwriter	"Listen When Sad"
2026	Isabel LaRosa	Producer/writer	"Hallucination"
2026	Nick Jonas	Producer/writer	"Handprints"
2026	Nick Jonas	Producer/writer	"You Got Me"
2026	Nick Jonas	Producer/writer	"Seeing Ghosts"
2026	Nick Jonas	Producer/writer	"911"
2026	Nick Jonas	Producer	"London Foolishly"
2025	Omar Rudberg	Producer/writer	"Dying"
2025	Jonas Brothers	Producer/writer	"Heat Of The Moment"
2025	Jonas Brothers	Producer/writer	"Bully"
2025	grentperez	Producer/writer	"Might Not Be"
2025	Vundabar	Producer/writer	"Big Bad Bubble Boy"
2025	Joe Jonas	Producer/writer	"Honey Blonde"
2025	Joe Jonas	Producer/writer	"Sip Your Wine" ft. Sierra Ferrell
2025	Joe Jonas	Producer/writer	"My Own Best Friend"
2025	Joe Jonas	Producer/writer	"You Got The Right"
2025	Rascal Flatts, Jonas Brothers	Producer/writer	"I Dare You"
2025	Billy Idol, Avril Lavigne	Producer/writer	"77"
2025	Billy Idol	Producer/writer	Dream Into It
2025	Dean Lewis	Producer/writer	"With You"
2025	sapientdream, slushii, The Chainsmokers	Songwriter	"Past Lives (The Chainsmokers Remix)"
2025	Bishop Briggs	Songwriter	"Lightning"
2025	Tei Shi	Producer/writer	Make believe I make believe
2024	Blink-182	Producer/writer	"If You Never Left"
2024	Kacey Musgraves	Songwriter	"Sway"
2024	Kacey Musgraves	Songwriter	"Little Sister"
2024	Joshua Bassett	Producer/Writer	The Golden Years
2024	Ricky Montgomery	Producer/Writer	Rick(y)
2024	Yot Club	Producer/Writer	"Pixel"
2024	SHAED	Producer/Writer	"Everybody Knows I'm High"
2023	Joshua Bassett	Producer	"Just Love"
2023	Ricky Montgomery	Producer/Writer	Rick
2023	Andrew McMahon in the Wilderness	Producer/Writer	Tilt at the Wind No More
2023	sapientdream, slushii	Songwriter	"Past Lives"
2022	Noah Cyrus	Producer/Writer	"Ready To Go"
2022	Noah Cyrus	Producer/Writer	"I Just Want A Lover"
2022	Billy Idol	Producer/Writer	The Cage EP
2022	Little Big Town	Producer/Writer	"Last Day On Earth"
2022	bülow	Producer/Writer	"booty call"
2022	G Flip	Producer/Writer	"Love Hurts"
2022	Lights (musician)	Producer/Writer	"In My Head"
2021	Walk The Moon	Producer/Writer	"Can You Handle My Love??"
2021	X Ambassadors	Producer/Writer	"Okay"
2021	Ricky Montgomery	Producer/Writer	"Sorry for Me"
2021	Billy Idol	Songwriter	"Bitter Taste"
2020	COIN	Producer/Writer	"Crash My Car"
2020	PVRIS	Producer/Writer	"Dead Weight"
2020	PVRIS	Producer/Writer	"Gimme a Minute"
2020	Adam Lambert	Producer/Writer	"Loverboy"
2020	Adam Lambert	Producer	"Love Dont"
2019	Fitz & The Tantrums	Producer/Writer	All The Feels
2019	K.Flay	Producer/Writer	Solutions
2019	Broods	Producer/Writer	Don't Feed the Pop Monster
2019	Carly Rae Jepsen	Producer/Writer	"The Sound"
2019	Foster The People	Producer/Writer	"Worst Nites"
2019	Adam Lambert	Producer/Writer	"Superpower"
2018	Kacey Musgraves	Songwriter	"High Horse"
2018	Dagny	Producer/Writer	"That Feeling When"
2018	The Knocks	Producer/Writer	New York Narcotic
2018	Poppy, Diplo	Producer/Writer	"Time Is Up"
2017	K. Flay	Producer/Writer	Every Where Is Some Where
2017	BØRNS	Producer/Writer	Blue Madonna
2017	Andrew McMahon in the Wilderness	Producer	Zombies on Broadway
2016	Ladyhawke	Producer/Writer	Wild Things
2016	Against the Current	Producer/Writer	In Our Bones
2016	Dagny	Producer/Writer	Ultraviolet EP
2016	Poppy	Producer/Writer	"Money"
2015	BØRNS	Producer/Writer	Dopamine
2014	Set It Off	Producer/Writer	"Ancient History"
2014	Set It Off, Jason Lancaster	Producer/Writer	"Tomorrow"
