= Grant Michaels (songwriter) =

American songwriter and producer

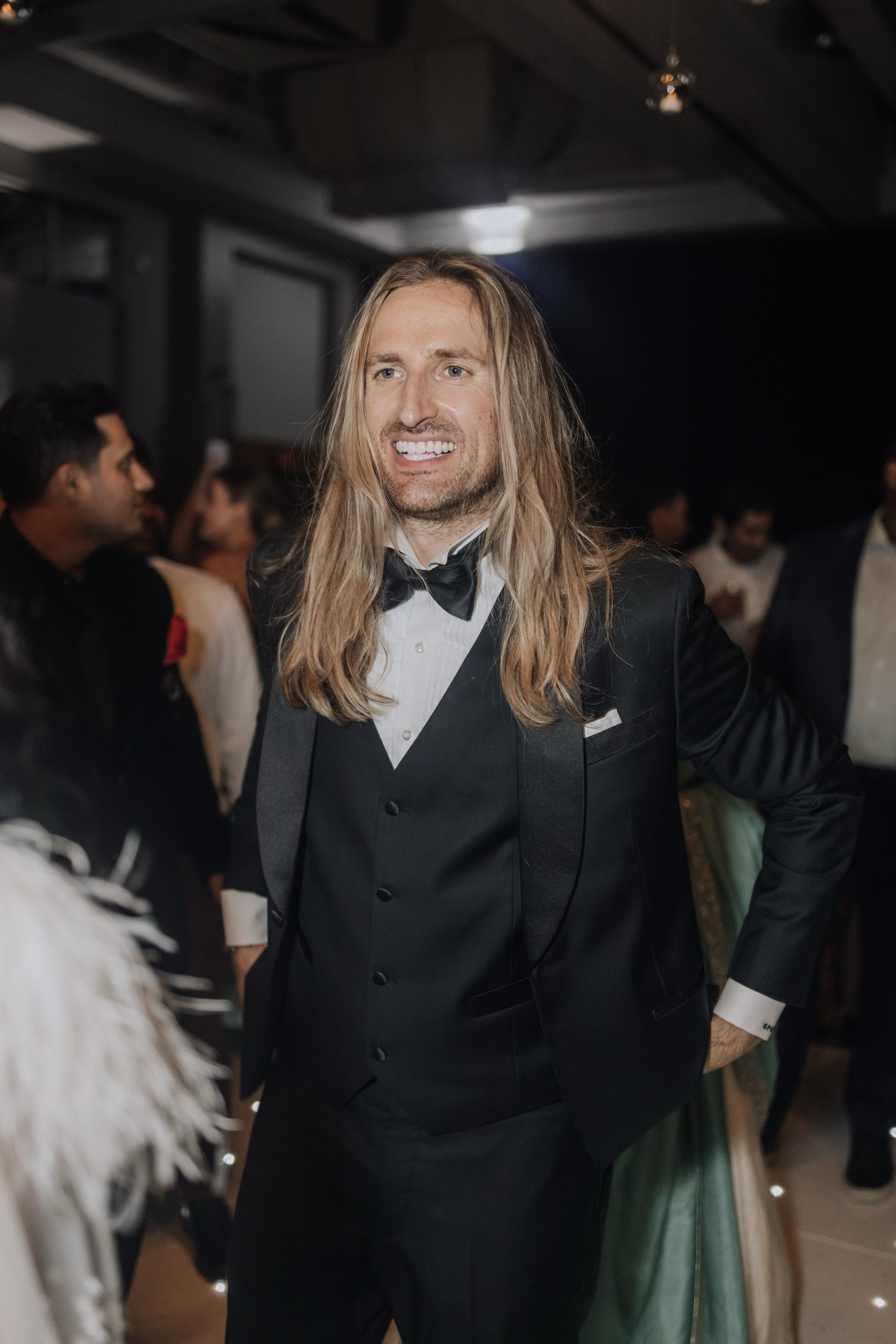

Background information
- Occupations: Songwriter; record producer
- Instruments: Keyboards; programming

Grant Michaels is an American songwriter and record producer. He has collaborated with Banners, Sia, Weezer, Ringo Starr, Fitz and the Tantrums, SZA, Billy Idol, American Authors, Goo Goo Dolls, Jewel, Andy Grammer, Hoodie Allen, Dove Cameron, Sofia Carson, Sugar Ray, Rob Thomas and Aloe Blacc.

== Career ==
In 2012 he co-wrote Hoodie Allen's platinum single "No Interruptions". In 2015 was credited on Sia's award-winning album 1000 Forms of Fear having co-written,"Dressed in Black".

Michaels has worked with collaborator Sam Hollander on multiple songs. In 2017 they co-wrote Banners' platinum selling single "Someone To You". Michaels also worked on multiple songs from the Disney movie, Descendants 2 (Original Soundtrack) including platinum-selling song, "Ways To Be Wicked".

== Awards and recognition ==
Sia's "Dressed in Back", which Michaels co-wrote with Sia and Greg Kurstin, appeared on 1000 Forms of Fear, which received a 2014 ARIA Award for Album of the Year.

== Selected discography ==
- Banners, "Someone to You" (Island) (writer)
- Oh Land, "Green Card", "Kill My Darling" (Tusk or Tooth, A:larm) (writer, producer)
- Sia, "Dressed in Black" (Interia, Monkey Puzzle, RCA) (writer)
- SZA, "Aftermath" (self released) (producer)
- Fitz and the Tantrums, "HandClap" (Elektra) (keyboards and drum programming)
- The Goo Goo Dolls, "Not Goodbye (Close My Eyes)"
- Aloe Blacc, "King Is Born"
- Saint Motel, "Preach"
- Billy Idol, "Rita Hayworth" (Dark Horse) (writer)
- Hoodie Allen, "No Interruption" (self released) (writer, producer)
- ILLENIUM, "You Were Right"
- Ringo Starr, "Teach Me to Tango" (Universal Music Enterprises) (writer)
- Weezer, "Records" (Atlantic, Crush) (writer)
