= Steve Stevens =

American guitarist (born 1959)

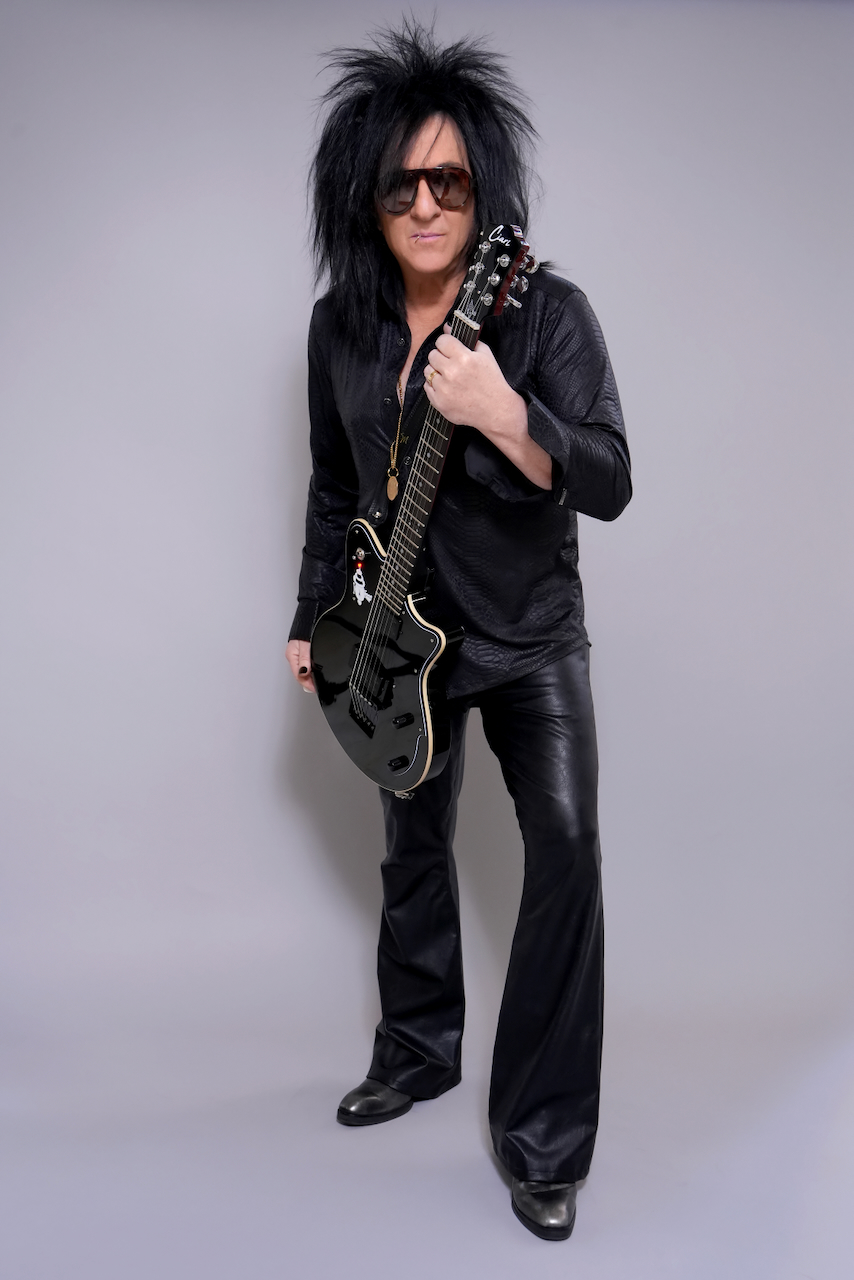
- Stevens in 2025

Background information
- Born: Steven Bruce Schneider; May 5, 1959 (age 67); New York City, U.S.
- Education: Fiorello H. LaGuardia High School of Music & Art and Performing Arts
- Genres: Hard rock; glam metal; heavy metal; instrumental rock; post-punk; new wave; power pop
- Occupations: Musician; songwriter; producer
- Instruments: Guitar; keyboards
- Years active: 1979–present
- Website: stevestevensguitar.com

Steve Stevens (born Steven Bruce Schneider; May 5, 1959) is an American guitarist. He is best known as Billy Idol's guitarist and songwriting collaborator, and for his lead guitar work on the theme to Top Gun – "Top Gun Anthem" – for which he won the Grammy for Best Pop Instrumental Performance in 1987.

Stevens has played for Michael Jackson, Ric Ocasek, Robert Palmer, Michael Monroe and many others. He was in Vince Neil's band from 1992 to 1994, touring and recording on his album Exposed and was a founding member of the supergroup Bozzio Levin Stevens, which released Black Light Syndrome in 1997 and Situation Dangerous in 2000. He played Spanish flamenco guitar on the song "Pistolero" (1999) for the trance group Juno Reactor. During 2012–2016, Stevens appeared with Kings of Chaos. His "Steve Stevens" group headlined the closing performance at the Musikmesse in Frankfurt, Germany, in April 2016. He is also a television personality on the E! show Married to Rock, alongside his wife, Josie Stevens.

In 2025, Stevens was nominated for induction to the Rock and Roll Hall of Fame alongside Idol, and later inducted with him in 2026.

== Early life ==
Steven Bruce Schneider was born on May 5, 1959 in New York City and grew up in Queens. Schneider began playing guitar at the age of 7 after being inspired by local folk musician Phil Ochs. He got his first serious guitar at the age of 8 which was a nylon-string, he didn’t get his first electric guitar until he was 13. He later attended Fiorello H. LaGuardia High School of Music & Art and Performing Arts, during this period he would get into classical guitar and was influenced by Steve Howe and Robert Fripp. Throughout his upbringing he also had a big interest in Flamenco music.

== Career ==
=== Billy Idol ===
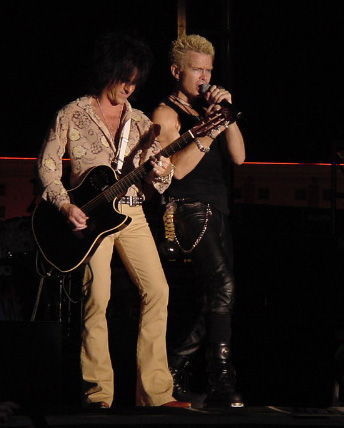
Stevens (left) and Billy Idol in 2003

After attending Fiorello H. LaGuardia High School of Music & Art and Performing Arts for a few years Stevens decided to drop out of school and started making a name for himself in Manhattan playing with local bands. Following the dissolution of Generation X in 1981 Billy Idol moved to New York, City to start a solo career. Idol’s manager Bill Aucoin then introduced him to Stevens and the two hit it off immediately, with Idol later stating in a 2025 interview "Once I saw what Steve could do, I knew anything I wanted to do, I could do it. Then with Keith Forsey producing, I just knew we had this sort of triumvirate that ended up really fueling the Billy Idol of the '80s."

They would go on to release their debut album Billy Idol in 1982 along with the follow up Rebel Yell in 1983 and 1986s Whiplash Smile. These three initial albums Stevens worked on with Idol saw success and went on to become multi platinum in both the U.S. and Canada. However, he and Idol parted ways in 1988 as Stevens went on to record his first solo album and pursue other ventures.

In 2001, Stevens and Idol reunited and appeared together on MTV, playing an acoustic set on VH1 Storytellers. He and Idol then released Devil's Playground in 2005, which was their first album together in 18 years. Stevens has since collaborated with Idol on four more albums, the most recent being Dream Into It (2025). Stevens still tours regularly with Idol.

In 2026, Stevens and Idol were both inducted into the Rock and Roll Hall of Fame.

=== Solo career ===
His solo album releases include Atomic Playboys (1989), Flamenco a Go-Go (1999), and Memory Crash (2008).

=== Other collaborations and appearances ===
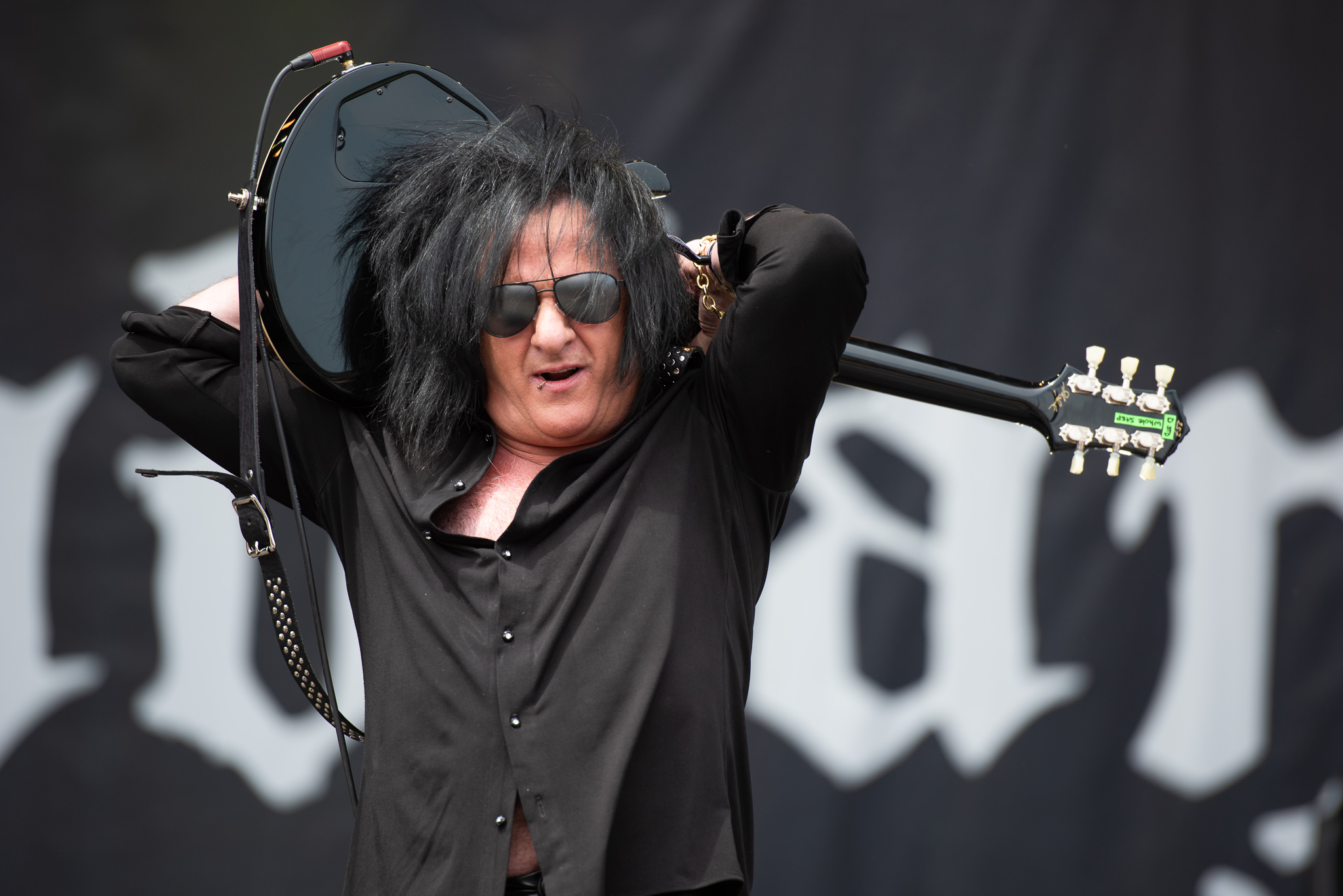
Stevens performing in 2019

Stevens first collaboration outside of Billy Idol was with Ric Ocasek, where he contributed to songs 1, 4, 5, 7, 9, 10 on his 1986 album This Side of Paradise. He played the guitar on Mötley Crüe vocalists Vince Neil’s 1993 debut solo album Exposed. Stevens also played on Japanese musician Kyosuke Himuro 1997 album I·De·A.

In 1986, Stevens worked alongside Harold Faltermeyer to create the song "Top Gun Anthem" for the 1986 film Top Gun. For his work on the song Stevens would win a Grammy Award for Best Pop Instrumental Performance at the 29th Annual Grammy Awards. Stevens has also contributed to other movie sound tracks such as Matrix Reloaded, Once Upon A Time In Mexico, Coyote Ugly, Look Who’s Talking Too, The Upside of Anger, Ace Ventura; Pet Detective and The Wedding Singer.

In 1990, Stevens recruited Greg Ellis, Michael Monroe and Sami Takamäki to form Jerusalem Slim. They released one self titled album in 1992.

In 1997, Stevens helped form the super group Bozzio Levin Stevens, alongside Terry Bozzio of Frank Zappa, U.K., Missing Persons, Steve Vai, Jeff Beck), and Tony Levin of Peter Gabriel, King Crimson and Liquid Tension Experiment. They released two albums Black Light Syndrome in 1997 and Situation Dangerous in 2000.

In 2018, Stevens helped form another super group called Deadland Ritual. Alongside Franky Perez (Apocalyptica), Geezer Butler (Black Sabbath) and drummer Matt Sorum(the Cult, Guns N' Roses). The group released two singles together before disbanding.

In 2022, Stevens teamed up with The String Revolution to cover Ozzy Osbourne's "Crazy Train" in a Flamenco style.In 2024 Stevens along with Ozzy Osbourne featured on the Billy Morrison "Crack Cocaine." The song went on to reach number 2 on the U.S. Mainstream Rock chart.

== Gear ==
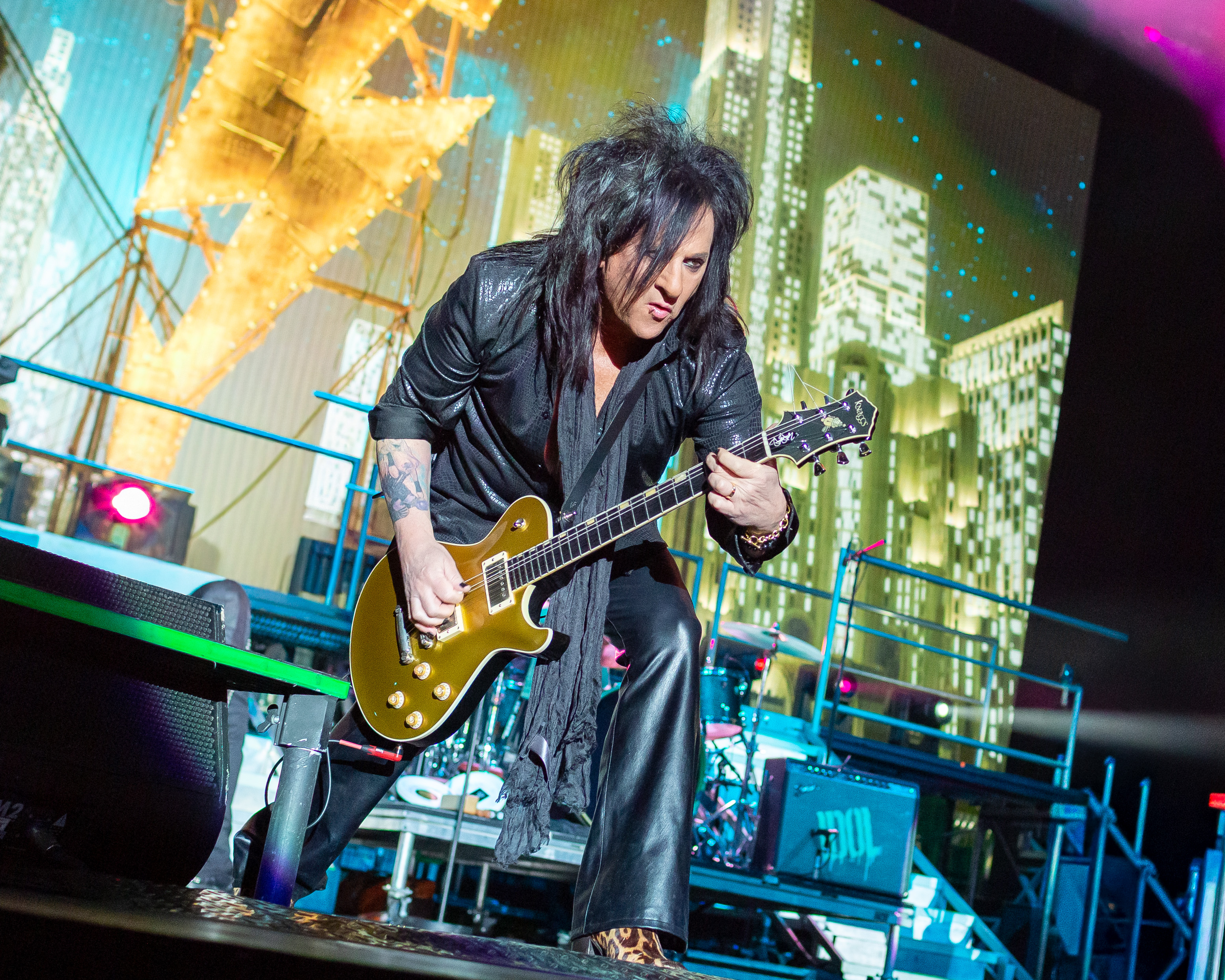
Stevens in 2022

Stevens has his own line of Knaggs series guitars, and in May of 2025, he partnered with Ciari to release another set of signature series guitars.

For amps, Stevens relies on his signature Friedman head, a two-channel design powered by EL34 tubes. One channel draws inspiration from his 1969 Marshall Plexi, while the other is tailored to deliver a response similar to a Fender Twin Reverb. He also uses the very first prototype of this signature model. When he needs especially clean tones, he switches to a pair of Custom Audio Amplifiers PT100 heads, keeping one as a backup.

When it comes to effects, he runs everything through a large, rack-mounted system. It features switching units from Egnater and Axess, along with processors like the Line 6 Mod Pro and Echo Pro, a TC Electronic D-Two, and an Eventide H7600 Ultra-Harmonizer. The setup also includes a few drawers filled with pedals from brands such as Moog, Source Audio, MXR, Joemeek, and Boss.

== Personal life ==
Steve Stevens has been married to Josie Stevens, a model, stylist, and television personality, since December 2008. In 2010 he and his wife appeared in the 10 episode reality documentary television series on E! titled Married to Rock.

== Discography ==
=== Solo ===
Studio albums

- Atomic Playboys (1989)
- Flamenco a Go-Go (1999)
- Memory Crash (2008)

Promotional albums

- The Guitar World According to Steve Stevens (1986)
- Akai Guitar Sample Collection (1994)

=== Collaborations ===
with Billy Idol

- Billy Idol (1982)
- Rebel Yell (1983)
- Whiplash Smile (1986)
- Devil's Playground (2005)
- Kings & Queens of the Underground (2014)
- The Roadside (2021)
- The Cage (2022)
- Dream Into It (2025)

with Ric Ocasek

- This Side of Paradise (1986)

with Jerusalem Slim

- Jerusalem Slim (1992)

with Vince Neil

- Exposed (1993)

with Bozzio Levin Stevens

- Black Light Syndrome (1997)
- Situation Dangerous (2000)

with Kyosuke Himuro

- I·De·A (1997)
- The One Night Stands Live (1998)
- Mellow (2000)
- Beat Haze Odyssey (2000)
- Follow the Wind (2003)

with Deadland Ritual

- "Down in Flames" (2018)
- "Broken and Bruised" (2019)

As Featured Singles

Title	Year	Peak chart positions	Album
Title	Year	US Main.	Album
"Crack Cocaine" (Billy Morrison feat. Ozzy Osbourne and Steve Stevens)	2024	2	The Morrison Project

Guest appearances

Title	Release	Other artist(s)	Album
"First Day in the Rain"	1982	Peter Criss	Let Me Rock You
"Roll Over"	1985	Thompson Twins	Here's to Future Days
"Revolution"	1985	Thompson Twins	Here's to Future Days
"Breakaway"	1985	Thompson Twins	Here's to Future Days
"With You"	1987	Jill Jones	Jill Jones
"Dirty Diana"	1988	Michael Jackson	Bad
"Darkest Night of the Year"	1989	Steve Lukather	Lukather
"You're Amazing"	1990	Robert Palmer	Don't Explain
"Two Worlds"	1991	McQueen Street	McQueen Street
"Do You Hear What I Hear"	1998		Merry Axemas Vol. 2
"Train to Willoughby"	2000	Gregg Bissonette	Submarine
"NY Child"	2001	Adam Bomb	New York Times
"Cheyenne"	2001	Adam Bomb	New York Times
"Saluda a Lola"	2001	Adam Bomb	New York Times
"Anxiety"	2001	Adam Bomb	New York Times
"Alpha Burst"	2004	Derek Sherinian	Mythology
"El Flamingo Suave"	2004	Derek Sherinian	Mythology
"A View from the Sky"	2004	Derek Sherinian	Mythology
"Ghost Runner"	2011	Derek Sherinian	Oceana
"Oceana"	2011	Derek Sherinian	Oceana
"The Fallout"	2012	Neodymium Project	non-album single
"Jet Airliner"	2013	John Wetton, Billy Sherwood	Fly Like an Eagle – An All-Star Tribute to Steve Miller Band
"Sorry"	2014	Meg Myers	Sorry
"Push Away"	2014	Sebastian Bach	Give 'Em Hell
"Had Enough"	2014	Sebastian Bach	Give 'Em Hell
"Gun to a Knife Fight"	2014	Sebastian Bach	Give 'Em Hell
"I Will Always Be Yours"	2018	Ben Rector	Magic
"I Melt with You"	2019	David Hasselhoff	Open Your Eyes
"The Vortex"	2022	Derek Sherinian	Vortex
"Seven Seas"	2022	Derek Sherinian	Vortex
"Thoughtful Distress"	2023	Albert Hammond Jr.	Melodies On Hiatus
"F.U."	2024	Sebastian Bach	Child Within the Man

Soundtrack appearances

Title	Release	Other artist(s)	Soundtrack album
"Top Gun Anthem"	1986	Harold Faltermeyer	Top Gun
"Power of Suggestion"	1994	Perry McCarty	Ace Ventura: Pet Detective
"Speed"	1994	Billy Idol	Speed
"Top Gun Anthem" (re-recording)	2022	Harold Faltermeyer	Top Gun: Maverick

== Awards and nominations ==
Year	Grammy	Nominee / work	Category	Result
1987	Grammy Awards	"Top Gun Anthem"	Best Pop Instrumental Performance	Won
2025	Rock and Roll Hall of Fame	Himself	Hall of Fame	Nominated
2026	Rock and Roll Hall of Fame	Himself	Hall of Fame	Inducted
