= Post Saga =

American indie rock and pop band

Post Saga is an American indie rock and pop band from Northeast Ohio that combines elements of indie rock, pop, jazz and alternative styles. The group has been active in the regional music scene since the late 2010s and has released multiple recordings while performing throughout Ohio.

== History ==
Post Saga was formed in 2017 by frontwoman, vocalist and songwriter Danna O’Connor along with a group of musician friends in Northeast Ohio. Early coverage described the band as drawing from funk, pop, jazz and rock influences as they began writing and performing original material as well as covers.

"The name means 'post-story' and was inspired by O’Connor’s songwriting, which serves as a way to record her life experiences and share them with others after the fact."

== Live Performances ==
Post Saga performs regularly throughout Ohio and the surrounding region. They are active on the Northeast Ohio live music circuit and have played at venues including Beachland Tavern in Cleveland.

The band's shows have been noted for their energy and appeal across a variety of audiences, reflecting the group's diverse musical influences.

== Musical Style ==
Post Saga's music has been described by local press as drawing from a range of genres with arrangements that feature a mix of traditional rock instruments and horns.
