= List of rock instrumentals =

The following is a list of rock instrumentals. Only instrumentals that are notable are included.

== Instrumentals which have charted ==
Instrumental rock is rock music that emphasizes musical instruments and features very little or no singing. An instrumental is a musical composition or recording without lyrics, or singing, although it might include some inarticulate vocals, such as shouted backup vocals in a big band setting.

=== 1950s and 1960s chartings ===
Artist	Song title	Date	Highest position on US charts	Highest position on UK charts	Highest position on R&B charts	Miscellaneous
Bill Justis	"Raunchy"	1957	#3	#24	#1	
Ernie Freeman	"Raunchy"	1957	#4	#1		
The Champs	"Tequila"	1958	#1	#5	#1	
Duane Eddy	"Moovin' N' Groovin'"	1958	#72			
The Champs	"El Rancho Rock"	1958	#30			
Link Wray & His Ray Men	"Rumble"	1958	#16		#11	
Duane Eddy	"Rebel Rouser"	1958	#6	#8	#19	
Duane Eddy	"Ramrod"	1958	#28			
The Champs	"Chariot Rock"	1958	#59			
Duane Eddy	"Cannonball"	1958	#15	#2	#22	
Link Wray & His Ray Men	"Raw-Hide"	1959	#23			
The Rockin' R's	"The Beat"	1959	#57			
Duane Eddy	"Yep!"	1959	#30	#17		
The Virtues	"Guitar Boogie Shuffle"	1959	#5		#27	
Dave "Baby" Cortez	"The Happy Organ"	1959	#1		#5	
Johnny and the Hurricanes	"Crossfire"	1959	#23			
The Wailers	"Tall Cool One"	1959	#36		#24	
Preston Epps	"Bongo Rock"	1959	#14			
Duane Eddy	"Forty Miles of Bad Road"	1959	#9		#17	
Johnny and the Hurricanes	"Red River Rock"	1959	#5	#3	#5	
The Wailers	"Mau-Mau"	1959	#68			
Sandy Nelson	"Teen Beat"	1959	#4	#9	#17	The piano on the recording is by Bruce Johnston.
Santo & Johnny	"Sleep Walk"	1959	#1	#22	#4	
Santo & Johnny	"Tear Drop"	1959	#23	#50	#17	
Duane Eddy	"Some Kind-A Earthquake"	1959	#37	#12		
Johnny And The Hurricanes	"Reveille Rock"	1959	#25		#17	
The Fireballs	"Bulldog"	1960	#24			
The Champs	"Too Much Tequila"	1960	#30			
Johnny and the Hurricanes	"Beatnik Fly"	1960	#15	#8		
Bill Black's Combo	"White Silver Sands"	1960	#9	#33	#1	
Bill Black's Combo	"Don't Be Cruel"	1960	#11	#32	#1	
Duane Eddy	"Shazam"	1960	#45	#4		
Duane Eddy	"Because They're Young"	1960	#4	#2	#17	
Johnny and the Hurricanes	"Rocking Goose"	1960	#60	#3		
Duane Eddy	"Peter Gunn"	1960	#8	#6		This was the second charting of the song in 1959.
Floyd Cramer	"Last Date"	1960	#2	#32		
The Shadows	"Apache"	1960		#1		
The Shadows	"Man of Mystery"	1960		#5		
The Ventures	"Walk, Don't Run"	1960	#1	#8	#13	
Paul Revere & the Raiders	"Like, Long Hair"	1960	#38			
Duane Eddy	"Pepe"	1961	#18	#2		
B. Bumble and the Stingers	"Bumble Boogie"	1961	#21			
The Fireballs	"Quite a Party"	1961	#27	#29		
Kokomo	"Asia Minor"	1961	#8		#35	Adopted from the Edvard Grieg, Piano Concerto in A minor and subsequently banned by the BBC.
The Mar-Keys	"Last Night"	1961	#3	#2		
Sandy Nelson	"Let There Be Drums"	1961	#7	#3		
The Shadows	"F.B.I."	1961		#6		
The Shadows	"The Frightened City"	1961		#3		
The Shadows	"Kon-Tiki"	1961		#1		
The Shadows	"The Savage"	1961		#10		
The String-A-Longs	"Wheels"	1961	#3	#8	#19	
Billy Joe and the Checkmates	"Percolator (Twist)"	1962	#10			
The Champs	"Limbo Rock"	1962	#40			
Jet Harris	"Besame Mucho"	1962		#22		
King Curtis	"Soul Twist"	1962	#17		#1	
Sandy Nelson	"Drums Are My Beat"	1962	#29	#30		
The Shadows	"Wonderful Land"	1962		#1		
The Shadows	"Guitar Tango"	1962		#4		
The Shadows	"Dance On!"	1962		#1		
The Tornados	"Telstar"	1962	#1	#1	#5	
Booker T. & the M.G.'s	"Green Onions"	1962	#3		#1	
The Busters	"Bust Out"	1963	#25			
The Dakotas	"The Cruel Sea"	1963		#18		
Jet Harris and Tony Meehan	"Scarlett O'Hara"	1963		#2		
Lonnie Mack	"Memphis"	1963	#5		#4	
Lonnie Mack	Wham!	1963	#24			From the album The Wham of that Memphis Man
The Marketts	"Out of Limits"	1963	#3			
Link Wray & His Ray Men	"Jack The Ripper"	1963	#64			Released in 1961, but didn't chart until 1963.
Jack Nitzsche	"The Lonely Surfer"	1963	#39			
The Rockin' Rebels aka The Rebels	"Wild Weekend"	1963	#8	#3	#28	
The Shadows	"Foot Tapper"	1963		#1		
The Surfaris	"Wipe Out"	1963	#2	#5	#10	
The Pyramids	"Penetration"	1964	#18			Adapted from Edvard Grieg's Piano Concerto in A minor.
The T-Bones	"No Matter What Shape (Your Stomach's In)"	1965	#3			
The Viscounts	"Harlem Nocturne"	1966	#39		#17	Originally released in 1960, peaking at #52 on Billboard and #28 on CashBox. A 1965 re-release resulted in the record topping its previous peak, reaching #39.
The Bar-Kays	"Soul Finger"	1967	#17	#33	#3	
Cliff Nobles & Co.	"The Horse"	1968	#2	#2		
Fleetwood Mac	"Albatross"	1968		#1		Charted again (#2) in Britain in 1972.
Hugh Masekela	"Grazing in the Grass"	1968	#1		#1	
Mason Williams	"Classical Gas"	1968	#2		#9	"orchestrated rock and roll" backed by the Wrecking Crew
Booker T. & the M.G.'s	"Time Is Tight"	1969	#6		#7	from the film Uptight
The Ventures	"Hawaii Five-O"	1969	#4			

=== 1970s and 1980s chartings ===
Artist	Song title	Date	Highest position on US charts	Highest position on UK charts	Highest position on R&B charts	Miscellaneous
Dennis Coffey	Scorpio	1971	#6	#7	#9	
Hot Butter	Popcorn	1972	#9	#5		
Billy Preston	Outa-Space	1972	#2	#44	#1	
Deodato	Also Sprach Zarathustra (2001)	1973	#2	#7		based on Richard Strauss's Also sprach Zarathustra
Edgar Winter Group	Frankenstein	1973	#1	#18		
The Love Unlimited Orchestra	Love's Theme	1973	#1	#10	#10	orchestra formed and song written by Barry White
Billy Preston	Space Race	1973	#4		#1	
Average White Band	Pick Up the Pieces	1974	#1	#6	#5	
B. T. Express	Express	1974	#2	#34	#1	
The Commodores	Machine Gun	1974	#22	#20	#7	
Focus	Hocus Pocus	1974	#9	#20		
MFSB	TSOP (The Sound of Philadelphia)	1974	#1	#22	#1	
Silver Convention	Fly, Robin, Fly	1975	#1	#28	#1	
Van McCoy	The Hustle	1975	#1	#3	#1	
Mike Post	The Rockford Files (Theme)	1975	#10			
Walter Murphy	A Fifth Of Beethoven	1976	#1	#28	#10	based on the first movement of Ludwig van Beethoven's Fifth Symphony
Rhythm Heritage	Theme from S.W.A.T.	1976	#1		#11	
Chuck Mangione	Feels So Good	1977	#4			
Herb Alpert	Rise	1979	#1	#13	#4	

== 0-9 ==
=== 10cc ===
- "How Dare You" (How Dare You! (album), 1976)

=== 38 Special ===
- " Robin Hood" (Wild Eyed Southern Boys, 1980)

== A ==
=== ABBA ===
- "Intermezzo No. 1" (ABBA, 1975)
- "Arrival" (Arrival, 1976)

=== AC/DC ===
- "Fling Thing" (B-side of "Jailbreak", 1976)
- "D.T." ("From album: Who Made Who", 1985)
- "Chase the Ace" ("From album: Who Made Who", 1985)

=== Aerosmith ===
- "The Movie" ("From album: Permanent Vacation", 1987)
- "Krawhitham" (Pandora's Box, 1991)
- "Circle Jerk" (Pandora's Box, 1991)
- "Boogie Man" (Get a Grip, 1993)

=== The Allman Brothers Band ===
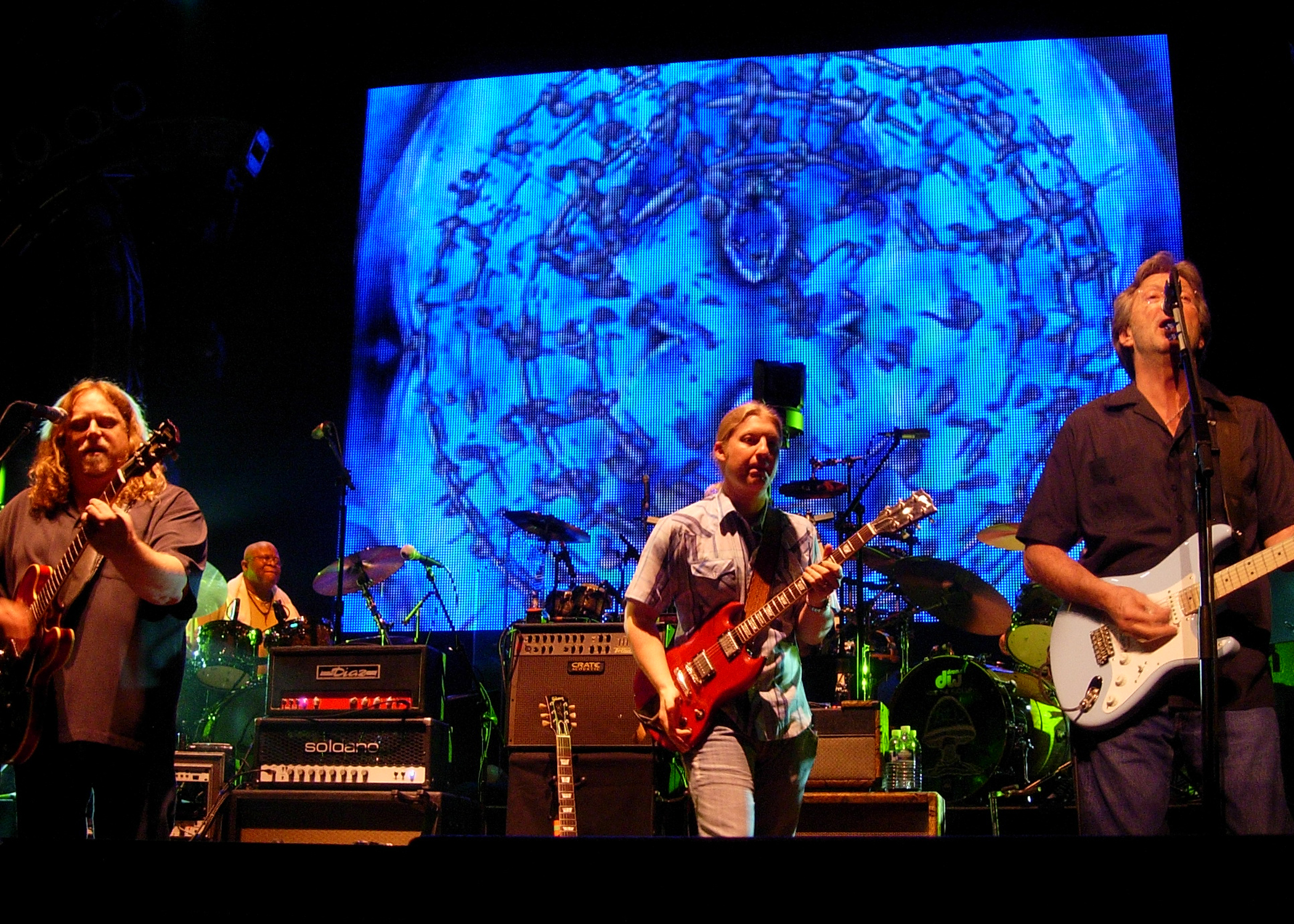
The Allman Brothers Band with special guest Eric Clapton.

- "In Memory of Elizabeth Reed" (Idlewild South, 1970)
- "Hot 'Lanta" (At Fillmore East, 1971)
- "Mountain Jam" (Eat a Peach, 1972)
- "Little Martha" (Eat a Peach, 1972)
- "Jessica" (Brothers and Sisters, 1973)
- "Pegasus" (Enlightened Rogues, 1979)

=== Herb Alpert ===
- "Rise", (1979), No. 1 US, No. 13 UK, No. 4 R&B

=== And So I Watch You from Afar ===
- And So I Watch You from Afar (2009)

=== Animals as Leaders ===
- "Animals as Leaders" (2009)
- "Wave of Babies" (Single) (2010)
- "Weightless" (2011)
- "The Joy of Motion" (2014)
- "The Madness of Many" (2016)
- "Parrhesia" (2022)

=== Ray Anthony ===
- Peter Gunn (1959), No. 8 US, No. 22 UK, No. 4 R&B song's composer Henry Mancini wrote that it, "actually derives more from rock and roll than from jazz".

=== Anthrax ===
- "Pipeline" (Attack of the Killer B's, 1991)

=== Apocalyptica ===
- Plays Metallica by Four Cellos (1996)
- Inquisition Symphony (1998)
- Cult (2000) The Standard Version it's all instrumental and the Special Edition Disk 2 include: "Path Vol. 2" feat. Sandra Nasić and "Hope Vol. 2" feat. Matthias Sayer on vocals.
- Reflections (2003) On The Revised, Russian Edition & 2005 US Reissue it's include: "Seemann (Rammstein Cover)" feat. Nina Hagen on vocals.
- Apocalyptica (2005) Vocals: "Life Burns!" & "Bittersweet" feat. Lauri Ylönen; "En Vie" feat. Manu; On Special Edition Bonus Tracks: "How Far" & "Wie Weit" Marta Jandová.
- Amplified // A Decade of Reinventing the Cello It consists the band's most notable covers and original songs on 2 CDs, one for the instrumentals tunes and the other for the tunes with vocals.
- Worlds Collide (2003) Vocals: "I Don't Care" Adam Gontier of Three Days Grace; "I'm Not Jesus" Corey Taylor of Slipknot, Stone Sour; "S.O.S (Anything but Love)" Cristina Scabbia of Lacuna Coil, additionals backing vocals: Mats Levén of Therion, Krux; "Helden" Till Lindemann of Rammstein.
- 7th Symphony (2003) Vocals: "End of Me" Gavin Rossdale of Bush; "Not Strong Enough (Album Version)" Brent Smith of Shinedown; "Not Strong Enough (US Single Version)" Doug Robb of Hoobastank; "Broken Pieces" Lacey Mosley of Flyleaf; "Bring Them to Light" Joe Duplantier of Gojira.
- Wagner Reloaded-Live in Leipzig (2013)

=== Reginald "Fieldy" Arvizu and various artists ===
- "A Song for Chi" (2009)

=== Asia ===
- Rare (2000)

=== August Burns Red ===
- "Carol of the Bells" (online single, 2007)
- "O Come O Come, Emmanuel" (O Come, O Come, Emmanuel 7", 2009)
- "The Little Drummer Boy" (God Rest Ye Merry Gentlemen 7", 2011)

=== Avenged Sevenfold ===
- "Jade Helm" (Black Reign EP, 2018)

=== Average White Band ===
- "Pick Up the Pieces", (1974), No. 1 US, No. 6 UK

=== AVKRVST ===
- "Østerdalen" (The Approbation, 2023)
- "Preceding" (Waving at the Sky, 2025)

== B ==
=== The Bar-Kays ===
- "Soul Finger", (1967), No. 17 US, No. 33 UK, No. 3 R&B

=== Michael Angelo Batio ===
- No Boundaries (1995)
- Planet Gemini (1997)
- Tradition (1999)
- Lucid Intervals and Moments of Clarity (2000)

=== The Beach Boys ===
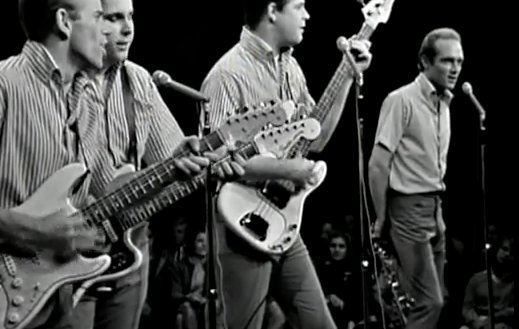
The Beach Boys in 1964. From left: Al Jardine, Carl Wilson, Brian Wilson and Mike Love (drummer Dennis Wilson not shown).

- "Moon Dawg" (Surfin' Safari, 1962)
- "Misirlou" (Surfin' U.S.A., 1963)
- "Let's Go Trippin'" (Surfin' U.S.A.)
- "Honky Tonk" (Surfin' U.S.A., 1963)
- "Surf Jam" (Surfin' U.S.A., 1963)
- "Stoked" (Surfin' U.S.A., 1963)
- "The Rocking Surfer" (Surfer Girl, 1963)
- "Boogie Woodie" (Surfer Girl, 1963)
- "Denny's Drums" (Shut Down Volume 2, 1964)
- "Carl's Big Chance" (All Summer Long, 1964)
- "Summer Means New Love" (Summer Days, 1965)
- "Let's Go Away for Awhile" (Pet Sounds, 1966)
- "Pet Sounds" (Pet Sounds)
- "Look" (recorded at sessions for Smile, later released with vocals)
- "I Wanna Be Around" / "Workshop" (The Smile Sessions, 2011)
- "The Elements: Fire" (The Smile Sessions)
- "Fall Breaks and Back to Winter (W. Woodpecker Symphony)" (Smiley Smile)
- "Passing By" (Friends)
- "Diamond Head" (Friends)
- "The Nearest Faraway Place" (20/20)

=== Beastie Boys ===
- Sabrosa (1994)
- The in Sound from Way Out! (1996)
- The Mix-Up (2007)
- Multilateral Nuclear Disarmament (2011)

=== The Beatles ===
- "Cry for a Shadow" (1964)
- "Flying" (Magical Mystery Tour, 1967)
- "Cayenne" (Anthology 1, 1995)
- "12-Bar Original" (Anthology 2, 1996)

=== Jeff Beck ===
Most of Beck's recordings following the dissolution of The Jeff Beck Group are instrumentals.

- "Beck's Bolero" (B-side of "Hi Ho Silver Lining", 1967), featuring Jimmy Page, Keith Moon, John Paul Jones, and Nicky Hopkins
- Blow by Blow (1975)
- Wired (1976)
- There & Back (1980)
- Escape Flash, (1985)
- Jeff Beck's Guitar Shop (1989)
- Frankie's House (1992)
- Who Else! (1999)
- You Had It Coming (2001)
- Jeff (2003)
- Emotion & Commotion (2010)
- Loud Hailer (2016)

=== Jason Becker ===
- Perpetual Burn (1988)
- Perspective (1995)
- The Raspberry Jams (1999)
- The Blackberry Jams (2003)

=== Bee Gees ===
- "Seven Seas Symphony" (Odessa, 1969)

=== Bill Black's Combo ===
Most, if not all, of the Bill Black Combo's recordings are instrumentals.

- "White Silver Sands", (1960), No. 9 US, No. 33 UK, No. 1 R&B
- "Don't Be Cruel", (1960), No. 11 US, No. 32 UK, No. 1 R&B

=== Black Flag ===
- The Process of Weeding Out EP (1985)

=== Black Sabbath ===
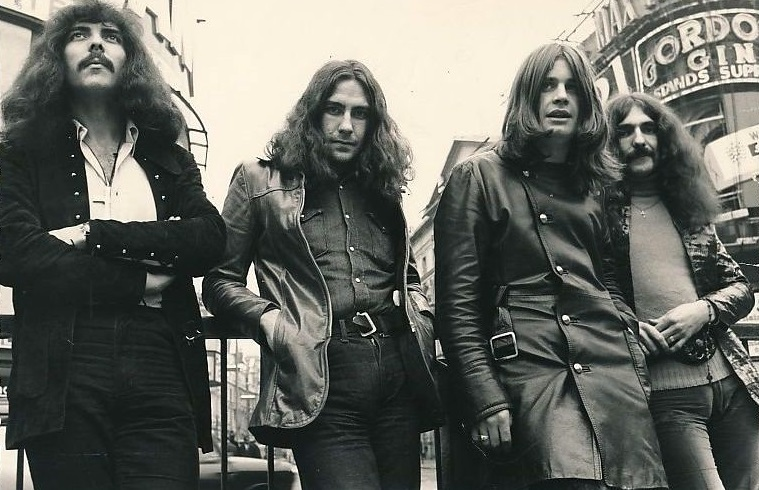
Black Sabbath in 1970.

- "Rat Salad" (Paranoid, 1971)
- "Embryo" (Master of Reality, 1971)
- "Orchid" (Master of Reality, 1971)
- "FX" (Vol. 4, 1972)
- "Laguna Sunrise" (Vol. 4, 1972)
- "Fluff" (Sabbath Bloody Sabbath, 1973)
- "Don't Start (Too Late)" (Sabotage, 1975)
- "Supertzar" (Sabotage, 1975)
- "Breakout" (Never Say Die!, 1978)
- "E5150" (Mob Rules, 1981)
- "Stonehenge" (Born Again, 1983)
- "The Dark" (Born Again, 1983)
- "Sphinx (The Guardian)" (Seventh Star, 1986)
- "Scarlet Pimpernel" (The Eternal Idol, 1987)
- "The Gates Of Hell" (Headless Cross, 1989)
- "The Battle Of Tyr" (Tyr, 1990)

=== Blaqk Audio ===
- "Stiff Kittens" (CexCells, 2007)

=== Booker T. and the M.G.'s ===
Most, if not all, of the band's recordings are instrumentals.

=== Boston ===
- "Foreplay" (Boston, 1976)
- "A New World" (Third Stage, 1986)
- "Walkin' at Night" (Walk On, 1994)
- "Get Organ-ized"/"Get Reorgan-ized" (Walk On, 1994)
- "The Star-Spangled Banner/4th of July Reprise" (Greatest Hits", 1997)
- "Last Day of School" (Life, Love & Hope, 2013)

=== David Bowie ===
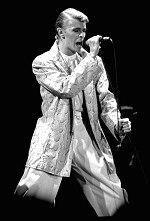
David Bowie in 1978.

- "Speed of Life" (Low, 1977)
- "A New Career in a New Town" (Low)
- "Warszawa" (Low)
- "Art Decade" (Low)
- "Weeping Wall" (Low)
- "V-2 Schneider" ("Heroes", 1977)
- "Sense of Doubt" ("Heroes")
- "Moss Garden" ("Heroes")
- "Neuköln" ("Heroes")
- "Crystal Japan" (Japanese single, 1980)
- "The Wedding" (Black Tie White Noise, 1993

=== Bring Me the Horizon ===
- "Slow Dance" (Count Your Blessings, 2006)
- "Fifteen Fathoms, Counting" (Count Your Blessings)
- "Moon Over the Castle" (Find Your Line: Official Music from GRAN TURISMO 7, 2022)

=== B. T. Express ===
- "Express", (1974), No. 2 US,#34 UK, No. 1 R&B,

=== Roy Buchanan ===
- "Sweet Dreams" (Roy Buchanan, 1972)

=== Buckethead ===
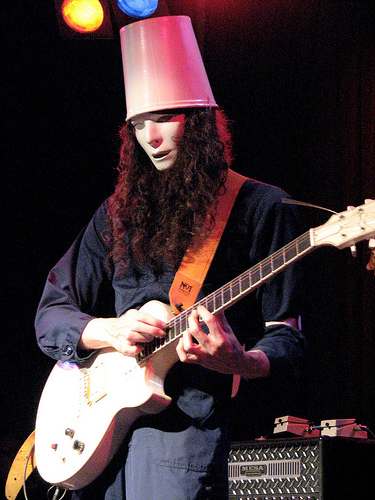
Buckethead performing in Seattle in 2008.

Most, if not all, of Buckethead's recordings are instrumentals.

- "Sketches of Spain (For Miles)" (Electric Tears, 2002)
- "Spokes for the Wheel of Torment" (The Cuckoo Clocks of Hell, 2004)
- "Jordan" (Guitar Hero II, 2006)

=== B. Bumble and the Stingers ===
Most, if not all, of B. Bumble and the Stingers' recordings are instrumentals.

- "Bumble Boogie", (1961), No. 21 US, based on Rimsky-Korsakov's "Flight of the Bumble Bee"
- "Nut Rocker" (1962), The recording is a version of the march from Tchaikovsky's ballet The Nutcracker.

=== The Byrds ===
- "John Riley" & "Captain Soul", (Fifth Dimension, 1966)

== C ==
=== Café Tacuba ===
- "Perfidia" (Avalancha de Éxitos, 1996)
- Revés (1999)

=== Cake ===
- "Arco Arena" (Comfort Eagle, 2001)

=== Calexico ===
- Tool Box (2007)

=== Camel ===
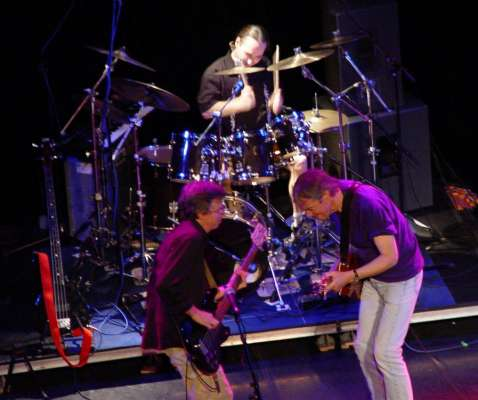
Camel in 2003.

- Supertwister (Mirage, 1974)
- Earthrise (Mirage)
- The Snow Goose (1975)
- Aristillus (Moonmadness, 1976)
- Chord Change (Moonmadness)
- Lunar Sea (Moonmadness)
- First Light (Rain Dances, 1977)
- One of These Days I'll Get an Early Night (Rain Dances)
- Elke (Rain Dances)
- Skylines (Rain Dances)
- Rain Dances (Rain Dances)
- The Sleeper (Breathless, 1978)
- Eye of the Storm (I Can See Your House from Here, 1979)
- Survival (I Can See Your House from Here)
- Ice (I Can See Your House from Here)
- Pressure Points (Stationary Traveller, 1984)
- Missing(Stationary Traveller)
- After Words(Stationary Traveller)
- Dust Bowl (Dust and Dreams, 1991)
- Dusted Out (Dust and Dreams)
- Needles (Dust and Dreams)
- Milk and Honey (Dust and Dreams)
- Storm Clouds (Dust and Dreams)
- Cotton Camp (Dust and Dreams)
- Broken Banks (Dust and Dreams)
- Sheet Rain (Dust and Dreams)
- Whispers (Dust and Dreams)
- Little Rivers and Little Rose (Dust and Dreams)
- Hopeless Anger (Dust and Dreams)
- Whispers in the Rain (Dust and Dreams)
- Irish Air (Instrumental Reprise) (Harbour of Tears, 1996)
- Cóbh (Harbour of Tears)
- Under the Moon (Harbour of Tears)
- Generations (Harbour of Tears)
- Running from Paradise (Harbour of Tears)
- Coming of Age (Harbour of Tears)
- The Hour Candle (A Song for my Father) (Harbour of Tears)
- Three Wishes (Rajaz, 1999)
- Sahara (Rajaz)

=== Camper Van Beethoven ===
- "Interstellar Overdrive" (Camper Van Beethoven, 1986)

=== Gustavo Cerati ===
- +Bien (2001)

=== The Champs ===
Most, if not all, of the Champs recordings are instrumentals.

- "Tequila" (1959), No. 1 US, No. 5 UK, No. 1 R&B
- "Limbo Rock" (1962), No. 40 US featured Earl Palmer on drums, Tommy Tedesco on guitar, and Plas Johnson on sax

=== The Chantays ===
- "Pipeline" (Pipeline, 1963)

=== The Chemical Brothers ===
- "Song to the Siren" (Exit Planet Dust, 1992)

=== Chicago ===
- "Ballet for a Girl in Buchannon: Anxiety's Moment" (Chicago, 1970)
- "Ballet for a Girl in Buchannon: West Virginia Fantasies" (Chicago)
- "Ballet for a Girl in Buchannon: To Be Free" (Chicago)

=== Eric Clapton ===
- "Edge of Darkness" (24 Nights, 1991)

=== Eric Clapton and the Powerhouse ===
- Steppin' Out, ("What's Shakin'", 1966), Eric Clapton guitar, Paul Jones harmonica, Jack Bruce bass, Steve Winwood vocals and Pete York drums.

=== The Dave Clark Five ===
- Instrumental Album (1966)

=== Bruce Cockburn ===
- "Nude Descending a Staircase" (Life Short Call Now)

=== Dennis Coffey ===
- "Scorpio", (1971), No. 6 US, No. 7 UK, No. 9 R&B

=== The Commodores ===
- "Machine Gun", (1974), No. 22 US, No. 20 UK, No. 7 R&B

=== Dave "Baby" Cortez ===
- "The Happy Organ" (1959), No. 1 US, No. 5 R&B

=== Floyd Cramer ===
Most, if not all, of the Floyd Cramer's recordings are instrumentals.

- "Last Date", (1960), No. 2 US, No. 32 UK

=== Cream ===
- "Toad" (Fresh Cream, 1966)
- "Steppin' Out" (Live Cream Volume II, 1972)

=== Creedence Clearwater Revival ===
- "Susie Q. (Part 2)" (B-side of single, 1968, excerpted from longer album track which contained vocals)
- "Poorboy Shuffle" (Willie and the Poor Boys 1969)
- "Side o' the Road" (Willie and the Poor Boys, 1969)

=== The Crown ===
- "Where My Grave Shall Stand" (Cobra Speed Venom, 2018)

=== King Curtis ===
- "Soul Twist", (1962), No. 17 US, No. 1 R&B

== D ==
=== The Dakotas ===
- "The Cruel Sea", (1963), No. 18 UK

=== Dick Dale ===
Most of Dale's recordings are instrumentals.

- "Let's Go Trippin'" (1961)
- "Misirlou" (1962)

=== Deep Purple ===
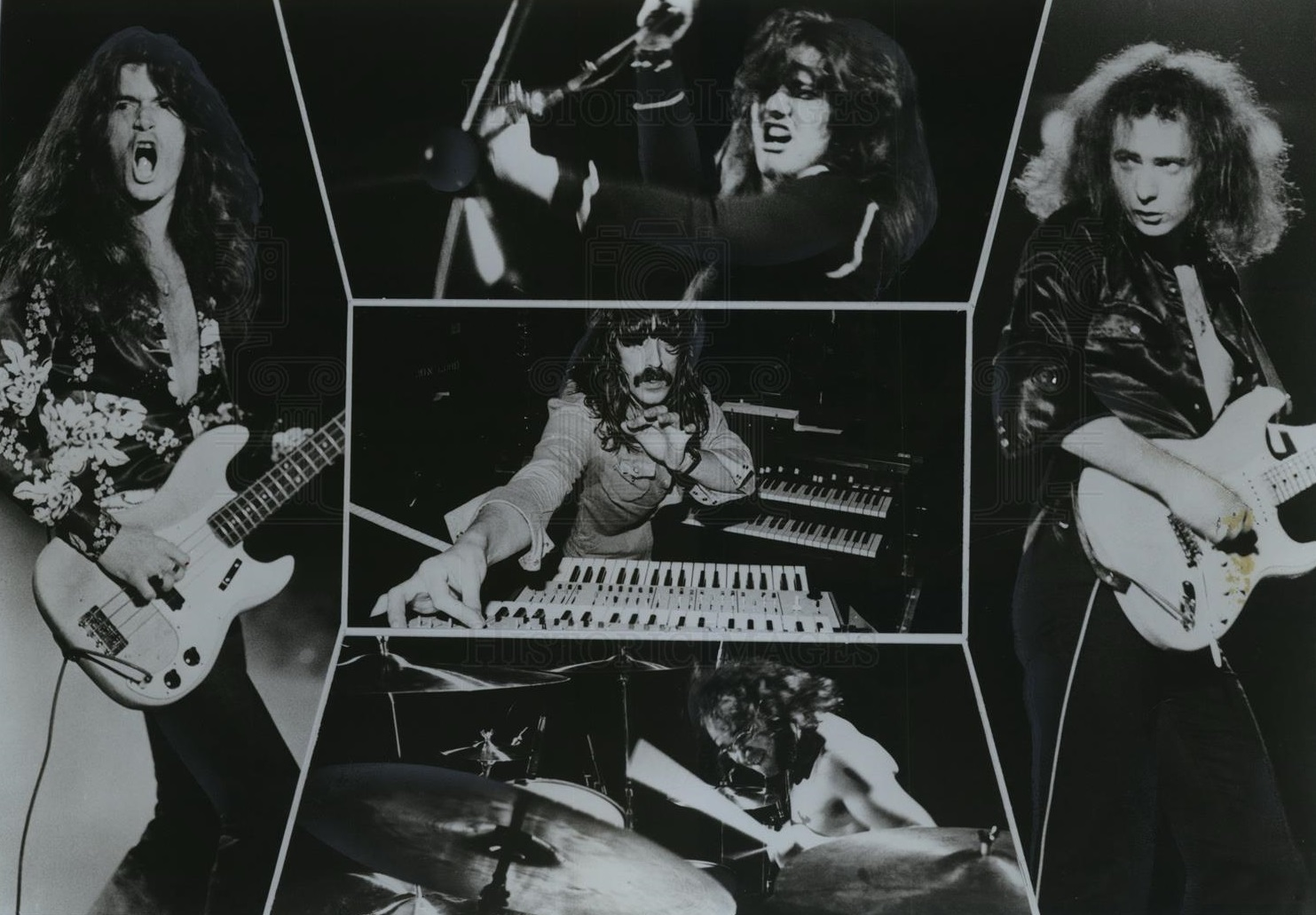
Deep Purple in 1975.

- "And The Address" (Shades Of Deep Purple, 1968)
- "Wring That Neck" (Book Of Taliesyn, 1968)
- "Fault Line" (Deep Purple, 1969)
- "'A' 200" (Burn, 1974)
- "Coronarias Redig" ("Might Just Take Your Life" single B-side, 1974)
- "Owed To 'G'" (Come Taste The Band, 1975)
- "Son Of Alerik" ("Perfect Strangers" single B-side, 1985)

=== Deodato ===
- "Also Sprach Zarathustra (2001)", (1973), No. 2 US, No. 7 UK, based on Richard Strauss's Also sprach Zarathustra

=== Derek and the Dominos ===
- "Tell the Truth (Jam No. 1)" (The Layla Sessions)

=== Destroyalldreamers ===
Most, if not all, of the band's recordings are instrumentals.

=== Dixie Dregs ===
Most, if not all, of the band's recordings are instrumentals.

=== Bill Doggett ===
- "Honky Tonk (Parts 1 & 2)" (1956) No. 2 US No. 1 R&B
- "Slow Walk" (1956) No. 26 US No. 4 R&B
- "Soft" (1957) No. 35 US

=== Down ===
- "Pray for the Locust" (NOLA, 1995)
- "Doobinterlude" (Down II: A Bustle in Your Hedgerow, 2002)
- "Flambeaux's Jamming with St. Aug" (Down II: A Bustle in Your Hedgerow, 2002)

=== Dream Theater ===
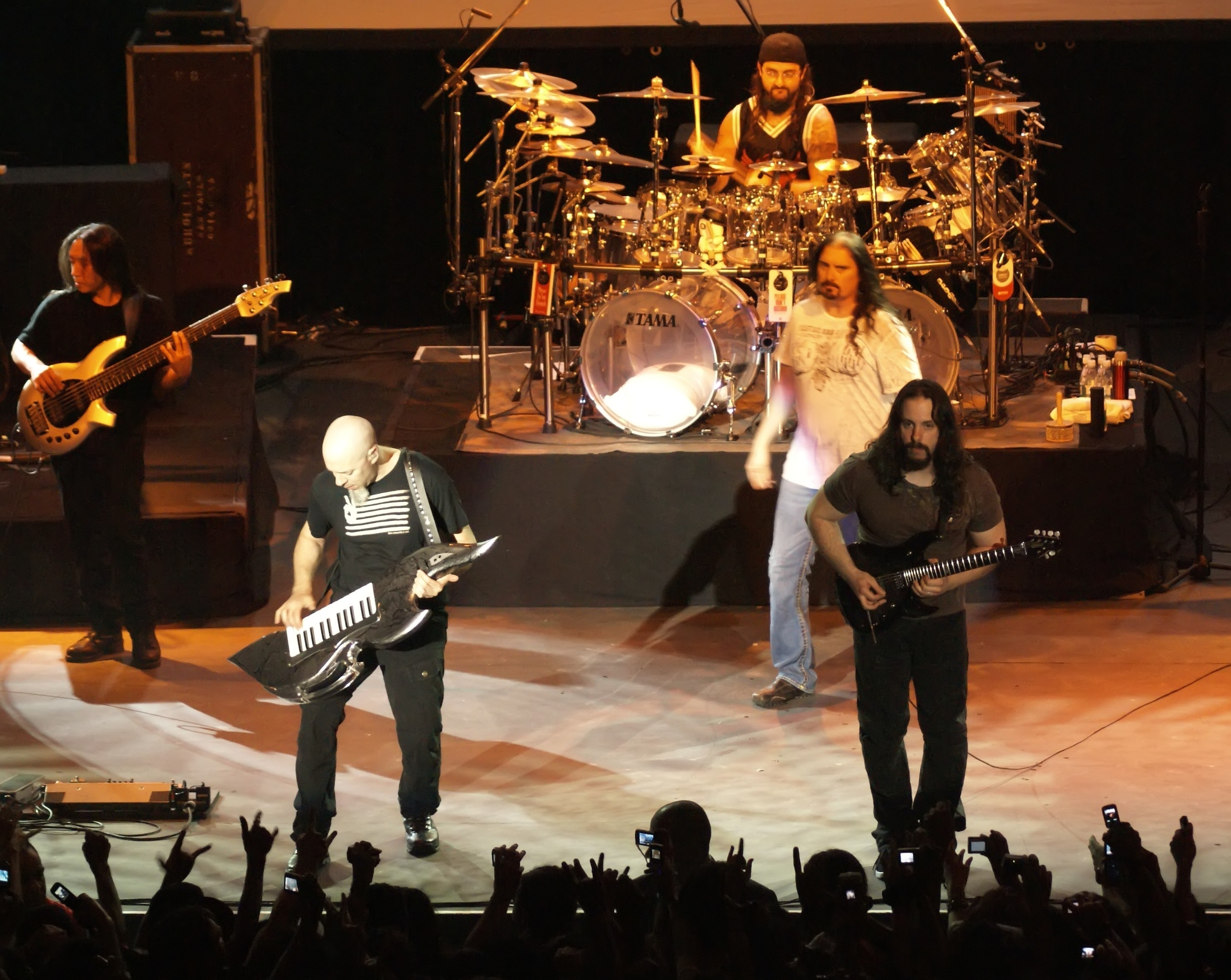
Dream Theater performing in Brazil in 2008. Vocalist James LaBrie roams the stage while his bandmates perform an instrumental passage.

- "Ytse Jam" (When Dream and Day Unite, 1989)
- "Another Hand" (Live at the Marquee, 1993)
- "Bombay Vindaloo" (Live at the Marquee, 1993)
- "A Mind Beside Itself I: Erotomania" (Awake, 1994)
- "Eve" (The Silent Man single, 1994)
- "A Change of Seasons I: The Crimson Sunrise" (A Change of Seasons, 1995)
- "A Change of Seasons IV: The Darkest of Winters" (A Change of Seasons, 1995)
- "A Change of Seasons VI: The Inevitable Summer" (A Change of Seasons, 1995)
- "Cruise Control" (A Change of Seasons, 1995)
- "Funeral For a Friend" (A Change of Seasons, 1995)
- "The Rover" (A Change of Seasons, 1995)
- "Hell's Kitchen" (Falling Into Infinity, 1997)
- "Trial of Tears II: Deep In Heaven" (Falling Into Infinity, 1997)
- "Puppies on Acid" (Once in a LIVEtime, 1998)
- "Scene Two: Overture 1928" (Metropolis Pt. 2: Scenes from a Memory, 1999)
- "Scene Seven: The Dance Of Eternity" (Metropolis Pt. 2: Scenes from a Memory, 1999)
- "Acid Rain" (Live Scenes From New York, 2001)
- "Six Degrees of Inner Turbulence: I. Overture" (Six Degrees of Inner Turbulence, 2002)
- "Stream of Consciousness" (Train of Thought, 2003)
- "Instrumedley" (Live at Budokan, 2004)
- "In the Presence of Enemies I: Prelude" (Systematic Chaos, 2007)
- "In the Presence of Enemies V: The Reckoning" (Systematic Chaos, 2007)
- "Larks' Tongues in Aspic - Part II" (Special Edition of Black Clouds & Silver Linings, 2009)
- "Odyssey" (Special Edition of Black Clouds & Silver Linings, 2009)
- "Raw Dog" (God of War III Soundtrack, 2010)
- "False Awakening Suite" (Dream Theater, 2013)
- "Enigma Machine" (Dream Theater, 2013)
- "Illumination Theory I: Paradoxe de la Lumière Noire" (Dream Theater, 2013)
- "Illumination Theory III: The Embracing Circle" (Dream Theater, 2013)
- "Dystopian Overture" (The Astonishing, 2016)
- "2285 Entr'acte" (The Astonishing, 2016)
- "Distance over Time Instrumental Mixes" (2019)
- "A View from the Top of the World Instrumental Mixes" (2021)
- "In the Arms of Morpheus" (Parasomnia, 2025)

=== Duran Duran ===
- "Tel Aviv", (Duran Duran, 1981)
- "Tiger Tiger" (Seven and the Ragged Tiger, 1983)

=== The Durutti Column ===
Most of the band's recordings are instrumentals.

=== Bob Dylan ===
- "Woogie Boogie", (Self Portrait, 1970)
- "Wigwam", (Self Portrait, 1970)

== E ==
=== Earthless ===
Most, if not all, of the band's recordings are instrumentals.

=== Duane Eddy ===
Most, if not all, of the Duane Eddy's recordings are instrumentals.

- "Rebel Rouser" (1958), No. 6 US, No. 8 UK, No. 19 R&B, saxophone by session musician Gil Bernal, yells and handclaps by doo-wop group the Rivingtons.
- "Peter Gunn" (1959), No. 8 US, No. 6 UK, this was the second charting of the song in 1959

=== Electric Light Orchestra ===
- "Daybreaker" (On the Third Day, 1973)
- "In the Hall of the Mountain King" (On the Third Day)
- "Fire on High" (Face the Music, 1975)
- "The Whale" (Out of the Blue, 1977)

=== Emerson, Lake and Palmer ===
- "The Barbarian" (Emerson, Lake & Palmer, 1970)
- "Tank" (Emerson, Lake & Palmer)
- "Nut Rocker" (Pictures at an Exhibition)
- "Hoedown" (Trilogy, 1972)
- "Karn Evil 9: Second Impression" (Brain Salad Surgery, 1973)
- "Fanfare for the Common Man" (Works Volume 1, 1977)
- "Canario" (Love Beach, 1978)

=== An Endless Sporadic ===
- "Ameliorate" (EP, 2008)
- "An Endless Sporadic" (Album, 2009)
- "Spaceship Factory" (Single, 2014)
- "Derpulous" (Single, 2014)
- "The Adventures of Jabubu II" (Single, 2015)
- "Magic Machine" (Album, 2016)

=== Preston Epps ===
- "Bongo Rock" (1959), No. 14 US

=== Explosions in the Sky ===
Most, if not all, of the band's recordings are instrumentals.

== F ==
=== The Fabulous Thunderbirds ===
- "Cherry Pink and Apple Blossom White" (Butt Rockin', 1981)

=== Family ===
- "Variation on a Theme of 'Hey Mr. Policeman'" (Music in a Doll's House, 1968)
- "Variation on a Theme of 'The Breeze'" (Music in a Doll's House, 1968)
- "Variation on a Theme of 'Me My Friend'" (Music in a Doll's House, 1968)
- "Summer '67" (Family Entertainment, 1969)
- "93's OK J" (A Song for Me, 1970)
- "Normans" (Anyway,1970)
- "Crinkly Grin" (Fearless, 1971)
- "Banger" (It's Only a Movie, 1973)

(Note: Bandstand, from 1972, is the only Family album that does not feature an instrumental track.)

=== Harold Faltermeyer and Steve Stevens ===
- "Top Gun Anthem" (soundtrack to Top Gun, 1986)

=== Fleetwood Mac ===
- "Albatross"/"Jigsaw Puzzle Blues" (1969, included on UK release The Pious Bird of Good Omen/US release English Rose)
- "Oh Well Part 2" (B-side of single, 1969, included on US reissue of Then Play On)
- "Sunny Side of Heaven" (Bare Trees, 1972)

=== A Flock of Seagulls ===
- "DNA" (A Flock of Seagulls, 1982)

=== Focus ===
Most, if not all, of Focus' recordings are instrumentals.

- "Hocus Pocus" (Focus II, 1971)

=== Marty Friedman ===
- Dragon's Kiss (1988)
- Scenes (1992)
- Introduction (1994)
- True Obsessions (1996)
- Music For Speeding (2002)
- Loudspeaker (2006)

=== The Bobby Fuller Four ===
- "Misirlou", 1964

=== Peter Frampton ===
- Fingerprints (2006)
- Frampton Forgets the Words (2021)

=== FromUz ===
- "13th August" (Overlook, 2008)

=== Funkadelic ===
- "Maggot Brain" (Maggot Brain, 1971)

== G ==
=== Peter Gabriel ===
- Birdy (1985) (portions of the album are instrumental reworkings of previously recorded vocal tracks)
- Passion: Music for The Last Temptation of Christ (1989)
- Long Walk Home: Music from the Rabbit-Proof Fence (2002) (also contains elements from previously recorded vocal tracks)
- The first twelve tracks on Disc 2 of the deluxe edition of New Blood (2011) are instrumental versions of the first twelve tracks on the main album

=== Genesis ===
- '"Horizons" (Foxtrot (album), 1972)
- "After the Ordeal" (Selling England by the Pound, 1973)
- "Los Endos" (A Trick of the Tail, 1976)
- "Wot Gorilla?" (Wind & Wuthering, 1976)
- "'Unquiet Slumbers for the Sleepers..." (Wind & Wuthering, 1976)
- "...in That Quiet Earth'" (Wind & Wuthering, 1976)
- "Duke's End" (Duke (album), 1980)
- "Second Home by the Sea" (Genesis (Genesis album)), 1983)
- "The Brazilian" (Invisible Touch, 1986)

=== Ghost ===
- "Miasma" (Prequelle, 2018)
- "Helvetesfonster" (Prequelle)

=== Paul Gilbert ===
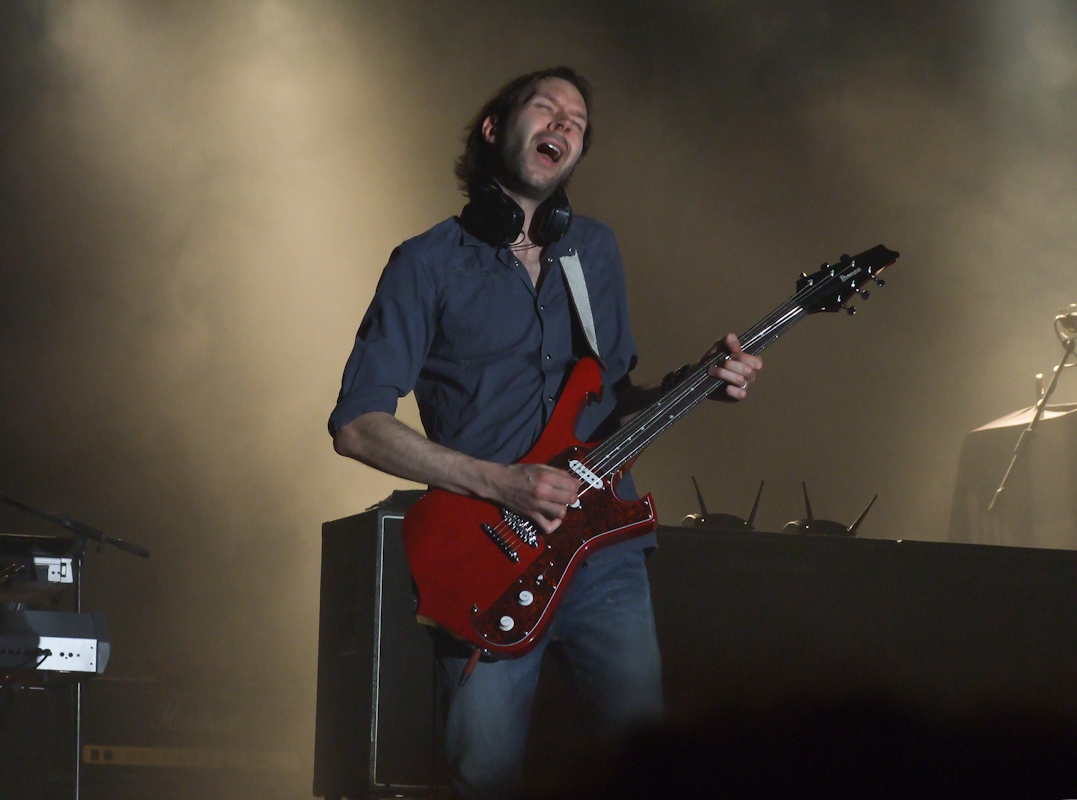
Paul Gilbert.

- "Gilberto Concerto" (Flying Dog, 1998)
- "Whole Lotta Sonata" (Alligator Farm)
- "G.V.R.O." (Burning Organ, 2002)
- Get Out of My Yard (2006)
- Silence Followed by a Deafening Roar (2008)
- Fuzz Universe (2010)

=== David Gilmour ===
- "Mihails" (David Gilmour, 1978)
- "Raise My Rent" (David Gilmour, 1978)
- "Let's Get Metaphysical" (About Face, 1984)
- "Castellorizon" (On an Island, 2006)
- "Red Sky at Night" (On an Island, 2006)
- "Then I Close My Eyes" (On an Island, 2006)
- "5 A.M." (Rattle That Lock, 2015)
- "Beauty" (Rattle That Lock, 2015)
- "And Then..." (Rattle That Lock, 2015)

=== Gary Glitter ===
- "Rock and Roll Part 2" (Glitter, 1972)

=== Godspeed You! Black Emperor ===
Most, if not all, of the band's recordings are instrumentals.

=== God Is an Astronaut ===
- The End of the Beginning (2002)
- All Is Violent, All Is Bright (2005)
- Far from Refuge (2007)
- God Is an Astronaut (2008)
- Age of the Fifth Sun (2010)

=== Godsmack ===
- "Vampires" (Awake, 2000)
- "The Oracle" (The Oracle, 2010)

=== Gorillaz ===
- "Lake Zurich" ("From album: The Now Now", 2018)

=== Gov't Mule ===
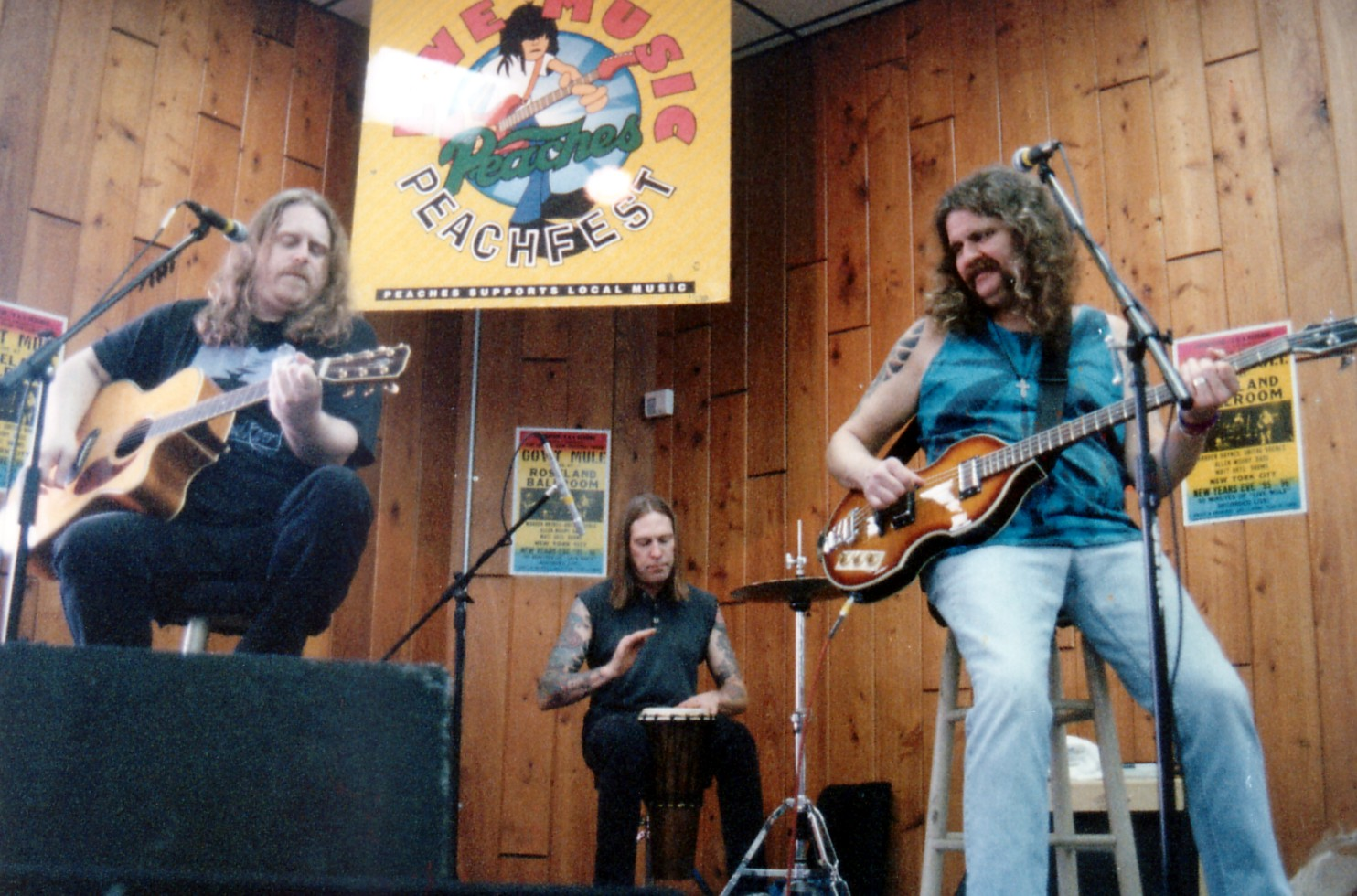
The original lineup of Gov't Mule (shown here performing an acoustic set) regularly performed and recorded instrumentals.

- Sco-Mule (2015)

=== Grails ===
Most, if not all, of the band's recordings are instrumentals.

=== Green Day ===
- "Last Ride in" (Nimrod_(album), 1997)
- "Espionage" (Shenanigans, 2002)

== H ==
=== Jan Hammer ===
- "Miami Vice Theme" (soundtrack to Miami Vice, 1985)
- "Crockett's Theme" (Miami Vice: The Complete Collection, 2002)

=== Kirk Hammett ===
- "Portals" (2022)

=== Hammock ===
Most, if not all, of the band's recordings are instrumentals.

=== Jet Harris ===
- "Besame Mucho", (1962), No. 22 UK

=== Jet Harris and Tony Meehan ===
- "Diamonds" (1963)
- "Scarlett O'Hara" (1963)

=== George Harrison ===
- Wonderwall Music (1968)
- Electronic Sound (1969)
- "Thanks for the Pepperoni" (All Things Must Pass, 1970)
- "I Remember Jeep" (All Things Must Pass, 1970)
- "Out of the Blue" (All Things Must Pass, 1970)
- "Plug Me In" (All Things Must Pass, 1970)
- "Hari's on Tour (Express)" (Dark Horse, 1974)
- "A Bit More of You" (Extra Texture, 1975)

=== The Jeff Healey Band ===
- "Hide Away" (See the Light, 1988)
- "Shapes of Things" (Cover to Cover, 1995)

=== Hellecasters ===
- "Sweet Dreams" (The Return of the Hellecasters, 1993)

=== Helloween ===
- "Deliberately Limited Preliminary Prelude Period In Z" (Better Than Raw, 1998)
- "Moshi Moshi~Shiki No Uta" (Better Than Raw Expanded Edition, 1998)

=== Jimi Hendrix ===
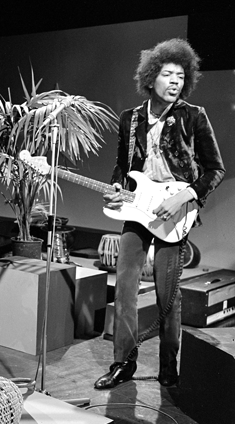
Jimi Hendrix

- "Third Stone from the Sun" (Are You Experienced, 1967)
- "Star Spangled Banner" (Woodstock: Music from the Original Soundtrack and More, 1970)
- "Pali Gap" (Rainbow Bridge, 1971)
- "Born Under a Bad Sign" (Blues, 1994)
- "Sunshine of Your Love" (Valleys of Neptune)

=== Gary Hoey ===
Most of Hoey's recordings are instrumentals.

=== Hot Butter ===
- "Popcorn", (1972), No. 9 US, No. 5 UK

== I ==
=== If These Trees Could Talk ===
Most, if not all, of the band's recordings are instrumentals.

=== Iron Maiden ===
- "Transylvania" (Iron Maiden, 1980)
- "The Ides of March" (Killers, 1981)
- "Genghis Khan" (Killers)
- "Losfer Words" (Powerslave, 1984)

== J ==
=== Jade Warrior ===
- Floating World (1974) (except "Monkey Chant", track 8)
- Waves (1975)
- Kites (1976)

=== Jazz Is Dead ===
Most, if not all, of the band's recordings are instrumentals.

=== Jefferson Airplane ===
- "Embryonic Journey" (Surrealistic Pillow, 1967)

=== Jethro Tull ===
- "Dharma for One" (This Was, 1968)
- "Bouree" (Stand Up, 1969)
- "Warm Sporran" (Stormwatch, 1979)
- "Elegy" (Stormwatch)
- "The Pine Marten's Jig" (A, 1980)

=== Johnny and the Hurricanes ===
Most, if not all, of the band's recordings are instrumentals.

- "Red River Rock" (1959), No. 5 US, No. 3 UK, No. 5 R&B

=== Elton John ===
- "Funeral for a Friend" (Goodbye Yellow Brick Road, 1973)

=== Eric Johnson ===
- "Tones" (1986)
- "Ah Via Musicom" (1990)
- "Venus Isle" (1996)
- "Seven Worlds" (1998)
- "Souvenir" (2002)
- "Bloom" (2005)
- "Up Close" (2010)
- "Mrs. Robinson" (EJ, 2016)
- "Once Upon A Time In Texas" (EJ, 2016)
- "Serinidad" (EJ, 2016)
- "Fatherly Downs" (EJ, 2016)
- "The World is Waiting For The Sunrise" (EJ, 2016)
- "Song For Irene" (EJ, 2016)
- "Collage", 2017)
- "Charldron's Boat" (EJ Vol II, 2020)
- "Lake Travis" (EJ Vol II, 2020)
- "Black Waterside" (EJ Vol II, 2020)
- "For The Stars" (EJ Vol II, 2020)

=== Billy Joel ===
- "Nocturne" (Cold Spring Harbor, 1971)
- "Root Beer Rag" (Streetlife Serenade, 1974)
- "The Mexican Connection" (Streetlife Serenade, 1974)
- "Prelude" (Turnstiles, 1976)

=== Bradley Joseph ===
- Hear the Masses (1994)

=== Journey ===
- Kohoutek (Journey, 1975)
- Topaz (Journey, 1975)
- Nickel and Dime (Next, 1977)
- Majestic (Evolution, 1979)
- The Journey (Revelation) (Revelation, 2008)
- Venus (Eclipse, 2011)

=== Bill Justis ===
- "Raunchy" (1957), No. 2 US, No. 24 UK, No. 1 R&B

== K ==
=== Kinks ===
- "Revenge", from the (Kinks album, 1964)

=== King Crimson ===
- "Larks' Tongues in Aspic":
  - Part I (Larks' Tongues in Aspic, 1973)
  - Part II (Larks' Tongues in Aspic)
  - Part III (Three of a Perfect Pair, 1984)
  - Part IV (the construKction of light, 2000)
- "Red" (Red (King Crimson album), 1974)
- "Providence" (Red (King Crimson album), 1974)
- "Asbury Park" (USA, 1975)
- "The Sheltering Sky" (Discipline, 1981)
- "Discipline" (Discipline)
- "VROOOM" (Thrak, 1995)

=== Kiss ===
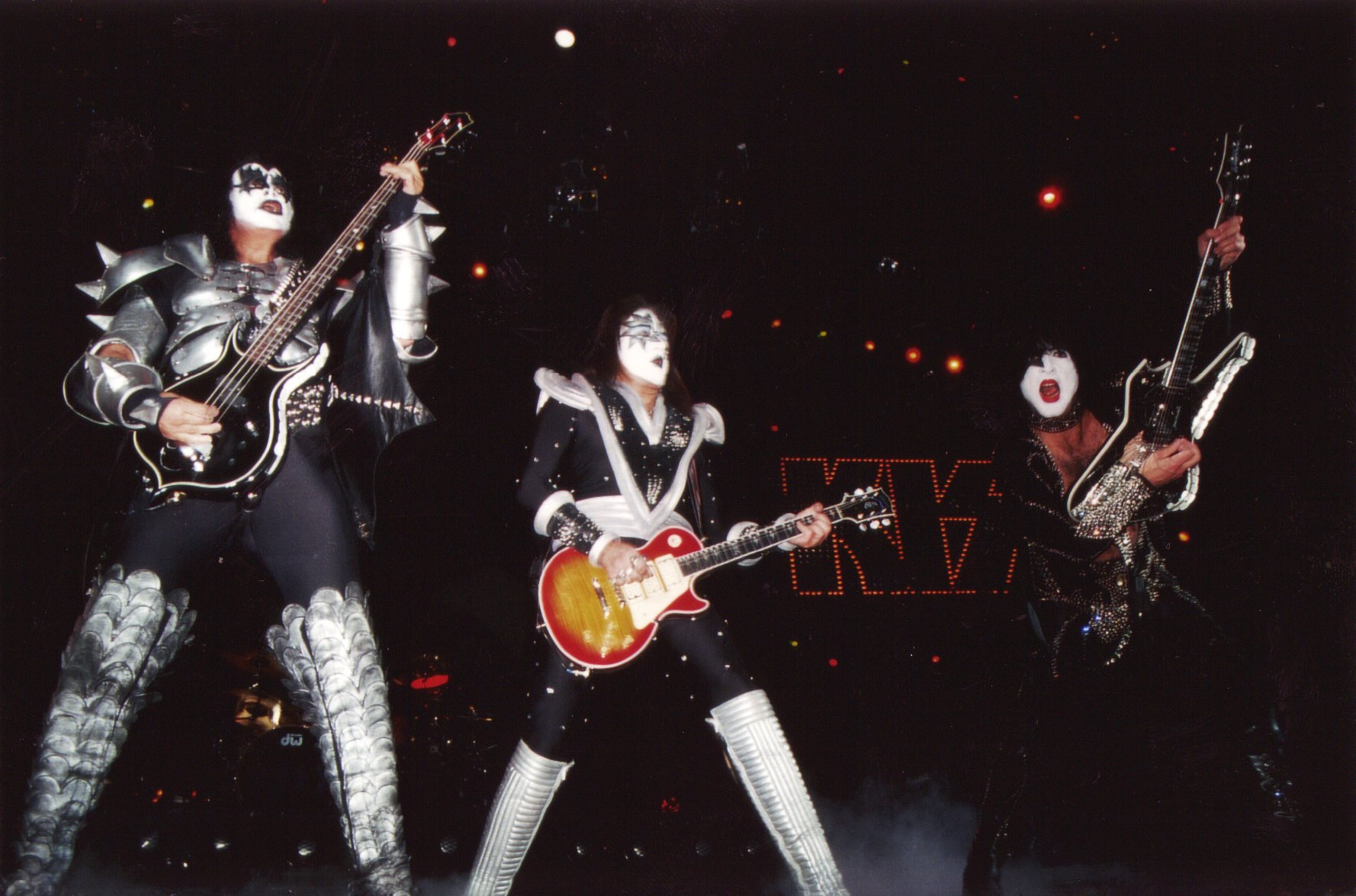
Kiss performing in Paris on March 21, 1999

- "Love Theme from Kiss" (Kiss, 1974)
- "Acrobat" (The Box Set, 2001)

=== Mark Knopfler ===
- Local Hero (1983) except "The Way It Always Starts"
- Cal (1984)
- Comfort and Joy (1984)
- The Princess Bride (1987) except "Storybook Love"
- Last Exit to Brooklyn (1989) except "Tralala"
- Wag the Dog (1998) except "Wag the Dog"
- Altamira (2016)

=== Kokomo ===
- "Asia Minor", (1961), No. 8 US, No. 35 UKAdopted from the Edvard Grieg, Piano Concerto in A minorand sub sequentially banned by the BBC.

== L ==
=== Laika and the Cosmonauts ===
Most, if not all, of the band's recordings are instrumentals.

=== Led Zeppelin ===
- "Black Mountain Side" (Led Zeppelin, 1969)
- "Moby Dick" (Led Zeppelin II, 1969)
- "Bron-Yr-Aur" (Physical Graffiti, 1975)
- "Bonzo's Montreux" (Coda, 1982)
- "White Summer" (Led Zeppelin Boxed Set, 1990)
- "LA Drone" (How the West Was Won, 2003)
- "La La" (Deluxe Edition reissue of Led Zeppelin II, 2014)
- "10 Ribs & All/Carrot Pod Pod" (Deluxe Edition reissue of Presence, 2015)
- "St. Tristan's Sword" (Deluxe Edition reissue of Coda, 2015)

=== Tony Levin ===
Most of Levin's solo recordings are instrumentals. Notable exceptions are "L'Abito della Sposa" from Double Espresso (2002), most of Resonator (2006) and some of its follow-up, Stick Man (2007).

=== Linkin Park ===
- "Session" (Meteora, 2003)
- "Wake" (Minutes to Midnight, 2007)
- "Tinfoil" (Living Things, 2010)
- "Drawbar" (The Hunting Party, 2014)

=== Liquid Tension Experiment ===
- Liquid Tension Experiment (1998)
- Liquid Tension Experiment 2 (1999)
- Liquid Tension Experiment 3 (2021)

=== Liquid Trio Experiment ===
- Spontaneous Combustion (2007)
- When the Keyboard Breaks: Live in Chicago (2009)

=== The Lively Ones ===
Most, if not all, of the band's recordings are instrumentals in the surf music genre.

=== Kiko Loureiro ===
- "No Gravity" (2005)
- "Universo Inverso" (2006)
- "Fullblast" (2009)
- "Sounds of Innocence" (2012)
- "Open Source" (2020)

=== The Love Unlimited Orchestra ===
- "Love's Theme", (1973), No. 1 US, No. 10 UK, No. 10 R&B orchestra formed and song written by Barry White

== M ==
=== Lonnie Mack ===
- "Memphis", (1963), No. 5 US, No. 4 R&B

=== Madness ===
- "The Return of the Los Palmas 7" (Absolutely, 1980)

=== Magna Carta Cartel (MCC) ===
- "Mayfire" (The Demon King, 2017)
- "So Long" (Goodmorning Restrained, 2009)
- "Sunsettlers" (Goodmorning Restrained)

=== Taj Mahal ===
- "Ain't Gwine to Whistle Dixie (Any Mo')", (The Real Thing, 1971)

=== Tak Matsumoto ===
- "Little Wing" (live-only)

=== Yngwie Malmsteen ===
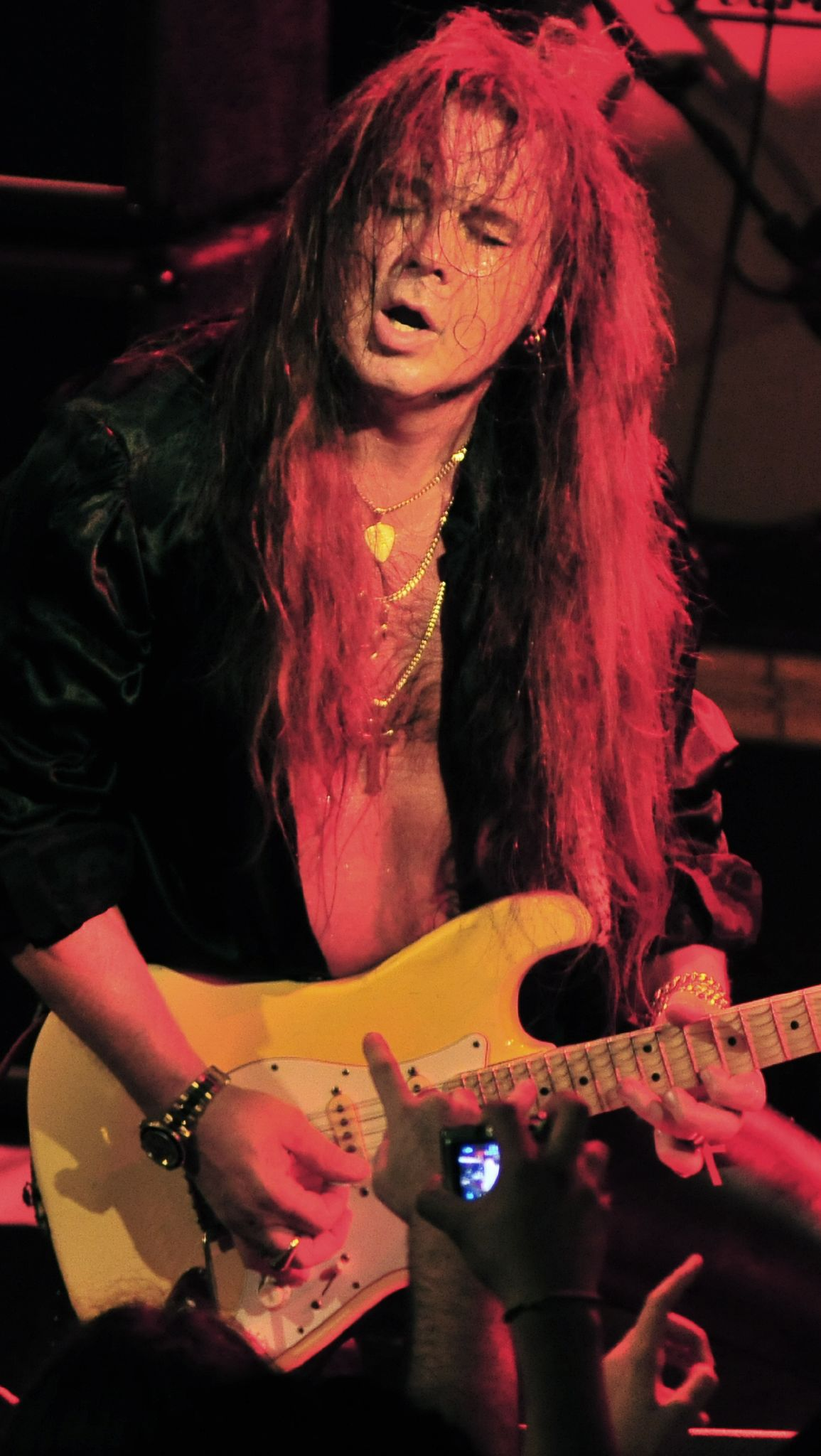
Yngwie Malmsteen.

- Concerto Suite for Electric Guitar and Orchestra in E-flat minor, Op. 1 (1998)
- Angels of Love (2009)
- Spellbound (2012) except for "Repent", "Let Sleeping Dogs Lie", "Poisoned Minds"

=== Manfred Mann ===
- "Sack O' Woe" and "Mr. Anello" (The Five Faces of Manfred Mann 1964)
- Instrumental Asylum, EP, (1966)
- Instrumental Assassination, EP, (1966)

=== Manfred Mann's Earth Band ===
- "Pluto, the Dog" (Solar Fire, 1973)
- "Countdown" (Nightingales and Bombers, 1975)
- "Crossfade" (Nightingales and Bombers)
- "As Above, So Below" (Nightingales and Bombers)
- "Waiter, There's a Yawn in My Ear" (The Roaring Silence, 1976)
- "Platform End" (Angel Station, 1979)
- "Fritz the Blank" (Chance, 1980)

=== The Mar-Keys ===
- "Last Night", (1961), No. 3 US, No. 2 R&B

=== The Marketts ===
- "Out of Limits", (1963), No. 3 US

=== Hank Marvin ===
- Guitar Man (2007)

=== Hugh Masekela ===
- "Grazing in the Grass", (1968), No. 1 US, No. 1 R&B

=== Dave Matthews Band ===
- "#34" (Under the Table and Dreaming, 1994)
- "Anyone Seen the Bridge?" (live-only)

=== Mastodon ===
- "Elephant Man" (Remission, 2002)
- "Joseph Merrick" (Leviathan, 2004)
- "Bladecatcher" (Blood Mountain, 2006)
- Jonah Hex: Revenge Gets Ugly EP, 2010

=== Brian May ===
- Furia (2000) except "Dream of Thee"

=== John Mayall & the Bluesbreakers ===
- "Hideaway" (Blues Breakers with Eric Clapton, 1966)
- "Steppin' Out" (Blues Breakers with Eric Clapton)
- "The Stumble", (A Hard Road, 1967)
- "The Supernatural", (A Hard Road)

=== Paul McCartney (and Wings) ===
- The Family Way (1967)
- "Singalong Junk" (McCartney, 1970)
- "Valentine Day" (McCartney, 1970)
- "Hot As Sun / Glasses" (McCartney, 1970)
- "Momma Miss America" (McCartney, 1970)
- "Kreen-Akrore" (McCartney, 1970)
- "Bip Bop Link" (Wild Life, 1971)
- "Mumbo Link" (Wild Life, 1971)
- "Sunshine Sometime" (Bonus track on "Ram", 1971)
- "Great Cock and Seagull Race" (Bonus track on "Ram", 1971)
- "Loup (1st Indian on the Moon)" (Red Rose Speedway, 1973)
- "Jazz Street" (Bonus track on Red Rose Speedway, 1973)
- "Night Out" (Bonus track on Red Rose Speedway, 1973)
- "Zoo Gang" (UK B-side of "Band on the Run", 1974)
- "Lunch Box / Odd Sox" (Bonus track on Venus And Mars, 1975)
- Thrillington (1977)
- "Cuff Link" (London Town, 1978)
- "Rockestra Theme" (Back to the Egg, 1979)
- "Front Parlour" (McCartney II, 1980)
- "Frozen Jap" (McCartney II, 1980)
- "Bogey Wobble" (Bonus track on McCartney II, 1980)
- "Hey Hey" (Pipes of Peace, 1983)
- "Robbie's Bit (Thanks Chet)" (Paul Is Live, 1993)
- Strawberries Oceans Ships Forest (As "The Fireman", 1993)
- Standing Stone (1997)
- Rushes (As [The Fireman (band)|The Fireman], 1998)
- Working Classical (1999)
- Ecce Cor Meum (2006)
- Ocean's Kingdom (2011)

=== Van McCoy ===
- "The Hustle", (1975), No. 1 US, No. 3 UK, No. 1 R&B

=== Meshuggah ===
- "Acrid Placidity" (Destroy Erase Improve, 1995)

=== Metallica ===
- "(Anesthesia) – Pulling Teeth" (Kill 'Em All, 1983)
- "The Call of Ktulu" (Ride the Lightning, 1984)
- "Orion" (Master of Puppets, 1986)
- "To Live Is to Die" (...And Justice for All, 1988)
- "The Ecstasy of Gold" (S&M, 1999); (We All Love Ennio Morricone, 2007)
- "Suicide & Redemption" (Death Magnetic, 2008)

=== The Meters ===
- Most of the material released under their name is instrumental.
- The Meters (1969)
- Look-Ka Py Py (1969)
- Struttin' (1970)
- Cabbage Alley (1972)
- Rejuvenation (1974)
- Fire on the Bayou (1975)
- Trick Bag (1976)
- New Directions (1977)

=== MFSB ===
- "TSOP (The Sound of Philadelphia)", (1974), No. 1 US, No. 22 UK, No. 1 R&B

=== Midnight Oil ===
- "Wedding Cake Island" (Bird Noises, 1980)
- "Bakerman" (Red Sails in the Sunset, 1984)
- "A Crocodile Cries" (Capricornia, 2001)

=== Moby Grape ===
- The "Grape Jam" album of the Wow/Grape Jam two-album set is largely instrumental, featuring guest artists Mike Bloomfield and Al Kooper

=== Mogwai ===
Most, if not all, of Mogwai's recordings are instrumentals.

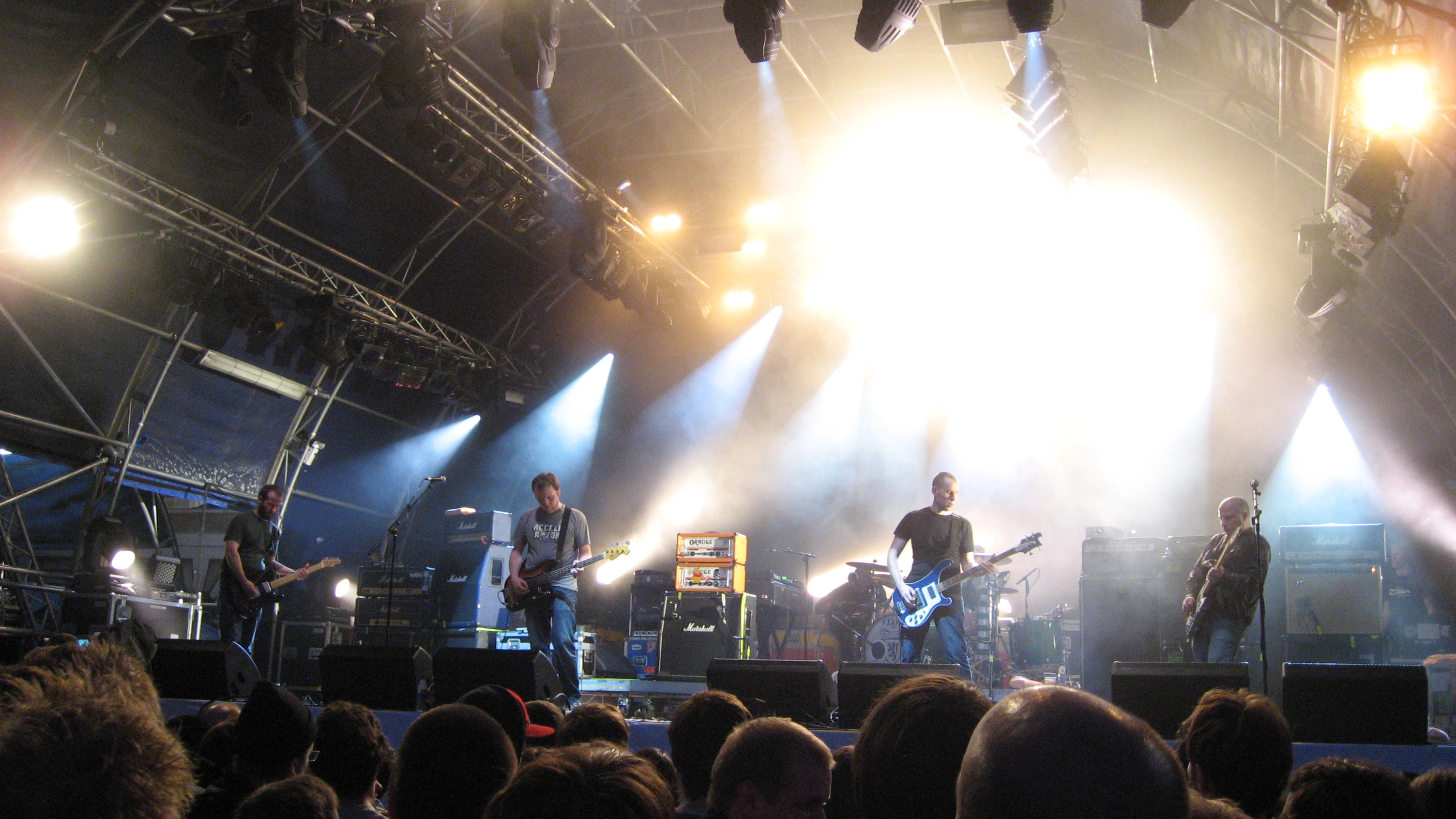
Mogwai.

- "Summer"/"Ithica 27 Φ 9" (1996)
- "New Paths to Helicon, Parts 1 and 2" (1997)
- "Superheroes of BMX" (4 Satin EP, 1997)
- "Like Herod" (Mogwai Young Team, 1997)
- "Mogwai Fear Satan" (Mogwai Young Team)
- "Christmas Steps" (Come on Die Young)

=== Mono ===
Most, if not all, of the band's recordings are instrumentals.

=== Vinnie Moore ===
Most, if not all, of Moore's recordings are instrumentals.

=== Van Morrison ===
- "Scandinavia" (Beautiful Vision, 1982)

=== Steve Morse Band ===
Most, if not all, of the band's recordings are instrumentals.

=== Walter Murphy ===
- "A Fifth of Beethoven", (1976), No. 1 US, No. 28 UK, No. 10 R&B, based on the first movement of Ludwig van Beethoven's Fifth Symphony

=== Muse ===
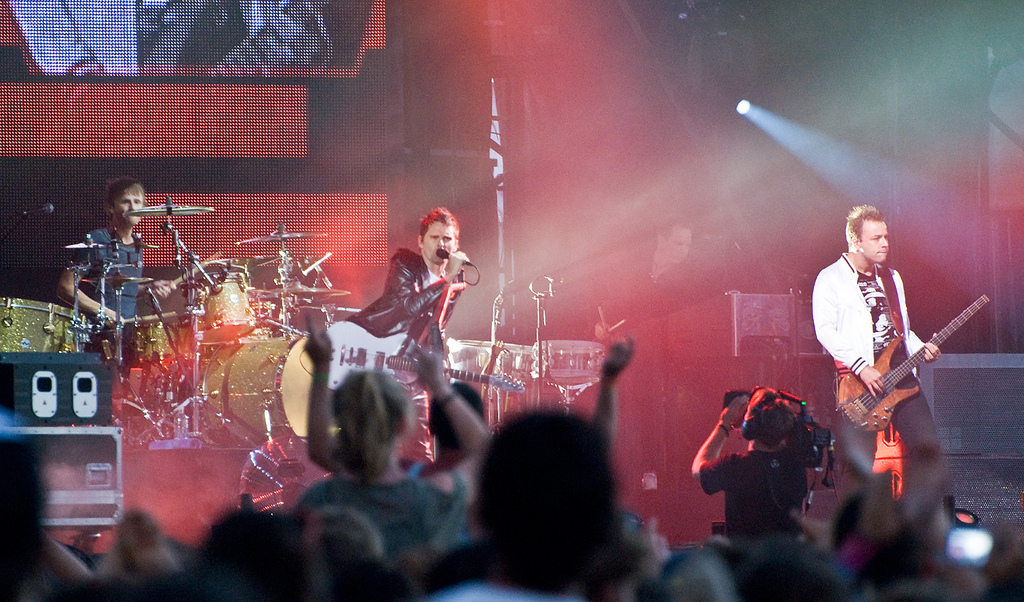
Muse.

- "Popcorn" (B-side to "Resistance", 2009)

== N ==
=== Sandy Nelson ===
- Most, if not all, of Sandy Nelson's recordings are instrumentals.
- "Teen Beat" (1959), No. 4 US, No. 9 UK, No. 17 R&B, The piano on the recording is by Bruce Johnston.
- "Drums Are My Beat" (1962), No. 29 US, No. 30 UK

=== New Order ===
- "Elegia" (Low-Life, 1985)

=== Jack Nietzsche ===
- "The Lonely Surfer", (1963), No. 39 US

=== Nine Inch Nails ===
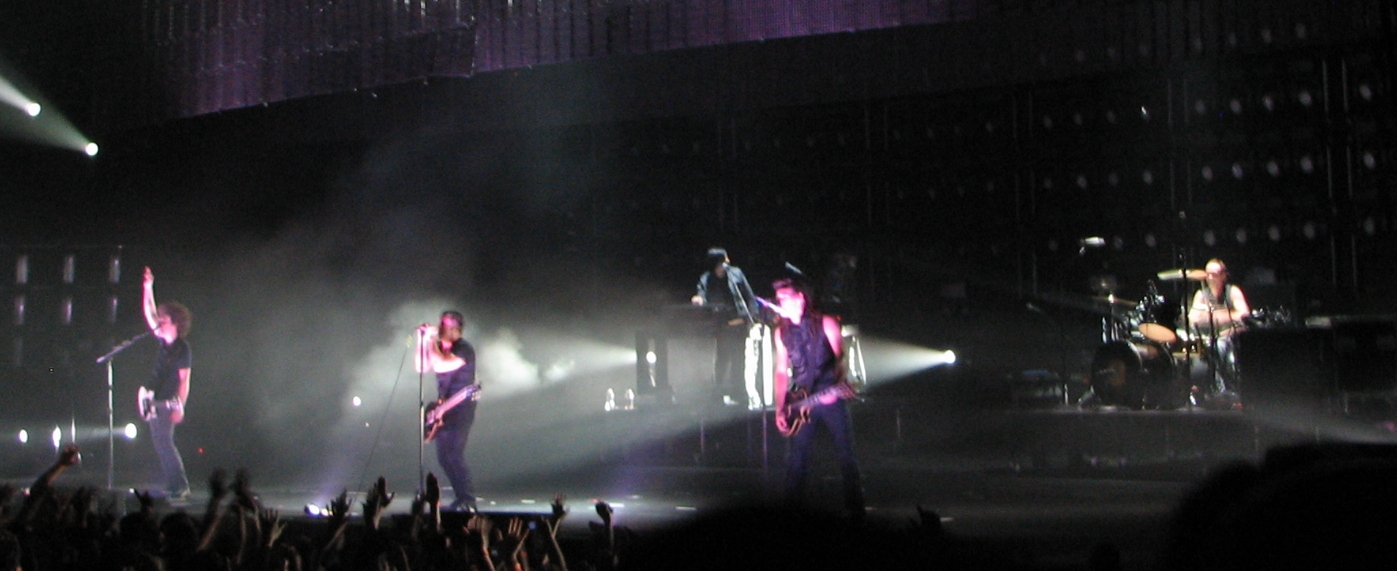
Nine Inch Nails.

- "Just Like You Imagined" (The Fragile)
- Ghosts I–IV (2008)

=== Cliff Nobles and Co. ===
- "The Horse", (1968), No. 2 US, No. 2 UK, No. 2 R&B

=== Ted Nugent ===
- "Home Bound" (Cat Scratch Fever, 1977)

== O ==
=== The Offspring ===
- "In the Hall of the Mountain King" (Let the Bad Times Roll, 2021)

=== Ozzy Osbourne ===
- "Dee" (Blizzard of Ozz, 1980)

=== Ozric Tentacles ===
Most of if not all of their albums consist of instrumentals.

== P ==
=== Jimmy Page ===
- "Outrider" (1988)

=== The Alan Parsons Project ===
- "Dream Within a Dream" (Tales of Mystery and Imagination, 1976)
- "The Fall of the Usher House" (Tales of Mystery and Imagination, 1976)
- "I Robot" (I Robot, 1977)
- "Nucleus" (I Robot, 1977)
- "Total Eclipse" (I Robot, 1977)
- "Genesis Ch.1 V32" (I Robot, 1977)
- "Voyager" (Pyramid, 1978)
- "In the Lap of the Gods" (Pyramid, 1978)
- "Hyper Gamma Spaces" (Pyramid, 1978)
- "Lucifer" (Eve, 1979)
- "Secret Garden" (Eve, 1979)
- "The Gold Bug" (The Turn of a Friendly Card, 1980)
- "The Ace of Swords" (The Turn of a Friendly Card, 1980)
- "Sirius" (Eye in the Sky, 1982)
- "Mammagamma" (Eye in the Sky, 1982)
- "Pipeline" (Ammonia Avenue, 1984)
- "Hawkeye" (Vulture Culture, 1985)
- "Beaujolais" (Stereotomy, 1986)
- "Where's the Walrus?" (Stereotomy, 1986)
- "Chinese Whispers" (Stereotomy, 1986)
- "Paseo De Gracia" (Gaudi, 1987)

=== Particle ===
Most, if not all, of the band's recordings are instrumentals.

=== Pell Mell ===
Most, if not all, of the band's recordings are instrumentals.

=== Joe Perry ===
- "Mercy" (Joe Perry, 2005)
- "Twilight" (Joe Perry, 2005)
- "Wooden Ships" (Have Guitar, Will Travel, 2009)
- "Rumble in the Jungle" (Sweetzerland Manifesto, 2018)
- "Spanish Sushi" (Sweetzerland Manifesto, 2018)

=== The Joe Perry Project ===
- "Break Song" (Let the Music Do the Talking, 1980)

=== John Petrucci ===
- An Evening with John Petrucci and Jordan Rudess (2004)
- Suspended Animation (2005)
- Terminal Velocity (2020)

=== Phish ===
- "The Divided Sky" (Junta, 1989)
- "The Oh Kee Pa Ceremony" (Lawn Boy, 1990)
- "Eliza" (A Picture of Nectar, 1992)
- "Magilla" (A Picture of Nectar)
- "The Landlady" (A Picture of Nectar)
- "Faht" (A Picture of Nectar)
- "All Things Reconsidered" (Rift, 1993)
- "Cars Trucks Buses" (Billy Breathes, 1996)
- "Bliss" (Billy Breathes)
- The Siket Disc (1999)
- "The Inlaw Josie Wales" (Farmhouse, 2000)
- "Maggie's Revenge" (Undermind, 2004)
- Headphones Jam (2007)

=== Pink Floyd ===
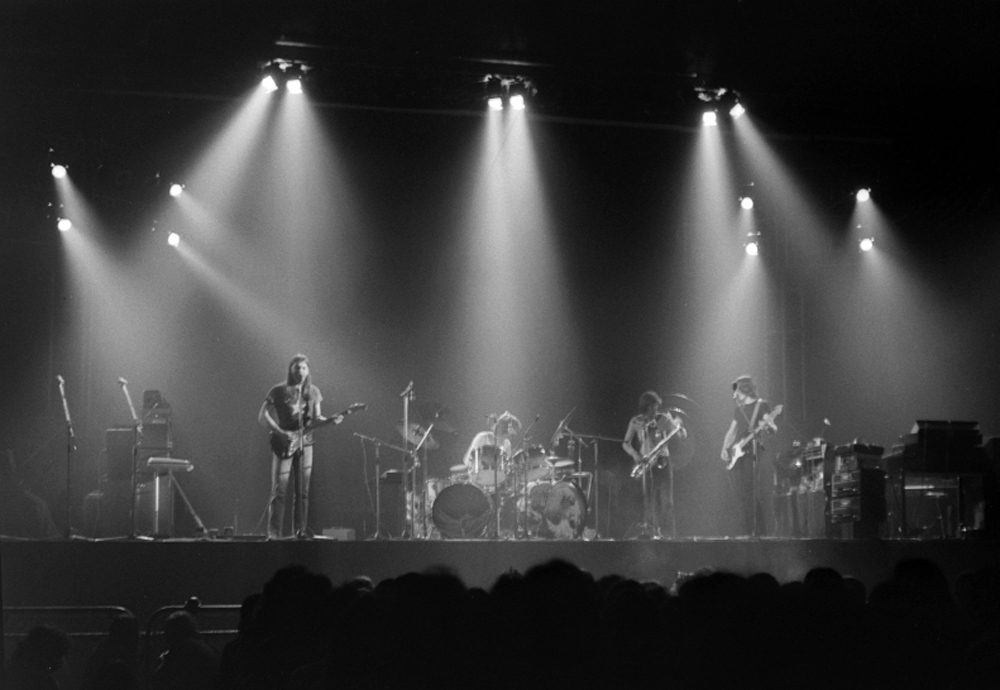

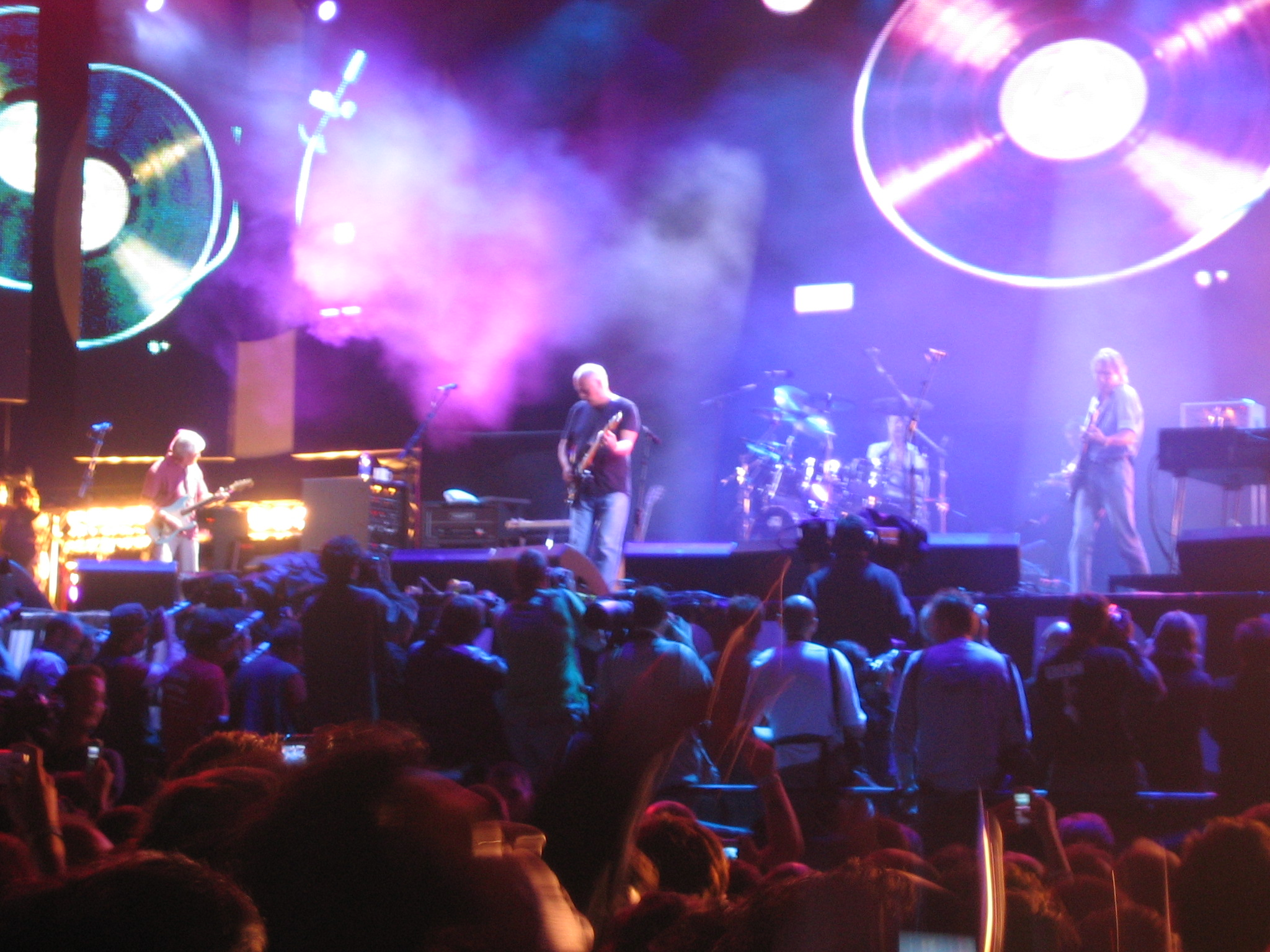
Pink Floyd in 1973 (top) and 2005 (above).

- "Pow R. Toc H." (The Piper at the Gates of Dawn, 1967)
- "Interstellar Overdrive" (The Piper at the Gates of Dawn)
- "A Saucerful of Secrets" (A Saucerful of Secrets, 1968)
- "Up the Khyber" (Soundtrack from the Film More, 1969)
- "Party Sequence" (Soundtrack from the Film More)
- "Main Theme" (Soundtrack from the Film More)
- "More Blues" (Soundtrack from the Film More)
- "Quicksilver" (Soundtrack from the Film More)
- "A Spanish Piece" (Soundtrack from the Film More)
- "Dramatic Theme" (Soundtrack from the Film More)
- "Several Species of Small Furry Animals Gathered Together in a Cave and Grooving with a Pict" (Ummagumma)
- "The Grand Vizier's Garden Party (Parts I-III)" (Ummagumma)
- "Heart Beat, Pig Meat" (Zabriskie Point, 1970)
- "Come in Number 51, Your Time Is Up" (Zabriskie Point)
- "Atom Heart Mother" (Atom Heart Mother, 1970)
- "Alan's Psychedelic Breakfast" (Atom Heart Mother)
- "One of These Days" (Meddle, 1971)
- "Obscured by Clouds" (Obscured by Clouds, 1972)
- "When You're In" (Obscured by Clouds)
- "Mudmen" (Obscured by Clouds)
- "Absolutely Curtains" (Obscured by Clouds)
- "Speak to Me" (The Dark Side of the Moon, 1973)
- "On the Run" (The Dark Side of the Moon)
- "Any Colour You Like" (The Dark Side of the Moon)
- "Shine on You Crazy Diamond pts. I, II, III, V, VI, VIII, IX" (Wish You Were Here, 1975)
- "Signs of Life" (A Momentary Lapse of Reason, 1987)
- "Round and Around" (A Momentary Lapse of Reason)
- "Terminal Frost" (A Momentary Lapse of Reason)
- "Cluster One" (The Division Bell, 1994)
- "Marooned" (The Division Bell)
- "Unknown Song" (bonus track on Zabriskie Point reissue, 1997)
- "The Last Few Bricks" (Is There Anybody Out There? The Wall Live 1980–81, 2000)
- The Endless River (2014) except "Louder than Words"
- The Endless River (2014) (bonus tracks on Deluxe edition DVD/Blu-ray)

=== Pivot ===
Most, if not all, of the band's recordings are instrumentals.

=== Chris Poland ===
- Return to Metalopolis (1990)

=== The Police ===
- "Reggatta de Blanc" (Reggatta de Blanc, 1979)
- "Behind My Camel" (Zenyatta Mondatta, 1980)
- "The Other Way of Stopping" (Zenyatta Mondatta, 1980)
- "Chambelle" (B-side, 1981)

=== Porcupine Tree ===
- "Wedding Nails" (In Absentia, 2002)

=== Billy Preston ===
- "Outa-Space", (1971), No. 2 US, No. 1 UK, No. 44 R&B
- "Space Race", (1973), No. 4 US, No. 1 R&B

=== The Pyramids ===
- "Penetration", (1964), No. 18 US, adopted from Edvard Grieg's Piano Concerto in A minor

== Q ==
=== Queen ===
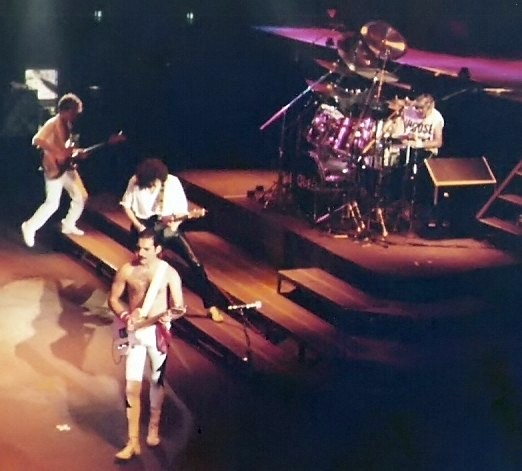
Queen in 1984.

- "Seven Seas of Rhye" (Queen, 1973)
- "Procession" (Queen II, 1974)
- "God Save The Queen" (A Night At The Opera, 1975)
- A Dozen Red Roses For My Darling ("A Kind Of Magic" single B-side, 1986)
- "Forever" (A Kind Of Magic, 1986)
- "Chinese Torture" (The Miracle, 1989)
- "Track 13" (Made In Heaven, 1995)

=== Quiet Sun ===
- Mainstream, (1975)

== R ==
=== Rainbow ===
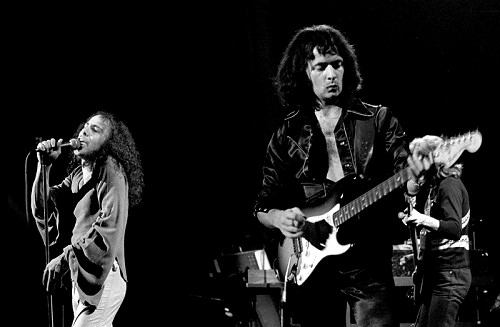
Rainbow in 1977.

- "Still I'm Sad" (Ritchie Blackmore's Rainbow, 1975)
- "Weiss Heim" ("All Night Long" single B-side, 1980)
- "Vielleicht Das Nächste Mal" (Difficult to Cure, 1981)
- "Difficult to Cure" (Difficult to Cure, 1981)
- "Anybody There" (Bent Out of Shape, 1983)
- "Snowman" (Bent Out of Shape, 1983)

=== Ramones ===
- "Durango 95" (Too Tough to Die, 1984)

=== Red Hot Chili Peppers ===
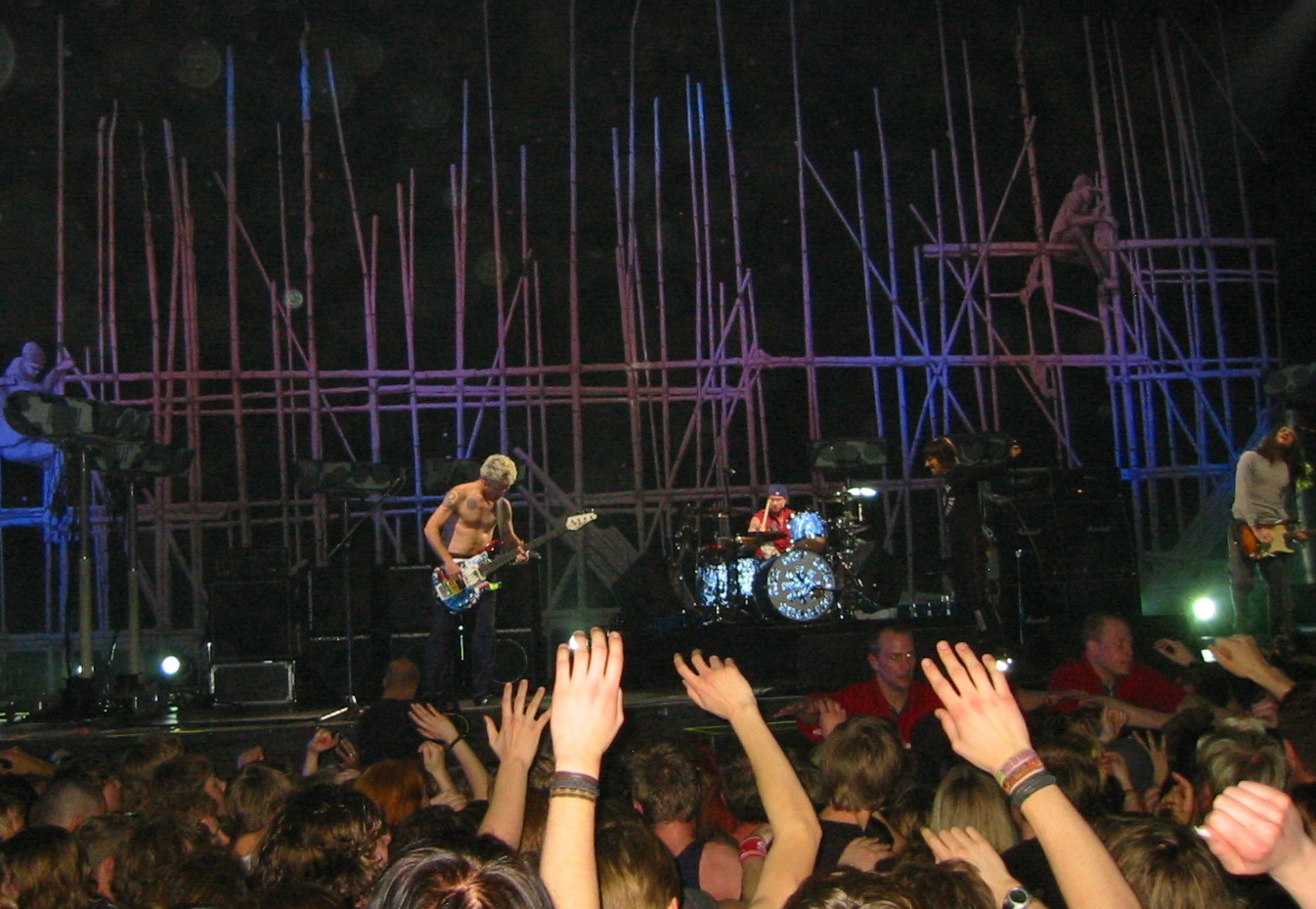
Red Hot Chili Peppers.

- "Behind the Sun (Instrumental Demo)" (bonus track on The Uplift Mofo Party Plan reissue, 2003)
- "Me & My Friends (Instrumental Demo)" (bonus track on The Uplift Mofo Party Plan reissue)

=== Red Sparowes ===
Most, if not all, of the band's recordings are instrumentals.

=== Rhythm Heritage ===
- "Theme from S.W.A.T.", (1976), No. 1 US, No. 11 R&B

=== Rockin' Rebels, aka The Rebels ===
- "Wild Weekend", (1963), No. 8 US, No. 3 UK, No. 28 R&B

=== Rodrigo y Gabriela ===
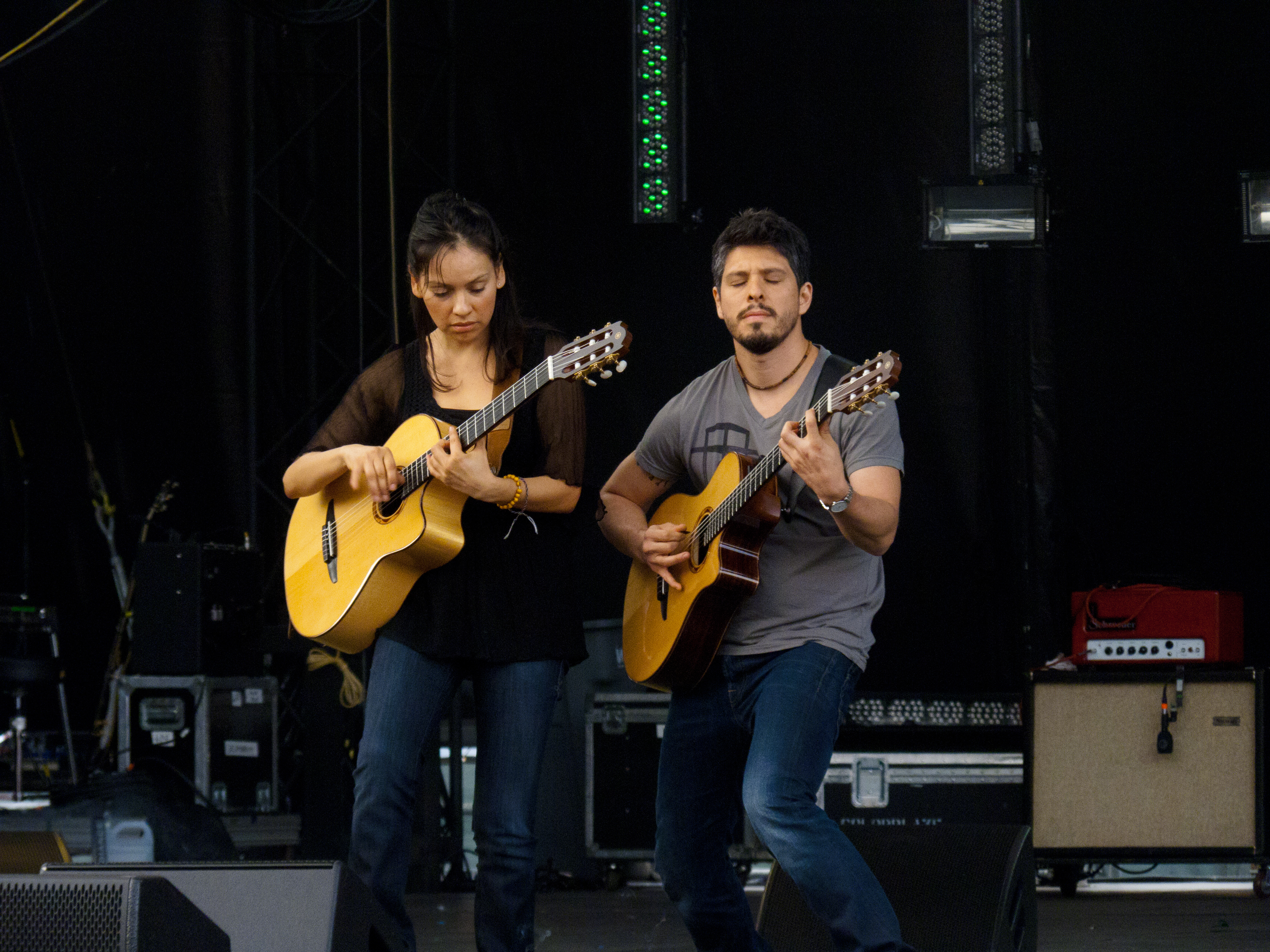
Gabriela Quintero y Rodrigo Sánchez in Washington State on 30 May 2011

- Re-Foc (2002)
- Rodrigo y Gabriela (2006)
- 11:11 (2009)
- Area 52 (2012)
- 9 Dead Alive (2014)

=== The Rolling Stones ===
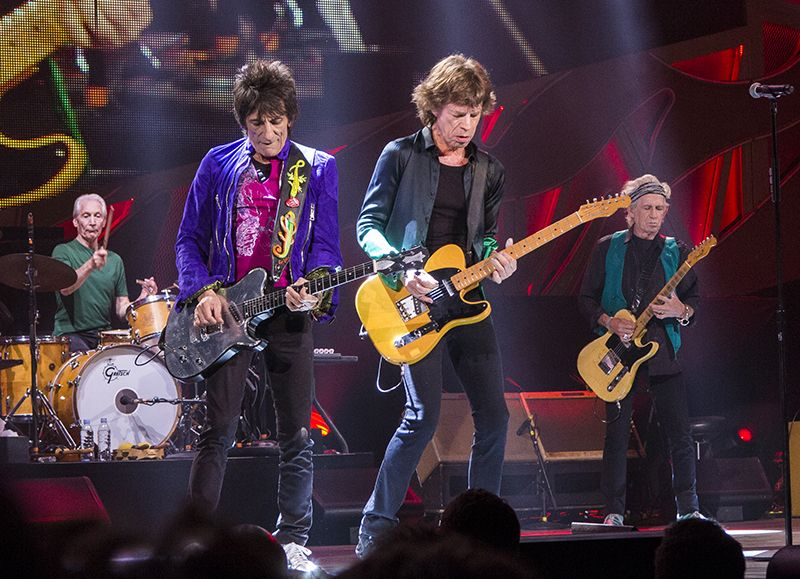
The Rolling Stones in Milwaukee in 2015

- "Now I've Got a Witness" (The Rolling Stones (album), 1964)
- "2120 South Michigan Avenue" (UK release Five by Five EP/US release 12 X 5, 1964)
- "Potted Shrimp" (studio outtake recorded in 1970)

=== Jordan Rudess ===
- Arrival (1988)
- Listen (1993)
- Secrets of the Muse (1997)
- Resonance (1999)
- An Evening with John Petrucci and Jordan Rudess (2004)
- Feeding the Wheel (2001)
- 4NYC (2002)
- Christmas Sky (2002)
- Rhythm of Time (2004)
- The Road Home (2007)
- Notes on a Dream (2009)
- All That Is Now (2013)
- Explorations (2014)
- The Unforgotten Path (2015)
- Wired for Madness (2019)
- Heartfelt (2019)
- A Chapter In Time (2021)
- Rockestra (2021)

=== Rush ===
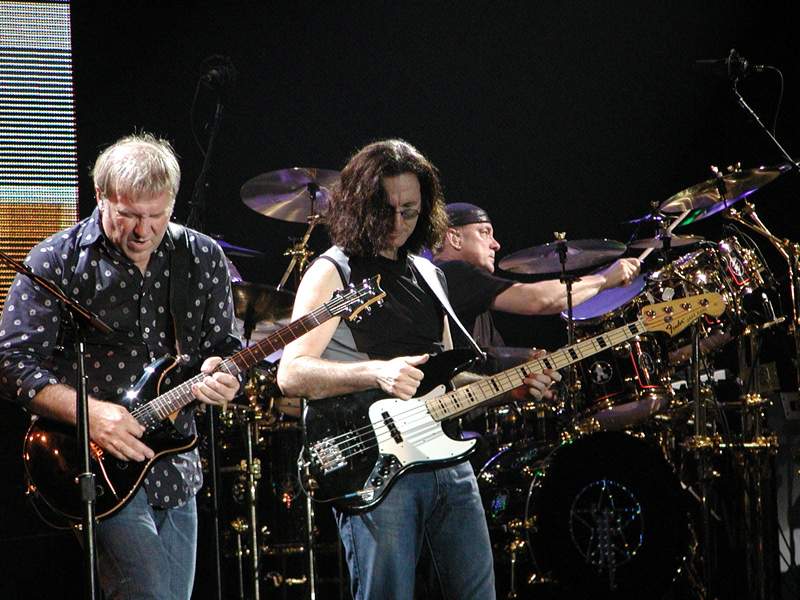
Rush.

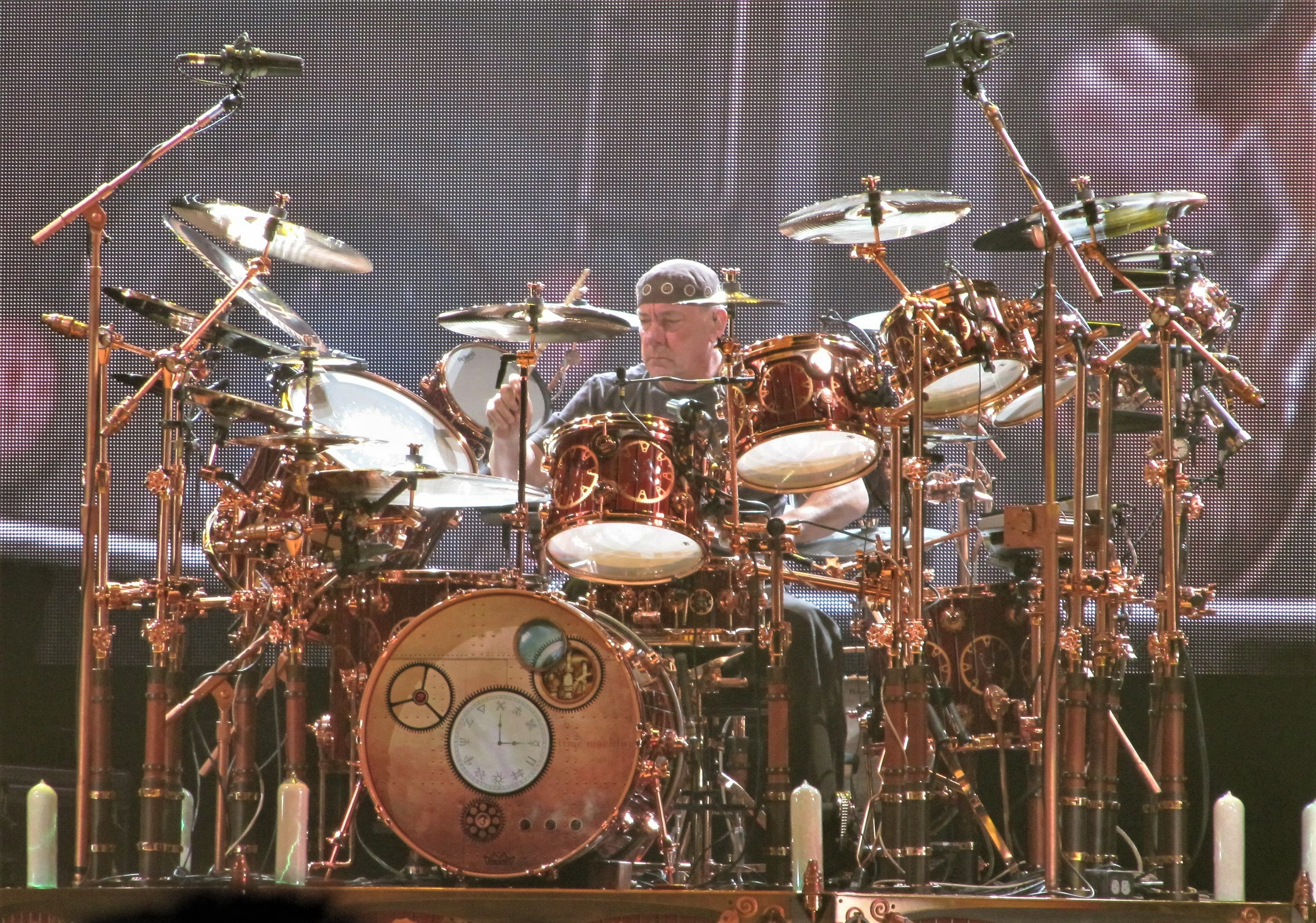
Neil Peart drumming.

- "2112 - I: Overture" (2112, 1976)
- "Cygnus X-1, Book I: Prologue" (A Farewell To Kings, 1977)
- "La Villa Strangiato" (Hemispheres, 1978)
- "YYZ" (Moving Pictures, 1981)
- "Broon's Bane" (Exit...Stage Left, 1981)
- "Leave That Thing Alone" (Counterparts, 1993)
- "Limbo" (Test for Echo, 1996)
- "Cygnus X-1" (Rush in Rio, 2003)
- "The Main Monkey Business" (Snakes & Arrows, 2007)
- "Hope" (Snakes & Arrows)
- "Malignant Narcissism" (Snakes & Arrows)

== S ==
=== Santana ===
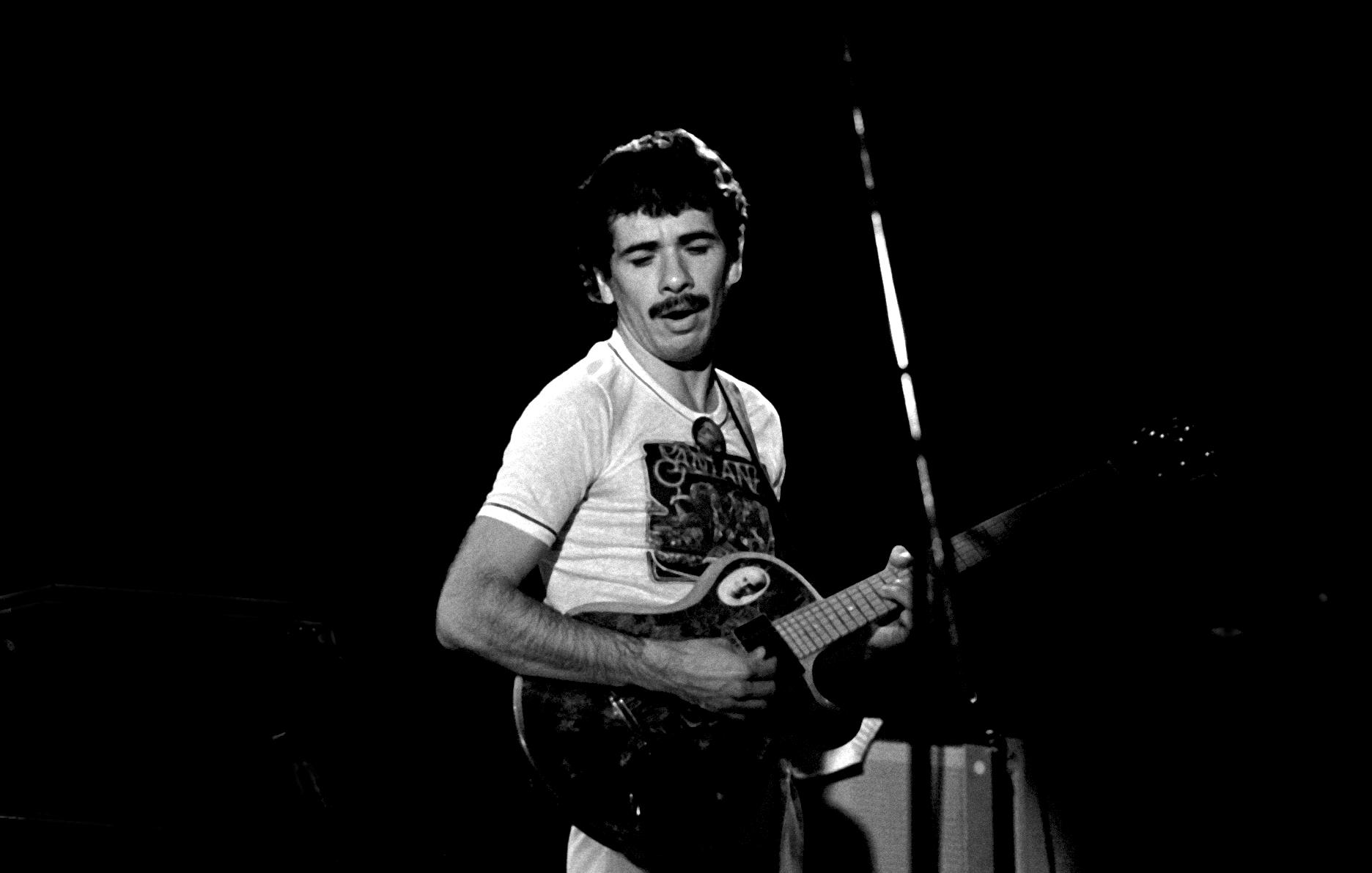
Carlos Santana in 1973.

- "Soul Sacrifice" (Santana)
- "Samba Pa Ti" (Santana)
- "Incident at Neshabur" (Abraxas)
- "In a Silent Way" (Fillmore: The Last Days, 1972)
- "Europa (Earth's Cry Heaven's Smile)" (Amigos, 1976)
- "Jugando" (Festival, 1977)
- "Verão Vermelho" (Festival)
- "Revelations" (Festival)

=== Carlos Santana ===
- Blues for Salvador (1987)

=== Santo and Johnny ===
Most, if not all, of Santo & Johnny's recordings are instrumentals.

- "Sleep Walk" (Santo & Johnny, 1959), No. 1 US, No. 22 UK, No. 4 R&B
- "Tear Drop", (1959), No. 23 US, No. 50 UK, No. 17 R&B

=== Joe Satriani ===
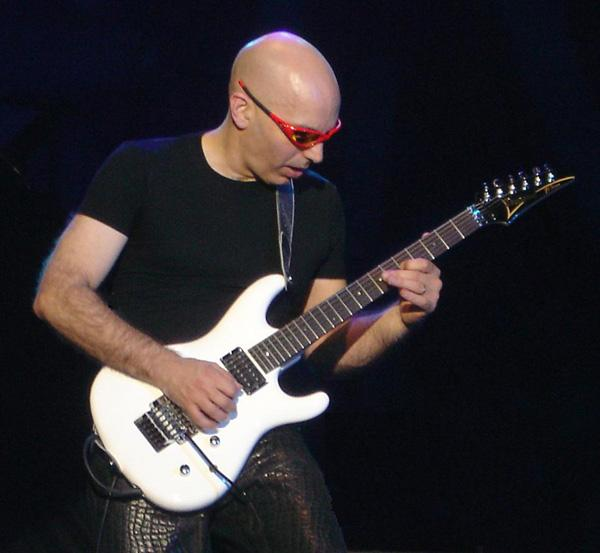
Joe Satriani.

Albums:

- Not of This Earth (1986)
- Surfing with the Alien (1987)
- Dreaming No. 11 (1988)
- Flying in a Blue Dream (1989)
- The Extremist (1992)
- Time Machine (1993)
- Joe Satriani (1995)
- Crystal Planet (1998)
- Engines of Creation (2000)
- Strange Beautiful Music (2002)
- Is There Love in Space? (2004)
- Super Colossal (2006)
- Professor Satchafunkilus and the Musterion of Rock (2008)
- Black Swans and Wormhole Wizards (2010)
- Unstoppable Momentum (2013)
- Shockwave Supernova (2015)
- What Happens Next (2018)
- Shapeshifting (2020)
- When Trees Walked The Earth (Song) (2020)
- The Elephants of Mars (2022)

=== Savatage ===
- "Christmas Eve (Sarajevo 12/24)" (Dead Winter Dead)

=== Scorpions ===
- "Night Lights" (In Trance, 1975)
- "Coast To Coast" (Lovedrive, 1979)

=== Sepultura ===
- "Inquisition Symphony" (Schizophrenia, 1987)
- "The Abyss" (Schizophrenia, 1987)
- "Kaiowas" (Chaos A.D., 1993)
- "Jasco" (Roots, 1996)
- "Itsári" (Roots, 1996)
- "Canyon Jam" (Roots, 1996)
- "Tribus" (Against, 1998)
- "F.O.E." (Against, 1998)
- "T3rcermillenium" (Against, 1998)
- "Valtio" (Nation, 2001)
- "Enter Sandman/Fight Fire with Fire Medley" (Revolusongs, 2002)
- "Lost" (Dante XXI, 2006)
- "Limbo" (Dante XXI, 2006)
- "Eunoé" (Dante XXI, 2006)
- "Primium Mobile" (Dante XXI, 2006)
- "A-Lex I" (A-Lex, 2009)
- "A-Lex II" (A-Lex, 2009)
- "A-Lex III" (A-Lex, (2009)
- "Ludwig Van" (A-Lex, 2009)
- "A-Lex IV" (A-Lex, 2009)
- "Iceberg Dances" (Machine Messiah, 2017)
- "The Pentagram" (Quadra, 2020)
- "Quadra" (Quadra, 2020)

=== The Shadows ===
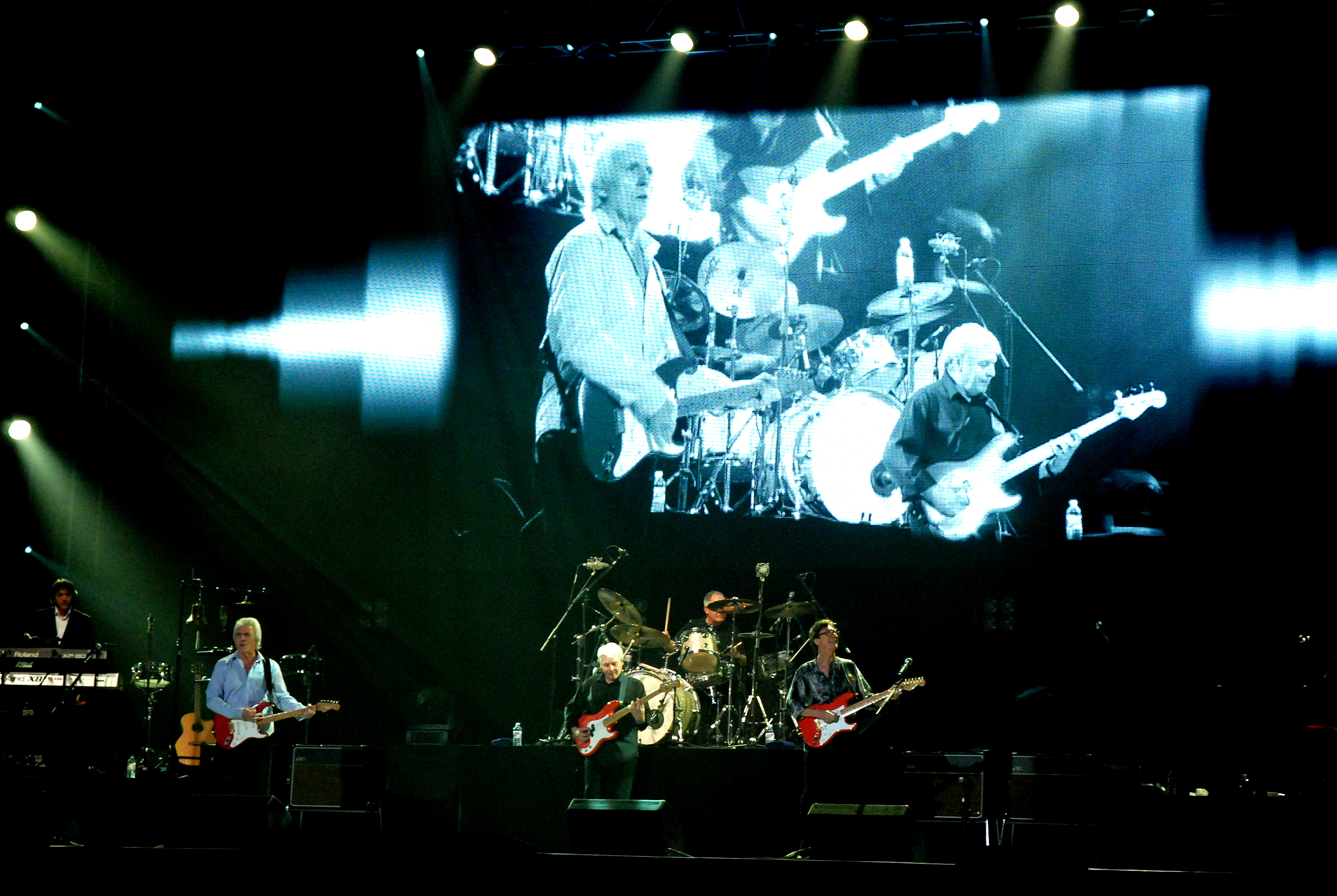
The Shadows in 2009.

A significant number of the band's recordings are instrumentals. See The Shadows discography for more details.

- "Apache" (1960)
- The Shadows EP (1961)
- "FBI"/"Midnight" (1961)
- "The Frightened City" (1961)
- "Kon-Tiki" (1961)
- "Wonderful Land" (1962)
- The Boys EP (1962)
- "Dance On!" (1962)
- "Foot Tapper" (1963)
- "Atlantis" (1963)
- "The Rise and Fall of Flingel Bunt" (1964)
- "The Warlord" (1965)
- "Maroc 7" (1967)

=== Derek Sherinian ===
- Planet X (1999)
- Inertia (2001)
- Black Utopia (2003)
- Mythology (2004)
- Blood of the Snake (2006)
- Molecular Heinosity (2009)
- The Phoenix (2020)

=== Silver Convention ===
- "Fly, Robin, Fly", (1975), No. 1 US, No. 28 UK, No. 1 R&B

=== Slade ===
- "M'Hat M'Coat" (Till Deaf Do Us Part, 1981)

=== Slayer ===
- "Delusions of Savior" (Repentless, 2015)

=== Slint ===
- Their untitled 1994 EP is composed entirely of instrumentals.

=== Sonic Youth ===
- SYR1: Anagrama EP (1997)
- SYR2: Slaapkamers Met Slagroom EP (1997)

=== Soulfly ===
- "Four Sticks" (bonus track on deluxe edition of Omen)

=== Steely Dan ===
- "East St. Louis Toodle-Oo", (Pretzel Logic, 1974), written by Duke Ellington

=== Steve Stevens ===
- Atomic Playboys (1989)
- Flamenco a Go-Go (2000)
- Memory Crash (2008)

=== Rod Stewart ===
- "I've Grown Accustomed to Her Face" (Smiler, 1974)

=== The String-A-Longs ===
- "Wheels", (1961), No. 3 US, No. 8 UK, No. 19 R&B

=== Styx ===
- "Little Fugue in G" (Styx II, 1973)

=== The Surfaris ===
- "Wipe Out" b/w Surfer Joe No. 2 US

=== Symphony X ===
- "The Odyssey: Odysseus' Theme/Overture" (The Odyssey, 2002)

== T ==
=== Tangerine Dream ===
Only three albums in this band's extensive discography contain any vocal tracks: Cyclone (1978), Tyger (1987) and Inferno (2002). Also, while the band's music does contain rock elements, it is often categorized within new-age, electronic and other genres instead.

=== Tarentel ===
Most, if not all, of the band's recordings are instrumentals.

=== The T-Bones ===
- "No Matter What Shape (Your Stomach's In)", (1965), No. 3 US

=== Therapy? ===
- "Sky High McKay(e)" (Teethgrinder single, 1992)
- "Big Cave In" (Suicide Pact - You First, 1999)
- "Magic Mountain" (Crooked Timber, 2009)
- "Marlow" (A Brief Crack of Light, 2012)

=== Timo Tolkki ===
- Classical Variations and Themes (1994)

=== The Tornados ===
Most of the band's recordings are instrumentals.

- "Telstar" (1962) No. 1 US, No. 1 UK, No. 5 R&B

=== Tortoise ===
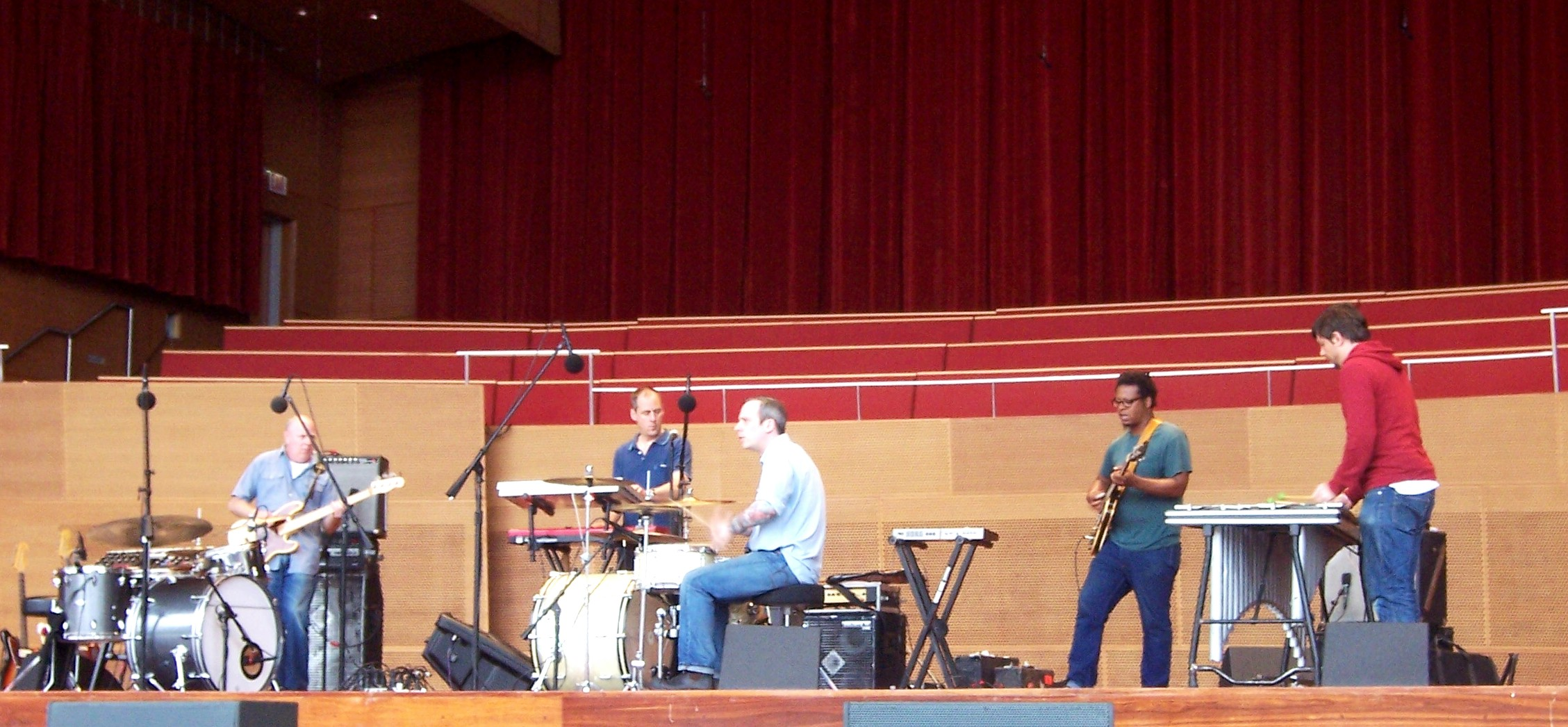
Tortoise.

Most, if not all, Tortoise recordings are instrumentals.

- Tortoise (1994)
- Millions Now Living Will Never Die (1996)
- TNT (1998)
- Standards (2001)
- It's All Around You (2004)
- Beacons of Ancestorship (2009)

=== Traffic ===
- "Glad" (John Barleycorn Must Die, 1970)

=== Trans Am ===
- Trans Am, 1996
- Surrender to the Night, 1997
- Futureworld, 1999

=== Trans-Siberian Orchestra ===
- "Christmas Eve/Sarajevo 12/24" (Christmas Eve and Other Stories)
- "Wizards in Winter" (The Lost Christmas Eve)

=== The Derek Trucks Band ===
Most of the band's early recordings, prior to their introduction of vocalist Mike Mattison, are instrumentals. Many of these recordings also veer strongly towards jazz fusion with rock elements.

== U ==
=== U2 ===
- "4th Of July" (The Unforgettable Fire, 1984)
- "Boomerang 1" (The Unforgettable Fire, 1984)

== V ==
=== Steve Vai ===
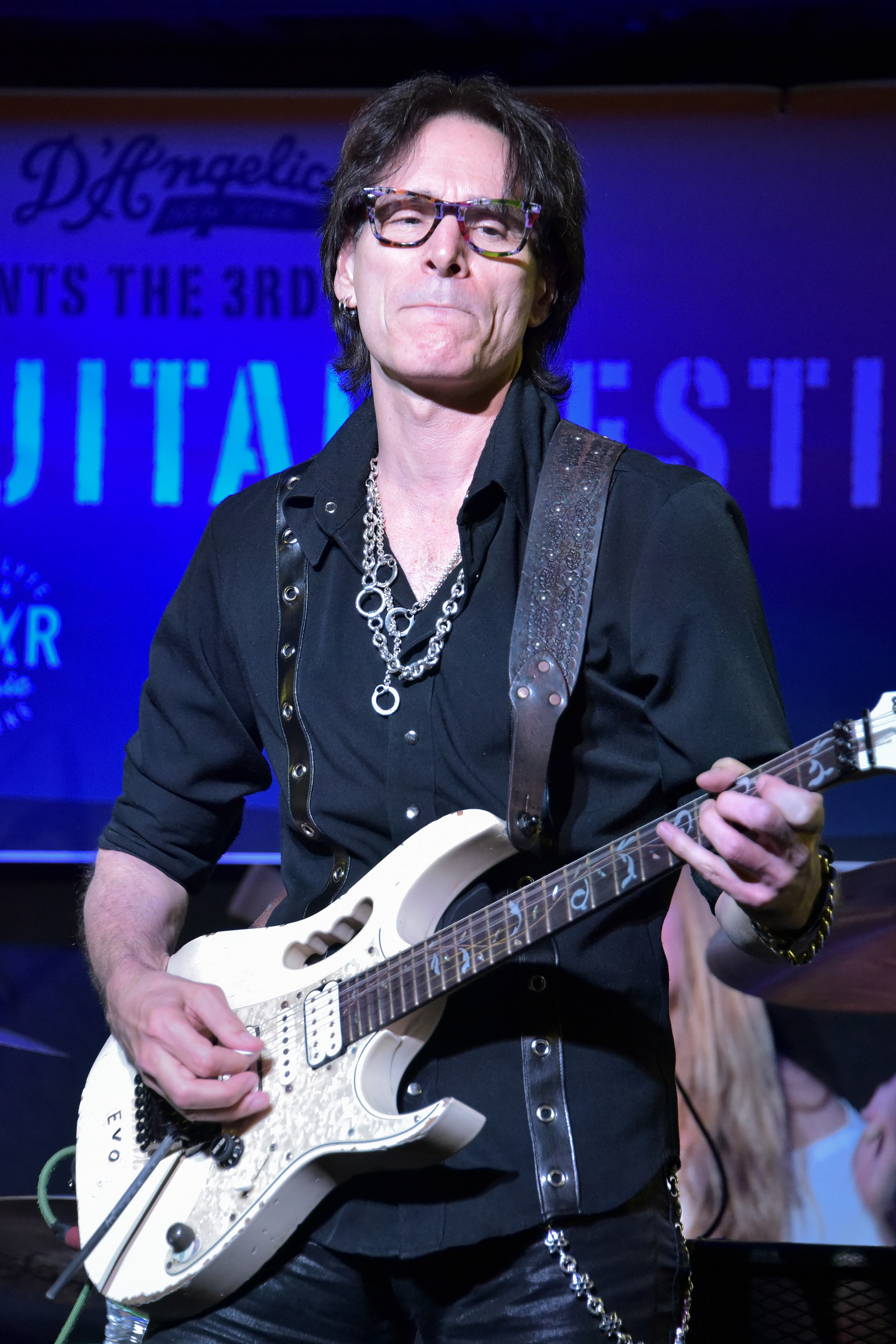
Steve Vai

- "The Attitude Song" (Flex-Able)
- Passion and Warfare (1990)
- "Sofa" (Zappa's Universe, 1993)
- Alien Love Secrets EP (1995)
- "Fire Garden" (1996)
- The Ultra Zone (1999)
- Alive In An Ultra World (2001)
- Real Illusions: Reflections (2005)
- The Story of Light (2012)
- Modern Primitive (2016)

=== Van Halen ===
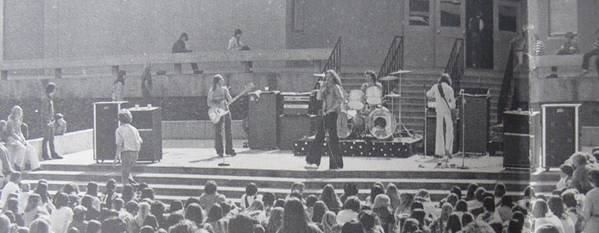
Van Halen in 1976

- "Eruption" (Van Halen, 1978)
- "Spanish Fly" (Van Halen II, 1979)
- "Sunday Afternoon in the Park" (Fair Warning, 1981)
- "Cathedral" (Diver Down, 1982)
- "Little Guitars" (Diver Down, 1982)
- "1984" (1984, 1984)
- "316" (For Unlawful Carnal Knowledge, 1991)
- "Strung Out" (Balance, 1995)
- "Doin' Time" (Balance, 1995)
- "Baluchitherium" (Balance, 1995)
- "New World" (Van Halen III, 1998)
- "Primary" (Fair Warning, 1998)

=== Eddie and Alex Van Halen ===
- "Respect the Wind" (soundtrack to Twister, 1996)

=== Stevie Ray Vaughan and Double Trouble ===
- "Rude Mood" (Texas Flood, 1983)
- "Testify" (Texas Flood)
- "Scuttle Buttin'" (Texas Flood)
- "Lenny" (Texas Flood)
- "Hide Away" (Couldn't Stand the Weather, 1984)
- "Say What!" (Soul to Soul, 1985)
- "Riviera Paradise (In Step, 1989)
- "Little Wing" (The Sky Is Crying, 1991)
- "Chitlins con Carne" (The Sky Is Crying)

=== The Ventures ===
Most, if not all, of the band's recordings are instrumentals. See The Ventures discography for more details.

=== The Virtues ===
- "Guitar Boogie Shuffle", (1963), No. 5 US, No. 27 R&B

== W ==
=== The Wailers aka The Fabulous Wailers ===
- "Tall Cool One", (1959), No. 36 US, No. 24 R&B

=== Rick Wakeman ===
- The Red Planet (2020)
- The Six Wives of Henry VIII (1973)

=== Mike Watt ===
- "Maggot Brain" (Ball-Hog or Tugboat?, 1995)

=== The Who ===
- "The Ox" (My Generation, 1965)
- "Cobwebs and Strange" (A Quick One, 1966)
- "Overture" (Tommy, 1969)
- "Sparks" (Tommy, 1969)
- "Underture" (Tommy, 1969)
- "Quadrophenia" (Quadrophenia, 1973)
- "The Rock" (Quadrophenia, 1973)
- "Hall of the Mountain King" (bonus track on The Who Sell Out reissue, 1995)
- "My Generation (Instrumental)" (bonus track on deluxe edition reissue of My Generation, 2002)

=== Mason Williams ===
- "Classical Gas" (The Mason Williams Phonograph Record, 1968), No. 2 US, No. 9 UK "orchestrated rock and roll" backed by the Wrecking Crew

=== Brian Wilson ===
- "The Elements: Fire" (SMiLE, 2004)

=== The Edgar Winter Group ===
- "Frankenstein" (They Only Come Out at Night, 1972)

=== Link Wray ===
- "Rumble" (1958), No. 16 US, No. 11 R&B

== Y ==
=== The Yardbirds ===
- "Steeled Blues", (B-side of Heart Full of Soul, 1965)
- "Jeff's Boogie" (B-side of "Over Under Sideways Down" 1966)
- "White Summer" (Little Games, 1967)

=== Yes ===
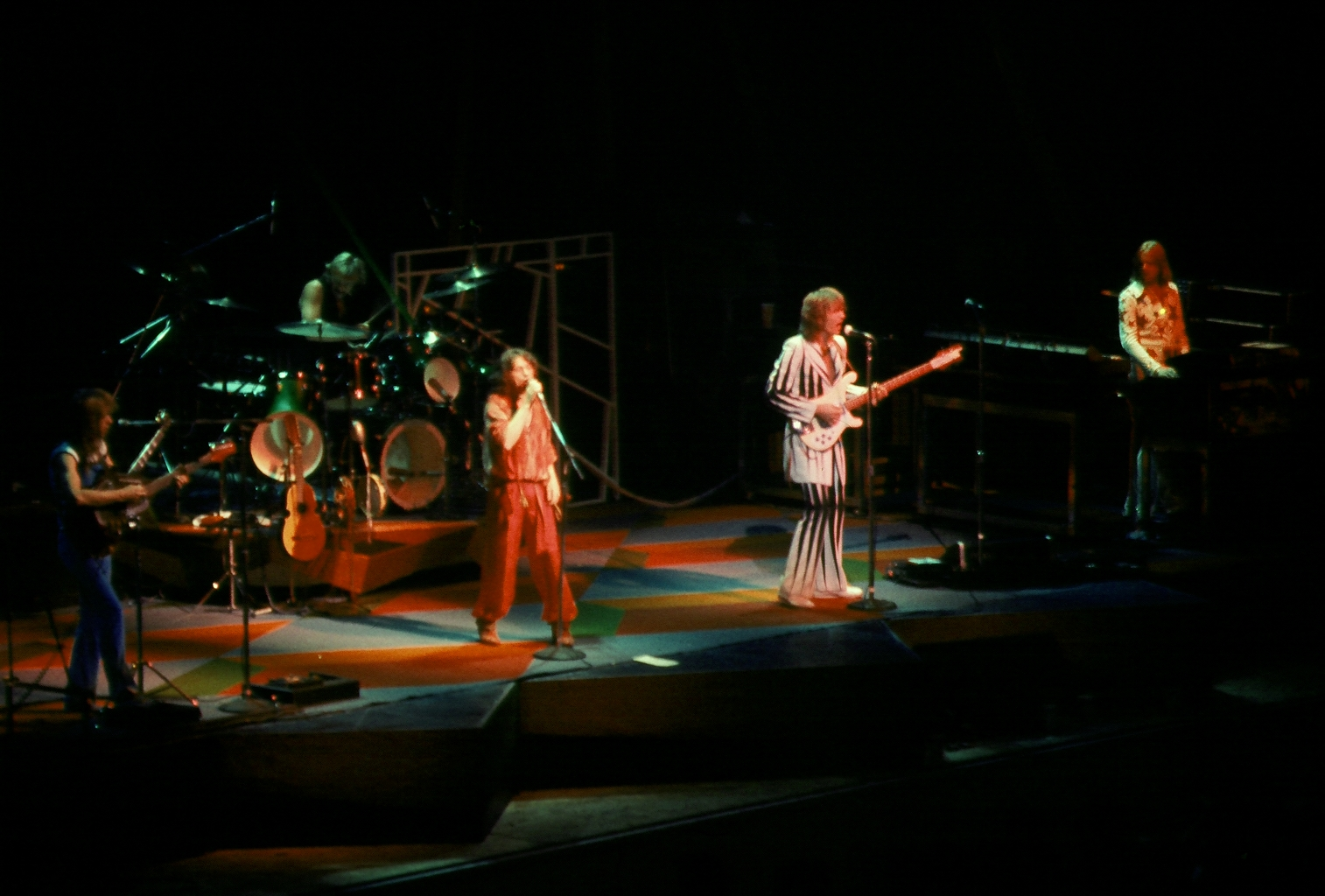
Yes.

- "Mood for a day" (Fragile)
- "The Fish (Schindleria Praematurus)" (Fragile)
- "Five Per Cent For Nothing" (Fragile)
- "Cinema" (90125, 1983)
- "Amazing Grace" (9012Live: The Solos)

=== Neil Young ===
- Soundtrack to Dead Man, 1996)

=== Yowie ===
- Cryptooology (2004)

== Z ==
=== Frank Zappa ===
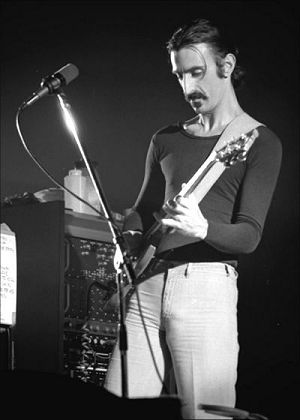
Frank Zappa playing in Oslo in January 1977.

A significant portion of Zappa's discography consists of instrumental works, but many of these could be classified as modern classical or avant-garde music rather than rock.

- "Peaches en Regalia" (Hot Rats, 1969)
- "Eat That Question" (The Grand Wazoo)
- Sleep Dirt (1979 - reissues of this album featured overdubbed vocals on several tracks)
- "Rat Tomago" (Sheik Yerbouti, 1979)
- Shut Up 'n Play Yer Guitar/Shut Up 'n Play Yer Guitar Some More/Return of the Son of Shut Up 'n Play Yer Guitar (1981)
- Jazz from Hell (1986)
- The Guitar World According to Frank Zappa (1987)
- Guitar (1988)
- Frank Zappa Plays the Music of Frank Zappa: A Memorial Tribute (1996)
- Trance-Fusion (2006)

ZZ Top

- Asleep In the Desert (Tejas, 1976)

== See also ==
- Grammy Award for Best Rock Instrumental Performance
- Heavy metal music
- Instrumental rock
- List of instrumental bands
- Rock and roll
- Surf music
