= Resonator (Tony Levin album) =

Studio album by Tony Levin
- Released: April 4, 2006
- Recorded: 2006
- Genre: Progressive rock, art pop rock
- Length: 51:11
- Label: Narada
- Producer: Tony Levin

Tony Levin chronology
Double Espresso (2002)	Resonator (2006)	Stick Man (2007)

Professional ratings
Review scores
Source	Rating
AllMusic	3.5/5 stars

Resonator is a 2006 album by Tony Levin. The album is significantly different from Levin's previous solo efforts mainly due to the introduction of lead vocals on most of the tracks as well as an overall more rock-oriented sound.

The song "Utopia" originally appeared on an earlier Levin album Waters of Eden as an instrumental piece. The new version adds vocals and a guitar solo by Toto guitarist Steve Lukather. "Throw the God a Bone" features a guest performance by King Crimson singer/guitarist Adrian Belew. This was the first (and only as of November 2009) studio recording made to feature both Levin and Belew since the 1995 THRAK sessions.

== Track listing ==
1. "Break It Down" – 7:02
2. "Places to Go" – 5:47
3. "Throw the God a Bone" – 5:25
4. "Utopia" – 6:21
5. "Beyond My Reach" – 5:16
6. "Shadowland" – 4:58
7. "Crisis of Faith" – 2:10
8. "What Would Jimi Do?" – 4:34
9. "Sabre Dance" – 5:07 (Aram Khachaturian)
10. "Fragile as a Song – 4:31

== Personnel ==
- Tony Levin – lead vocals, cello, piano, keyboards, bass guitar, Chapman stick
- Jerry Marotta – drums, background vocals
- Pete Levin – piano, organ
- Larry Fast – synthesizers
- Jesse Gress – guitar, background vocals
- Adrian Belew – lead guitar on "Throw The God A Bone"
- Steve Lukather – lead guitar on "Utopia"
