= Double Espresso =

Live album by Tony Levin
- Released: November 5, 2002
- Recorded: 2002
- Genre: Experimental rock, progressive rock, progressive metal
- Length: 112:00
- Label: Narada
- Producer: Tony Levin

Tony Levin chronology
Pieces of the Sun (2002)	Double Espresso (2002)	Resonator (2006)

Professional ratings
Review scores
Source	Rating
Allmusic	3.5/5 stars

Double Espresso is a live album performed by The Tony Levin Band at the Bearsville Theater, Woodstock, New York.

== Track listing ==
=== Disk One ===
1. "Pieces Of The Sun" - 7:15
2. "Geronimo" - 3:27
3. "Silhouette" - 4:35
4. "Dog One" - 5:36 (Peter Gabriel cover)
5. "Tequila" - 5:15 (rearrangement of The Champs song)
6. "Black Dog" - 5:35 (Led Zeppelin cover)
7. "Ooze" - 4:33
8. "Apollo" - 8:44
9. "L'Abito della Sposa" - 4:06 (Ivano Fossati - Tony Levin)
10. "Sleepless" - 6:59 (King Crimson cover)

=== Disk Two ===
1. "Pillar of Fire" - 6:59
2. "Ever The Sun Will Rise" - 7:48
3. "Phobos" - 7:01 (band arrangement of a song recorded by Larry Fast under his Synergy project name)
4. "The Fifth Man" - 5:56
5. "Back in N.Y.C." - 6:13 (Genesis cover)
6. "Utopia" - 7:39
7. "Elephant Talk" - 5:51 (King Crimson cover)
8. "Peter Gunn" - 3:48 (Henry Mancini cover)
9. "Belle" - 4:24

== Personnel ==
- Larry Fast : synthesizers, bass drum (disc1-07)
- Jesse Gress : guitars, vocals (disc1-04 and 05)
- Tony Levin : bass, cello, Chapman stick, acoustic guitar (disc1-08), lead vocals (disc1-09, disc2-07), vocals (disc1-04,05 and 10)
- Jerry Marotta : drums, sax, vocals, percussion (disc1-05), acoustic guitar (disc1-08), Funk Finger guitar (disc1-07), lead vocals (disc1-10, disc2-05)
- The California Guitar Trio (Bert Lams, Hideyo Moriya, Paul Richards) : acoustic guitars (disc2-08)
- Doug Stringer : drums (disc1-05)
- Pete Levin : keyboards (disc2-09)

=== Production ===
- Produced by Tony Levin
- Recorded live at Bearsville Theater, Woodstock, NY, except disc2-08 recorded at Blueberry Hill, St. Louis
- Recorded, Assembly and Pre-Remixing Engineering : Robert Frazza
- Mixing Engineer : Terry Brown
- Mastering Engineer : David Torn
