= Pieces of the Sun =

Studio album by Tony Levin
- Released: February 12, 2002
- Recorded: Applehead Studios, Woodstock, New York
- Genre: Instrumental rock, space rock, progressive rock
- Label: Narada Productions
- Producer: Tony Levin

Tony Levin chronology
Waters of Eden (2000)	Pieces of the Sun (2002)	Double Espresso (2002)

Professional ratings
Review scores
Source	Rating
AllMusic	4/5 stars

Pieces of the Sun is bassist Tony Levin's third solo album. It is an instrumental record blending elements of jazz, progressive rock, experimental, and international music. It featured his touring group of the time, which included keyboardist Larry Fast, guitarist Jesse Gress, and drummer Jerry Marotta. The California Guitar Trio accompanies this quartet on the opening track, "Apollo."

In addition to percussion duties, Marotta also plays acoustic guitar, Omnichord and saxophone on the album. The only vocals are the spoken word "Tequila" on "Tequila" and "dog one!," "dog two!", "dog three!" on "Dog One," which is a new recording of a Peter Gabriel composition, which Levin, Marotta and Fast had developed together while in Gabriel's band.

"Apollo" was nominated for the Grammy Award for Best Rock Instrumental Performance in 2003.

== Track listing ==
1. "Apollo" (Tony Levin) - 6:49
2. "Geronimo" (Levin, Larry Fast, Jesse Gress, Jerry Marotta) - 3:11
3. "Aquafin" (Levin) - 5:13
4. "Dog One" (Peter Gabriel) - 5:15
5. "Tequila" (Levin, Chuck Rio) - 5:20
6. "Pieces of the Sun" (Levin, Marotta) - 7:20
7. "Phobos" (Fast) - 7:08
8. "Ooze" (Levin) - 4:16
9. "Blue Nude Reclining" (Levin, Fast, Gress, Marotta) - 3:08
10. "The Fifth Man" (Levin) - 5:47
11. "Ever the Sun Will Rise" (Levin) - 9:08
12. "Silhouette" (Levin) - 4:37

== Personnel ==
=== Musicians ===
- Tony Levin - Chapman Stick (tracks 1, 2, 4, 7, 9–11), Music Man StingRay Bass (tracks 1, 5, 6), cello (tracks 6, 8, 11), NS Electric Upright Bass (track 2), electric fretless bass (tracks 3, 9, 12), acoustic bass guitar (track 1), electric guitar (track 8), Omnichord (track 3), vocals (tracks 4, 5)
- Larry Fast - synthesizers on all tracks except track 8, vocals (track 5)
- Jesse Gress - guitars (tracks 1–7, 9–12), backwards guitar (track 8), vocals (tracks 4, 5)
- Jerry Marotta - drums on all tracks except track 8, percussion (tracks 5, 6), tenor saxophone (tracks 5, 9), acoustic guitars (track 3), Omnichord (track 3), Taos drum (track 8), vocals (track 4, 5)
- California Guitar Trio - acoustic guitars on "Apollo"

=== Production ===
- Tony Levin - Producer
- Robert Frazza - Engineer
- Doug Stringer - Premix and overdub engineer
- Kevin Killen - Mixing engineer
- Trevor Sadler - Mastering
