= Walking Into Mirrors =

Studio album by Johnny Warman
- Released: 1981
- Studio: The Town House, London; House of Music, West Orange, New Jersey; Electric Lady Studios, New York City
- Label: Rocket
- Producer: Johnny Warman, Vic Coppersmith-Heaven

Johnny Warman chronology
Hour Glass (1979)	Walking Into Mirrors (1981)	From The Jungle To The New Horizons (1982)

Walking Into Mirrors is a 1981 album by Johnny Warman. The single "Screaming Jets" featured Peter Gabriel singing backing vocals and became Warman's best-known hit.

== Track listing ==
All tracks composed by Johnny Warman; except where indicated

1. "Walking Into Mirrors"
2. "Radio Active"
3. "Searchlights"
4. "Martian Summer"
5. "Screaming Jets"
6. "Three Minutes"
7. "Will You Dance with Me"
8. "(SOS) Sending Out Signals" (Warman, Jerry Marotta)
9. "Dancing Dolls"
10. "Fantastic Light"
11. "American Machines"
12. "Automatic Kids"
13. King Robot"
14. "Future Fun" (Live)
15. "Here Come the Reds"
16. "Golden Lions"

== Personnel ==
- Johnny Warman - vocals, acoustic and electric guitar
- Tony Levin - bass guitar, fretless bass, Chapman bass stick
- John Giblin - bass guitar
- Dave Lawson - keyboards, sequencing
- Larry Fast - keyboards, synthesizer, effects, electronic cello, bagpipes
- Jerry Marotta - drums, percussion
- Peter Gabriel - chants and effects on "Screaming Jets"

Technical

- Johnny Warman, Vic Coppersmith-Heaven - production, arrangements
- Hugh Padgham - engineer
- Bob Carlos Clarke, Lindsey Rudland - sleeve design, photography
- Richard Evans - graphic design
