= Linda de Suza =

French singer and author (1948–2022)

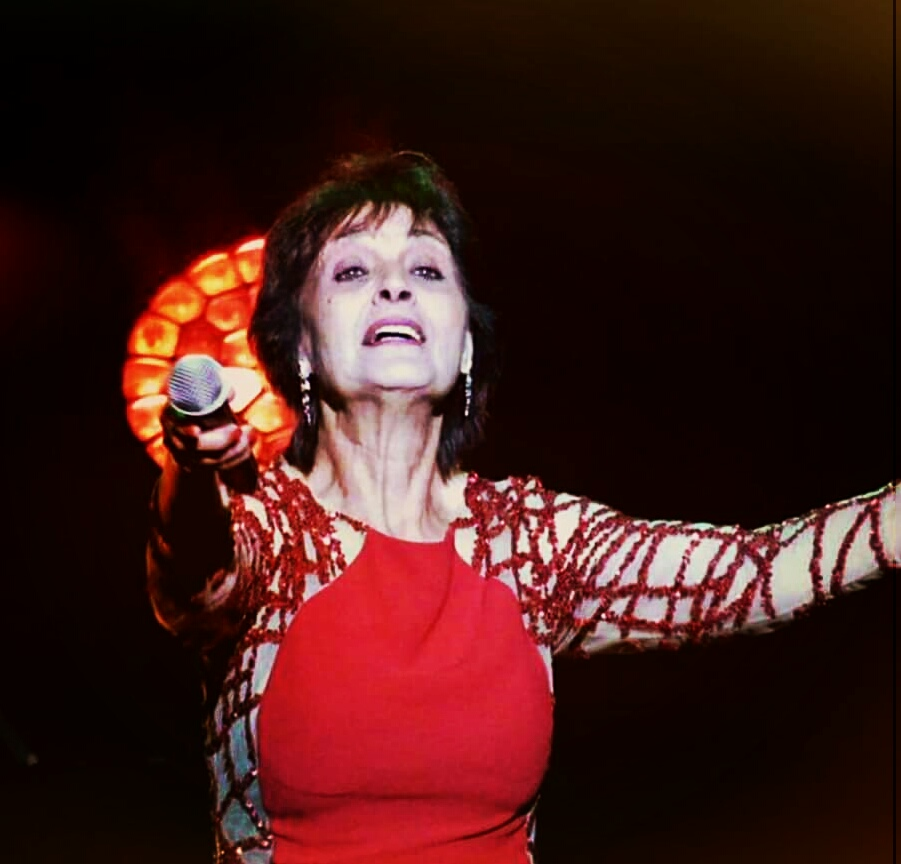
- De Suza in 2017

Background information
- Born: Teolinda Joaquina de Sousa Lança; 22 February 1948; Beringel, Beja, Portugal
- Died: 28 December 2022 (aged 74) Gisors, Normandy, France
- Genres: Folk; fado; pop
- Instrument: Vocals
- Years active: 1978–1998; 2014–2022
- Labels: Carrere (1978–1986); CBS (1987–1988); DRM/RM2 (1989–1990); PolyGram (1991); AB Production (1992)

Teolinda Joaquina de Sousa Lança (European Portuguese pronunciation: [tjuˈlĩdɐ ʒwɐˈkinɐ ðɨ ˈsozɐ ˈlɐ̃sɐ]; 22 February 1948 – 28 December 2022), better known as Linda de Suza, was a Portuguese Lusophone and Francophone singer and best-selling author. She was described by Portuguese President Marcelo Rebelo de Sousa as "a French icon of Portuguese migration".

== Early life ==
Linda de Suza was born in Beringel, Beja (Alentejo), in southern Portugal. Suza left her homeland for France in the 1970s and started to work in menial jobs.

== Career ==
In the late 1970s, she managed to record music albums. Her works such as Tiroli-Torola, La fille qui pleurait, Un Enfant peut faire le monde, and L'Étrangère drew a large audience in France. She topped her success with her performance at Paris Olympia.

Linda de Suza sang fado, folk, ballads and popular songs in both French and Portuguese and was nicknamed "Amália of France" after Amália Rodrigues, to whom she paid tribute in her song "Amália". Amália Rodrigues, known as "Rainha do Fado" ("Queen of Fado") paved the way for Linda de Suza, Tonicha, Lenita Gentil, Cândida Branca Flor, Dulce Pontes, Mariza and Mísia, among other well known Portuguese and Portuguese-descended singers.

In 1984, Linda de Suza published her autobiography La Valise en Carton ("The Cardboard Suitcase"). The book was also published the same year in Portugal, as A Mala de Cartão. Her book was followed by a number of novels. La Valise en carton was adapted into a cinema-film miniseries in 1988. All were successful.

== Death ==
Linda de Suza died in France from complications of COVID-19 on 28 December 2022, aged 74.

== Albums ==
- 1978: La fille qui pleurait / Un Portugais
- 1979: Amália / Lisboa
- 1980: Face à face
- 1981: Vous avez tout changé
- 1981: Em Português
- 1982: L'Étrangère
- 1983: Comme vous
- 1984: La Chance
- 1984: Profil
- 1985: Rendez-le moi
- 1986: La Valise en carton: la comédie musicale
- 1989: Qu'est-ce que tu sais faire?
- 1991: Simplement vivre

Live albums

- 1983: A L'Olympia

Compilation albums

- 1980: 13+3
- 1981: Disque d'or (Un enfant peut faire chanter le monde)
- 1982: 13+3
- 1985: 13+3
- 1986: Super Look Compilation
- 1992: Linda de Suza: Ses plus belles chansons
- 1995: Best Of
- 1998: Linda de Suza (Best of, also including some unpublished songs)

and many others

== Singles and tracks ==
Linda de Suza sang in Portuguese and French. Some of her best-known songs (with chart positions in France wherever applicable):

Year	Song(s)	Peak position France
1978	"Un Portugais"	49
1979	Uma moça chorava	52
1979	"La fille qui pleurait"	82
1979	"Lisboa" / "Je ne demande pas"	65
1979	"Amália (Ne laisse pas mourir le fado)" / "Les œillets rouges"	
1980	"Tiroli-tirola" / "Não te cases"	3
1980	"Hola! La vie" / "Le Moissonneur"	72
1980	"Un enfant peut faire chanter le monde" / "Vive la liberté"	58
1981	"Frente a frente" / "Face à face"	
1981	"Toi, mon amour caché" / "Dans les yeux de l'homme qui nous aime"	43
1981	"Chuvinha (Petite pluie)" / "Chuva... Chuvinha"	84
1982	"Si tu existes encore" / "Vous les hommes"	81
1982	"La maison de cet été" / "O malmequer mentiroso"	85
1982	"On est fait pour vivre ensemble"	37
1982	"L'Étrangère" / "Maria Dolores"	
1982	"Une fille de tous les pays" / "Nasci para cantar"	
1983	"Canto Fado (Medley)" / "Superstitieuse"	
1983	"Comme un homme" / "Kennedy"	59
1983	"Marinheiro" / "Coimbra (Avril au Portugal)"	
1984	"Comme vous" / "C'est l'amour"	50
1984	"Marinheiro" / Tu seras son père"	63
1984	"Un jour on se rencontrera" / "Bailinho da Madeira"	41
1984	"Un jour on se rencontrera" / "Aventurier"	63
1984	"Gri Gri" / "Un jour ici, un jour ailleurs"	84
1984	"La Chance" / "Niño Mau"	71
1985	"Rendez-le moi" / "Como um portugues sem fado"	81
1986	"Cavaleiro / L'Exil"	85
1986	"Take me back to the time" / "If you don't love me, let me go"	
1986	"La Volonté" / "De moi ici à moi mà-bas"	80
1986	"L'endroit où la pluie cesse"	96
1987	"Maradona" / "Nos yeux font l'amour"	
1988	"Ça ne s'oublie pas" / "Canta teu passado"	95
1989	"Dis-moi pourquoi' (duo with her son João Lança (Janot)) / "Qu’est-ce que tu sais faire?"	
1989	"Pela estrada a fora" / "Qu’est-ce que tu sais faire ?"	
1989	"Hör die Musik" / "Grossmama in Jeans Activ"	
1990	"Les Enfants de Balaïa" / "Os Meninos da Balaia"	
1991	"Rien qu'un sourire" / "Ne perds pas l'espoir"	85
1991	"En chaque enfant se cache une fleur" / "Meu lirio rouxo"	
1992	"Baté o pé" / "Vou eu vou"	
