= Johnny Warman =

- Born: John Robert Waughman; Bethnal Green, London, England
- Origin: London, England
- Genres: Rock; pop; avant-garde
- Occupations: Singer, songwriter
- Instruments: Vocals, guitar
- Years active: 1970s–present
- Labels: Arista Records, Ring O'Records, The Rocket Record Company, RAK
- Formerly of: Bearded Lady, Three Minutes, The Mods
- Website: www.johnnywarman.com

John Robert Waughman, better known as Johnny Warman, is an English singer-songwriter, best known for his 1981 album, Walking Into Mirrors and the hit single "Screaming Jets".

== Early life ==
Warman was born in Bethnal Green, London, England, and he moved to Hackney at the age of seven. In Warman's home there was always music as his mother and father both sang. Inspired by the Beatles at the age of 11, when he heard their song "Love Me Do" playing on a Dansette record player, he joined the school choir and in 1964 was picked to sing at the Royal Opera House performing in Tosca and Pagliachi with Maria Callas and Tito Gobbi. After this royal command performance he knew he wanted to be a performer and began to learn guitar, He soon began to play gigs. Warman joined a band called Sounds Like Six when at school. As a keen fan of The Rolling Stones and The Who he frequented many live music venues of the time. Warman followed other bands such as The Iveys and Pink Floyd and became a keen reader of Melody Maker. After hearing Jimi Hendrix's song "Hey Joe" in 1966, he was inspired to become a Rock musician.

== Beginning of career and Bearded Lady ==
In the early 1970s, Warman joined the group Bearded Lady (originally named Elmo's Fire) as a vocalist and rhythm guitarist. The band also included guitarist Freddy Sheriff an old school friend. Eventually managed by John Hunt and Barry Sullivan's Hunsul Enterprises, they performed U.K venues such as The Hope And Anchor in London, other venues across U.K. and as a support act for Humphrey Lyttelton in Fishguard. The group then focused their efforts on their live act and built up a following and they were brought to the attention of Mickie Most and Micky was a great fan of Johnnys song writing abilities and also as a performer.

Bearded Lady entered the National Folk And Rock Contest in 1974 and were voted into second place in the final to Curly who had Paul Young as their vocalist. They signed a record deal with Youngblood records, which released a single "Rock Star" in 1975 and featured the song "Country Lady" on the B-side. The band toured West Germany appearing at Zoom in Frankfurt and the P.N. Club in Munich, promoting the German release of the single released on the Bellaphon in print. Warman worked a day job to support his wife and young family and still insisted the band commit to at least four nights of rehearsals a week. The band members other than Warman decided to sell all their equipment and their van without telling him and the band played their final gig at the Marquee Club in London supported by The Jam. Warman then pursued a solo career and began to spell his surname "Warman" rather than "Waughman".

== Solo success, Ring O' Records and Hour Glass ==
Warman took demo tapes of "Head On Collision", "London's Burning" and "Mind Games" to Arista Records, who asked for the songs to be re-recorded at Decibel Studios. They decided against signing him but allowed him to retain the re-recorded tracks. Warman was then contacted by Barry Anthony from Ringo Starr's Ring O'Records. Warman signed to the label with a retainer for the year and compensation for the rights of the 4 songs he brought to Ring O'Records. He was also given two cases of beer and a Christmas tree to take home for his family.

With Starr's record company, he recorded an album at Startling Studios at Tittenhurst Park and chose Vic Coppersmith-Heaven as producer, because of Coppersmith-Heaven's work with The Jam. They immediately re-mixed the three demos at Morgan Studios which were released as a three-track single by Ring O'Records in January 1978. Warman then recorded the album Hour Glass at Startling Studios which was remixed at Roundhouse Studios in 1978. Ring O' Records did not release the planned album and the recordings were shelved. In June 1979 the album was launched at Hamburg Planetarium by an RCA in print and received encouraging reviews but failed to make any chart impact. A single to promote the album entitled "Golden Lions" was released to accompany the Hourglass album in West Germany. This single was recorded at Townhouse Studios with the song "Tomorrow's Babies" from the album as a B-side. During his period Warman also featured in the music video for Dirk & Stig's "Ging Gang Goolie" promotional music video

== Three Minutes, Rocket Records ==
Ring O'Records ceased trading and Warman continued to develop his own sound and formed Three Minutes. The band toured supporting The Vapors for twenty-nine dates and XTC for six dates. The group disbanded after releasing a single "Automatic Kids", in 1980 on Elton John's Rocket label, the song "Future Fun" was the B-side. This was Warman's most widespread release being distributed in Britain, France, West Germany, the Netherlands and Portugal. Three Minutes disbanded and Rocket began releasing of Warman's solo work in 1981.

== Walking into Mirrors, Australian chart success ==
His second solo album, Walking into Mirrors, was also released by Rocket in 1981. The sound was heavily rooted in the previous demos by Warman's former band Three Minutes, although neither of the two former band members featured on the album. Jerry Marotta played drums and Dave Lawson was brought in to play keyboards. Recording began on 9 December 1980 the day that John Lennon was assassinated in New York and Johnny remembers Hugh Padgham arguing with Jerry Marotta saying that it would never have happened in the UK but I was just starting my album at Townhouse Studios, where they used studio two, "The Stone Room".

By the end of the first day of recording backing tracks including "Walking into Mirrors" were completed. Over the next two weeks the album continued to develop and Tony Levin invited the musicians to The Record Plant in New York City. Larry Fast also became involved in the project, before moving recording sessions to the House Of Music in West Orange, New Jersey. During this time the Ampex tape the recordings were made on started to decompose. Peter Gabriel added chants and other vocals on the song "Screaming Jets". The lead single from the album was "Will you Dance with Me" which had "King Robot" on the B-side, a song not included on the album. The second single was "Screaming Jets" with "American Machines" on the B-side, a song not included on the album. "Screaming Jets" also saw the creation of Warman's first music video which was directed by Jeff Baines.

In 1982, Warman was promised an Australian tour if the single sold 7,000 copies in Australia. The single sold 76,000 copies and reached No.9 in the Australian charts but the tour was not forthcoming. At this time Warman appeared on an episode of "Countdown" with Molly Meldrum which was filmed in London. The album Walking into Mirrors was released in July 1981 in the UK, Europe, Australia and New Zealand and sold over 100,000 copies worldwide. A second music video was also made for the title track, which was also directed by Jeff Baines. Later in 1981 "Martian Summer" was released as a single in the Netherlands. The final single from the album was a remix of "Three Minutes", with the non-album track "Jon Glass" as the B-side.

Capitalizing on the success of Walking into Mirrors Warman took to the road, making live and television performances in Sweden, West Germany, Belgium, France, Spain (Music Express), Portugal (Festa é Festa), the U.K. and the Netherlands, where he appeared second on the bill to Ian Hunter at the New Pop Festival in Rotterdam in 1982.

The Rocket Record Company encouraged Warman to start work on a second album, which was to become the more musically intricate From The Jungle to the New Horizons. The album was recorded at The Manor Studios in Oxford and produced by Warman and Coppersmith-Heaven. Warman was Alain joined by drummer Jerry Marotta also bassistTony Levin, Guitarist Chris Payne of Dramatis and keyboard player Andy Clark. Kiki Dee sang backing vocals to the songs "(United) The State Of America" and "Looking Back (To See If Someone's Looking Back at Me)". "Dream Dream Dream" was the only single taken from the album, released in 1983 a month before the album. Neither the single nor the album made any impact and The Rocket Record Company withdrew their contract.

== "Don't Call Me", songwriting for others and A Song for Europe ==
In 1984, Warman started writing for other artists and recorded his final solo release "(Here Comes) The Beat Patrol", with the song "Don't Call Me" as a B-side under the guidance of Mickie Most. The single was released in RAK records in UK in October 1984. "Beat Patrol" was covered by Starship in 1987 and reached number 46 in the U.S charts. "Don't Call Me" was later covered by Asia on their 1992 album along with Who will stop the Rain, Someday, and Crime of the Heart on the Aqua.

During 1984 Warman also appeared in the music videos for Alexei Sayle's "'Ullo John! Gotta New Motor?" and Hot Chocolate.

In 1985, the Star Sisters covered the Johnny Warman and Gary Osborne song "Skin on Skin" originally planned for release by Melissa Manchester. In 1986 Warman became a member of band Future. Their song "War of the Roses" was released by 10 Records as a single, with the song "Main Attraction" on the b-side. "War of the Roses" became a UK national selection for the Song for Europe and was performed on BBC One on 2 April 1986

On 1 January 1989 Warman sang vocals on "Spirit of the Forest", a charity single and can briefly be seen standing next to David Gilmour in the accompanying music video.

== Ringo Starr, second Song for Europe ==
During 1991, Warman wrote "Don't Go Where The Road Don't Go", "After All These Years" "Everyone Wins" and "Runaways" with Ringo Starr, which were included on Starr's album Time Takes Time released in 1992. He also supported Starr's All-Starr Band in London, and unusually they both included Warman's song "Don't Go Where The Road Don't Go" as part of their sets.

Warman wrote six songs for Geoff Downes's album Vox Humana, released in 1992. On this album he also sings on the track "Satellite Blues". On 3 April 1993, the Johnny Warman and Nick Graham song "Our World" was entered into A Song for Europe and sung by Sonia. The song was placed second and Sonia released the song on her album Better The Devil You Know.

== De Wolfe, The Mods ==
During 1996, he recorded two albums of Library music for De Wolfe Music and contributed the song "Everyone Wins" on Ringo Starr's album, Y Not.

In 2000, he formed The Mods who played at the Steve Marriott tribute in 2001 and performed tracks from the 1960s. Warman also started performing songs from 1960s and 1970s with Four Bills and a Ben. The lineup included John "Rhino" Edwards, Steve Byrd, saxophonist Andy Hamilton, Spike Edney and guitarist Mark Rich.

== Discography ==
=== Singles ===
| Date | Artist | Label | Cat. # | Tracks |
|---|---|---|---|---|
| 11/1975 | Bearded Lady | Youngblood; Bellaphon | YB 1076; BF 18389 | Rock Star/Country Lady |
| 1/1978 | Johnny Warman | Ring O'Records | 2017 112 | Head On Collision/London's Burning/Mind Games |
| 1979 | Johnny Warman | RCA/Able | PB 5658 | Golden Lions/Tomorrow's Babies |
| 5 September 1980 | 3 Minutes | Rocket | XPRES 40; 6000 487 | Automatic Kids/Future Fun |
| 3 April 1981 | Johnny Warman | Rocket | XPRES 51; 6000 654 | Dance With Me/King Robot |
| 5 June 1981 | Johnny Warman | Rocket | XPRES 56; 6000 688 | Screaming Jets/American Machines |
| 1981 | Johnny Warman | Rocket | 6000 732 | Martian Summer/Three Minutes |
| 13 November 1981 | Johnny Warman | Rocket | XPRES 57 | Three Minutes/Jon Glass |
| 5 November 1982 | Johnny Warman | Rocket | XPRES 89; 6000 904 | Dream Dream Dream/Satellite |
| 5 October 1984 | Johnny Warman | RAK | RAK 376 | (Here Comes) The Beat Patrol/Don't Call Me |
| 4/1986 | Future | 10 Records | Ten 119 | War of the Roses/Main Attraction |
| 1989 | Spirit of the Forest | Virgin; Polydor | VS1191; 863 830-1 | Spirit of the Forest/Spirit of the Forest |

=== Albums ===
| Date | Artist | Label | Cat. # | Name |
|---|---|---|---|---|
| 6/1979 | Johnny Warman | RCA/Able | PL 30052 | Hour Glass |
| 7/1981 | Johnny Warman | Rocket; Phillips | TRAIN 17; 6302 132 | Walking into Mirrors |
| 12/1982 | Johnny Warman | Rocket | 6302 214 | From The Jungle to the New Horizons |
| 22 April 2002 | | Simply Vinyl | SVLP 378 | Mustn't Grumble: The Steve Marriott Memorial Concert 2001 |

=== CDs ===
| Date | Artist | Label | Cat. # | Name |
|---|---|---|---|---|
| 22 April 2002 | Steve Marriott Memorial Concert | Sanctuary | SANCD 112 | Mustn't Grumble: The Steve Marriott Memorial Concert 2001 |
| 7 October 2002 | Johnny Warman | Angel Air | SJPCD 127 | Walking into Mirrors |
| 12 January 2004 | Bearded Lady | Angel Air | SJPCD 153 | The Rise And Fall |
| 14 June 2004 | Johnny Warman | Angel Air | SJPCD 170 | From The Jungle to the New Horizons |
| 11 April 2005 | Johnny Warman | Angel Air | SJPCD 183 | Hour Glass |

== Library Music ==
| Date | Label | Cat. # | Name |
|---|---|---|---|
| 1996 | De Wolfe | DWCD 0207 | Jazz Phase Two – Acid Jazz |
| 1997 | De Wolfe | DWCD 0225 | Summer Vibrations |
| 2001 | Chappell | CHAP 274 | Wacky And Tacky |
