= Happy Rhodes =

American singer (born 1965)

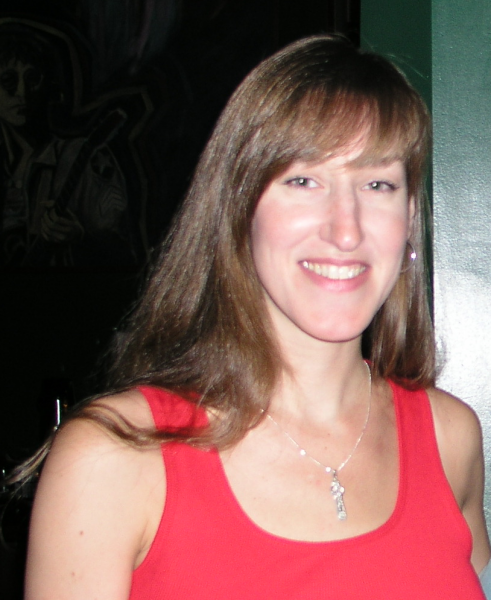
- Happy Rhodes in 2003

Background information
- Born: Kimberley Tyler Rhodes; August 9, 1965 (age 61); Poughkeepsie, New York, U.S.
- Origin: Albany, New York, U.S.
- Genres: Alternative rock, art rock, acoustic, pop rock
- Occupations: Singer, songwriter, musician
- Instruments: Vocals, guitar, keyboards
- Years active: 1984–present
- Label: 7D Media
- Website: happyrhodesmusic.com

Happy Rhodes (born Kimberley Tyler Rhodes; August 9, 1965) is an American singer, musician, and songwriter with a four-octave vocal range, releasing 11 albums between 1986 and 2007.

== Family ==
Rhodes' maternal grandfather Dave Stamper wrote songs for the Ziegfeld Follies of 1913 through 1931 and composed the music for several other Broadway shows. A family legend claims that Stamper wrote the well-known song "Shine On, Harvest Moon" in 1903 for Nora Bayes when he was working as her Vaudeville piano accompanist, but sold the rights and credit to Bayes and her husband Jack Norworth. Rhodes' parents divorced when she was young. Rhodes has two brothers who are twins.

== Musical background ==
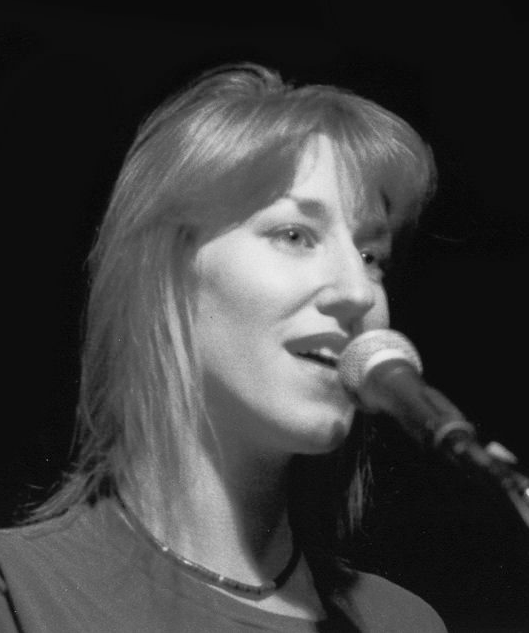
Happy Rhodes at the Tin Angel Philadelphia, PA 1996

Rhodes received her first musical instrument, an acoustic guitar, as a gift from her mother, at age 11. At 14 she was performing original songs in school shows. She left school early at age 16, choosing to obtain a GED. From age 16 to 18, Rhodes began performing in open mic nights at Caffè Lena in Saratoga Springs, New York. During this period, Rhodes met Pat Tessitore, the owner of a recording studio, Cathedral Sound Studios in Rensselaer, and became a studio intern to learn recording techniques. Tessitore was impressed with Rhodes' voice and songwriting and volunteered to record all of the songs she had written to that point.

Tessitore introduced Rhodes to Kevin Bartlett, a musician who had his record label, Aural Gratification, and he urged her to gather up all the songs that she had recorded, to be released on cassette. She had enough songs to release three cassettes at the same time in 1986, Rhodes Vol. I, Rhodes Vol. II, and Rearmament. In 1987, she released the cassette of Ecto. Her first CD release was Warpaint, in 1991. The first four albums were only available on hand-dubbed cassettes until they were re-released on CD in 1992. For the CD releases, Rhodes Vol. I was renamed Rhodes I, and Rhodes Vol. II was renamed Rhodes II. Each of the CD re-releases contained bonus tracks not on the original cassettes. Aural Gratification released nine Happy Rhodes albums between 1986 and 1995, including Equipoise and RhodeSongs in 1993, Building The Colossus in 1994, and The Keep in 1995. Rhodes left Aural Gratification in 1998.

Rhodes' 10th album, Many Worlds Are Born Tonight, was released in August 1998 by Samson Music, a label founded by Norm Waitt Jr., brother of Ted Waitt, co-founder of the Gateway Computer company. Rhodes was dropped from Samson when the label decided to concentrate on other genres of music and Samson transferred rights to the material back to Rhodes, as well as unsold products.

In 2001, Rhodes recorded an 11th album, called Find Me, which was released October 19, 2007.

Rhodes married musician Bob Muller in 2006 and they currently live on a farm in central upstate New York.

== Influences ==
Rhodes has cited Wendy Carlos, Kate Bush, Queen, Yes, David Bowie, Bach and Peter Gabriel as primary influences. Her father owned a large record collection which included Bagpipe music and Switched-On Bach, by Wendy Carlos. By age nine, Rhodes could sing along with every note from that album. As a teenager, she discovered the music of Queen and was impressed by their harmonies, which she later emulated on her first few albums. When Rhodes was introduced at age 16 to Kate Bush's music by an English pen pal, she was impressed by Bush's original writing style, vocal abilities, and independence as a female artist.

Rhodes has cited Bach's Air on a G String as her favorite piece of music.

== Live performances ==
Most of her live shows have been in the northeast of America, primarily Philadelphia and New York City. Rhodes has sold out every show she's performed in Philadelphia when she was the headliner. She has performed several times at the Tin Angel, where she always plays two shows in an evening. Rhodes has also played The Middle East Club in 1995, the Mann Theater (opening for 10,000 Maniacs) and the University Museum Auditorium, both in 1992. In New York City Rhodes has played the Bottom Line several times. In 1994 Rhodes performed at YesFest, a convention for fans of the band Yes. She has also performed at the Knitting Factory in New York City as a guest of the band Project Lo.

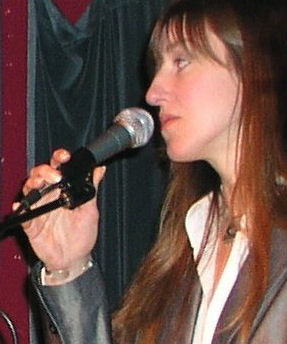
Happy Rhodes at the Tin Angel Philadelphia, PA 2005

As a solo artist Rhodes has performed in Philadelphia, New York City, Cambridge, MA, Troy, NY, Albany, NY, Saratoga, NY, Woodstock, NY, Bearsville, NY, New Haven, CT, Danbury, CT, Maple Shade, NJ, Denville, NJ, Bryn Mawr, PA, Mechanicsburg, PA, Cleveland, OH, Toledo, OH, Kenosha, WI, Chicago, IL and Santa Cruz, CA.

Her last major solo tour was in support of her album Many Worlds are Born Tonight in 1998, playing at the El Flamingo Club in New York City, the Troy Savings Bank Music Hall in Troy, New York, the Painted Bride Arts Center in Philadelphia, Pennsylvania and the Bearsville Theater in Bearsville, New York. Though the tour received positive reviews, It was not an economic success due to the ambitious multimedia presentation of the material.

=== Ectofest ===
In 1999 Meredith Tarr of New Haven and Chuck Stipak of Danbury, Connecticut organized a one-day music festival in Danbury to honor Rhodes and the mailing list Ecto, with all proceeds going to charity. The lineup for "Ectofest 1999," held on September 4, 1999, consisted of Rhodes, Rachael Sage, Sloan Wainwright, Susan McKeown and the Mila Drumke Band. Tarr and Stipak repeated the festival the next year and on September 2, 2000 "Ectofest 2000" featured Rhodes, Jessica Weiser, Anne Heaton, Amy Fairchild, Sloan Wainwright, Merrie Amsterburg and Susan McKeown.

In 2001, West Coast fans (Shelly Deforte, Phil Hudson, and Bill Mazur), who were encouraged by other members of the Ecto music discussion group to host a West Coast version of the event, organized "Ectofest West" in Santa Cruz, California, held on June 9, 2001, at the Kuumbwa Jazz Center. Rhodes flew to California to perform but on the day of the concert, she accidentally cut the ring finger on her fret hand while using a Leatherman tool, and severed the deep flexor tendon, as well as causing nerve damage. She was taken to the hospital where the hand was temporarily treated and bandaged. Rhodes performed 12 songs that evening sans guitar, relying on bandmates Eric Nicholas, Carl Adami, and Bob Muller to fill in her parts. Rhodes had surgery on the finger when she returned from California and underwent physical therapy so she could play the guitar again. Ectofest West is the only time Rhodes has performed in front of an audience west of Chicago. Other performers at the festival were Cyoakha Grace, Jill Tracy and Veda Hille. / Two Loons for Tea was scheduled to play but the band was stranded in Houston during a hurricane and was not able to get to Santa Cruz in time. Rhodes was scheduled to play Ectofest 2001 on August 25, 2001, in Danbury, CT but had to bow out because of her injury. Performers at that show were Edie Carey, Mila Drumke, Trina Hamlin, Jargon Society, Rachael Sage, and Molly Zenobia. 2001's show was the last Ectofest until the 2007 Ectofest with Happy Rhodes, Noe Venable, and Casey Desmond on September 8, 2007, at / the Lily Pad in Cambridge, MA. The show sold out 3 weeks in advance, with fans traveling from all over the United States and also Scotland and Germany.

=== Security Project ===
In 2016, Rhodes came out of retirement and started singing with Security Project, a Peter Gabriel appreciation band featuring Jerry Marotta, Trey Gunn, Michael Cozzi, and David Jameson, singing lead for 11 live shows in 2016, 19 shows in 2017, and 8 more shows in Spring 2018.

=== Miscellaneous live information ===
- After 2001's Ectofest West, Rhodes did not perform again until April 2003, when she performed at a house concert in New Haven with percussionist Bob Muller. Rhodes has also performed at house concerts in Maple Shade, NJ, Toledo, OH, and Kenosha, WI.
- Rhodes' most recent solo performance before Ectofest '07 was at the Tin Angel in Philadelphia on January 29, 2005, where she sold out two shows in the same evening.
- Rhodes has toured three times as guest keyboardist and vocalist for the Bon Lozaga band Project Lo, in 1997, 1999, and 2000.
- Through the years, Rhodes has performed live with backing musicians Bob Muller, Kevin Bartlett, Bon Lozaga, Carl Adami, Hansford Rowe, Kelly Bird, Martha Waterman, Eric Nicholas, Mark Foster, Ray Jung, Matthew Guarnere, Dave Sepowski, Peter Sheehan, Dean Sharp, Jamie Edwards and Paul Huesman.
- Rhodes has opened for or played on the same bill as 10,000 Maniacs, Shawn Colvin, Jeffrey Gaines, Pete & Maura Kennedy, Kyle Davis, Barbara Kessler, Willy Porter, and Steve Forbert, among others.

== Fans ==
In 1991, Rhodes developed a following in Philadelphia through airplay on WXPN-FM. Her song "Feed The Fire" (from her album Warpaint) was said to be one of the station's most requested songs of 1991. Rhodes has received airplay and has been interviewed on radio shows such as the syndicated programs Echoes, and The World Cafe. She has received airplay on Morning Becomes Eclectic from KCRW in Santa Monica, CA, and WDST in Woodstock, NY, where Rhodes lived for a time, appearing on the compilation Alternative Woodstock.

Much of the attention Rhodes has received has been via less traditional routes:

- In 1987 Aural Gratification released a sampler tape of Rhodes' music from the album Ecto. In the late summer of 1988 one of these cassettes was obtained by a programmer for an all-female-artists radio show called Suspended In Gaffa (named after a Kate Bush song) on KKFI-FM in Kansas City, MO. The programmer's discussion of Rhodes' music during 1989–1991 on the Kate Bush Usenet newsgroup rec.music.gaffa led to the formation in 1991 of the "Ecto" mailing list, named after Rhodes' 4th album and the song by the same name on the album.
- In 2000, an unknown person mislabeled one of Rhodes' non-album tracks, "When The Rain Came Down" (a bonus track on the CD re-release of Ecto), as being a duet between Kate Bush and Annie Lennox (who have never worked together), and shared it on the original Napster file-sharing network.

=== Ecto (the mailing list) ===
- Ecto the Internet mailing list was created on June 13, 1991, by Jessica Koeppel Dembski out of Rutgers University. Originally called "Ectoplasm," the mailing list name was changed within a few days. It has operated continuously since its inception, and has from the beginning encouraged discussion of other musicians besides Happy Rhodes, especially female artists. The mailing list changed hands in the mid-1990s to Greg Bossert, then shortly thereafter to Rob Woiccak, who continues to administer the list. Jeff Wasilko hosts the mailing list at his smoe domain, which hosts several other music mailing lists. Among fans, the term "Ecto," used as a genre name, has grown to encompass several musicians who do not fit comfortably in other musical genres, such as Kate Bush, Peter Gabriel and Jane Siberry. Rhodes' fans have called themselves "Ectophiles" since almost the beginning of the mailing list, and the name was the inspiration for Tori Amos fans calling themselves "Toriphiles." Ecto remains a busy discussion list, with members discussing Happy Rhodes and much other "Ecto"-philic music.
- Rhodes thanks the "Ectophiles" in the liner notes of the CD re-releases of Rhodes I, Rhodes II, Rearmament, Ecto, Many Worlds Are Born Tonight and Find Me.
- Rhodes and the mailing list Ecto were the inspiration for the creation of The Ectophiles' Guide to Good Music, a collection of music reviews by Ectophiles created in 1998 by poet and author Neile Graham.
- A fan magazine, Terra Incognita (aka Rhodeways), was published by Sharon Nichols from 1994 to 2000.

== Discography ==
Studio albums

- Rhodes Volume I (1986)
- Rhodes Volume II (1986)
- Rearmament (1986)
- Ecto (1987)
- Warpaint (1991)
- Equipoise (1993)
- Building the Colossus (1994)
- Many Worlds Are Born Tonight (1998)
- Find Me (2007)

Compilations

- Rhodesongs (1993)
- The Keep (1995)
- Happy Rhodes: Ectotrophia (2018)

=== 1983 – 1987 ===
Her first four albums, Rhodes Volume I (1986), Rhodes Volume II (1986), Rearmament (1986) and Ecto (1987) were not conceived and recorded as album releases, but were a gathering together of songs recorded at Cathedral Sound Studios over several years. When fellow musician Kevin Bartlett offered to release Rhodes' songs on his cassette-only personal label Aural Gratification, Rhodes culled through the songs she had recorded and ordered them to her satisfaction. Rhodes I and Rhodes II are often considered to be a double album by fans because the songs are similar in theme and instrumentation. The third cassette, Rearmament, uses more electronic instrumentation and often displays the influence of Wendy Carlos. The fourth cassette, Ecto, contained a greater number of the more recent songs Rhodes had recorded and showed a greater maturity and complexity, foreshadowing the music Rhodes would make in the future.

=== 1991 – 1995 ===
Rhodes' first four albums were co-produced by Pat Tessitore and Rhodes, the 1991 album Warpaint was the first result of her collaboration with musician, producer, and Aural Gratification record label owner Kevin Bartlett, and the first to feature musicians other than Rhodes. During this period, the two formed a duo named, appropriately enough, "Bartlett/Rhodes". They recorded several co-written songs and played a few dates, but the results were not generally considered successful, and they decided to continue on their endeavors. 1993 brought Equipoise an album of new material and Rhodesongs a compilation of music from Rhodes' first four albums, alternative versions, and a David Bowie cover. The cover of the 1994 album Building the Colossus commented on Rhodes' technically oriented fan base with an album sub-head of "c:\happy Rhodes" and featured Peter Gabriel collaborators Jerry Marotta and David Torn. This exceptionally productive period was capped with the 1995 compilation The Keep, featuring acoustic versions of earlier songs, the traditional Christmas song Oh Holy Night and a medley of songs by the group Yes.

=== 1996 – present ===
After having entertained several traditional record company offers, and rejecting them due to an unwillingness to give up rights to her music, Rhodes assumed production and engineering duties on the 1998 release Many Worlds Are Born Tonight. Once the album was complete, she signed with a new label, Samson Music, and was able to tour the northeastern United States with a more elaborate stage show. The song Roy was released as a single and reached #42 on the Billboard Club Play/Dance Music chart. While sales were far greater than her previous albums, Samson eventually decided to concentrate on their Gold Circle Films division and dropped Rhodes. The parting was amicable, and the label returned her musical rights, as well as all unsold products.

In 2001 Rhodes recorded a new album, Find Me, but it was not released until 2007, although a limited-edition CD sampler consisting of 8 songs – Fall, Charlie, The Chosen One, Can't Let Go, One And Many, Find Me, Here And Hereafter and She Won't Go was sold at her 2005 concert. The album includes three additional songs – Treehouse, Little Brother and Queen. One additional song, Shutdown, was recorded for the album but is not on the official release.

Musicians on Find Me include guitarist Bon Lozaga and bassist Hansford Rowe of Gongzilla, bassist Carl Adami, guitarists Ted Kumpel and Jon Cather and pianist Rob Schwimmer.

In 2018 the Chicago-based record label The Numero Group released a retrospective compilation of 18 songs titled "Happy Rhodes: Ectotrophia." The album package includes lyrics as well as extensive liner notes by Erin Osmon.

== Collaborations ==
- Kevin Bartlett: the duo Bartlett/Rhodes (1987–1989)
  - Bartlett/Rhodes demo recording (never publicly released)
- Robby Aceto
  - Additional vocals on the song "Shane Heads for the Immaculate Mountains" from Aceto's 1997 album Code.
- Samite
  - Atmospheric backing vocals on "Stars To Share" from Samite's 1999 album Stars To Share.
- William Ackerman
  - Lead vocals on "Before We Left All This Behind" from Ackerman's 2001 album Hearing Voices.
- Bob Holroyd
  - Provided vocals to Holroyd's cover of Peter Gabriel's "Games Without Frontiers" from Holroyd's 2003 album Without Within.
  - Atmospheric vocalizations on the instrumental songs "Haleakala," "Behind The Veil," "As I Live And Breathe, "Final Approach," and "Matt's Mood" from Oster's 2005 album Released.
- Project Lo
  - Vocals on "Mercy Street" (Peter Gabriel cover) and "Perfection" from their 1995 album Black Canvas.
- Hansford Rowe
  - Vocals on "Rouler" from Rowe's 2003 album No Other.
- The Security Project
  - In October 2016, Rhodes joined The Security Project as lead vocalist, and they began including Kate Bush songs in their repertoire. Her first album with the group was Five (1 March 2017).
