= Equipoise =

Equipoise may refer to:

- Clinical equipoise, or the principle of equipoise, a medical research term
- Equilibrioception, the state of being balanced or in equilibrium
- Boldenone undecylenate, an anabolic steroid, by the trade name Equipoise
- Hydroxyzine, an antihistamine, by trade name Equipoise
- Equipoise (Happy Rhodes album), 1993
- Equipoise (Stanley Cowell album), 1979
- Equipoise (Larry Coryell album), 1985
- Equipoise (horse) (1928–1938), a thoroughbred racehorse
