= Rhodes Volume II =

Rhodes II

Studio album by Happy Rhodes
- Released: 1986
- Recorded: 1984–1986
- Genre: Alternative rock, art rock
- Length: 50 minutes
- Label: Aural Gratification
- Producer: Pat Tessitore; Happy Rhodes

Happy Rhodes chronology
| Rhodes I (1986) | Rhodes II (1986) | Rearmament (1986) |

Professional ratings
Review scores
| Source | Rating |
|---|---|
| AllMusic | 4.5/5 stars |

Rhodes II (1986) is the second album by American singer-songwriter Happy Rhodes.

== Overview ==
Her first four albums were not conceived and recorded as album releases, but were a gathering together of songs recorded at Cathedral Sound Studios from 1984 to 1986. When fellow musician Kevin Bartlett offered to release Rhodes' songs on his cassette-only personal label Aural Gratification, Rhodes culled through the songs she had recorded and ordered them to her satisfaction.

Rhodes I and Rhodes II are often considered to be a double album by fans because the songs are similar in musical style and lyrical subject matter. The songs on both albums are very acoustically orientated, with most songs consisting of Rhodes playing a guitar and singing. This is opposed to Rhodes' later albums, which rely more on her electronic talents.

Originally released as a cassette tape, each copy sold was a 1 to 1 real-time dub. Rhodes II was released on CD in 1992 with additional tracks.

== Track listing ==
All music, lyrics, voices, instruments and arrangements by Happy Rhodes.

1. "Come Here" – 3:55
2. "The Revelation" – 3:01
3. "Many Nights" – 2:50
4. "Under And Over The Brink" – 2:36
5. "Let Me Know, Love" – 3:23
6. "Where Do I Go?" – 3:25
7. "Not For Me" – 2:49
8. "One Alien" – 3:26
9. "No One Here" – 4:13
10. "To The Funny Farm" – 2:10
11. "Asylum Master" – 3:18
12. "Beat it Out" – 3:33
13. "The Chase" – 4:19
14. "Take Me With You" – 5:45 (CD bonus track, previously unreleased)
15. "Under And Over The Brink" – 2:32 ("barely salvaged from the vault") (CD bonus track, previously unreleased)
- 1986 tape US Aural Gratification AGC 0007 13 tracks, 50 minutes
- 1992 CD US Aural Gratification AGCD0007 15 tracks, 49:50 minutes

== Personnel ==
- Happy Rhodes – vocals, guitar, keyboards
- Recorded and mixed by Pat Tessitore at Cathedral Sound Studios in Rensselaer, New York.
