= Building the Colossus =

Building The Colossus

Studio album by Happy Rhodes
- Released: 1994
- Recorded: 1994
- Genre: Alternative rock, art rock
- Label: Aural Gratification
- Producer: Happy Rhodes; Kevin Bartlett

Happy Rhodes chronology
Rhodesongs (1993)	Building The Colossus (1994)	The Keep (1995)

Professional ratings
Review scores
Source	Rating
Allmusic	link

Building The Colossus (1994) is the eighth album by American singer-songwriter Happy Rhodes.

== Track listing ==
All music, lyrics, voices, instruments and arrangements - Happy Rhodes (except as noted in credits)

1. "Hold Me" - 4:40
2. "Just Like Tivoli" - 6:04
3. "Dying" - 5:44
4. "Collective Heart" - 4:43
5. "Building the Colossus" - 4:18
6. "Omar" - 4:47
7. "Pride" - 2:39
8. "You Never Told Me" - 5:03
9. "If I Ever See the Girl Again" - 5:33
10. "Down, Down" - 6:15
11. "Big Dreams, Big Life" - 2:31
12. "Glory" - 6:00
- Produced by Happy Rhodes and Kevin Bartlett
- Engineered by Pat Tessitore at Cathedral Sound Studios, Rensselaer, NY

== Personnel ==
- Happy Rhodes:
  - Vocals, Electronic Percussion, Keyboards, Nylon String Guitar, 12-String Guitar:, Acoustic Guitar, Synth Organ
- Kevin Bartlett:
  - Electric Guitar, E-Bow Guitar, 12-String Guitar, 6-Strong Guitar, Nukelele Island Guitar, Acoustic Guitar, Electronic Percussion, Bass, Electric Bass, Synth Bass, Wacka-Wacka, Keyboards
- David Torn:
  - Electronic Guitar, Electric Guitar, Seismic Anomalic Electric Guitar, Loops, Subliminal Guitar Loop,
- Jerry Marotta:
  - Drums, Toms, Percussion
- Dave Sepowski:
  - Electric Guitar
- Chuck D'Aloia:
  - Slide Guitars, Nylon String Guitar
- Peter Sheehan:
  - Additional Percussion
- Monica Wilson:
  - Cello

Chatter in "Glory" by: Happy Rhodes, Kelly Bird, Karen Campbell, Rachael Cooper, Theresa Burns Parkhurst, Amy Abdou, Abba Rage
