= California Guitar Trio =

American band

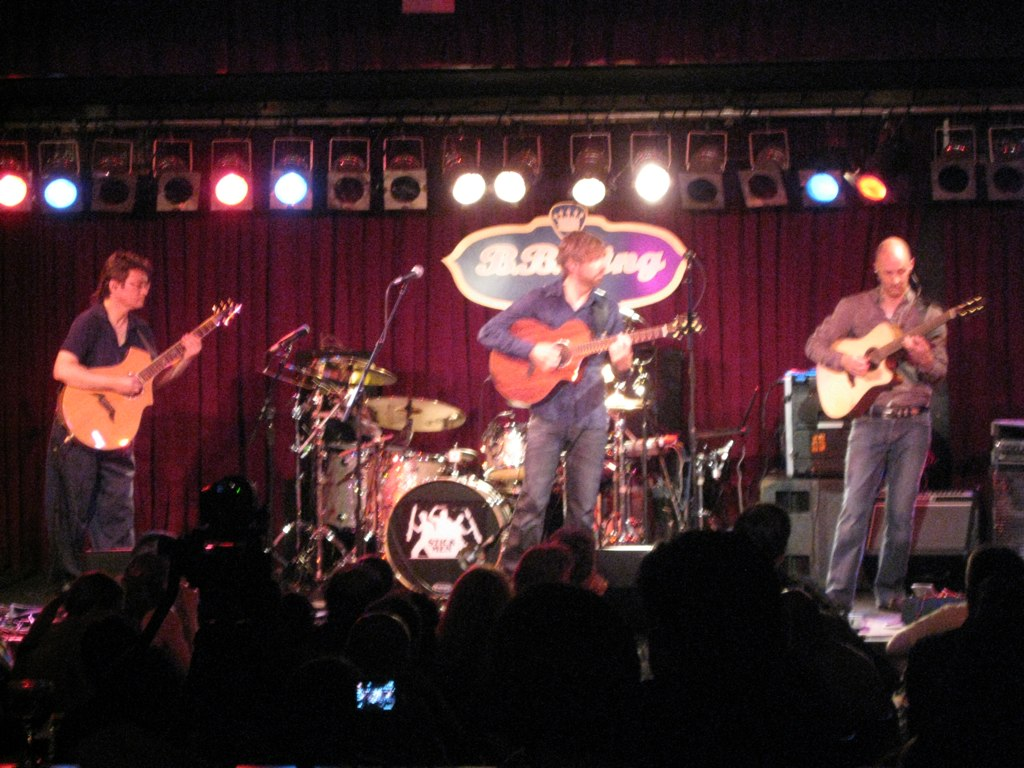
- California Guitar Trio live at The B.B. King Blues Club, New York

Background information
- Origin: Los Angeles, California, USA
- Genres: Instrumental rock, progressive rock, New Acoustic, new-age, chamber jazz, folk baroque
- Years active: 1991–present
- Labels: Inner Knot Records, InsideOut Music
- Members: Bert Lams; Hideyo Moriya (on hiatus), Paul Richards; Tom Griesgraber
- Website: https://cgtrio.com

California Guitar Trio (CGT) is an acoustic–electric band formed in Los Angeles in 1991 with the aim of expanding the potential of acoustic guitars played in the New standard tuning (NST) introduced by Robert Fripp on Guitar Craft courses. The California Guitar Trio's core lineup consisted of Paul Richards, Bert Lams, and Hideyo Moriya. Today's CGT lineup includes founding members Richards and Lams, with the addition of Tom Griesgraber, a Chapman Stick virtuoso. Highly regarded instrumentalists, the CGT have achieved worldwide renown for their eclectic repertoire, precision arrangements, and expansive sonic palette. The California Guitar Trio has toured globally for over three decades, performing more than 2,000 concerts. CGT has released 21 albums, with their music being streamed over 120 million times on Pandora, Spotify, Apple Music, and Amazon Music.

== History and formation ==
=== Formation: The California Project ===
The original members of California Guitar Trio met on the series of Robert Fripp's Guitar Craft courses in England in 1987. The three original members—Paul Richards of Salt Lake City, Utah, Bert Lams of Affligem, Belgium, and Hideyo Moriya of Tokyo, Japan—toured as part of Robert Fripp and The League of Crafty Guitarists. After completing the 1991 tour of Europe with the League of Crafty Guitarists, Fripp asked Lams to write down a list of musical aims, materials, strategy, and possible collaborators for what was called the California Project. Lams named two other Guitar Craft students as potential collaborators who would be willing to move temporarily to Los Angeles to work with him on this project based out of his home: Richards and Moriya. Thus the California Project ultimately became the California Guitar Trio. The first official performance of the California Guitar Trio took place on February 7, 1991. They continue to play in the New Standard Tuning using amplified acoustic guitars and various combinations of effects, guitar synthesizers and live loop recording as part of their performances. Their performances and recordings include original compositions, surf covers, and arrangements of classical music created for the New Standard Tuning and their tight interplay style known as "circulation" in the Guitar Craft parlance. Their influences include European classical music, rock, blues, jazz, world music, and surf music.

=== Robert Fripp String Quintet ===
In 1992 and 1993 with Fripp and Trey Gunn, they toured and recorded as The Robert Fripp String Quintet. Several recordings of those performances are available through Fripp's DGMLive website.

=== First albums on DGM Records ===
In 1991, the CGT self-released their self-titled demo album, recorded in Bert Lams' home just outside Hollywood, California. The recordings on this release were remastered by Tony Arnold and augmented with two additional tracks to form their first CD released on Fripp's Discipline Global Mobile record label (now Inner Knot Records), the 1993 album Yamanashi Blues,

In 1995, the trio were invited by physicist and Nobel Laureate Murray Gell-Mann to record at his residence near Lamy, New Mexico. The resulting album Invitation includes pieces that were inspired by the landscape ("Train to Lamy Suite"), and arrangements of pieces inspired by their surroundings, such as the theme from "The Good, the Bad and the Ugly" and "Apache".

Later in 1995, Fripp asked the trio to be the opening act for King Crimson. CGT opened for King Crimson for more than 130 shows in the US, Europe and Japan, exposing their music to a global audience. A sample of these performances were released on their album An Opening Act.

In 1998, CGT released Pathways, in similar format to the first two albums, with combinations of original compositions, arrangements of classical pieces, and surf guitar songs.

=== Collaborative era ===
In 1999, the trio began touring with bassist and Stick player Tony Levin whom they had met on their tours with King Crimson. Levin appears on the CGT albums Rocks The West and Monday Night in San Francisco, and contemporaneously invited CGT to play his album Waters of Eden. Other collaborators of the time included saxophonist Bill Janssen and percussionist Jarrod Kaplan.

In 2001, CGT toured with Tony Levin and King Crimson drummer Pat Mastelotto. After the tour, they released a live recording from this tour (Live at The Key Club) and recorded the album CG3+2 in Austin, Texas with Levin and Mastelotto. 2001 also saw the release of 10 Christmas Songs, which has accounted for some of the most popular CGT renditions on streaming services such as Spotify and Pandora (streaming service).

In August 2004, they released Whitewater, produced by Tony Levin. It features mainly original works of the CGT, offset by a circulation arrangement of a Bach prelude and a mashup of "(Ghost) Riders in the Sky" with The Doors' "Riders on the Storm." During this period, CGT began touring with their own sound engineer, Tyler Trotter. Trotter would often accompany the trio on melodica during live improvisations and performances of Tubular Bells.

The next studio release by CGT was 2008's Echoes, with reworkings of other artists' songs, such as Pink Floyd's Echoes, Tubular Bells by Mike Oldfield, Music For a Found Harmonium, and Queen's Bohemian Rhapsody, which became a staple of their live performances. This was followed in 2010 by Andromeda, the first CGT album with all original compositions. Trotter served as co-producer and engineer of both albums.

=== Montreal Guitar Trio ===
In 2009, CGT performed their first shows with the Montréal Guitar Trio. The album Montreal Guitar Trio + California Guitar Trio captures these first live performances, with each trio performing their own works and playing as a sextet for the encore. They toured together on a shared bill, and in 2019 recorded In A Landscape, showcasing all six musicians playing together as a single ensemble.

=== 2012 to present ===
The 2012 release, Masterworks, is an all classical music compilation featuring music by Beethoven, Bach, Vivaldi, Rossini and Arvo Pärt. Guitarist Fareed Haque played on Vivaldi's "Winter", and Tony Levin played upright bass and cello on four tracks.

The next album was the 2016 release of Komorebi, which was the first CGT album to utilize crowdfunding to offset the production costs. The album is notable for its purely acoustic sound, whereas most previous CGT recordings featured some use of audio effects, amplification, loops and synthesized sounds integrated with acoustic guitars. It was recorded by Tom Griesgraber in his Encinitas, California studio. Mastering for this album was done by Brian Lucey, another Guitar Craft student and notable mastering engineer and producer.

Their latest studio album is 2020's Elegy, and a subsequent tour was planned and later rescheduled as a result of the global COVID-19 pandemic. The group resumed touring in July 2021 as an opening act for King Crimson, followed by a brief tour of the US in the fall of 2021.

== Members ==
The three founding members of California Guitar Trio recorded and performed together continuously from 1991 until 2020. When the trio were asked to open for King Crimson on their 2021 US tour, Moriya was unable to accompany them. Stick player, producer and recording engineer Tom Griesgraber, who had collaborated with CGT as an opening act, record producer and touring/recording partner with Bert Lams, was asked to step in as the third touring member in the summer of 2021. Griesgraber has been a touring member of the band since. As of 2022, Moriya is on hiatus as a touring member of CGT.

The members of CGT all reside in different places but continue to come together for touring and recording projects. Richards lives in West Hollywood, California; Lams resides in Jupiter, Florida; Moriya lives in Chiba-ken, Japan; Griesgraber lives in Encinitas, California.

== Tours ==
California Guitar Trio maintains an exhaustive list of their appearances on their website dating back to their first formal show in February, 1991. In February, 2022, they will have performed more than 2,000 live shows since their inception.

== Notable collaborations ==
The following artists have appeared on CGT recordings:

- Bonnie Prince Billy on Echoes
- Nora Germain on Komorebi
- Tom Griesgraber on Andromeda and Komorebi
- Trey Gunn on Invitation
- Petra Haden on Komorebi
- Fareed Haque on Masterworks
- Bill Janssen on Rocks The West
- Tony Levin on Rocks The West, Monday Night in San Francisco, Live at the Key Club, CG3+2, Masterworks, Andromeda Komorebi, Elegy
- Pat Mastelotto on Live at the Key Club, CG3+2
- Fabio Mittino on Elegy
- Davide Rossi on Komorebi and Elegy
- Eric Slick and Julie Slick on Echoes and Andromeda
- Tyler Trotter on Echoes and Andromeda

== Appearances on other artists' recordings ==
- 1995 Alice's album Charade
- 2000 Waters of Eden on Tony Levin's album Waters of Eden
- 2003 Grammy Awards–nominated track "Apollo" on Tony Levin's Pieces of the Sun.

=== Opening acts and shared bills ===
In addition to their collaborations, California Guitar Trio have shared the stage as either an opening act or headlining performance with musicians as varied as King Crimson, John McLaughlin, Jerry Marotta, David Sylvian, Tito Puente, Leftover Salmon, Taj Mahal, Guy Pratt, Steve Lukather, Simon Phillips, Adrian Legg, Jon Anderson, the California Symphony, Monte Montgomery, Enchant, Spock's Beard, The Flower Kings, Slash's Snakepit, Rick Wakeman, The Flower Kings, Primus, Zoë Keating, Adrian Belew Power Trio, Jake Shimabukuro and Trace Bundy.

=== Lams side projects ===
In 2005, Lams released Nascent, a collection of Bach preludes and violin partitas transcribed for the guitar in New Standard Tuning.

Chapman Stick player Tom Griesgraber opened for CGT on several beginning in 2005. As an offshoot of this collaboration, Griesgraber and Lams began a series of smaller tours and "house concerts" starting in 2008. In 2012 they released the album Unnamed Lands.

Lams, along with Italian guitarist Fabio Mittino have recorded and toured as a duet performing the music of George Gurdjieff and Thomas de Hartmann. They have released three albums to date.

== Discography ==
California Guitar Trio has released 22 albums, including twelve studio albums with a mixture of original CGT compositions, classical arrangements and cover songs and seven live albums.

California Guitar Trio are also feature players in the Robert Fripp String Quintet, which included Robert Fripp and Trey Gunn. The three founding members of CGT can also be heard on two albums recorded by Robert Fripp and The League of Crafty Guitarists.

=== Studio albums ===
- The California Guitar Trio (1991)
- Yamanashi Blues (1993)
- Invitation (1995)
- Pathways (1998)
- 10 Christmas Songs (2001)
- CG3+2 (featuring Tony Levin and Pat Mastelotto) (2002)
- A Christmas Album (2002)
- Whitewater (2004)
- Echoes (2008)
- Andromeda (2010)
- Masterworks (2011)
- Komorebi (2016)
- Elegy (2020)

=== Live CGT albums ===
- An Opening Act: Live on Tour with King Crimson (1999)
- Rocks the West (2000)
- Monday Night in San Francisco (2000)
- Live at the Key Club (2001)
- Live at Freight and Salvage 2011 (first released 2021)
- Live in Scottsdale On Tour with King Crimson (2021)

=== Compilations ===
- The First Decade (compilation) (2003)
- Highlights (compilation) (2007)

=== with Montreal Guitar Trio ===
- Montreal Guitar Trio + California Guitar Trio Live (2011)
- In a Landscape (2019)

=== with the Robert Fripp String Quintet ===
- The Bridge Between (1993)

=== with Robert Fripp & The League of Crafty Guitarists ===
- Show of Hands (1990)
- Intergalactic Boogie Express – Live in Europe 1991 (1995)
