= Rearmament (album) =

Studio album by Happy Rhodes
- Released: 1986
- Recorded: 1984–1986
- Genre: alternative rock, art rock
- Length: 62:24
- Label: Aural Gratification
- Producer: Pat Tessitore, Happy Rhodes

Happy Rhodes chronology
Rhodes II (1986)	Rearmament (1986)	Ecto (1987)

Professional ratings
Review scores
Source	Rating
Allmusic	3/5 stars

Rearmament is the third album by American singer-songwriter Happy Rhodes, released in 1986.

== Overview ==
Rhodes' first four albums were not conceived and recorded as album releases, but were a gathering together of songs recorded at Cathedral Sound Studios from 1984 to 1986. When fellow musician Kevin Bartlett offered to release the songs on his cassette-only personal label Aural Gratification, Rhodes culled through the songs she had recorded and ordered them to her satisfaction.

Originally released as a cassette tape, each copy sold was a 1 to 1 real-time dub. Rearmament was released on CD in 1992 with additional tracks.

== Track listing ==
All music, lyrics, voices, instruments and arrangements by Happy Rhodes.

1. "Perfect Irony" – 3:59
2. "For We Believe" – 2:46
3. "I Am a Legend" – 4:05
4. "'Til the Dawn Breaks" – 5:53
5. "The Issue Is" – 3:21
6. "Friend You'll Be" – 3:36
7. "Dreams Are" – 5:41
8. "Box H.A.P." – 3:01
9. "I Have a Heart" – 4:41
10. "Crystal Orbs" – 3:41
11. "Because I Learn" – 3:39
12. "Baby Don't Go" – 4:10
13. "Rhodes Waltz" – 2:36
14. "Ally, Ally Oxen Free" – 5:40
15. "Be Careful What You Say" – 5:35

== Personnel ==
- Happy Rhodes – vocals, guitar, keyboards
