= Banda do Casaco =

Banda do Casaco was a Portuguese prog-folk band active from 1974 to 1984 considered by some to be one of Portugal's greatest progressive rock bands. Their seminal album was Hoje há Conquilhas, Amanhã não Sabemos, released in 1976.

== Beginnings ==
After the failure of the Filarmónica Fraude project, António Pinho (singer) and Luís Linhares (keys) joined the ex Plexus members Nuno Rodrigues (vocals and guitar) and Celso de Carvalho (cello and double bass) to form the group Banda do Casaco. Many guest musicians passed through the band in their active period and many used the band as a springboard for their own careers.

== Career ==
The first album released was Dos Benefícios dum Vendido no Reino dos Bonifácios in 1975, followed by Coisas do Arco da Velha in 1976 which won the "Album of the Year" award in Portugal, notable for the appearance of Cândida Branca Flor on vocals. The singer would leave Banda do Casaco to pursue a successful solo career. Their most renowned and considered by some, their most experimental, album was their 1977 release Hoje há Conquilhas, Amanhã não Sabemos which featured António Pinheiro da Silva on guitar, Rão Kyao on saxophone and Gabriela Schaaf on vocals. They went on to release Contos da Barbearia in 1978 followed by No Jardim da Celeste in 1981 which featured the inclusion of female singer Né Ladeiras and Jerry Marotta, Peter Gabriel's former drummer. The band played live on only three occasions: at Aula Magna, Festa de S. Mateus in Viseu and Casa do Povo in Cacia. In 1982 Pinho left the group to write for girl band Doce but the band continued and released Também Eu in 1982. The band's final studio album was Com Ti Chitas, released in 1984, which featured Ti Chitas (Catarina Sergentina). The group disbanded shortly after.

== Style ==
The group joined traditional Portuguese folk music with progressive rock and their lyrics were often satirical and included social criticism, approaching the idea of crossing modern urbanisation with Portuguese rural history. The band consisted of eight members with instruments including brass, keyboards, strings (violin, cello, contra bass) and vocals (two female vocalists: Judi Brennan and Helena Afonso).

== Modern day ==
In 1993, Universal Music re-released the band's first two albums on CD. In November 2006, their third album, Hoje Há Conquilhas, Amanhã Não Sabemos, was also re-released by the Companhia Nacional de Música.

== Discography ==
Year	Name	Format
1975	Dos Benefícios dum Vendido no Reino dos Bonifácios	vinyl
1976	Coisas do Arco da Velha	vinyl
1977	Hoje Há Conquilhas, Amanhã Não Sabemos	vinyl
1978	Contos da Barbearia	vinyl
1980	No Jardim da Celeste	vinyl
1982	Também Eu	vinyl / CD
1984	Com Ti Chitas	CD

=== Compilations ===
Year	Name	Format
1996	Natação Obrigatória	CD
