= Outeiro do Circo =

Bronze Age site in Beja, Portugal

- View of the site and the 2026 archaeological dig
- Interactive map of Outeiro do Circo
- 38°02′15″N 8°00′47″W
- Type: Bronze Age settlement
- Periods: Bronze Age, Iron Age
- Location: Beringel, Beja District, Portugal

Site notes
- Area: 17 ha (42 acres)
- Circumference: 2150m
- Excavation dates: 1989; 2008–2011; 2013–2015; 2016; 2019–2023; 2026
- Archaeologists: Sofia Silva, Miguel Serra, and Eduardo Porfírio (2019–2021); Nelson J. Almeida (2026– )
- Condition: Poor
- Public access: During excavations

The Outeiro do Circo settlement, also known as Cerro dos Muros, is a Bronze Age archaeological site located between the parishes of Beringel and Mombeja in the municipality of Beja, Portugal. As of 2026 it was the subject of archaeological excavation and could be visited on the days on which excavation was taking place.

== Description ==
Outeiro do Circo is located in the area known as Cabeços da Corte Garrana in the municipality of Beja. It is situated on top of a hill that is part of a group of low hillocks, approximately 250m to 276m high, which stand out well in the surrounding plain. It occupies about 17 hectares and is surrounded by walls, in some case double walls. It is one of the largest such settlements in the Iberian Peninsula.

The archaeological site is in a very poor state of conservation, with few remains having been identified to date. These include a section of walls, and several possible stone and fired clay embankments, which could have been part of a defensive system. Lidar imaging shows that the walls go around the whole site (about 850m long by 200m wide), and that there were two large towers at the entrance with a possible second entrance at the far end. Several ceramic objects have been found at the site, including cups with treated surfaces, nipple pads, and ornate rims, part of a decorated body, glazed pottery, fragments of terra sigillata, and items from buildings, such as roof tiles. Fashioned stones were also identified, such as spheroid-shaped pieces that could be used as projectiles, quartzite flakes, and a rounded piece of schist. In terms of decorative pieces, white beads have been identified. Some Iron Age artifacts have also been discovered.

== History ==
The Outeiro do Circo settlement was likely to have been occupied between around 1250 and 850 BCE, during a period corresponding to the Late Bronze Age, close to the period of transition to the Iron Age. Carbon dating has placed the settlement at about 1100 BCE. The large number of archaeological sites in the municipality of Beja suggests that this area must have been very important between 2000 and 800 BCE, experiencing extensive human occupation during this period that was linked to the exploitation of abundant natural resources.

== Archaeological excavations ==
The site was subject to archaeological research, including excavations and test digs in 1989, 2008 to 2011, and 2013 to 2015. In the summer of 2016 another phase of excavations began, in which archaeologists and archaeology students from several Portuguese and international universities collaborated, including those from Spain, Canada, and Bulgaria. The site has proven of great interest to the scientific community, and by 2019 more than 40 articles about it had already been published.

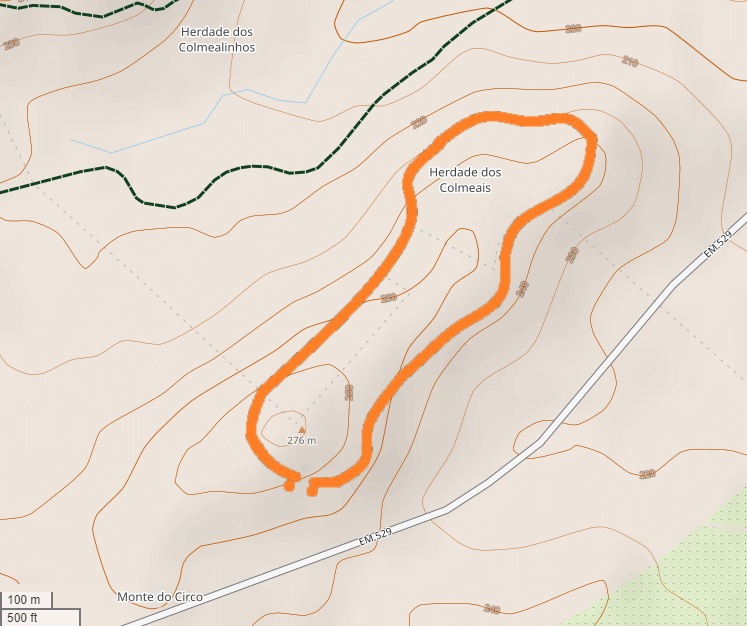
Approximate layout of the walls, with the entrance in the southwest corner, protected by turrets

In August 2019, a new campaign was initiated at the site, agreed between the municipality of Beja and Palimpsesto, a Portuguese company that specializes in archaeology and the preservation of cultural heritage. This collaboration resulted in several excavations between 2019 and 2023, which were entrusted to three archaeologists from the University of Coimbra, Sofia Silva, Miguel Serra, and Eduardo Porfírio. It was planned that the excavations would be carried out mainly within the old urban perimeter of the settlement, in an area where traces of residential occupation had already been found. Activities also included guided tours of the archaeological works, conferences and sessions for young people during school holidays.

In August 2020, a new excavation campaign took place at the site, integrated into the programme initiated in 2019, with the main discovery being part of a Bronze Age wall, alongside which evidence of the Iron Age was also found. In August 2026, excavations resumed as part of a new research program for the site, coordinated by Nelson J. Almeida of the University of Évora. His team excavated two additional sections of the wall and examined construction techniques. One section revealed a buttressing ramp, made of fired clay, while both sections showed a ditch at the bottom, with large stones acting as reinforcements.
