= Metropolitan Suite =

Studio album by Synergy
- Released: November 1987
- Genre: Electronic
- Length: 43:38 (vinyl edition); 48:07 (CD edition)
- Label: Audion
- Producer: Larry Fast

Synergy chronology
Semi-Conductor (1984)	Metropolitan Suite (1987)	Reconstructed Artifacts (2003)

Professional ratings
Review scores
Source	Rating
Allmusic	3/5 stars

Metropolitan Suite is an album by electronic music composer Larry Fast, released in 1987 through Audion Records. It is the ninth and final record in his Synergy project.

== Track listing ==
All music is composed by Larry Fast

Side one
No.	Title	Length
1.	"Into the Abyss"	7:18
2.	"Prairie Light"	6:54
3.	"West Side Nights"	8:15

Side two
No.	Title	Length
1.	"North River"	1:20
2.	"Steam and Steel Towers"	6:15
3.	"The City Goes to War"	6:17
4.	"Metropolitan Theme (Main Theme)"	4:09
5.	"The End of an Era"	3:10

CD Version
No.	Title	Length
1.	"Metropolitan Suite: I. North River"	1:20
2.	"Metropolitan Suite: II. Steam and Steel Towers"	6:15
3.	"Metropolitan Suite: III. The City Goes to War"	6:17
4.	"Metropolitan Suite: IV. Metropolitan Theme (Main Theme)"	4:09
5.	"Metropolitan Suite: V. The End of an Era"	3:10
6.	"Into the Abyss"	7:18
7.	"Prairie Light"	6:54
8.	"West Side Nights"	8:15
9.	"Redstone"	4:27

== Personnel ==
- Murray Brenman – illustrations, design
- Larry Fast – instruments, production, engineering, illustrations
- Bob Ludwig – mastering
- Neil Nappe – engineering assistant
- Miguel Pagliere – photography
- Bill Parker – light sculpture
- Pete Turner – photography
