= Stick Man (album) =

Studio album by Tony Levin
- Released: September 25, 2007
- Recorded: 2007
- Genre: Progressive rock, progressive metal
- Length: 58:15
- Label: Lazy Bones Recordings
- Producer: Scott Schorr & Tony Levin

Tony Levin chronology
Resonator (2006)	Stick Man (2007)

Stick Man is Tony Levin's sixth studio album published in 2007. The album showcases Levin's skills on the Chapman Stick, as well as the electric bass and NS Upright bass. Most of the seventeen tracks are instrumental, though there are three songs with vocals by Levin. King Crimson bandmate Pat Mastelotto plays drums on eleven of the tracks.

== Track listing ==
All compositions by Tony Levin.

1. "Welcome" – 4:12
2. "Gut String Theory" – 3:27
3. "Speedbump" – 2:48
4. "Slow Glide" – 4:00
5. "Shraag" – 4:25
6. "Not Just Another Pretty Bass" – 3:22
7. "El Mercado" – 2:27
8. "Orange Alert" – 2:32
9. "In her Locket" – 3:58
10. "Rising Waters" – 3:16
11. "Metro" – 4:21
12. "Zeros to Disk" – 3:23
13. "Sticky Fingers" – 2:27
14. "Rivers of Light" – 4:24
15. "Chop Shop" – 2:53
16. "The Gorgon Sisters Have a Chat" – 2:31
17. "Dark Blues" – 3:39

== Personnel ==
- Tony Levin – lead vocals, cello, bass guitar, Chapman stick, NS Upright bass, piano, keyboards
- Chris Albers – acoustic guitar
- Pat Mastelotto – drums & percussion
- Scott Schorr – drums & percussion, keyboards, synthesizer
- Tim Dow – drums
