= Find Me (Happy Rhodes album) =

Studio album by Happy Rhodes
- Released: October 19, 2007
- Recorded: 2001, New York City, New York
- Genre: Alternative rock, pop rock
- Producer: Bob Muller

Happy Rhodes chronology
Many Worlds Are Born Tonight (1998)	Find Me (2007)

Find Me is an album by American singer, musician and songwriter Happy Rhodes, released on October 19, 2007, and serves as her most recent studio album to date. Rhodes collaborated with artists who made contributions to the album, these include guitarist Bon Lozaga and bassist Hansford Rowe of Gongzilla, bassist Carl Adami, guitarists Teddy Kumpel and Jon Catler and pianist Rob Schwimmer.

== Overview ==
Rhodes’ 11th studio album to be released, the songs were originally recorded in 2001 but due to the costs of mastering, the album was not released on public sale until October 2007. There are currently no singles released from the album and Rhodes had made no claims to be releasing one.

To assist with the costs of recording and producing the CD herself, Rhodes released a “sampler” disc to fans in 2005 which consisted of 8 tracks from the album. These discs were sold at Rhodes’ live performances in January 2005 at the Tin Angel in Philadelphia, PA. The left over discs were sold on the Ecto mailing list, selling out quickly. The sampler album is no longer available.

A 12th song was recorded – named “Shutdown” – but Rhodes did not include it on the final release of the album.

== Track listing ==
All songs are written by Happy Rhodes.

1. ”One and Many” – 4:34
2. ”Little Brother” – 4:35
3. ”Find Me” – 5:13
4. ”She Won’t Go” – 3:56
5. ”Here and Hereafter” – 4:18
6. ”Charlie” – 4:01
7. ”Can’t Let Go” – 5:29
8. ”Queen” – 4:35
9. ”Treehouse” – 6:22
10. ”Chosen One” – 3:46
11. ”Fall” – 4:49

== Personnel ==
- Happy Rhodes – vocals, acoustic guitar, programming, artwork
- Bob Muller - drums & percussion, yangquin (hammered dulcimer)
- Hansford Rowe - bass guitar (on 1, 4, 5, 6, 7, 8 & 10)
- Teddy Kumpel - electric guitar, tamburica (lute) & acoustic guitar (on 5)
- Rob Schwimmer – piano
- Carl Adami - bass guitar (on 9 & 11)
- Jon Catler - fretless electric guitar (on 7)
- Trey Gunn - Warr touch guitar (on 8)
- Bon Lozaga - electric guitar (on 5)
- Fab - programming & orchestrations (on 2 & 10)
- Michael Seifert - orchestrations (on 7)
