= The Security Project =

American cover band

The Security Project is a band that started performing in 2012 in recognition of the 30th anniversary of the release of the album Security by Peter Gabriel. The band performs Gabriel's early progressive repertoire, generally taking material from his first four albums.. Notable members of the band include drummer Jerry Marotta (who played on some tracks of the latter three of those first four albums, and toured with Gabriel for ten years), Warr guitarist Trey Gunn (former member of King Crimson) and guitarist Michael Cozzi (former member of Shriekback).

In October 2016, the band added Happy Rhodes as lead vocalist, and began including Kate Bush songs in their repertoire.
