= The Keep (Happy Rhodes album) =

Compilation album by Happy Rhodes
- Released: 1995
- Recorded: 1995
- Genre: Alternative rock, Art rock
- Label: Aural Gratification
- Producer: Kevin Bartlett

Happy Rhodes chronology
Building the Colossus (1994)	The Keep (1995)	Many Worlds Are Born Tonight (1998)

Professional ratings
Review scores
Source	Rating
Allmusic	4.5/5 stars

The Keep (1995) is the ninth album by American singer-songwriter Happy Rhodes.

== Overview ==
A compilation of acoustic versions of previously released songs, and rarities 1984–1995.

== Track listing ==
All music, lyrics, voices, instruments and arrangements - Happy Rhodes (except as noted in credits)

1. "Temporary And Eternal" - 5:33
2. "Life On Mars" - 3:20
3. "Collective Heart" - 4:45
4. "The Yes Medley" - 6:05
5. "Save Our Souls" - 6:00
6. "Flash Me Up" - 2:14
7. "For We Believe" - 2:34
8. "Summer" - 3:28
9. "Oh Holy Night" - 3:27
10. "Look For The Child" - 4:20
11. "Hold Me" - 3:25
12. "Bye Moon" - 2:07
13. "Prey Of The Strange" - 3:36
14. "Oh Hand Of Mine" - 3:49
- Album Produced by Kevin Bartlett.
- Individual songs Produced by
  - Happy Rhodes
  - Happy Rhodes and Kevin Bartlett
  - John Diliberto
  - Bruce Raines
  - John Patoubas

== Personnel ==
- Happy Rhodes:
  - Vocals, Nylon Guitar, Acoustic Guitar
- Kevin Bartlett:
  - Electric Guitar, Loops, Effects
- Carl Adami:
  - Bass, Devices
- Dean Sharp:
  - Percussion
- Kelly Bird:
  - Backing vocals, Acoustic Guitar

"The Yes Medley":
"I Sleep Alone" written by Trevor Rabin. Published by Uni/Chappell Music, Warnell Chappell Music
"Soon" written by Jon Anderson. Published by Topographic Music BMI
"Endless Dream" written by Trevor Rabin, Jon Anderson. Published by Tremander's Songs BMI and Fizz Music Ltd., Warner Bros. Music Corp. ASCAP
"Hearts" written by Jon Anderson, Trevor Rabin, Chris Squire, Alan White, Tony Kaye. Published by Affirmative Music BMI
