= Many Worlds Are Born Tonight =

Studio album by Happy Rhodes
- Released: 1998
- Recorded: 1997
- Genre: Alternative rock, art rock
- Label: Samson Music
- Producer: Happy Rhodes

Happy Rhodes chronology
| The Keep (1995) | Many Worlds Are Born Tonight (1998) | Find Me (2007) |

Professional ratings
Review scores
| Source | Rating |
|---|---|
| Allmusic | link |

Many Worlds Are Born Tonight (1998) is the tenth album by American singer-songwriter Happy Rhodes.

== Overview ==
Rhodes' first album on a larger independent label (Samson Music), leading to the All-Music Guide reviewer mistakenly describing this as her debut album.

"Roy (Back from the Offworld)" is the only Happy Rhodes track to have ever charted thus far (August 2007) - peaking at #42 on the Billboard Hot Dance/Club Play chart. 1

== Track listing ==
All music, lyrics, voices, arrangements, sequencing, programming, sampling - Happy Rhodes (unless otherwise noted in album credits)

1. "100 Years" - 5:25
2. "Many Worlds Are Born Tonight" - 4:52
3. "The Chariot" - 5:22
4. "Ra Is a Busy God" - 6:21
5. "If Wishes Were Horses, How Beggars Would Ride" - 5:02
6. "Roy (Back from the Offworld)" - 5:33
7. "Tragic" - 6:09
8. "Proof" - 4:22
9. "Looking Over Cliffs" - 4:57
10. "Winter" - 3:58
11. "Serenading Genius" - 6:37
12. "How It Should Be" - 4:19 (German CD only)
- Produced by Happy Rhodes.
- Engineered by Happy Rhodes with additional tracking by Kevin Bartlett at Aural Gratification
- All vocals engineered by Kevin Bartlett

== Personnel ==
- Happy Rhodes - Nylon String Guitar, 12 String Guitar, Hand Percussion
- Kevin Bartlett - Harmonic, Shadow and Original E-bow, Bass, Bass Loops, Drippy Bass, Hand Percussion, Jug, Vase, Linguini Grill, Log Drums, Bongos, Mini Djembe, Chime
- Jerry Marotta - Drums, Barney Rubble Drums, Nails of Goat and "Oh"
- Carl Adami - Bass, Bass Loopie Things
- Rob Taylor - Violin
- Kelly Bird, Mitch Elrod - Additional Voices on "Proof"

== Samples ==
  - Peter Siedlaczeks' Classical Choir
  - David Torn's Tonal Textures #22
  - Gota Yashiki's Groove Activator
  - Project Lo's Dabblings In Darkness, "Three Rivers Of Lor"
  - David Torn's Tonal Textures #6,
  - Rich Goodhart's Never Give A Sword To A Man Who Can't Dance, "Ritual Dreaming" Copyright 1995
  - SSS Laidback Drumtools
  - Big Fish Audio's Loopalicious and Drum Loops 3
  - Trevor Rabin's Can't Look Away "Something To Hold On To" Copyright 1989
  - "Warrior Songs" - Purchased on the streets of N.Y.C from an American Indian...
  - Rarefaction's A Poke In The Ear With A Sharp Stick ...Voice.
  - David Torn's Tonal Textures, #'s 20, 23 and 27
