= Ecto (album) =

Studio album by Happy Rhodes
- Released: 1987
- Recorded: 1984–1986
- Genre: alternative rock, art rock
- Length: 67:56
- Label: Aural Gratification
- Producer: Pat Tessitore, Happy Rhodes

Happy Rhodes chronology
Rearmament (1986)	Ecto (1987)	Warpaint (1991)

Professional ratings
Review scores
Source	Rating
Allmusic	3/5 stars

Ecto is the fourth album by American singer-songwriter Happy Rhodes, released in 1987.

== Overview ==
Rhodes' first four albums were not conceived and recorded as album releases, but were a gathering together of songs recorded at Cathedral Sound Studios from 1984 to 1986. When fellow musician Kevin Bartlett offered to release Rhodes' songs on his cassette-only personal label Aural Gratification, Rhodes culled through the songs she had recorded and ordered them to her satisfaction.

Originally released as a cassette tape, each copy sold was a 1 to 1 real-time dub. Ecto was released on CD in 1992 with additional tracks. The bonus track When The Rain Came Down was uploaded to the file sharing network Napster by an unknown person, and misidentified as a duet between Kate Bush and Annie Lennox, two singers who (as of July 2007) have never worked together.

== Track listing ==
All music, lyrics, voices, instruments and arrangements by Happy Rhodes.

1. "I'm Going Back" – 4:18
2. "If Love Is A Game, I Win" – 5:32
3. "Would That I Could" – 4:11
4. "Off From Out From Under Me" – 3:53
5. "Project 499" – 2:13
6. "I Won't Break Down" – 3:28
7. "If So" – 3:36
8. "Ecto" – 4:40
9. "I Cannot Go On" – 4:07
10. "Ode" – 4:10
11. "Don't Want To Hear It" – 4:56
12. "Poetic Justice" – 2:59
13. "To Be E. Mortal" – 8:15
14. "Look For The Child" – 5:54 (CD bonus track, previously unreleased)
15. "When The Rain Came Down" – 5:44 (CD bonus track, previously unreleased)

== Personnel ==
- Happy Rhodes – vocals, guitar, keyboards
