= Beringel =

- Civil parish
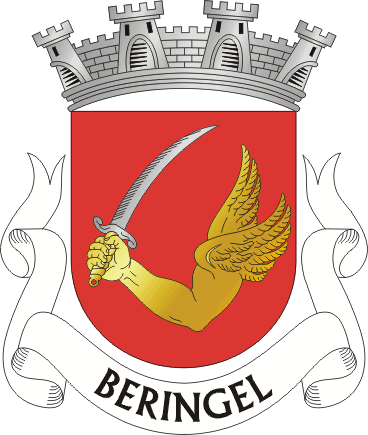
- Coat of arms

- Location in Portugal
- Coordinates: 38.056°N 7.985°W
- Country: Portugal
- Region: Alentejo
- Intermunic. comm.: Baixo Alentejo
- District: Beja
- Municipality: Beja

Area
  - Total: 15.04 km^{2} (5.81 sq mi)

Population (2011)
  - Total: 1,301
  - Density: 86.50/km^{2} (224.0/sq mi)
- Time zone: UTC+00:00 (WET)
  - Summer (DST): UTC+01:00 (WEST)

Beringel is a town (vila) and parish (freguesia) in Beja Municipality, Alentejo in Southern Portugal. The population in 2011 was 1,301, in an area of 15.04 km^{2}.

Three famous Portuguese singers were born in Beringel: António Zambujo, Cândida Branca Flor and Linda de Suza.

Close to Beringel is the site of the large Bronze Age settlement known as the Outeiro do Circo.
