= Rhodes Volume I =

Rhodes I

Studio album by Happy Rhodes
- Released: 1986
- Recorded: 1984–1986
- Genre: Alternative rock, art rock
- Length: 45 minutes
- Label: Aural Gratification
- Producer: Pat Tessitore; Happy Rhodes

Happy Rhodes chronology
Rhodes I (1986)	Rhodes II (1986)

Professional ratings
Review scores
Source	Rating
Allmusic	4.5/5 stars

Rhodes I (1986) is the first album by American singer-songwriter Happy Rhodes.

== Overview ==
Her first four albums were not conceived and recorded as album releases, but were a gathering together of songs recorded at Cathedral Sound Studios from 1984 to 1986. When fellow musician Kevin Bartlett offered to release Rhodes' songs on his cassette-only personal label Aural Gratification, Rhodes culled through the songs she had recorded and ordered them to her satisfaction.

Rhodes I and Rhodes II are often considered to be a double album by fans because the songs are similar in musical style and lyrical subject matter. The songs on both albums are very acoustically orientated, with most songs consisting of Rhodes playing a guitar and singing. This is opposed to Rhodes' later albums, which rely more on her electronic talents.

Originally released as a cassette tape, each copy sold was a 1 to 1 real-time dub. Rhodes I was released on CD in 1992 with additional tracks.

== Track listing ==
All music, lyrics, voices, instruments and arrangements by Happy Rhodes, except "Possessed" music by Happy Rhodes, lyrics by Dave Snyder

1. "Rainkeeper" – 2:24
2. "Oh The Drears" – 3:17
3. "Given In" – 4:14
4. "He's Alive" – 4:22
5. "Possessed" – 2:55
6. "I'll Let You Go" – 3:59
7. "Number One" – 2:49
8. "Case of Glass" – 3:39
9. "Moonbeam Friends" – 2:49
10. "I'm Not Awake, I'm Not Asleep" – 3:23
11. "The First to Cry" – 3:00
12. "Step Inside" – 3:46
13. "The Wretches Gone Awry" – 2:36
14. "The Flaming Threshold" – 4:39 (CD bonus track, previously unreleased)
15. "Suicide Song" – 2:24 (CD bonus track, previously unreleased)

1986 cassette:13 tracks, 45 minutes
1992 CD 15 tracks, 50:15 minutes

== Personnel ==
- Happy Rhodes: Vocals, Guitar

Recorded and Mixed by Pat Tessitore at Cathedral Sound Studios in Rensselaer, NY.
