= Warpaint (Happy Rhodes album) =

Studio album by Happy Rhodes
- Released: 1991
- Recorded: 1991
- Genre: alternative rock, art rock
- Length: 54:33
- Label: Aural Gratification
- Producer: Kevin Bartlett, Happy Rhodes

Happy Rhodes chronology
Ecto (1987)	Warpaint (1991)	Equipoise (1993)

Professional ratings
Review scores
Source	Rating
Allmusic	3/5 stars

Warpaint is the fifth album by American singer-songwriter Happy Rhodes, released in 1991. It is the first of Rhodes' albums to feature musicians other than herself.

== Track listing ==
1. "Waking Up" – 4:06
2. "Feed The Fire" – 4:33
3. "Murder" – 4:55
4. "To Live In Your World" – 3:33
5. "Phobos" – 5:13
6. "Wrong Century" – 4:25
7. "Lay Me Down" – 3:51
8. "Terra Incognita" – 4:33
9. "All Things (Mia ia io)" – 4:48
10. "Words Weren't Made For Cowards" – 5:22
11. "Warpaint" – 6:15
12. "In Hiding" – 3:12

== Personnel ==
- Happy Rhodes – vocals, keyboards, percussion
- Kevin Bartlett – guitars, keyboards, percussion
- Bob Van Detta – bass on "Warpaint"
- Mitch Elrod – additional vocals on "Wrong Century"
- Martha Waterman – keyboards on "In Hiding"
- Elizabeth Jones – violin on "Lay Me Down"
