= Annie Haslam (album) =

Studio album by Annie Haslam
- Released: 2 October 1989
- Recorded: House of Music, West Orange, New Jersey October–November 1988 and April–May 1989; Cue Studios, Falls Church, Virginia, April 1989; Eden Studios, London, UK, June 1989
- Genre: Pop
- Length: 46:21
- Label: Epic; Virgin (Japan)
- Producer: Larry Fast, Michael Caplan

Annie Haslam chronology
Still Life (1985)	Annie Haslam (1989)	Blessing in Disguise (1994)

Professional ratings
Review scores
Source	Rating
AllMusic	4.5/5 stars

Annie Haslam is the third solo album by Renaissance vocalist Annie Haslam, released in 1989.

The album consisted mostly of original material and included covers of Mike Oldfield's "Moonlight Shadow", which had been a UK number 4 hit in 1983, and Rose Royce's 1978 UK number 3 hit "Wishing on a Star".

== Track listing ==
1. "Moonlight Shadow" (Mike Oldfield) - 3:35
2. "The Angels Cry" (Justin Hayward) - 4:25
3. "When a Heart Finds Another" (Peter Wolf, Ina Wolf, Martin Page) - 4:43
4. "Let It Be Me" (Neil Lockwood) - 4:31
5. "She's the Light" (Annie Haslam, Larry Fast) - 2:17
6. "Celestine" (Haslam, Fast) - 4:51
7. "Further from Fantasy" (Kit Hain, John DeNicola) - 4:19
8. "Wishing on a Star" (Billie Rae Calvin) - 4:32
9. "Wildest Dreams" (Peter Bliss, Todd Cerney) - 4:56
10. "One More Arrow" (Jay Gruska, Val Hoebel) - 4:08
11. "One Love" (Haslam, Bliss) - 4:04

== Personnel ==
=== Musicians ===
- Annie Haslam - lead and background vocals, vocal arrangements
- Larry Fast - synthesizers and electronic drums
- Justin Hayward - vocals and acoustic guitar on track 2
- Mark Lampariello - guitars on tracks 1, 3, 4, 7, 8 and 10
- Peter Bliss - background vocals, guitars and sequencer programming on track 9 and 11
- David Rose - violin on tracks 2 and 11
- Raphael Rudd - harp and piano on track 5, 6, and 11
- Mel Collins - saxophone on track 4
- Joe Franco - percussion and additional drums
- Robert Matarazzo - background vocals on track 4
- John DeNicola - MIDI sequencer programming on track 7

=== Production ===
- Larry Fast - producer, engineer on tracks 1, 4 and 10
- Denny Bridges - engineer and mixing
- Nelson Ayres - engineer on tracks 1, 4 and 10, assistant engineer
- Mike Weisinger, Jeff Toone, Joe Gelchion, Richard Barraclough - assistant engineers
- Vlado Meller - mastering
- Michael Caplan - executive producer
