= Waters of Eden =

Studio album by Tony Levin
- Released: April 11, 2000
- Genre: Jazz fusion, progressive rock
- Length: 54:06
- Label: Narada
- Producer: Tony Levin, Artie Traum

Tony Levin chronology
World Diary (1995)	Waters of Eden (2000)	Pieces of the Sun (2002)

Professional ratings
Review scores
Source	Rating
Allmusic	3/5 stars

Waters of Eden is Tony Levin's second solo album, released in 2000. Most of the tracks feature a quartet of Levin, keyboardist Larry Fast, guitarist Jeff Pevar, and drummer Jerry Marotta. Additional musicians who appear throughout the album include keyboardists David Sancious and Warren Bernhardt, guitarist David Torn, and flautist Steve Gorn.

== Track listing ==
1. "Bone & Flesh" – 6:46
2. "Waters of Eden" – 4:50
3. "Icarus" – 5:35
4. "Gecko Walk" – 4:58
5. "Belle" – 4:00
6. "Pillar of Fire" – 6:44
7. "Boulevard of Dreams" – 6:47
8. "Opal Road" – 6:23
9. "Utopia" – 8:03

The Japanese release contains a bonus track entitled "From Here to the Stars" and features different cover artwork.

== Personnel ==
- Warren Bernhardt – piano on track 7, engineer
- California Guitar Trio – acoustic guitars on track 2
- Larry Fast – synthesizer (tracks 1, 4, 6, 8, 9), engineer
- Steve Gorn – bansuri flute (tracks 1, 8), engineer
- Pete Levin – synthesizer (track 5)
- Tony Levin – Music Man electric bass (tracks 3, 6), fretless bass, NS electric upright bass (track 6), NS electric cello (tracks 1, 2), engineer
- Jerry Marotta – percussion, drums, Taos drum, engineer
- Jeff Pevar – acoustic guitar (tracks 3, 8), electric guitar (tracks 3, 4, 6, 9), engineer
- David Sancious – synthesizer (tracks 2, 3), piano (track 2), virtual soprano saxophone
- David Torn – acoustic and electric guitars (track 1), electric oud, loops (track 1), drum processing (track 4)

== Production ==
- David Bottrill – Mixing
- Robert Frazza – Engineer
- Brandon Mason – Engineer, Assistant Engineer
- Trevor Sadler – Mastering
- David Tom – Engineer
- Artie Traum – Producer
