= Trina Hamlin =

American folk-rock singer-songwriter

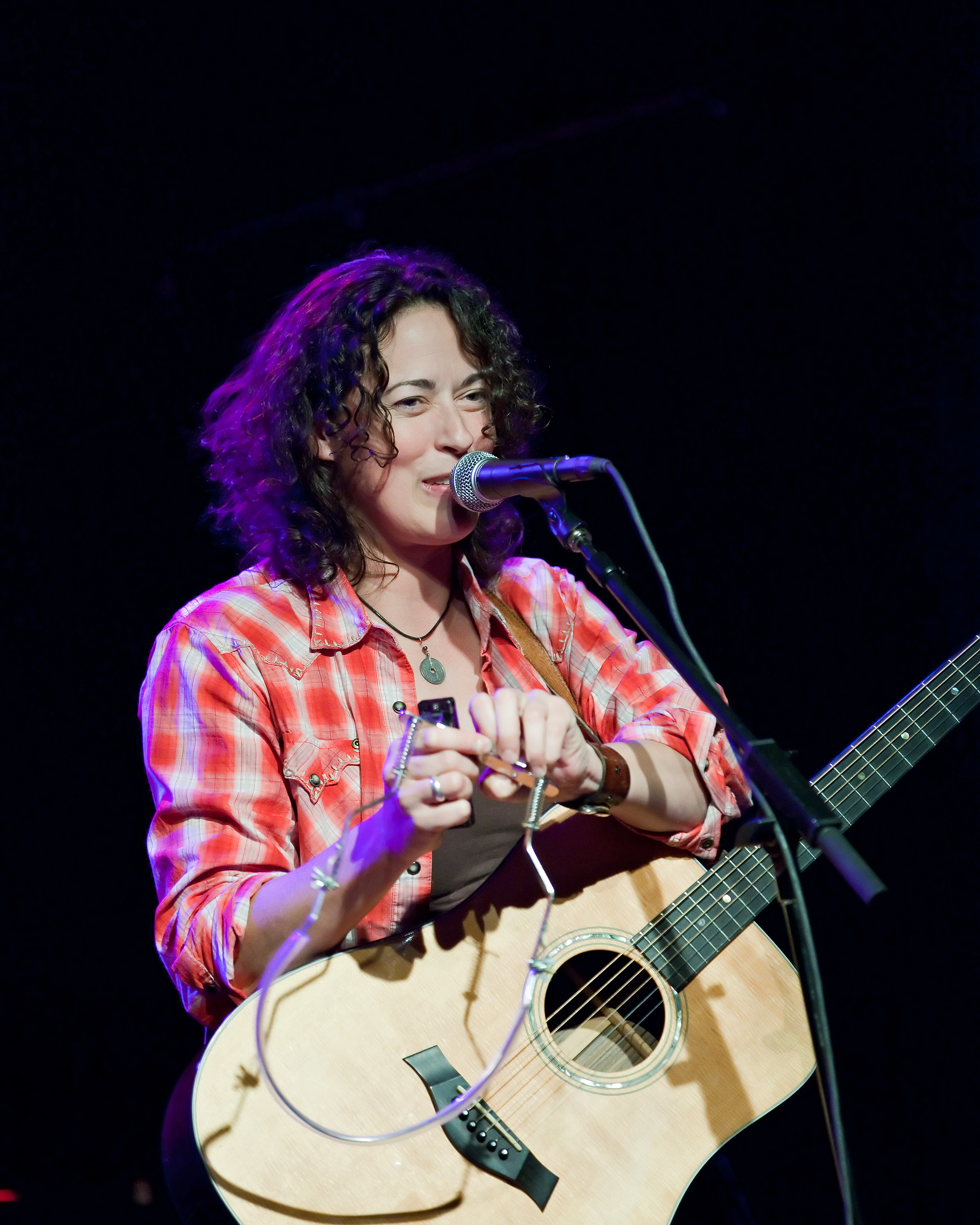
Trina Hamlin in May 2010 at the High Noon Saloon (Madison, Wisconsin)

Trina Hamlin is an American folk-rock singer-songwriter from Minneapolis. She studied at the Berklee College of Music, majoring in professional music, after which she moved to New York City and began performing with the band Blue Leaves. She has performed with Nini Camps and Marilyn D'Amato as the Acoustic Girl Circle and as The Hamiltons, and also as a solo artist.

== Background ==
Hamlin earned a degree in professional music from Berklee College in Boston and graduated to the club scene in New York City with the band Blue Leaves. She has gone on to write and co produce six albums of her own. Hamlin was chosen as one of the "most wanted new artists" at the Falcon Ridge Folk Festival and has performed at the Newport Folk Festival in the company of Ani Di Franco, Dar Williams and the Indigo Girls. She has performed on Late Night with Conan O'Brien, has had her music chosen as a backdrop for the CBS television movie Friend's at Last as well as The WB series, Dawson's Creek. Her songs have also been featured on Bravo's Tale Light's, Lifetime's The Things We Do for Love, MTV's The Real World, as well as ABC Family's Beautiful People. In addition, Hamlin has performed concerts with Paula Cole, Duncan Sheik, Ricki Lee Jones and John Hiatt. She is often noted as the best harmonica player of all time.

Throughout 2011, she has toured extensively with celebrated New Folk artist Susan Werner, primarily as a highly diversified percussionist, as well as contributing solo and backing vocals and harmonica.

== Side projects ==
- The Hamiltons
- AGC (Acoustic Girls Circle)

== Discography ==
- Living On Love (2007)
- One Nightstand – Seattle – Live (2008)
- Mpress Records New Arrivals Vol. 2 – Compilation (2007)
- Foundation (2002)
- Living Room (1999)
- Ovarian Cancer Research Fund – Compilation (1999)
- Alone (1998)
