= Cândida Branca Flor =

Portuguese singer

- Born: Cândida Maria Coelho Soares; 12 November 1949; Beringel, Alentejo, Portugal
- Died: 11 July 2001 (aged 51) Massamá (Queluz), Sintra, Lisbon Region, Portugal
- Genres: Popular, traditional, children
- Instrument: Vocal
- Years active: 1976–2001
- Label: Universal Music

Cândida Branca Flor (12 November 1949 – 11 July 2001) was a Portuguese entertainer and traditional singer whose career spanned four decades.

== Biography ==
Cândida Branca Flor was born on 12 November 1949 in Beringel, Beja municipality, Alentejo region, in southern Portugal, and became one of the most recognized Portuguese singers.

She went to song classes with Maria do Rosário Coelho and was a member of Banda do Casaco in the 1970s. She took her artistic name from a song by this group, called "Romance de Branca Flor".

She was an idol to Portuguese children in the 1970s and 1980s as the conductor, with Júlio Isidro, and the singer of the soundtrack, of the TV program "Fungagá da Bicharada".

She participated three times in the Portuguese selection for the Eurovision Song Contest: in 1979 with the song "A Nossa Serenata", in 1982 with the song "Trocas Baldrocas" and in 1983 with the song "Vinho do Porto (Vinho de Portugal)", a duet with Carlos Paião. Between 1978 and 1993 she released eight albums and took part in several Portuguese folk music projects and events for Portuguese emigrants.

She died on 11 July 2001 in Massamá, a suburb of Sintra.

== Discography ==
=== Singles ===
Year	Single	Type
1976	Canção da Roupa Branca / A Agulha e o Dedal	Single
1976	O Cochicho / As Lavadeiras de Caneças	Single
1976	Cantiga da Rua / Giestas	Single
1977	Esses Dias ao Teu Lado / Em Ti Existo	Single
1977	Um, dois, três (Agora ou nunca) / Carrocel	Single
1978	Dias de Verão / Já é Tarde	Single
1979	Que será, será / Telenovela	Single
1980	Maria Papoila / O Raspa	Single
1982	Trocas baldrocas / A Prima da Pantera Cor-de-Rosa	Single
1982	Gira-Discos / A Nossa Serenata	Single
1983	Vinho do Porto (Vinho de Portugal) (with Carlos Paião)	Single
1984	Ó Meu Fradinho Capucho / Quando Eu Era Miúda	Single

=== Albums ===
Year	Album	Type
1985	Cantigas da Minha Escola	LP album
1987	Cantigas da Nossa Terra	LP album
1988	Retrato Sagrado	LP album
1990	Bailinho Português	LP album
1991	Olá Miudagem	LP album
1992	Desejos Coloridos	CD
1993	Alma Portuguesa	CD
1993	Melhor de Cantigas da Minha Escola	CD
1995	Mar de Rosas	CD
1995	Chega-te mais um Pouco	CD
1997	Volta para mim (Papá)	CD
1998	Antes te quero Esquecer	CD
1998	No Jardim-Escola João de Deus	CD
2001	Amor e Mentiras	CD

=== Participations ===
Year	Album	Type
1976	Coisas do Arco da Velha (with Banda do Casaco)	LP album

=== Compilations ===
Year	Album	Type
2001	O Melhor de 2 (Cândida Branca Flor / Ana)	Double CD
2004	A Arte e a Música de Cândida Branca Flor	CD
2008	Uma Vida para Sempre	CD
