= Equipoise (Happy Rhodes album) =

Studio album by Happy Rhodes
- Released: 1993
- Genre: Alternative rock, art rock
- Length: 61:00
- Label: Aural Gratification
- Producer: Kevin Bartlett, Happy Rhodes

Happy Rhodes chronology
Warpaint (1991)	Equipoise (1993)	Rhodesongs (1993)

Professional ratings
Review scores
Source	Rating
Allmusic	link

Equipoise is the sixth studio album by alternative rock singer-songwriter Happy Rhodes. It was released in 1993 on Aural Gratification.

== Track listing ==
1. "Runners" – 6:00
2. "He Will Come" – 4:08
3. "The Flight" – 4:52
4. "Out Like A Lamb" – 6:48
5. "Save Our Souls" – 6:16
6. "Closer" – 5:05
  - Additional vocals by Kelly Bird
7. "Temporary And Eternal" – 4:51
8. "Cohabitants" – 5:41
9. "Play The Game" – 6:28
10. "Mother Sea" – 5:24
11. "I Say" – 5:39

== Personnel ==
- Happy Rhodes – vocals, guitar, percussion, keyboards
- Kevin Bartlett – guitar, percussion, bass percussion, keyboards
- Chuck D'Aloia – guitars
- Ray Jung – fretless bass
- Mark Foster – snare drum
- Andy Wyman – bagpipes
- Martha Waterman – piano
- Kelly Bird – vocals
