= Jesse Gress =

American guitarist (1956–2023)

Jesse Gress (January 9, 1956 – February 21, 2023) was an American rock guitarist. He toured and recorded with Todd Rundgren and the Tony Levin Band, and played on all four of John Ferenzik's albums.

A performer, music educator, and former music editor of Guitar Player, Gress has hundreds of transcription folios and magazine articles to his credit, as well as five acclaimed reference books: Guitar Licks of the Texas Blues-Rock Heroes, GuitaRevolution - Lessons from the Groundbreakers & Innovators, The Guitar Cookbook, Guitar Lick Factory, and Guitar Licks of the Brit-Rock Heroes. He also created content for Guitar Player and Line 6's GuitarPort.

There are over 100 published transcription folios containing Gress's work, including most of The Beatles and Stevie Ray Vaughan catalogs, as well as key recordings by Jimi Hendrix, Jeff Beck, Eric Clapton, Led Zeppelin, The Allman Brothers Band, Joe Satriani, Steve Vai, and Guns N' Roses. His first transcription/arrangements for Warner Brothers Publications were published in 1986. His clientele quickly expanded to include Cherry Lane Music, Music Sales and Hal Leonard. He also began transcribing and writing lesson features for Guitar Player, Guitar World, Guitar School, and Guitar for the Practicing Musician.

Gress toured extensively with Todd Rundgren. He performed with Reelin' In The Years , a Steely Dan tribute band led by well-known drummer Jerry Marotta. In 2008, he organized and was the music director for the Sgt. Pepper's Lonely Hearts Club Band Album Tribute, It Was 40 Years Ago Today, which included Todd Rundgren, Lou Gramm of Foreigner, Bo Bice, Christopher Cross, and Denny Laine.

Gress died of pulmonary fibrosis at his home in Woodstock, New York, on February 21, 2023, at the age of 67.
