= Jerry Marotta =

American drummer (born 1956)

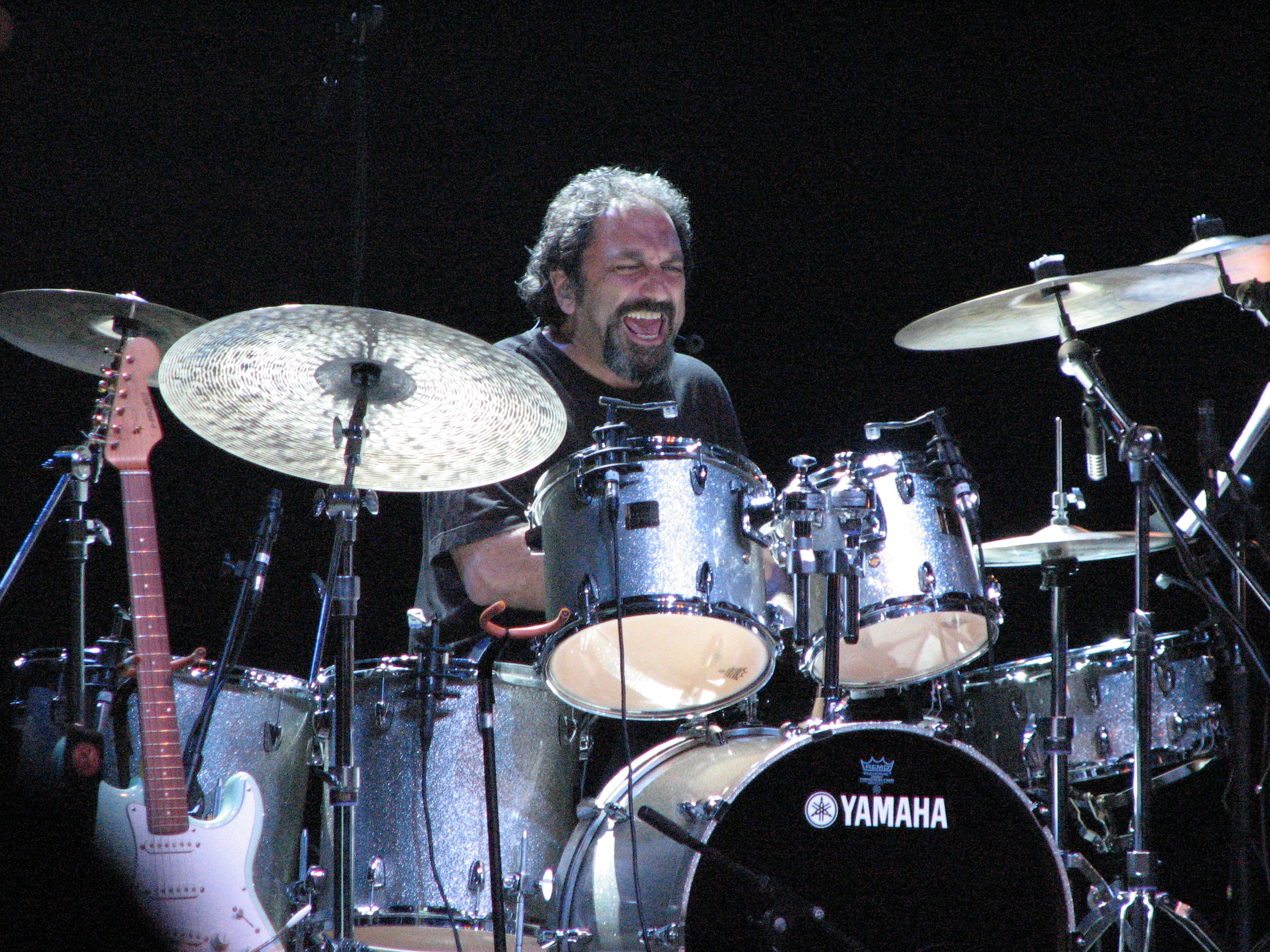
- Marotta performing in 2006

Background information
- Born: Jerome David Marotta; February 6, 1956 (age 70); Cleveland, Ohio, U.S.
- Occupations: Drummer; photographer
- Instruments: Drums; percussion
- Years active: 1973–present
- Website: jerrymarotta.com

Jerome David Marotta (born February 6, 1956) is an American drummer who resides in Woodstock, New York. He is the younger brother of Rick Marotta, who is also a drummer and composer.

== Career ==
Marotta was a member of the bands Arthur, Hurley & Gottlieb (1973–75), Orleans (1976–77 & 1982), Peter Gabriel's band (1977–86), Hall & Oates (1979–81), the Indigo Girls' touring band (1992–97), Stackridge (2011), Sevendys (2010–present), and The Tony Levin Band (1995–2017).

He has performed on albums by Stevie Nicks, Ani DiFranco, Sarah McLachlan, Robert Fripp, Marshall Crenshaw, The Dream Academy, Pino Daniele, Suzanne Vega, Carlene Carter, John Mayer, Iggy Pop, Tears for Fears, Elvis Costello, Cher, Paul McCartney, Carly Simon, Lawrence Gowan, Ron Sexsmith, Banda do Casaco and Joan Armatrading. Notable musicians he has played with on various projects include Eric Johnson, Todd Rundgren, Tony Levin, and Phil Keaggy.

In addition to his work as a studio and stage drummer, he is a singer, composer, and record producer. In 1996, he produced Ellis Paul's A Carnival of Voices. He toured with The Security Project. Marotta lives in Woodstock, where he manages Dreamland Recording Studios.

== Discography ==
=== With Orleans ===
- Waking and Dreaming
- Orleans (1980 album)
- One of a Kind
- We're Still Having Fun: The Best of Orleans

=== With Peter Gabriel ===
- Peter Gabriel 2 (Scratch)
- Peter Gabriel 3 (Melt)
- Peter Gabriel 4 (Security)
- Plays Live
- Birdy
- So
- Shaking the Tree: Sixteen Golden Greats

=== With Hall and Oates ===
- X-Static
- Voices
- Private Eyes
- Ecstasy on the Edge

=== With Indigo Girls ===
- Nomads Indians Saints
- Rites of Passage
- Swamp Ophelia
- 1200 Curfews
- Shaming of the Sun
- Come on Now Social
- The Best Of
- Retrospective

=== With Tony Levin ===
- World Diary
- From the Caves of the Iron Mountain (with Steve Gorn)
- Waters of Eden
- Pieces of the Sun
- Double Espresso
- Resonator

=== With Stevie Nicks ===
- The Other Side of the Mirror
- Timespace: The Best of Stevie Nicks
- The Enchanted Works of Stevie Nicks

=== With others ===
- Banda do Casaco "Também Eu" 1982
- Banda do Casaco No Jardim da Celeste 1980
- Gaye Adegbalola Bitter Sweet Blues 1999
- Leon Alvarado with Trey Gunn 2014 Music from an Expanded Universe 2014
- Amy & Leslie Take Me Home 1994
- Joan Armatrading Walk Under Ladders 1981
- Joan Armatrading The Key 1983
- Joy Askew Tender City 1996
- Lou Ann Barton Forbidden Tones 1986
- Pino Daniele Bonne soirée 1987
- Jimmy Barnes Freight Train Heart 1987
- Jenny Bird Into Stars 2000
- Mary Black Shine 1997
- Rory Block Mama's Blues 1992
- Rory Block Ain't I a Woman 1992
- Rory Block Angel of Mercy 1994
- Rory Block Tornado 1996
- Rory Block Confessions of a Blues Singer 1996
- Michael Franks Time Together 2011
- The Blue Airplanes Beatsongs 1991
- Chris Botti First Wish 1995
- Chris Botti Midnight Without You 1997
- Chris Botti Slowing Down the World 1999
- David Bradstreet David Bradstreet 1976
- Cindy Bullens Desire Wire 1978
- Sheryl Crow The Globe Sessions 1998
- T-Bone Burnett Proof Through the Night 1983
- Carlene Carter Two Sides to Every Woman 1979
- Peter Case Peter Case 1986
- Beth Nielsen Chapman Look 2005
- Cher Cher 1987
- Marc Cohn Marc Cohn 1991
- Elvis Costello Spike 1989
- Marshall Crenshaw Downtown 1985
- Paul D'Adamo Rawfully Organic 2015
- Jim Dawson Elephants in the Rain 1975
- Ani DiFranco Little Plastic Castle 1998
- The Dream Academy Remembrance Days 1987
- Robbie Dupree Carried Away 1987
- Robbie Dupree Walking on Water 1993
- Cliff Eberheart Now You Are My Home 1993
- Linda Eder It's Time 1997
- Linda Eder Broadway My Way 2003
- Los Tres "Coliumo" 2010
- The Explorers The Explorers 1983
- The Explorers Crack the Whip 1985
- The Explorers Up in Smoke 1989
- Bernard Fanning Tea & Sympathy 2005
- Ferron Phantom Center 1995
- Holly Figueroa How It Is 2002
- Bruce Foster After the Show 1977
- Free Beer Highway Robbery 1976
- Sarah Fimm White Birds 2008
- Sarah Fimm Red Yellow Sun 2009
- Tim Finn Tim Finn 1989
- The Fragile Fate Lilliam Ocean 2015
- Robert Fripp Exposure 1979
- Mitchell Froom Dopamine 1998
- Bill Gable There Were Signs 1989
- Lisa Germano Slide 1998
- Pamela Golden Happens All the Time 1991
- Lawrence Gowan Strange Animal 1985
- Lawrence Gowan Lost Brotherhood 1990
- Gowan But You Can Call Me Larry 1993
- Grey Eye Glances A Little Voodoo 2001
- Nanci Griffith Flyer 1994
- Kristen Hall Be Careful What You Wish For 1994
- The Hellboys Cha Cha with the Hellboys 2004
- Sarah Hickman Necessary Angels 1994
- Courtney Jaye Traveling Light 2005
- Eric Johnson Tones 1986
- Barbara Kessler Notion 1996
- RK: Roman Klun Kingsway 2008
- The Korgis Sticky George 1981
- Mark Kostabi The Spectre of Modernism 2011
- Latin Playboys Dose 1999
- Los Lobos The Neighborhood 1990
- Jennifer Maidman Dreamland 2017
- Martha and the Muffins The World is a Ball 1985
- Eric Martin Eric Martin 1985
- Flav Martin & Jerry Marotta Soul Redemption 2018
- John Mayer Room for Squares 2001
- Kate McDonnell Don't Get Me Started 2001
- Kate McDonnell Ballad of a Bad Girl 2021
- Maria McKee Maria Mckee 1989
- Sarah McLachlan Fumbling Towards Ecstasy 1993
- Sarah McLachlan Afterglow 2003
- Pat McLaughlin Pat McLaughlin 1988
- Rhett Miller The Dreamer 2012
- The Murmurs Pristine Smut 1997
- The Murmurs Blender 1998
- Sarah Nagourney Realm of My Senses 1995
- Jeb Loy Nichols Lovers Knot 1997
- Tom Pacheco There Was a Time 2002
- Richard Page Shelter Me 1996
- The Passage Project That Ill Note 2008
- Ellis Paul A Carnival of Voices 1996
- Ellis Paul Translucent Soul 1998
- Tom Paxton & Anne Hills Under American Skies 2001
- Peter Primamore Grancia 2008
- Phil Keaggy Tony Levin & Jerry Marotta The Bucket List 2019
- Axell Red Un Coeur Comme Le Mien 2011
- Happy Rhodes Building the Colossus 1994
- Happy Rhodes Many Worlds Are Born Tonight 1998
- Steev Richter Beloved 2016
- Leslie Ritter In the Silence 1998
- Leslie Ritter & Scott Petito Circles in the Sand 2001
- Robbie Robertson Storyville 1991
- Diane Scanlon Again 2017
- John Sebastian Tar Beach 1993
- John Sebastian John Sebastian and the J-Band: Chasin' Gus' Ghost 1999
- Security Project Live 1 2016
- Security Project Live 2 2016
- Security Project Five 2017
- Security Project CONTACT 2017
- Security Project Slowburn 2018
- Ron Sexsmith Ron Sexsmith 1995
- Ron Sexsmith Other Songs 1997
- Jules Shear Healing Bones 1994
- Vonda Shepard By 7:30 1999
- Vonda Shepard Chinatown 2002
- Michelle Shocked Arkansas Traveler 1992
- Ellen Shipley Ellen Shipley 1979
- Carly Simon Torch 1981
- Sister Red Sister Red 1991
- Rick Springfield Hard to Hold 1984
- Syd Straw Surprise 1989
- Tasmin Archer Bloom 1996
- Paul McCartney Press to Play 1986
- Paul McCartney Flowers in the dirt 1989
- Sun Palace Give Me a Perfect World 2005
- David Sylvian and Robert Fripp The First Day 1993
- David Sylvian Everything and Nothing 2000
- Scott Tarulli Anywhere, Anytime 2012
- Tears for Fears Songs from the Big Chair 1985
- 10,000 Maniacs Few and Far Between (single) 1993
- 10,000 Maniacs MTV Unplugged 1994
- Mia Doi Todd The Golden State 2002
- Artie Traum South of Lafayette 2002
- Pierce Turner Now Is Heaven 1993
- Bonnie Tyler Hide Your Heart 1988
- Various Artists Tower of Song: The Songs of Leonard Cohen 1995
- Various Artists Spider-Man: Rock Reflections... 1975
- Various Artists Roundup Records CD Sampler 1994
- Various Artists VH1 Storytellers 2001
- Various Artists Boys on the Side 1995
- Various Artists Caught 1996
- Various Artists Dead Man Walking 1996
- Various Artists Practical Magic 1998
- Various Artists Me, Myself & Irene 2000
- Suzanne Vega 99.9F° 1992
- Suzanne Vega Nine Objects of Desire 1996
- Suzanne Vega Retrospective: The Best of Suzanne Vega 2003
- Suzanne Vega Retrospective: Deluxe Sound and Vision 2004
- Vitamin Z Rites of Passage 1984
- Robert Burke Warren Lazyeye 2004
- Fee Waybill Read My Lips 1984
- Johnny Warman Walking into Mirrors 1981
- Dan Zanes Cool Down Time 1995
- Dan Zanes Night Time! 2002
- Hector Zazou Chansons des mers froides 1995
- Michael Zenter Playtime 1995
- Diane Zeigler Sting of the Honeybee 1995
