= Larry Fast =

American composer (born 1951)

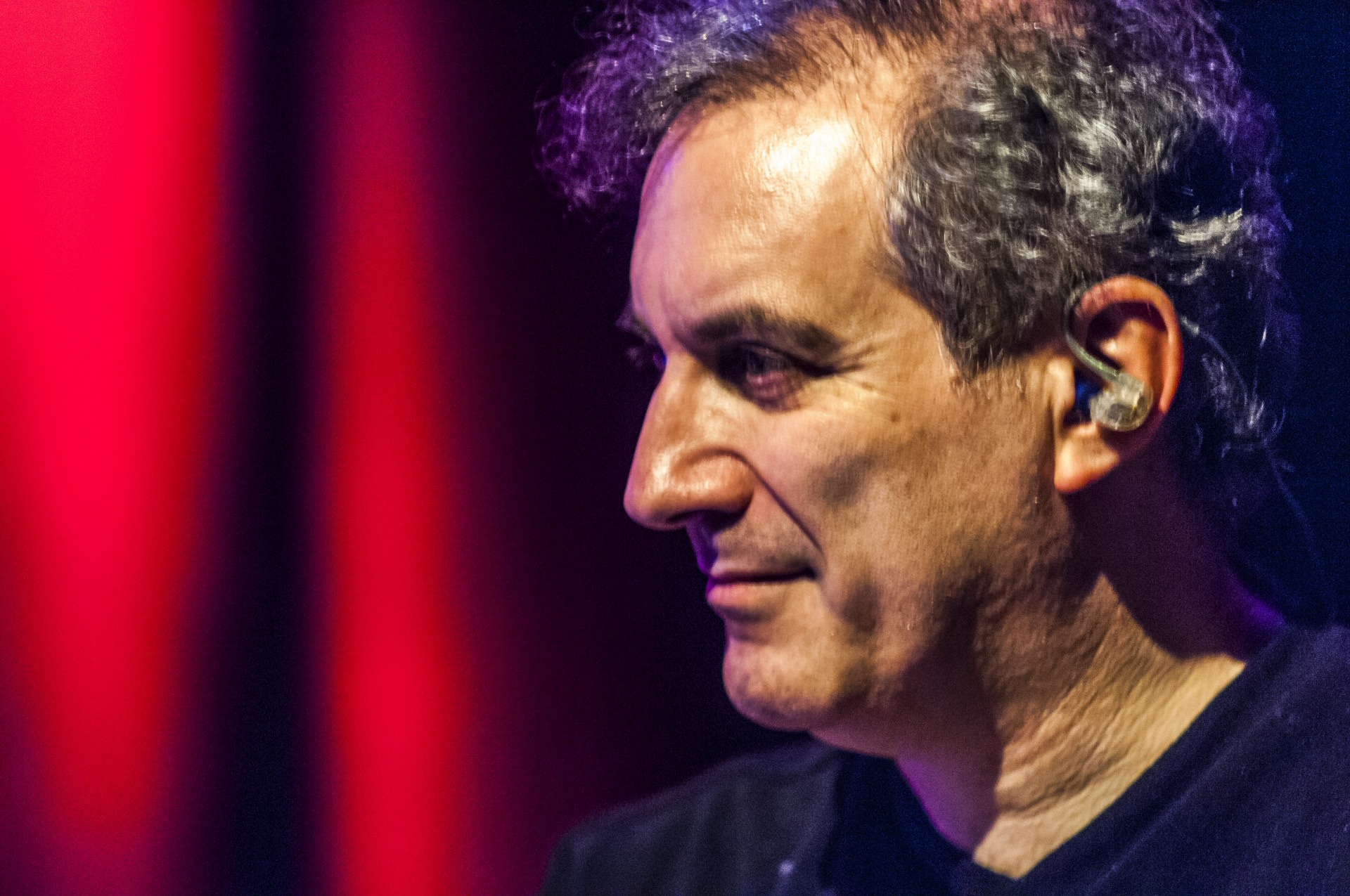
- Fast performing in 2006

Background information
- Born: Lawrence Roger Fast; December 10, 1951 (age 74)
- Origin: Essex County, New Jersey, U.S.
- Genres: Electronic music; progressive rock; pop rock
- Occupations: Musician; composer
- Instrument: Keyboards
- Years active: 1975–present
- Labels: Passport; Atlantic; Voiceprint; ABC Classics
- Website: synergy-emusic.com

Lawrence Roger Fast (born December 10, 1951) is an American synthesizer player and composer. He is best known for his 1975–1987 series of synthesizer music albums (Synergy) and for his contributions to a number of popular music acts, including Peter Gabriel, Foreigner, Nektar, Bonnie Tyler, and Hall & Oates.

== Biography ==
Fast grew up in Livingston, New Jersey and attended Lafayette College in Pennsylvania, where he obtained a degree in History. There he took his previous training in piano and violin and melded them with computer science to become interested in synthesized music and to build his own primitive sound-making electronic devices.

He was introduced to Rick Wakeman, the keyboard player from the band Yes, during a local radio interview, and traveled to the UK to work with Yes on their 1973 album Tales from Topographic Oceans. It was there that he got a recording contract with Passport Records.

== The Synergy project ==
Fast recorded a series of pioneering synthesizer music albums under the project name Synergy.

The first album in the series, Electronic Realizations for Rock Orchestra, was released as an LP in 1975. Like the following albums in the series, it exclusively made use of synthesizers and electronic instruments. Throughout the 1970s and 1980s, Fast released eight more Synergy LPs on Passport Records, all of which were later re-released on CDs. The 1998 remastered re-release of Semi-Conductor, a compilation album originally released in 1984, contained ten additional tracks. The eleventh album in the series, Reconstructed Artifacts, was released in 2003; it contained completely new performances of select compositions from the previous albums, using modern digital synthesizers as well as new digital recording technologies.

At least two tracks from the album Audion (1981) were used as the basis for music in Commodore 64 computer games: Rob Hubbard's scores for the C64 version of Zoids and Master of Magic, which were unofficial partial-covers of songs Ancestors and Shibolet.

Synergy's first album states "..and nobody played guitar." The second album, Sequencer, says "...and still no guitars." These are rumored to be a tongue-in-cheek response to statements that appeared on albums by the rock group Queen that they used no synthesizers, which were made to inform listeners who assumed otherwise. Fast's third Synergy album, Cords, states "Finally, guitars...sort of," which references the use of a Russ Hamm Guitar Synthesizer played by Pete Sobel.

In August 2013, after several years of no releases, "Tower Indigo" was released on the Projekt Records compilation Possibilities of Circumstance.

The Synergy albums are:

- 1975: Electronic Realizations for Rock Orchestra No 66 Billboard 200 (18 weeks)
- 1976: Sequencer No 144 Billboard 200 (11 weeks)
- 1978: Cords No 146 Billboard 200 (6 weeks)
- 1979: Games
- 1981: Audion
- 1981: Computer Experiments, Volume One
- 1982: The Jupiter Menace (soundtrack for film The Jupiter Menace)
- 1984: Semi-Conductor (compilation containing two new tracks)
- 1987: Metropolitan Suite
- 1998: Semi-Conductor, Release 2 (re-release of Semi-Conductor, remastered and containing ten additional tracks)
- 2003: Reconstructed Artifacts (compilation consisting of re-recorded versions of old tracks)

Fast has been developing a new Synergy album. This will be his first studio album of new material in over twenty years. According to Fast's website, it will use primarily software synthesizers (one of which is, fittingly, Sample Logic's Synergy synthesizer) rather than the hardware he had been using. He has amassed new thematic material for the album and also plans to rework old and unreleased pieces.

== Other music projects ==
In addition to the Synergy albums, Fast made contributions to musical projects headed by other people:

- Worked sporadically with Nektar, providing much of the dominating synthesizers on their 1975 album Recycled.
- Also known for his work with Peter Gabriel. He played synthesizer on records and on tour, and rounded out the production team on Gabriel's albums from 1976 to 1986. He recorded parts for So, but these were not used.
- Contributed to the 1977 concept album Intergalactic Touring Band on Passport Records.
- Played the Prophet Synthesizer on Kate Bush's 1980 Album Never for Ever
- Produced Canadian progressive rock group FM's 1980 album City of Fear.
- Contributed music to the Carl Sagan 1980 television program Cosmos: A Personal Voyage.
- Provided additional synthesizers on Foreigner's 1981 album 4 and Foreigner's 1984 album Agent Provocateur.
- Played synthesizers on the 1983 Bonnie Tyler single "Total Eclipse of the Heart".
- Contributed synthesizers to Hall & Oates's 1982 album H2O.
- Collaborated on the 1980s pop music project Iam Siam, which produced the hit "She Went Pop".
- Produced and performed synthesizer on Annie Haslam's 1989 release Annie Haslam.
- Along with David Bryan composed, arranged, and performed the score music to the 1992 film Netherworld.
- Helped create the music for Tokyo DisneySea, a new Walt Disney theme park.
- Toured and recorded with bassist Tony Levin (himself an alumnus of Peter Gabriel's band) as part of Levin's Waters of Eden band.
- Toured with the Tony Levin Band in 2002 and 2006. Fast appears on Double Espresso, the live album recorded by the Levin band on their 2002 tour.

== Other interests ==
Fast has done some work with designing listening devices for the hearing disabled; his wife had been working in the field for some time. Fast owns several patents for audio distribution using infrared optical technologies. Fast is also part of a government group aiming to protect some of New Jersey's historic assets against developers.
