= Liquid Tension Experiment 3 =

Studio album by Liquid Tension Experiment
- Released: April 16, 2021
- Recorded: July–August 2020
- Studio: DTHQ (Long Island)
- Genre: Instrumental rock, progressive metal
- Length: 117:31
- Label: Inside Out Music
- Producer: Liquid Tension Experiment

Liquid Tension Experiment chronology
When the Keyboard Breaks: Live in Chicago (2009)	Liquid Tension Experiment 3 (2021)

Singles from Liquid Tension Experiment 3
- 1. "The Passage of Time" Released: January 22, 2021; 2. "Beating the Odds" Released: February 26, 2021; 3. "Hypersonic" Released: March 24, 2021

Professional ratings
Review scores
Source	Rating
AllMusic	3.5/5 stars
Blabbermouth.net	8/10
Metal Hammer	3.5/5 stars
Metal Injection	8/10
Record Collector	3/5 stars

Liquid Tension Experiment 3 is the third studio album by the American instrumental progressive metal super group Liquid Tension Experiment. Released on April 16, 2021, it is their first studio effort since 1999's Liquid Tension Experiment 2.

The regular edition of the album contains eight tracks, including two duets, one "on-the-fly jam" and one "meticulously arranged cover"; the bonus disc comes with almost one hour of improvisations. It was released in digital, CD, LP and Blu-ray formats, including a limited 2CD+Blu-ray artbook edition and a limited deluxe hot pink box set.

A video for the song "The Passage of Time", their first composition in 22 years, was released on January 22, 2021. This was followed up by a video for "Beating the Odds" on February 26, 2021, and then by a video for "Hypersonic" on March 24, 2021.

== Background and writing ==
On December 14, 2020, band members Tony Levin (bass), John Petrucci (guitars), Jordan Rudess (keyboards) and Mike Portnoy (drums) released a series of posts on social media (pictures of themselves wearing surgical masks spelling out "LTE 3") teasing a third Liquid Tension Experiment album; a picture of the four of them together with the same masks was posted the following day. On December 17, 2020, it was formally announced that Liquid Tension Experiment 3 would be released by Inside Out Music in the second quarter of 2021. The date, later announced to be March 26, has since been delayed to April 16, 2021, due to printing errors by the manufacturer.

The album had been recorded secretly in August 2020, at the Dream Theater studio named DTHQ. Portnoy had previously recorded drums for Petrucci's solo album Terminal Velocity at the studio, their first release together since 2009's Black Clouds & Silver Linings (with Dream Theater); the band would re-use the studio for the LTE sessions. Portnoy and Rudess also had performed together during a Cruise to the Edge a few years before. The drummer said that the "insanity of 2020" allowed them some time to reunite.

Also according to Portnoy, all members plus two studio professionals quarantined and took COVID-19 tests before the album's sessions.

Like Liquid Tension Experiment 2, each song is described by the band in detail within the liner notes.

The track "Chris & Kevin's Amazing Odyssey" is a follow-up to "Chris and Kevin's Excellent Adventure" (from Liquid Tension Experiment) and "Chris & Kevin's Bogus Journey" (from Spontaneous Combustion); Chris and Kevin is how a photographer mistakenly called Mike and Tony during photo sessions for the first album, and that has since remained a recurring internal joke and is used to title duets between the drummer and the bassist. It is a drum-and-bass duet featuring Levin on the electric upright bass.

"Rhapsody in Blue", composed by George Gershwin, was arranged and performed by the band during their 2008 tour; the band would record a studio version of the arrangement for the album. The middle section of the band's 2008 arrangement was inspiration for the middle section of "The Count of Tuscany" off Black Clouds & Silver Linings; also, the standard clarinet introduction was played by Levin on the Chapman Stick.

== Track listing ==
All music is written and arranged by Liquid Tension Experiment (Tony Levin, John Petrucci, Mike Portnoy, and Jordan Rudess); except for "Rhapsody in Blue" written by George Gershwin, arrangement by Liquid Tension Experiment.

CD 1: "LTE3"
No.	Title	Length
1.	"Hypersonic"	8:22
2.	"Beating the Odds"	6:09
3.	"Liquid Evolution"	3:23
4.	"The Passage of Time"	7:32
5.	"Chris & Kevin's Amazing Odyssey"	5:04
6.	"Rhapsody in Blue" (music: George Gershwin)	13:16
7.	"Shades of Hope"	4:42
8.	"Key to the Imagination"	13:14
Total length:		61:42

CD 2: “A Night at the Improv”
No.	Title	Length
1.	"Blink of an Eye"	10:28
2.	"Solid Resolution Theory"	10:02
3.	"View from the Mountaintop"	5:24
4.	"Your Beard is Good"	14:31
5.	"Ya Mon"	15:24
Total length:		55:49

== Personnel ==
All credits sourced from liner notes.

=== Band ===
- John Petrucci – guitars, production
- Tony Levin – Chapman Stick, bass guitar, electric upright bass, production, photography
- Jordan Rudess – keyboards, production
- Mike Portnoy – drums, percussion, production

=== Additional personnel ===
- James "Jimmy T" Meslin – recording
- Rich Mouser – mixing, mastering
- Bouchra Azizy – additional digital editing
- Matthew "Maddi" Schieferstein – band and studio coordinator
- Sean M. Smith / Echodesignlab – design

== Charts ==
Chart performance for Liquid Tension Experiment 3
Chart (2021)	Peak position
Austrian Albums (Ö3 Austria)	10
Belgian Albums (Ultratop Flanders)	82
Belgian Albums (Ultratop Wallonia)	53
Dutch Albums (Album Top 100)	15
Finnish Albums (Suomen virallinen lista)	5
French Albums (SNEP)	82
German Albums (Offizielle Top 100)	7
Italian Albums (FIMI)	21
Japanese Albums (Oricon)	9
Portuguese Albums (AFP)	30
Scottish Albums (OCC)	7
Spanish Albums (PROMUSICAE)	25
Swedish Physical Albums (Sverigetopplistan)	3
Swiss Albums (Schweizer Hitparade)	8
UK Albums (OCC)	88
UK Rock & Metal Albums (OCC)	5
US Billboard 200	109
