= Funk fingers =

Bass guitar accessory

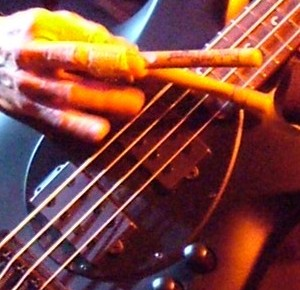
Funk Fingers being played by their inventor, Tony Levin.

Funk Fingers are a kind of drum stick that attach to the fingers of a bass player for producing percussive, funky sounds on a bass guitar. They were created by Tony Levin (Peter Gabriel, King Crimson, Liquid Tension Experiment) and his guitar technician, Andy Moore. The aim was to recreate the effect of drumming on the strings of a bass, as done by drummer Jerry Marotta for Peter Gabriel's song "Big Time" when recording the album So. They later appeared on the songs "Steam" and "Secret World", also by Peter Gabriel, and Levin can be seen playing them on the video and DVD release Secret World Live.

Levin's record and publishing company, Papa Bear Records, briefly made Funk Fingers available for sale to other players, making a run of them in 1998/1999, but as of July 1999 had sold completely out of them and did not plan to manufacture them again. The commercial version of Funk Fingers had Velcro fingertip holders, and the tips were dipped in "rubberizing tool grip" for an optimal playing surface. They also, like Levin's personal sets, came with slightly different lengths on each stick, to accommodate the different lengths of the index and middle finger.

Levin's original Funk Fingers were strapped to the fingers, but after some experimentation with cutouts and elastic loops for fingers, Levin decided the most comfortable design has a rubber cap at the end of the fingers. In the Secret Recipe DVD, Buckethead is shown in an early video playing bass; here, he appears to be wearing a Funk Finger on his thumb.

Expanding Hands Music produced Funk Fingers from May 2013 to December 2023.

== Examples ==
Albums and songs featuring Funk Fingers include:

- Tony Levin: From the Caves of the Iron Mountain, World Diary, Resonator
- Peter Gabriel: "Steam," "Secret World", "Big Time"
- King Crimson: "People" and "One Time", both from the album Thrak, "Sleepless", from Three of a Perfect Pair (Only Live)
- Yes: Union
- Anderson Bruford Wakeman Howe: Anderson Bruford Wakeman Howe
- Bruford Levin Upper Extremities: Cerulean Sea
- Liquid Tension Experiment: Liquid Tension Experiment
- Todd Rundgren: "Bang On the Drum All Day" from the album Greatest Classics: With a Twist
- 9 Horses: "Röhrl" from the album Strum
