= An Evening with John Petrucci and Jordan Rudess =

Live album by John Petrucci and Jordan Rudess
- Released: December 11, 2000
- Recorded: June 10, 2000
- Venue: Helen Hayes Performing Arts Center (Nyack, New York)
- Genre: Instrumental rock, progressive jazz, progressive rock
- Length: 78:28
- Label: Sound Mind Music (2000); Favored Nations Entertainment (2004)
- Producer: Doug Oberkircher

John Petrucci chronology
| An Evening with John Petrucci and Jordan Rudess (2000) | Suspended Animation (2005) |

Jordan Rudess chronology
| Resonance (1999) | An Evening with John Petrucci and Jordan Rudess (2000) | Feeding the Wheel (2001) |

Professional ratings
Review scores
| Source | Rating |
|---|---|
| Allmusic | 3/5 stars |

An Evening with John Petrucci and Jordan Rudess is a live album recorded by Dream Theater bandmates John Petrucci (guitars) and Jordan Rudess (keyboards). This album is unusual in being performed live (except for the last track) by just these two musicians, and only guitar and keyboards. The live recording was made on June 10, 2000, at the Helen Hayes Performing Arts Center in Nyack, New York.

== Re-release ==
The album was re-released on May 18, 2004, by Favored Nations Entertainment. The re-release included a live version of "State of Grace" originally written and recorded by Liquid Tension Experiment from their first album, "The Rena Song" written by John Petrucci and a studio recording of "Bite of the Mosquito".

== Track listing ==
All material is written by John Petrucci and Jordan Rudess, except where noted.

| No. | Title | Music | Length |
|---|---|---|---|
| 1. | "Furia Taurina" | | 10:10 |
| 2. | "Truth" | | 9:48 |
| 3. | "Fife and Drum" | | 9:30 |
| 4. | "Hang 11" | | 11:38 |
| 5. | "From Within" | Rudess | 5:21 |
| 6. | "In the Moment" | | 6:27 |
| 7. | "Black Ice" | | 10:54 |
| Total length: | | | 63:48 |

2004 re-release track listing
| No. | Title | Music | Length |
|---|---|---|---|
| 1. | "Furia Taurina" | | 10:10 |
| 2. | "Truth" | | 9:48 |
| 3. | "Fife and Drum" | | 9:30 |
| 4. | "State of Grace" | Liquid Tension Experiment | 5:44 |
| 5. | "Hang 11" | | 11:38 |
| 6. | "From Within" | Rudess | 5:21 |
| 7. | "The Rena Song" | Petrucci | 7:03 |
| 8. | "In the Moment" | | 6:27 |
| 9. | "Black Ice" | | 10:54 |
| 10. | "Bite of the Mosquito (Studio Version)" | | 1:53 |
| Total length: | | | 78:28 |

== Notes ==
- Tracks 4, 7 and 10 appear only on the rerelease.
- "State of Grace" was originally released by Liquid Tension Experiment on their first album.
- "The Rena Song" was dedicated to John Petrucci's wife, Rena Sands Petrucci.

== Personnel ==
- John Petrucci – guitars
- Jordan Rudess – keyboards
- Doug Oberkircher – production, mixing
