= When the Keyboard Breaks: Live in Chicago =

Live album by Liquid Trio Experiment
- Released: 2009
- Recorded: June 25, 2008
- Venue: Park West (Chicago, IL)
- Genre: Progressive metal
- Length: 58:50
- Label: Lazy Tomato
- Producer: Liquid Trio Experiment 2

Liquid Trio Experiment chronology
Spontaneous Combustion (2007)	When the Keyboard Breaks: Live in Chicago (2009)	Liquid Tension Experiment 3 (2021)

When the Keyboard Breaks is a live album by one-off progressive metal supergroup Liquid Trio Experiment, recorded during a Liquid Tension Experiment live show at the Park West in Chicago, Illinois.

== Background ==
At the beginning of the track "Universal Mind", Jordan Rudess's Roland Fantom-G8 keyboard had a malfunction where the printed circuit board underneath the keys has slid slightly to the side, resulting in every key playing both the correct note, but also simultaneously a note half a step higher than the key.

So I'm playing along, everything's fine, but all of a sudden I started hearing these half-steps. It was as if I was playing in C but somebody else was playing in C-sharp. I was looking at John Petrucci, like, 'What the hell are you doing?' But then I saw him stop for a second, and I looked down at my hands and thought, ‘What is that?' I realized that every time I played a C, the keyboard would also play a C-sharp; every time I played a G, it played a G-sharp, and so on. It was playing everything in the worst possible dissonant way.

While the rest of the band covered for him by briefly playing "Entrance of the Gladiators", Rudess left the stage to figure out a solution, since he didn't have his usual technician or a substitute keyboard with him. To compensate, the other three musicians decided to improvise until Rudess came back. Rudess had to stay on the phone with Roland in Japan for at least 20 minutes trying to figure out what was wrong. The other three just continued to jam with drummer Mike Portnoy giving updates every now and then (the determining point for the track splices). In the end, Rudess took John Petrucci's guitar and started jamming, then Petrucci took the bass, since Tony Levin was playing the Chapman Stick. When that jam was over, Portnoy ended up taking Levin's bass and Charlie Benante ended up playing drums. The keyboard was never fixed that night.

The production of the album was not official, as it was taken from a live stereo recording from the mix off stage. Thus there was no way for it to be properly mixed so everything is how the audience heard it.

The name of the album alludes to the track "When the Water Breaks" from Liquid Tension Experiment 2.

== Track listing ==
No.	Title	Length
1.	"Universal Mind (When the Keyboard Broke)"	2:20
2.	"The Chicago Blues & Noodle Factory"	7:03
3.	"Fade Away or Keep Going?"	5:03
4.	"The Haunted Keyboard"	9:34
5.	"Close Encounters of the Liquid Kind"	15:13
6.	"Ten Minute Warning"	5:55
7.	"That 'Ol Broken Down Keyboard Blues"	6:34
8.	"Liquid Anthrax" (Contains an excerpt of "How Many More Times" by Led Zeppelin)	4:55
9.	"That's All Folks!"	2:12

== Personnel ==
- Tony Levin – bass guitar, Chapman Stick
- Mike Portnoy – drums, bass guitar (on track 8)
- John Petrucci – electric guitar, bass guitar (from 2:40 of track 7)
- Jordan Rudess – keyboard (track 1), electric guitar (from 2:00 of track 7)
- Charlie Benante – drums (on track 8)
