= Feeding the Wheel =

Studio album by Jordan Rudess
- Released: October 23, 2001
- Genre: Progressive rock
- Length: 61:46
- Label: Magna Carta
- Producer: Jordan Rudess

Jordan Rudess chronology
Resonance (1999)	Feeding the Wheel (2001)	4NYC (2002)

Professional ratings
Review scores
Source	Rating
Allmusic	4/5 stars
PopMatters	(negative)

Feeding the Wheel is the fifth studio album by keyboardist Jordan Rudess of Dream Theater and Dixie Dregs fame. Many other musicians perform on tracks on this album including Terry Bozzio (Frank Zappa, Missing Persons), Steve Morse (Dixie Dregs, Deep Purple), and Dream Theater bandmate John Petrucci, who also worked with Rudess on Liquid Tension Experiment.

== Track listing ==
All pieces are composed by Jordan Rudess.

No.	Title	Length
1.	"The Voice (intro)"	0:19
2.	"Quantum Soup"	11:03
3.	"Shifting Sands"	6:02
4.	"Dreaming in Titanium"	4:10
5.	"Ucan Icon"	5:46
6.	"Center of the Sphere"	1:38
7.	"Crack the Meter"	6:13
8.	"Headspace"	4:00
9.	"Revolving Door"	8:39
10.	"Interstices"	4:05
11.	"Feed the Wheel"	10:12

== Personnel ==
- Jordan Rudess - All keyboards, electric guitar on track 3
- Terry Bozzio - All drums and percussion on tracks 2–7, 9, 11
- Steve Morse - Guitar solos on tracks 2, 7
- John Petrucci - Guitar on tracks 2, 5, 9, 11
- Eugene Friesen - Cello and voice on tracks 2, 4, 8, 9
- Billy Sheehan - Bass on track 7
- Mark Wood - Electric 7 string Viper on tracks 2, 5, 9, 11
- Barry Carl - Voice on track 1
- Peter Ernst - Nylon string guitar on track 3
- Bert Baldwin - Keyboard strings on track 5, vocal effects
