= Terminal Velocity (album) =

Studio album by John Petrucci
- Released: August 28, 2020
- Recorded: March–May 2020
- Studios: DTHQ, Long Island
- Genres: Instrumental rock, progressive rock, progressive metal
- Length: 55:05
- Labels: RenSam Songs; Sound Mind Music; The Orchard; Napalm Records
- Producer: John Petrucci

John Petrucci chronology
G3: Live in Tokyo (2005)	Terminal Velocity (2020)

Singles from Terminal Velocity
- 1. "Terminal Velocity" Released: August 7, 2020; 2. "Temple Of Circadia" Released: September 16, 2022

Terminal Velocity is the second studio album by Dream Theater guitarist John Petrucci, released digitally on August 28, 2020 and on October 30, 2020 for the physical version (vinyl and CD). This is his first solo album since 2005's Suspended Animation. During the recording sessions, Petrucci was reunited with his former Dream Theater bandmate Mike Portnoy, making it their first collaboration since the latter controversially left the band in 2010. Bassist Dave LaRue, who performed on Suspended Animation, returns for this album.

Petrucci planned to start working on the album in the second trimester of the year, but he ended up using the unexpected free time resulting from the New York COVID-19 lockdowns to write the songs. The whole writing and recording process took two months starting in March.

Some of the tracks ("Happy Song", "Glassy-Eyed Zombies") are new versions of songs Petrucci used to play live with G3, while "Gemini" has been used by the guitarist on soundchecks, guitar clinics and as a warm-up exercise for his Rock Discipline DVD.

== Track listing ==
All music is composed by John Petrucci

Terminal Velocity track listing
No.	Title	Length
1.	"Terminal Velocity"	6:07
2.	"The Oddfather"	6:25
3.	"Happy Song"	6:01
4.	"Gemini"	6:05
5.	"Out of the Blue"	5:46
6.	"Glassy-Eyed Zombies"	5:55
7.	"The Way Things Fall"	7:33
8.	"Snake in My Boot"	4:04
9.	"Temple of Circadia"	7:10
Total length:		55:05

== Personnel ==
Sources:

- John Petrucci – guitar, cowbell, production
- Mike Portnoy – drums
- Dave LaRue – bass guitar
- James "Jimmy T" Meslin – recording
- Andy Sneap - mixing, mastering
- Sean Mosher-Smith (Echo Designlab) – artwork

== Critical reception ==
Professional ratings
Review scores
Source	Rating
Prog	Favorable
Sonic Perspectives	9.3/10 stars
The Prog Report	Favorable
Ghost Cult Magazine	6/10 stars

Writing for Prog, Malcolm Dome expressed relief that "rather than running riot delivering a battalion of dazzling, overcomplicated and overly long solos, he's [Petrucci] kept everything tight and allowed these delightfully eclectic compositions to shine". He pointed out Passion and Warfare-era Steve Vai, Permanent Waves-era Rush and blues influences on "Terminal Velocity", "Happy Song" and "Out of the Blue", respectively, and said "Glass Eyed Zombies" could have been an Octavarium track. He also saw George Harrison and Buck Dharma influences on "The Way Things Fall" and "Snake in My Boot", respectively.

Sonic Perspectives' Rodrigo Altaf said "John pays homage to some of his heroes" and "explores different sides of his playing". He saw Joe Satriani's influences on the title-track and "Snake in My Boots" (sic!) and of Gary Moore and Rory Gallagher on "Out of the Blue"; and echoes of Liquid Tension Experiment on "The Oddfather" and of Dream Theater on "Temple of Circadia". He summarized his review calling Terminal Velocity "an uplifting release, with a diverse musical approach. Through an abundance of riffs, the listener is led on an epic and grandiose journey. Funky and pop in places, aggressive and heavy in others, it is an impressive showcase of fretboard wizardry, as it is of feel and penchant for melody".

On a positive review for The Prog Report, Kyle Fagala called Terminal Velocity "a balanced, yet eclectic album that works to display Petrucci's varied songwriting talents" and "a beautiful album from start to finish". He saw elements of Dream Theater on "The Oddfather" and "Temple of Circada" and of Joe Satriani, Eric Johnson, Avenged Sevenfold and Green Day on "Happy Song", while particularly praising "Out of the Blue" for reminding of Steve Vai's "Tender Surrender".

On a mixed review for Ghost Cult Magazine, Weslie Negrón considered that the album has "music that is made to show off the skills that 'x' or 'y' musician has in their instrument". He praised "The Oddfather" and "Out of the Blue", but considered the remaining tracks "just an exaggerated overflow of sweep picking arpeggios that makes the whole album sound like one long, boring track that lasts fifty minutes". He was also unimpressed with Portnoy's performance, stating it "does not exceed as the superb drummer he once was". He concluded his review by saying the album "feels like watered-down Dream Theater tracks and does not bring anything new or interesting for the genre".

== Charts ==
Chart performance for Terminal Velocity
Chart (2020)	Peak position
Austrian Albums (Ö3 Austria)	49
Belgian Albums (Ultratop Wallonia)	114
Dutch Albums (Album Top 100)	91
German Albums (Offizielle Top 100)	73
Hungarian Albums (MAHASZ)	21
Italian Albums (FIMI)	68
Scottish Albums (Official Charts)	50
Swiss Albums (Schweizer Hitparade)	13
