= The Road Not Taken (disambiguation) =

"The Road Not Taken" is a 1915 poem by Robert Frost.

The Road Not Taken may also refer to:

== Film ==
- The Roads Not Taken, a 2020 film
- The Road Not Taken (2026 film), a 2026 Chinese-Hong Kong film

== Music ==
- The Road Not Taken (album), a 1989 album by Shenandoah
- "The Road Not Taken", a song from the album Scenes from the Southside by Bruce Hornsby
- "The Road Not Taken", an adaptation of Frost's poem from the album Leverage by Lyriel
- "The Road Not Taken", an adaptation of Frost's poem in Frostiana: Seven Country Songs, composed in 1959 by Randall Thompson

== Television ==
- "The Road Not Taken" (Stargate SG-1), an episode of Stargate SG-1
- "The Road Not Taken" (Fringe), a 2008 episode of Fringe, season 1
- "The Road Not Taken", an episode of Highlander: The Series
- "The Road Not Taken", an episode of MacGyver, season 2
- "The Road Not Taken", an episode of The Orville, season 2
- "The Road Not Taken", an episodes of Touch, season 1

== Other uses ==
- "The Road Not Taken" (short story), a 1985 short story by Harry Turtledove
- Road Not Taken, a 2014 indie game developed by Spry Fox

== See also ==
- The Roads Not Taken, 2020 film
- Roads Not Taken: Tales of Alternate History, 1998 short story collection
- The Road Less Traveled (disambiguation)
