= Points North (album) =

Studio album by Points North
- Released: April 21, 2015
- Studio: Foothill College Studio 1100 (Los Altos Hills, California)
- Genre: Instrumental rock, progressive rock
- Length: 52:42
- Label: Magna Carta
- Producer: Eric Barnett; Danny Danzi associate; Dave de Villers associate

Points North chronology
Road Less Traveled (2012)	Points North (2015)

Points North is the second studio album by the instrumental rock band Points North. It was recorded at the Foothill College Studio 1100 and released on April 21, 2015, on Magna Carta Records.

This album is the group's first with bassist Uriah Duffy. It contains a track "Colorblind" that finds the band adding vocal elements to their previous all-instrumental portfolio. This album has found critical acclaim on rock and progressive rock review sites.

== Track listing ==
No.	Title	Length
1.	"Ignition"	3:58
2.	"Northstar"	4:37
3.	"Child's Play"	5:18
4.	"Sky Punch"	3:25
5.	"Rites of Passage"	5:25
6.	"Colorblind"	3:52
7.	"Harlequin"	5:08
8.	"Turning Point (La Villa De Villers)"	7:15
9.	"Redeye"	4:42
10.	"Foxes & Cougars"	5:19
11.	"Killer Pounder"	3:43
Total length:		52:42

== Personnel ==
- Eric Barnett – guitar
- Kevin Aiello – drums
- Uriah Duffy – bass

=== Additional personnel ===
- David Earl – keyboards, piano

=== Credits ===
- Eric Barnett – producer
- Danny Danzi – associate producer, mixing, mastering
- Dave de Villers – associate producer, recording engineer
- Ian Henry – recording engineer
- Chris Refino – recording engineer
- James Risher – recording engineer
- Anne-Marie Suenram – recording engineer
- Dave Lepori – band photo
- Fernando Ricciardulli – artwork, graphic design
- Laura Fielding – logistics, road crew
- Louis Green – logistics, road crew

Personnel list from AllMusic, additional personnel and credits from the CD artwork.
