= Jonathan Finn =

Jonathan Finn may refer to:

- Jon Finn (born 1958), an American rock musician and guitarist;
- Jonathan Finn, British software developer and co-founder of Sibelius Software, a music software company and co-creator of Sibelius (scorewriter), a popular score-writing program
