= Spontaneous Combustion (album) =

Studio album by Liquid Trio Experiment
- Released: October 23, 2007
- Recorded: October 1998
- Studio: Millbrook Sound Studios (Millbrook, NY)
- Genre: Jazz fusion, progressive rock
- Length: 78:06
- Label: Magna Carta
- Producer: Liquid Trio Experiment

Liquid Trio Experiment chronology
Liquid Tension Experiment 2 (1999)	Spontaneous Combustion (2007)	When the Keyboard Breaks: Live in Chicago (2009)

Spontaneous Combustion is an album by progressive metal group Liquid Trio Experiment, and is the result of the studio improvisations of Liquid Tension Experiment which occurred during John Petrucci's hiatus, while he spent time with his wife while she was giving birth. The remaining trio of Mike Portnoy, Tony Levin and Jordan Rudess continued to make music during this period. It was released on October 23, 2007. A few songs from Liquid Tension Experiment 2 were spawned from these jam sessions including "914", "Chewbacca", and "Liquid Dreams". The song "Chris & Kevin's Bogus Journey" is not a reference to Portnoy and Petrucci's former Dream Theater bandmates Chris Collins and Kevin Moore, but rather to the track on Liquid Tension Experiment's first album entitled "Chris & Kevin's Excellent Adventure", which is itself a reference to the band's photographer's habit of calling Mike Portnoy and Tony Levin "Chris and Kevin", even after being corrected several times. It is also a reference to the 1991 film Bill & Ted's Bogus Journey, the sequel to Bill & Ted's Excellent Adventure. The song "Jazz Odyssey" is a reference to the movie This Is Spinal Tap, in which Spinal Tap experiments with an improvisational song of the same name.

While the jams were improvised in 1998, it took until 2007 to release them, as the master tapes of the jams were somehow misplaced before they were delivered to Magna Carta. The recordings on the album (and "the only remaining records of these sessions in existence") were taken from Portnoy's 2-track stereo DAT.

== Track listing ==
No.	Title	Length
1.	"Chris & Kevin's Bogus Journey"	7:54
2.	"Hot Rod"	6:21
3.	"RPP"	3:06
4.	"Hawaiian Funk"	4:39
5.	"Cappuccino"	3:26
6.	"Jazz Odyssey"	8:49
7.	"Fire Dance"	8:23
8.	"The Rubberband Man"	6:52
9.	"Holes"	4:38
10.	"Tony's Nightmare"	2:49
11.	"Boom Boom"	6:33
12.	"Return of the Rubberband Man"	9:43
13.	"Disneyland Symphony"	4:47

== Personnel ==
- Jordan Rudess - keyboards
- Tony Levin - bass
- Mike Portnoy - drums, percussion
- Chris Cubeta - engineering
- Jim Brick - mastering
