= Road Less Traveled (Points North album) =

Studio album by Points North
- Released: March 13, 2012
- Studio: Foothill College Studio 1100 (Los Altos Hills, California)
- Genre: Instrumental rock, progressive rock
- Length: 50:48
- Label: Magna Carta
- Producer: Eric Barnett with assistance from Dave de Villers

Points North chronology
Road Less Traveled (2012)	Points North (2015)

Road Less Traveled is the first studio album by the instrumental rock band Points North. It was recorded at the Foothill College Studio 1100 and released on March 13, 2012 on Magna Carta Records.

The album has been met with positive reviews with the music being compared with artists such as Joe Satriani, Steve Morse and Rush with a strong melodic sensibility. The track "Steve's Morsels" is a nod to guitarist Steve Morse and "Grace Under Pressure" is a tribute to the band Rush.

== Track listing ==
No.	Title	Length
1.	"Vast Horizons"	3:32
2.	"High Wire"	4:19
3.	"The Phoenix"	4:43
4.	"Grace Under Pressure"	6:04
5.	"Barney"	4:24
6.	"Jubilee"	3:41
7.	"Steve's Morsels"	4:03
8.	"The Source"	4:35
9.	"Delay Song"	3:37
10.	"Maiden Voyage"	5:53
11.	"Sweet Solitude"	5:57
Total length:		50:48

== Personnel ==
- Eric Barnett - guitar, producer
- Kevin Aiello - drums
- Damien Sisson - bass

=== Credits ===
- Danny Danzi - audio consultation, mastering - Danziland Studios, Williamstown, NJ
- Dave de Villers - chief engineer, production assistant
- Laura Fielding - logistics
- John Gentry - cover art, design, graphics
- Louis Green - logistics
- Sheri Green - logistics
- Rob Heacock - studio drum tech
- Ken Kilen - additional engineer
- BZ Lewis - mixing @ Studio 132 Oakland, CA
- Chris Refino - assistant engineer, ProTools operator

Personnel and credits from CD artwork and AllMusic
