= Uriah Duffy =

American musician

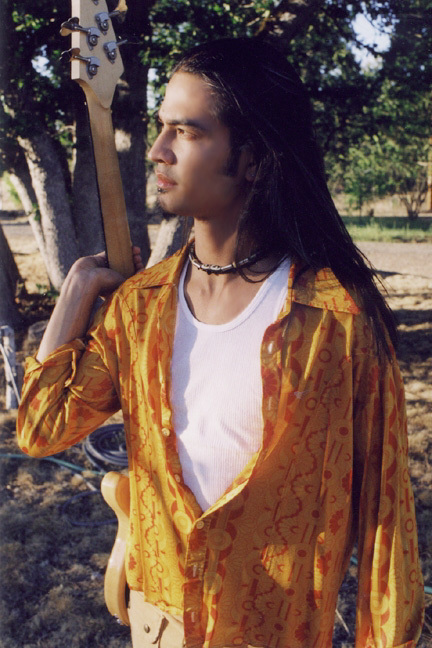

Uriah Duffy (31 July 1975, Wakefield, Rhode Island, United States) is an American bassist. He is best known as the former bassist of Whitesnake. He is currently the bassist of the California-based progressive rock band Points North.

An internationally endorsed musician, Uriah is known for his versatility, with chops ranging from Funk, R&B, Jazz, Hip-Hop, House, Rock, Metal and Gospel.

== Has been a member of/played with ==
- Mindi Abair (Jazz sax - Touring dates)
- Points North (2012 – present) – progressive rock
- Liv Warfield (Domestic and International Touring)
- Whitesnake (National and World Tours; 2 albums, 2005-2010) – rock
- The Family Stone (2001 - 2004)
- Christina Aguilera (CD: Stripped, 2002) – R&B
- Alicia Keys (Studio Recording, 2002) – R&B
- Robert Stewart – various live dates from 1997 to 2016
- Goaplé (CD: Closer, 2001) – R&B
- Sly & the Family Stone (3rd bassist, 2003–2005) – funk
- GQ (Various Dates) – funk/disco
- Tony Toni Toné (Various Dates/TV) – R&B
- Too $hort (Hometown oakland shows) – dirty rap
- Lyrics Born (Regional and World Tours; TV appearances; Studio tracks) – rap/hip-hop/funk
- Chris Clouse (Various live performances since 2002)
- Pat Travers/Carmine
- Appice (2004 CD) – rock
- Flametal (Current work) – flamenco/metal
- The Coup (Shows and latest album) – rap/hip-hop
- First A.M.E. Church, LA (2004) – gospel

== Discography ==
- 1998 - Rupert "Ojiji" Harvey - Once a Lion | Reggae
- 1999 - Femmes Fatales - Same | R&B Diva Duet
- 1999 - Spunjunket - HumansBeingSpun | Funk, rock, ska
- 2000 - Sterling Williams - The Star Motel | Spoken word/poetry
- 2001 - Sonia D. | R&B/acid jazz
- 2001 - VaporRub - Take the Red Pill | Hard rock
- 2001 - Ché - Ché | Adult contemporary
- 2001 - Realistic - RealisticBigBand | Drum & bass
- 2001 - Goapalé - Goapalé | R&B
- 2002 - Baby Ray - In Yo' Face | Rap
- 2002 - Trance Thompson - Hypnatic | Soulful rock
- 2002 - Martin Luther - Rebel Soul Music | Soul, funk, rock
- 2002 - SoulFolk - Brutha From Anutha Planet | Soul
- 2002 - Resurrection Power - Live - Fullness of Joy| Gospel
- 2002 - Gabriel Colbert - Gabriel Colbert | R&B
- 2002 - Christina Aguilera - Stripped | R&B
- 2002 - Sakai - Dream Big | R&B
- 2003 - Chris Clouse - Trace Elements | Alt rock
- 2003 - Krickie - Sweet Spell | Folk rock
- 2003 - Kiff Gallagher - KG | R&B
- 2003 - Danny Jones - Finding My Way | Guitar rock
- 2004 - Jesse Brewster - Confessional | Songwriter
- 2004 - Carmine Appice/Pat Travers- T'nA | Rock
- 2004 - LaToya London | R&B (not released)
- 2005 - Chris Catena | Rock (not released)
- 2005 - Latrice Barnett | Illuminate | House
- 2005 - Andy Caldwell | House trax
- 2006 - Destani Wolf | Again and Again | RnB
- 2006 - The Coup | Pick a Bigger Weapon | Rap
- 2006 - Whitesnake | Live: In the Shadow of the Blues
- 2008 - Lyrics Born | Everywhere at Once
- 2008 - Whitesnake | Good to Be Bad
- 2008 - Keno Mapp | Heart Touch
- 2009 - Chris Catena Discovery | Escape Music
- 2010 - Dr.U (Chris Catena) Alieni Alienati | Valery Records/Edel
- 2015 - Points North | Points North
- 2019 - Chris Catena Re-Discovery | IMR
- 2019 - Valor |Fight for Your Life| CFZ Studios
