= Meanstreak (band) =

American heavy metal band

- Origin: Westchester, New York, United States
- Genres: Heavy metal, thrash metal, power metal
- Years active: 1985–1994, 2023–present
- Label: Mercenary Records
- Members: Bettina France; Rena Sands; Yael Rallis
- Past members: Marlene Apuzzo Portnoy; Lisa Martens Myung; Charisse Texeira; Diane Keyser

Meanstreak is an American all-female thrash metal band from Rockland, New York, United States. According to Spirit of Metal, Meanstreak was one of the first all-female thrash metal bands in history.

== History ==
The band was founded by guitarists Marlene Apuzzo and Rena Sands. Bettina France joined as singer, Lisa Pace played bass guitar, and Diane Keyser was on drums. Keyser left the band shortly after Roadkill was recorded, and was replaced by Yael, who later went on to join My Ruin. Rena Sands, Lisa Pace and Marlene Apuzzo all married present members of the band Dream Theater. Sands, Pace and Apuzzo respectively wed guitarist John Petrucci, bassist John Myung and drummer Mike Portnoy.

Meanstreak (Marlene, Rena, Bettina, & Yael) reunited in 2023 and was the sole opening act for Petrucci's first solo multi-gig tour, which included Dave LaRue on bass and Mike Portnoy on drums. Meanstreak was also planning on hitting the studio and re-recording songs from their 1990s demos as well as some new material according to their Facebook announcement. On January 19, the band announced they were releasing a new EP, Blood Moon, on February 2.

On September 1, 2024, Marlene Apuzzo Portnoy announced she was retiring from the band and Martens Myung followed suit after playing a live show at the Whisky A Go Go in Los Angeles. Meanstreak continues to record and tour with original members Bettina France on vocals, Yael Rallis on drums and Rena Sands Petrucci on guitar and have recently added Irene Eliopoulos on bass, most recently opening for Zebra at Westbury Music Fair on Long Island, New York. They are currently working on new material and will be performing at John Petrucci's Guitar Universe 5.0 in August, 2025.

== Band members ==
Current

- Irene Eliopoulos - bass
- Bettina France – vocals
- Yael Rallis – drums
- Rena Sands – guitars

Former

- Marlene Apuzzo Portnoy – guitars
- Lisa Martens Myung – bass
- Charisse Texeira – bass
- Diane Keyser – drums
- Zoe Hirshfield - drums
- Jennifer Castle - bass
- Irene Wohlman - bass

== Discography ==
Studio albums

- Roadkill (1988)

EPs

- Blood Moon (2024)

Demos

- The Other Side (1989)
- The Dark Gift (1992)
