= Tony Levin =

American bassist (born 1946)

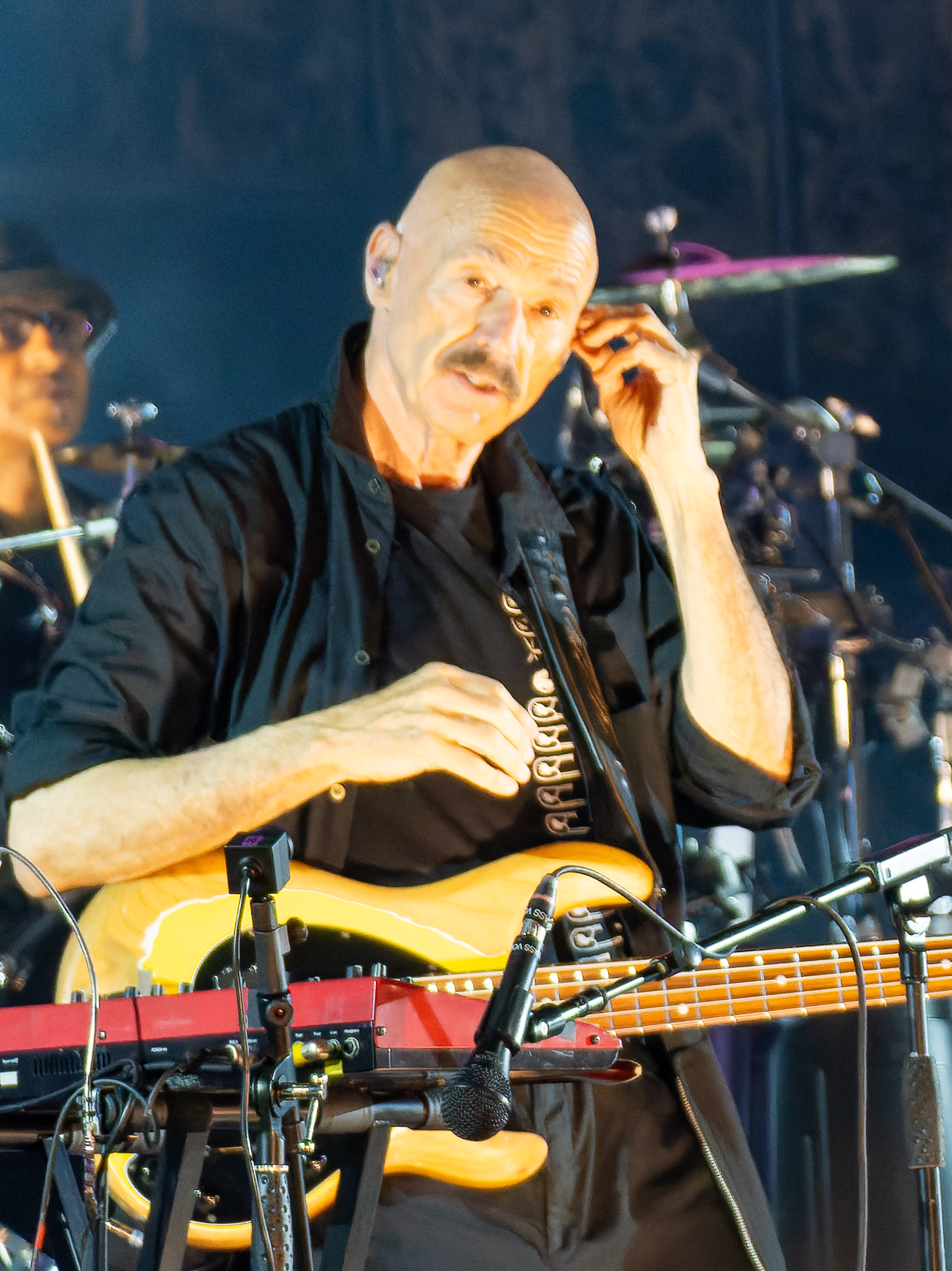
- Levin in 2023

Background information
- Born: Anthony Frederick Levin; June 6, 1946 (age 80); Boston, Massachusetts, U.S.
- Genres: Progressive rock; jazz fusion; progressive metal; pop rock; world music
- Occupations: Musician; songwriter; composer
- Instruments: Bass guitar; Chapman Stick; upright bass; vocals; synthesizer
- Years active: 1968–present
- Label: Papa Bear
- Member of: Peter Gabriel; Stick Men; Liquid Tension Experiment; Beat
- Formerly of: King Crimson; Bruford Levin Upper Extremities; Anderson Bruford Wakeman Howe; Bozzio Levin Stevens
- Website: tonylevin.com papabear.com

Anthony Frederick Levin (born June 6, 1946) is an American musician and composer specializing in electric bass guitars, Chapman Stick and upright bass. He also sings and plays synthesizer. Levin is best known for his work with King Crimson (1981–1984, 1994–1998, 2008, 2011, 2014–2021) and Peter Gabriel (since 1977). He is also a member of Liquid Tension Experiment (1997–1999, 2008–2009, 2020–present), Bruford Levin Upper Extremities (1998–2000) and HoBoLeMa (2008–2010). He has led his own band, Stick Men, since 2010.

A prolific session musician since the 1970s, Levin has played on over 500 albums. Some notable sessions include work with John Lennon, Herbie Mann, Sarah McLachlan, Paula Cole, Stevie Nicks, Pink Floyd, Robbie Robertson, Eumir Deodato, Paul Simon, Lou Reed, David Bowie, Joan Armatrading, Tom Waits, Buddy Rich, The Roches, Todd Rundgren, Seal, Warren Zevon, Bryan Ferry, Laurie Anderson, Kate & Anna McGarrigle, Gibonni, Chuck Mangione and Jean-Pierre Ferland. He has toured with artists including Paul Simon (with whom he appeared in the 1980 film One-Trick Pony), Gary Burton, James Taylor, Judy Collins, Carly Simon, Peter Frampton, Tim Finn, Richie Sambora, Ivano Fossati, Claudio Baglioni and Lawrence Gowan.

Levin helped to popularize the Chapman Stick and the NS electric upright bass. He also created "funk fingers", modified drumsticks that attach to the fingers of the player in order to strike the bass strings, adding a distinctive percussive "slap" sound used in funk bass playing. In 2011, Levin ranked #2 behind John Paul Jones of Led Zeppelin in the "20 Most Underrated Bass Guitarists" in Paste magazine. In July 2020, Levin was ranked #42 on the "50 Greatest Bassists of All Time" list by Rolling Stone magazine.

== Biography ==
=== Early life and education ===
Anthony Frederick Levin was born on June 6, 1946, in Boston, Massachusetts. He grew up in a Reform Jewish household in the suburb of Brookline. He began playing double bass at 10 years old, primarily studying classical music. In high school, he learned tuba, soloing with the concert band, and also started a barbershop quartet.

After high school, he attended the Eastman School of Music in Rochester, New York and played in the Rochester Philharmonic Orchestra. Also at Eastman, he studied with drummer Steve Gadd. He traded in his Ampeg electric upright "Baby Bass" for a Fender Precision Bass; in the early days his first bass amplifier was an Ampeg Portaflex B-15. Levin's first recording was in 1968, when he and Gadd played on Diana in the Autumn Wind, Gap Mangione's first solo album.

=== 1970s–1980s ===
In 1970, Levin moved to New York City, joining a band called Aha, the Attack of the Green Slime Beast, with Don Preston of The Mothers of Invention. Soon after, he began working as a session musician, and through the 1970s he played bass on many albums, including Buddy Rich's big band jazz album, The Roar of '74, and Paul Simon's Still Crazy After All These Years in 1975.

In 1971, John McLaughlin asked Levin to join his new project, the Mahavishnu Orchestra: "My original choice for bass was Tony Levin. But he told me, 'Oh man, I just took a gig with Gary Burton.'" From 1973 to 1975, Levin and Steve Gadd played in the band of veteran jazz flautist Herbie Mann. Two of Levin's early compositions (“Daffodil” and “Music Is a Game We Play”) were featured on the 1973 Mann album First Light.

In 1976, Levin helped create the lush textures on Andy Pratt's Resolution album, which featured numerous notable musicians including Arif Mardin, Andy Newmark, Hugh McDonald, Luther Vandross, and Levin's frequent rhythm section partner Steve Gadd. Allmusic.com and Rolling Stone magazine rated this album as one of the best singer/songwriter albums of the 1970s.

In 1977, Levin joined Peter Gabriel's band. He had met Gabriel through producer Bob Ezrin with whom Levin had recorded Alice Cooper's Welcome to My Nightmare and Lou Reed's Berlin. Levin has been Gabriel's bass player of choice ever since. On Gabriel's first solo album, Levin played tuba as well, and directed and sang with a barbershop quartet on "Excuse Me". Levin has been the bassist on all of Gabriel's studio albums with a few exceptions (e.g., John Giblin's fretless bass playing on Peter Gabriel III, some additional work by Larry Klein and Bill Laswell on So). Gabriel nicknamed Levin the “Emperor of the Bottom End.”

In his years with Gabriel, Levin developed two unique aspects of his playing: further advancement on the Chapman Stick, which he would later utilize heavily in King Crimson, and invented funk fingers which are short drumsticks strapped to the fingers to strike the bass strings, resulting in a very percussive effect. Levin credits Gabriel with the concept and his tech Andy Moore with actually making them workable.

In 1978, Levin moved to Woodstock, New York, to join the band L'Image, which included his old friend Steve Gadd as well as Mike Mainieri and Warren Bernhardt. The band broke up after a year, though Levin decided to stay in the area: he currently resides in Kingston, New York. This Ill-fated group would reunite much later in Levin's career. On the first day of recording Peter Gabriel's first album in late 1976, Levin met both Peter Gabriel and King Crimson guitarist/composer Robert Fripp for the first time, and in 1978 he played on Fripp's solo album Exposure. This would lead Levin to become a member of the 1981–1984 incarnation of King Crimson, along with Fripp, guitarist/vocalist Adrian Belew, and drummer Bill Bruford. Levin recorded four studio albums as part of King Crimson: Discipline (1981), Beat (1982), Three of a Perfect Pair (1984) and THRAK (1995), all critically acclaimed.

In 1980, Levin participated in the sessions for John Lennon and Yoko Ono's Double Fantasy album. In 1987, Levin played the bass and Chapman Stick parts on the Pink Floyd album A Momentary Lapse of Reason. In 1988 Bruford asked Levin to be an "unofficial fifth member" in the Yes-related supergroup Anderson Bruford Wakeman Howe, which consisted of all the members from the classic Yes lineup except bassist Chris Squire, though Levin only performed as a session player on the group's eponymous album. Due to illness, he was unable to play on some of the final dates of the accompanying tour, being replaced by Jeff Berlin. Levin also played on the Yes album Union in 1991.

In 1984 Levin released Road Photos, a collection of black and white photos taken during his travels with King Crimson, Gabriel, Simon, and others. Another book of photos focusing on King Crimson's travels in the 1980s, The Crimson Chronicles volume 1, was released in 2004. Levin has also written a book of career anecdotes and road stories called Beyond the Bass Clef.

=== 1990s–2000s ===
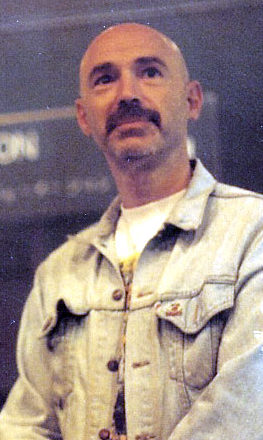
Levin in 1993

Levin was part of King Crimson again from 1994 to 1997 as part of the "Double Trio" line-up of the band which consisted of Levin, Robert Fripp, Adrian Belew, Trey Gunn, Pat Mastelotto, and Bill Bruford. Levin also took part in two of experimental King Crimson sub-groups: ProjeKct One (1997) and ProjeKct Four (1998). Levin played bass on "Watcher of the Skies" from Steve Hackett's Genesis Revisited album (1996). He was very busy in the late 1990s with his own groups Bruford Levin Upper Extremities, Bozzio Levin Stevens, and Liquid Tension Experiment.

In 1998, Levin and Bruford formed Bruford Levin Upper Extremities with trumpeter Chris Botti and guitarist David Torn; they released one studio album in 1998 and a live double album in 2000. Torn, Levin, and Bruford had worked with trumpeter Mark Isham for Torn's album Cloud About Mercury. Levin also continued recording albums with his own band, consisting of drummer/saxophonist/vocalist Jerry Marotta, guitarist Jesse Gress, synthesizer programmer/player Larry Fast, and Levin's brother, keyboardist Pete Levin. He also regularly played (and occasionally recorded) with the California Guitar Trio when their schedules permitted.

In 1997, Levin teamed up with Mike Portnoy and John Petrucci, members of Dream Theater, as well as future Dream Theater keyboardist Jordan Rudess, for a project called Liquid Tension Experiment. The combo released two albums, Liquid Tension Experiment and Liquid Tension Experiment 2 in 1998 and 1999 respectively, as well as playing short tours in 1998 and 2008. There have also been two CDs of material released under the name "Liquid Trio Experiment"; the first composed of studio jams from sessions without Petrucci (Spontaneous Combustion), released for the band's tenth anniversary, and a live recording from a 2008 Chicago show where Rudess's equipment failed and the other three covered for it with a nearly hour-long improvisation (When the Keyboard Breaks). During the COVID-19 global pandemic, the group reconvened and recorded Liquid Tension Experiment 3.

At the end of 2003 Trey Gunn left King Crimson and Levin rejoined as the bassist, although the band was only active for a handful of rehearsals at that time. In 2006, Levin released Resonator, The first album to feature Levin as a lyricist and lead vocalist. 2007 saw the release of Stick Man, an album of pieces recorded on the Chapman Stick. In 2008, Levin joined King Crimson's 40th Anniversary Tour, in a lineup including Fripp, Belew, Mastelotto, and Harrison. He holds the record as King Crimson’s longest-serving bassist overall.

In 2009 Levin reunited with his band from 1978, L'Image, featuring Mike Mainieri, Warren Bernhardt, David Spinozza, and Steve Gadd. The group performed at the Iridium Jazz Club in New York City, toured Japan, and released the album L'Image 2.0. In 2010 Levin toured with HoBoLeMa, a group consisting of Allan Holdsworth on guitar, Terry Bozzio on drums, Levin on bass, and Pat Mastelotto on drums. All their shows were completely improvised with no written music.

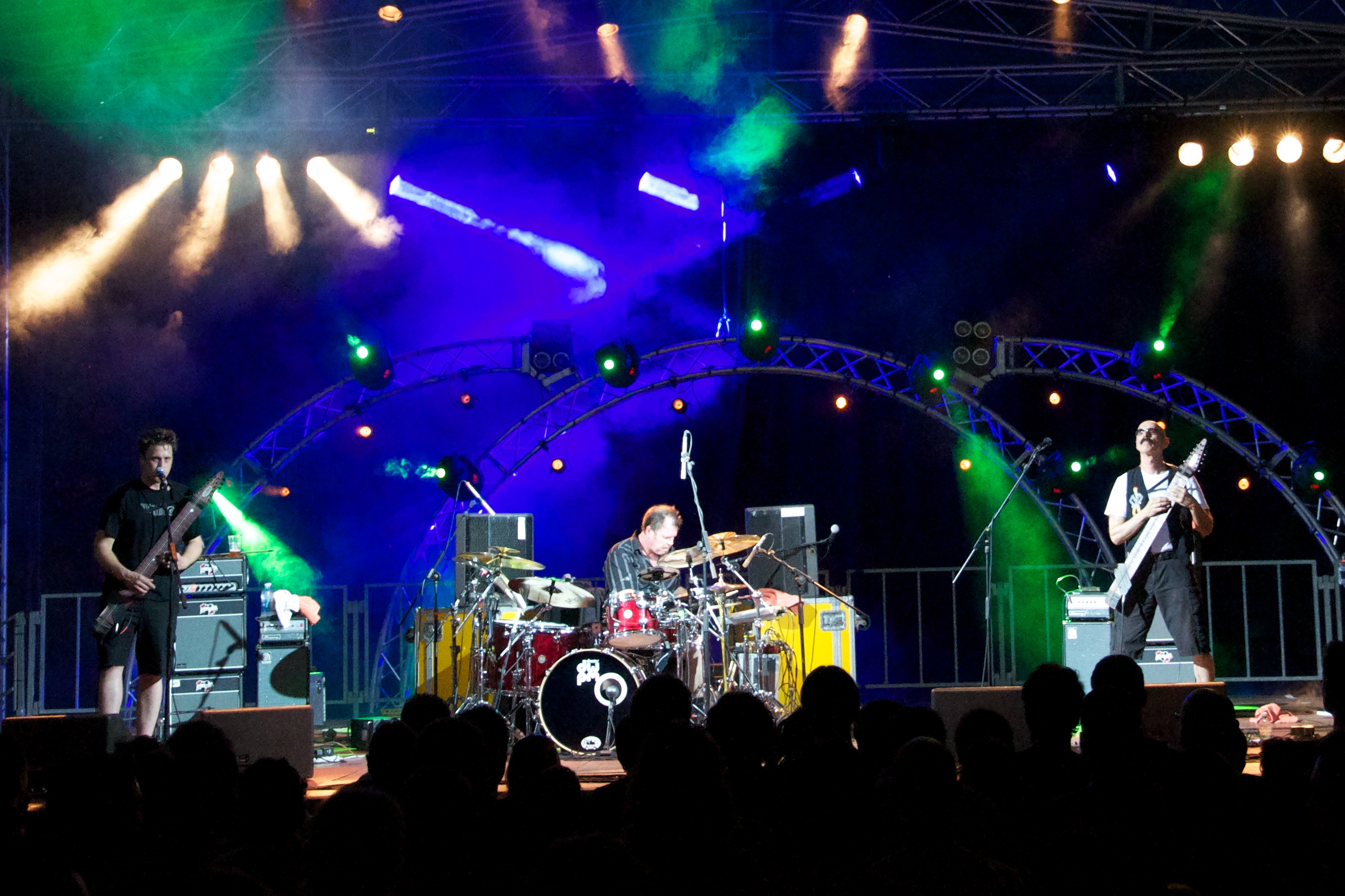
Stick Men in Misinto, Italy, 2010

Building upon the Stick Man album, Levin joined up with Michael Bernier and Pat Mastelotto to form the group Stick Men. The band released its first album Soup in 2010. Bernier left the group shortly after the release of Soup and was replaced by touch guitarist Markus Reuter. This lineup has continued with a busy touring and recording schedule, with their most recent recording Tentacles released in 2022.

Levin's brother, Pete Levin, is a New York keyboardist and writer who is known for his work with Gil Evans. In the 1970s, Tony and Pete collaborated with Steve Gadd in the comedy band The Clams. Levin has stated that some of the Clams' material may eventually be released. Levin also played on Jean-Pierre Ferland's Jaune album, which included hits "Le petit roi" and "Le chat du café des artistes".

On September 24, 2013, Levin was officially announced as a member of the eighth incarnation of King Crimson, alongside band founder Robert Fripp, guitarist Jakko Jakszyk, the returning Mel Collins on saxophone, drummers Pat Mastelotto and Gavin Harrison, and new member Bill Rieflin. The group toured the United States in the autumn of 2014 and continued to tour throughout the world until 2021, including 2019 when King Crimson celebrated its 50th anniversary.

In 2024, Levin and former King Crimson member Adrian Belew announced the creation of the supergroup Beat, which includes guitarist Steve Vai and drummer Danny Carey. With the approval of Robert Fripp, this group performs material from the early 1980s incarnation of King Crimson. In September 2024, Levin released the solo album Bringing It Down to the Bass, featuring guest appearances with many of his former bandmates and collaborators.

== Influence ==
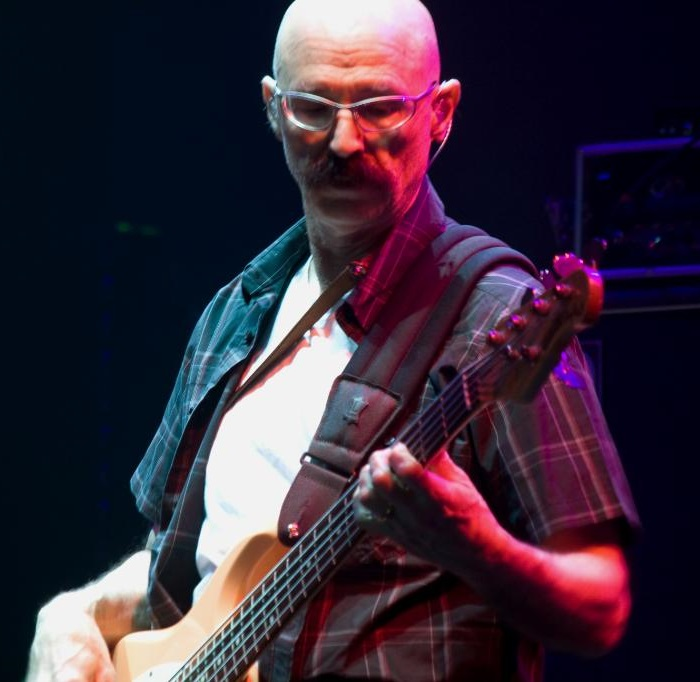
Levin performing live with Liquid Tension Experiment at NEARfest 2008

Many artists have cited Levin as an influence or have expressed their admiration for him, including Les Claypool of Primus, Colin Hodgkinson, Nick Beggs, Al Barrow of Magnum, Dan Briggs of Between the Buried and Me, Zach Cooper of Coheed and Cambria and Jonathan Hischke of Dot Hacker and El Grupo Nuevo de Omar Rodriguez Lopez.

== Personal life ==
Levin met Andi Turco in 1995 when she was promoting Virgin Records in Atlanta. They married three years later. Andi Turco-Levin ran for mayor of Kingston, New York, in 2011, and for Ulster County Legislature in 2019, both campaigns unsuccessful. Turco-Levin is credited with backing vocals on the album Resonator (2006) and for photography on Levin Minnemann Rudess (2013). Levin has one child, filmmaker Maggie Levin. In 2003, Levin stated that he is a vegetarian.

== Discography ==
As a primary contributor

Date	Artists	Title
1995	Tony Levin	World Diary
2000	Tony Levin	Waters of Eden
2002	Tony Levin	Pieces of the Sun
2002	Tony Levin	Double Espresso
2006	Tony Levin	Resonator
2007	Tony Levin	Stick Man
2019	Tony Levin	The Bucket List
2024	Tony Levin	Bringing It Down to the Bass
1974	Herbie Mann	First Light as The Family of Mann
1976	Herbie Mann	Surprises
1974 [1976]	Herbie Mann	Gagaku & Beyond
1977	Herbie Mann	Brazil: Once Again
1977	Peter Gabriel	Peter Gabriel (Car)
1978	Peter Gabriel	Peter Gabriel (Scratch)
1980	Peter Gabriel	Peter Gabriel (Melt)
1982	Peter Gabriel	Peter Gabriel (Security)
1983	Peter Gabriel	Plays Live
1985	Peter Gabriel	Birdy
1986	Peter Gabriel	So
1992	Peter Gabriel	Us
1994	Peter Gabriel	Secret World Live
2000	Peter Gabriel	OVO
2002	Peter Gabriel	Up
2003	Peter Gabriel	Growing Up Live
2005	Peter Gabriel	Still Growing Up: Live & Unwrapped
2014	Peter Gabriel	Back to Front: Live in London
2023	Peter Gabriel	i/o
1981	King Crimson	Discipline
1982	King Crimson	Beat
1982	King Crimson	The Noise: Frejus (VHS) / Neal and Jack and Me (DVD)
1984	King Crimson	Three of a Perfect Pair
1984	King Crimson	Three of a Perfect Pair: Live in Japan (VHS) / Neal and Jack and Me (DVD)
1998	King Crimson	Absent Lovers: Live in Montreal
1994	King Crimson	Vrooom
1995	King Crimson	THRAK
1995	King Crimson	B'Boom: Live in Argentina
1996	King Crimson	Thrakattak
1996	King Crimson	Live in Japan (VHS) / Déjà Vrooom (DVD) / The Collectable King Crimson Volume Five (Live in Japan 1995 – The Official Edition)
1999	King Crimson	Live in Mexico City
2001	King Crimson	Vrooom Vrooom
1999	King Crimson	The ProjeKcts
1999	King Crimson	The Deception of the Thrush: A Beginners' Guide to ProjeKcts
2012	King Crimson	Live in Argentina, 1994 (DVD-A)
2014–2017	King Crimson	The Elements of King Crimson
2015	King Crimson	Live at the Orpheum
2015	King Crimson	Live EP 2014 (Vinyl Cyclops Picture Disc)
2016	King Crimson	Live In Toronto
2016	King Crimson	Radical Action to Unseat the Hold of Monkey Mind
2017	King Crimson	Heroes – Live In Europe (2016)
2017	King Crimson	Live In Chicago (2017 – Chicago Theater)
2018	King Crimson	Live in Vienna (2016 – Museumsquartier)
2018	King Crimson	Meltdown: Live in Mexico City (2017 – Teatro Metropólitan)
2024	King Crimson	Sheltering Skies (Live in Fréjus, August 27th 1982)
1989	Anderson Bruford Wakeman Howe	Anderson Bruford Wakeman Howe
2012	Anderson Bruford Wakeman Howe	Live at the NEC
1991	Yes	Union
1997	Gorn, Levin, Marotta	From the Caves of the Iron Mountain
1997	Bozzio Levin Stevens	Black Light Syndrome
2000	Bozzio Levin Stevens	Situation Dangerous
1998	ProjeKct One	Live at the Jazz Café
1999	ProjeKct Four	West Coast Live
2007	Liquid Trio Experiment	Spontaneous Combustion
1998	Liquid Tension Experiment	Liquid Tension Experiment
1999	Liquid Tension Experiment	Liquid Tension Experiment 2
2021	Liquid Tension Experiment	Liquid Tension Experiment 3
2009	Liquid Trio Experiment 2	When the Keyboard Breaks: Live in Chicago
2009	Liquid Tension Experiment	Liquid Tension Experiment Live 2008 – Limited Edition Boxset
2009	Liquid Tension Experiment	Liquid Tension Experiment Live in NYC
2009	Liquid Tension Experiment	Liquid Tension Experiment Live in LA
1998	Bruford Levin Upper Extremities	Bruford Levin Upper Extremities
2000	Bruford Levin Upper Extremities	B.L.U.E. Nights
2008	Steven Wilson	Insurgentes (Kscope) on tracks 5 and 6
2011	Steven Wilson	Grace for Drowning (Kscope)
2009	Stick Men	Stick Men [A special edition]
2010	Stick Men	Soup
2011	Stick Men	Absalom(EP)
2011	Stick Men	Live In Montevideo 2011
2011	Stick Men	Live In Buenos Aires 2011
2012	Stick Men	Open
2013	Stick Men	Deep
2014	Stick Men	Power Play
2014	Stick Men	Unleashed: Live Improvs 2013
2014	Stick Men	Supercollider: An Anthology 2010–2014
2015	Stick Men	Midori: Live In Tokyo (Featuring David Cross)
2016	Stick Men	Prog Noir
2017	Stick Men	Roppongi – Live In Tokyo 2017 (Featuring Mel Collins)
2017	Stick Men	KONNEKTED
2011	Jakszyk, Fripp and Collins (with Levin and Harrison)	A King Crimson ProjeKct A Scarcity of Miracles
2011	Tony Levin, David Torn, Alan White	Levin Torn White
2013	Tony Levin, Marco Minnemann, Jordan Rudess	Levin Minnemann Rudess
2015	Anthony Curtis and Tony Levin	Book of the Key
2019	Keaggy, Marotta, and Levin	The Bucket List
1972	Chuck Mangione Quartet	Alive!

As a session musician (partial list)

- Jaune (1970) – Jean-Pierre Ferland
- Carly Simon (1971) – Carly Simon
- Don McLean (1972) – Don McLean
- Berlin (1973) – Lou Reed
- Over the Rainbow (1973) – Livingston Taylor
- The Roar of '74 (1973) – Buddy Rich
- Playin' Favorites (1973) – Don McLean
- Simba (Groove Merchant, 1974) – O'Donel Levy
- Still Crazy After All These Years (1975) – Paul Simon
- Welcome To My Nightmare (1975) – Alice Cooper
- Judith (1975) – Judy Collins
- Second Childhood (1976) – Phoebe Snow
- Goes to Hell (1976) – Alice Cooper
- Main Squeeze (1976) – Chuck Mangione
- Lace and Whiskey (1977) – Alice Cooper
- Never Letting Go (1977) – Phoebe Snow
- Singin'... (1977) – Melissa Manchester
- Ringo the 4th (1977) – Ringo Starr
- Watermark (1977) – Art Garfunkel
- Nested (1978) – Laura Nyro
- Boys in the Trees (1978) – Carly Simon
- The Roches (1979) – The Roches
- Spy (1979) – Carly Simon
- Double Fantasy (1980) – John Lennon, Yoko Ono
- Me Myself I (1980) – Joan Armatrading
- Come Upstairs (1980) – Carly Simon
- Walk Under Ladders (1981) – Joan Armatrading
- Scissors Cut (1981) – Art Garfunkel
- Season of Glass (1981) – Yoko Ono
- It's Alright (I See Rainbows) (1982) – Yoko Ono
- Keep On Doing (1982) – The Roches
- Times of Our Lives (1982) – Judy Collins
- Scenario by Al Di Meola also with Phil Collins, Jan Hammer and Bill Bruford - (1983)
- The Key (1983) – Joan Armatrading
- Hello Big Man (1983) – Carly Simon
- Shine (1984) – Frida
- Milk and Honey (1984) – John Lennon, Yoko Ono
- Brothers in Arms (1985) – Dire Straits
- Boys and Girls (1985) – Bryan Ferry
- Starpeace (1985) – Yoko Ono
- Strange Animal (1985) – Lawrence Gowan
- That's Why I'm Here (1985) – James Taylor
- Downtown (1985) – Marshall Crenshaw
- Rain Dogs (1985) – Tom Waits
- Cloud About Mercury (ECM, 1986) – David Torn
- The Big Picture (1986) – Michael W. Smith
- Premonition (1986) – Peter Frampton
- Park Hotel (1986) – Alice
- A Momentary Lapse of Reason (1987) – Pink Floyd
- Robbie Robertson (1987) – Robbie Robertson
- Great Dirty World (1987) – Lawrence Gowan
- Coming Around Again (1987) – Carly Simon
- Cher (1987) – Cher
- Sentimental Hygiene (1987) – Warren Zevon
- Safety in Numbers (1987) – David Van Tieghem
- Julia Fordham (1988) – Julia Fordham
- Tommy Page (1988) – Tommy Page
- Hide Your Heart (1988) – Bonnie Tyler
- Amnesia (1988) – Richard Thompson
- The Other Side of the Mirror (1989) – Stevie Nicks
- Maria McKee (1989) – Maria McKee
- Tim Finn (1989) – Tim Finn
- "100 Stunden am Tag" (1989) - Boris Bukowski
- Lost Brotherhood (1990) – Lawrence Gowan
- World Gone Strange (1991) – Andy Summers
- Stranger in This Town (1991) – Richie Sambora
- Discipline (1991) – Desmond Child
- New Moon Shine (1991) – James Taylor
- Matters of the Heart (1992) – Tracy Chapman
- Arkansas Traveler (1992) – Michelle Shocked
- Flyer (1994) – Nanci Griffith
- Swamp Ophelia (1994) – Indigo Girls
- What's Inside (1995) – Joan Armatrading
- This Fire (1996) – Paula Cole
- Gravity (1996) – Jesse Cook
- The Cappuccino Songs (1998) – Tanita Tikaram
- By 7:30 (1999) – Vonda Shepard
- Amen (1999) – Paula Cole
- Snowfall on the Sahara (1999) – Natalie Cole
- Aura (2001) – Asia
- My Ride's Here (2002) – Warren Zevon
- Heathen (2002) – David Bowie
- Afterglow (2003) – Sarah McLachlan
- Courage (2007) – Paula Cole
- Ithaca (2010) – Paula Cole
- The Next Day (2013) – David Bowie
- The Desired Effect (2015) – Brandon Flowers
- Troika (2022) - D'Virgilio, Morse, & Jennings
- So Many Words (2026) - Alan Morse
