= G3: Live in Tokyo =

Live album

Live album by Joe Satriani, Steve Vai and John Petrucci
- Released: October 25, 2005
- Recorded: May 8, 2005
- Venues: Tokyo International Forum (Tokyo, Japan)
- Genres: Instrumental rock, hard rock
- Length: 101:04
- Label: Epic
- Producers: Joe Satriani; Steve Vai; John Petrucci

Joe Satriani chronology
Is There Love in Space? (2004)	G3: Live in Tokyo (2005)	Super Colossal (2006)

Steve Vai chronology
Live in London (2004)	G3: Live in Tokyo (2005)	Sound Theories Vol. I & II (2007)

John Petrucci chronology
Suspended Animation (2005)	G3: Live in Tokyo (2005)	Terminal Velocity (2020)

G3 chronology
G3: Rockin' in the Free World (2003)	G3: Live in Tokyo (2005)

G3: Live in Tokyo

Video by Joe Satriani, Steve Vai & John Petrucci
- Released: 2005
- Recorded: May 8, 2005
- Genres: Instrumental rock, hard rock
- Label: Epic
- Producers: Joe Satriani; Steve Vai; John Petrucci

G3 chronology
G3: Live in Denver (2004)	G3: Live in Tokyo (2005)

G3: Live in Tokyo is a live album and DVD recorded at the Tokyo International Forum during the 2005 G3 tour, featuring Joe Satriani, Steve Vai, and John Petrucci.

== Critical reception ==
Professional ratings
Review scores
Source	Rating
Allmusic	4/5 stars

In his review for AllMusic, Rob Theakston praised the performances on ‘‘Live in Tokyo’’, highlighting the technical precision of John Petrucci’s playing, Steve Vai’s energetic rendition of “The Audience Is Listening” and the extended improvisational passages in “K’M-Pee-Du-Wee”. He noted that Joe Satriani’s three-song set showcased the diversity of his catalogue, culminating in an intense performance of “War”. Theakston also praised the closing three-song jam, featuring covers of ZZ Top’s “La Grange”, Jimi Hendrix’s “Foxey Lady” and Deep Purple’s “Smoke on the Water”. Although he considered the line-up less impressive than some previous G3 tours, he concluded that the album would appeal to guitar enthusiasts.

== Track listing ==
=== CD track listing ===
==== Disc 1 ====
===== John Petrucci =====
All songs written by John Petrucci

1. "Glasgow Kiss" - 9:18
2. "Damage Control" - 10:31

===== Steve Vai =====
All songs written by Steve Vai

3. "The Audience Is Listening" - 8:59
4. "Building the Church" - 6:09
5. "K'm-Pee-Du-Wee" - 9:16

==== Disc 2 ====
===== Joe Satriani =====
All songs written by Joe Satriani

1. "Up in Flames" - 8:56
2. "Searching" - 8:44
3. "War" - 6:37

===== The G3 Jam =====
4. "Foxy Lady" (Jimi Hendrix) - 10:43
  - The Jimi Hendrix Experience cover
5. "La Grange" (Billy Gibbons, Dusty Hill, Frank Beard) - 9:18
  - ZZ Top cover
6. "Smoke on the Water" (Ian Gillan, Ritchie Blackmore, Roger Glover, Jon Lord, Ian Paice) - 12:33
  - Deep Purple cover

=== DVD track listing ===
==== John Petrucci ====
1. "Glasgow Kiss"
2. "Damage Control"

==== Steve Vai ====
3. "The Audience Is Listening"
4. "Building the Church"
5. "K'm-Pee-Du-Wee"

==== Joe Satriani ====
6. "Up in Flames"
7. "Searching"
8. "War"

==== The G3 Jam ====
9. "Foxy Lady"
10. "La Grange"
11. "Smoke on the Water"

==== Extras ====
- G3 Soundcheck (15:01) with commentary by Joe Satriani, Steve Vai and John Petrucci.

== Personnel ==
=== Joe Satriani ===
- Joe Satriani - lead guitar
- Galen Henson - rhythm guitar
- Matt Bissonette - bass guitar
- Jeff Campitelli - drums

=== Steve Vai ===
- Steve Vai - lead guitar
- Dave Weiner - rhythm guitar
- Billy Sheehan - bass guitar
- Tony Macalpine - keyboards, guitar
- Jeremy Colson - drums

=== John Petrucci ===
- John Petrucci - guitar
- Dave LaRue - bass guitar
- Mike Portnoy - drums

=== The G3 Jam ===
- Joe Satriani - guitar, vocals on "Foxy Lady"
- Steve Vai - guitar
- John Petrucci - guitar
- Matt Bissonette - bass guitar, lead vocals on "Smoke on the Water"
- Billy Sheehan - bass guitar on "La Grange" and "Smoke on the Water", vocals on "La Grange", backing vocals on "Smoke on the Water"
- Mike Portnoy - drums on "Foxy Lady"
- Jeff Campitelli - drums on "La Grange" and "Smoke on the Water"

== Charts ==
=== Weekly charts ===
Chart performance for G3: Live in Tokyo
Chart (2005–06)	Peak position
Australian DVD (ARIA Charts)	38
Dutch Music DVD (MegaCharts)	21
Finnish Music DVD (Suomen virallinen lista)	4
New Zealand Music DVD (RMNZ)	2
Portuguese Music DVD (AFP)	12
Swedish Music DVD (Sverigetopplistan)	6
US Top Music Videos (Billboard)	2

== Certifications ==
Certifications for G3: Live in Tokyo
Region	Certification	Certified units/sales
Argentina (CAPIF)	Platinum	8,000^{^}
Australia (ARIA)	Platinum	15,000^{^}
New Zealand (RMNZ)	Platinum	5,000^{^}
^{^} Shipments figures based on certification alone.
