= Age of Nemesis =

Hungarian progressive metal band

- Also known as: Nemesis until 2005
- Origin: Vác, Hungary
- Genres: Progressive metal Progressive rock
- Years active: 1997 – 2005 (Nemesis); 2005 – present (Age of Nemesis)
- Labels: Magna Carta; Sensory (until 2005)
- Members: Zoltán Kiss; Zoltán Fábián; Gábor Krecsmarik; László Nagy; György Nagy
- Past members: Ákos Thorday; György Pethe; Mihály Szerecsen
- Website: www.ageofnemesis.com

Age of Nemesis is a Hungarian progressive metal band that formed in 1997 as Nemesis and later changed their name to Age of Nemesis in 2005. They are heavily influenced by Dream Theater and Symphony X. They released their albums in English and in Hungarian on different dates.

AllMusic noted about the band's 2006 studio album, Psychogeist, "Fans of metal/prog rock fusion will find a lot to enjoy about this pleasing, if derivative, effort."

== Discography ==
=== Discography as Age of Nemesis ===
- Nemesis (1998)
- Eden? (2002) (English)
- Psychogeist (2006) (English)
- Terra Incognita (2007) (English)

=== Discography as Nemesis ===
- Nemesis (1998) (Hungarian)
- Abraxas (1999) (Hungarian)
- Eden?
- For Promotional Use Only (2001) (Hungarian)
- Terra Incognita (2002) (Hungarian)
- Terra Incognita (2003) (English)
- For Promotional Use Only II (2005) (Hungarian)

== Band line-up ==
=== Current members ===
- Zoltán Kiss - Main vocals, rhythm guitars
- Zoltán Fábián - Guitars
- György Nagy - Keyboards
- György Tolmacsov - Bass
- Gábor Krecsmarik - Drums backing vocals

=== Former members ===
- Ákos Thorday - vocals (deceased)
- György Pethe - bass
- Mihály Szerecsen - drums
- Laszlo Nagy - drums
