= Boris Bukowski =

Austrian composer

Boris Bukowski (born 5 February 1946) is an Austrian musician, drummer and composer. He had several chart hits in the 1980s in continental Europe, above all in the German-dominant countries. He continues to play live to this day in the latter countries.

== Early life ==
Bukowski was born in Fürstenfeld, Styria, and grew up in Ilz near Graz, Austria. As a child on a family vacation in Croatia, then Yugoslavia, he saw a band drummer and developed a fascination for the instrument.

== Music career & Austro-Pop ==
He became a member of a number of smaller Styrian bands in the early 1960s. Playing the drums, he joined the band Magic 69, led by Günther Timischl (later the T in STS) in 1970, later renamed in Magic. In a similar vein as Mick Jagger, who studied at London School of Economics while playing on the Rolling Stones, Bukowski studied at university to secure a "respected" job opportunity. In contrast to Jagger, however, he finished his studies with a Dr. jur. in 1974 at the University of Graz but kept that aspect secret in pop circles. With Magic and FBI Band Bukowski was part of a "transformative era in Austrian music history" after WWII setbacks and a more stifling era in the 1950s.

After Magic disbanded in 1980, Bukowski started as a solo act. Writing his own music, he released three studio albums between 1985 and 1989, at which point he had several chart-peaking songs in Austria, including Kokain and Trag meine Liebe wie einen Mantel that did well in the German charts as well, which opened avenues for global cooperations.

In the late 1970s to the late 1990s, Bukowski ran a recording studio in Styria, where major tracks of Austro-Pop acts were recorded, including EAV, de:S.T.S. and others. He is part of the Graz-based Austro-Pop wave of the 1980s, collaborating with, among others, Thomas Spitzer and de:Schiffkowitz.

In the recording sessions in Munich for Bukowski's third studio album, 100 Stunden am Tag, Tony Levin played the signature bass lines in, among others, the song Fandango. His latest album release is from 2017, which he is touring with in Europe as of 2026, playing with current mainstream Austrian acts such as Wanda.

After a long break of 18 years, Bukowski released in 2017 his seventh studio album to great critical acclaim, being featured in a special broadcast by Austria's Ö1 cultural radio show Spielräume. In 2026, Bukowski's 80th birthday was celebrated by the same station with "Großes Interview", a big interview conducted by culture special reporter David Baldinger.

== Chart success ==
The single "Kokain" remained 6 weeks in the Austrian charts, peaking at 18 in 1988, only topped by "Trag Meine Liebe wie einen Mantel", peaking at rank 6 the following year.

Title	Year	Peak chart positions	Ref
Title	Year	(Austria)	Ref
"Kokain"	1988	18	
"Trag meine Liebe wie einen Mantel"	1989	6	
"Fandango"	1990	10	
"Ich bin müde"	1991	30	

Bukowski greatest commercial success has been the album "100 Stunden am Tag" from 1989 with the hit single "Trag meine Liebe wie einen Mantel" and the Top-10 Hit "Fandango".

== Discography ==
As solo artist, studio albums only:

- Boris Bukowski (1985)
- Intensiv (1987)
- 100 Stunden am Tag (1989)
- Ganz stark im Kommen (1991)
- Gott ist eine Frau (1993)
- 6 (1999)
- Gibt's ein Leben vor dem Tod? (2017)
