= The Road Less Traveled =

The Road Less Traveled, or simply Road Less Traveled, may refer to:

== Music ==
- The Road Less Traveled (George Strait album), 2001
- The Road Less Travelled (Graeme Connors album), 1996
- The Road Less Travelled (Preston Reed album), 1987
- The Road Less Traveled (Six Feet Deep album), 1997
- The Road Less Travelled (Triosphere album), 2010
- Greatest Hits: The Road Less Traveled, a 2005 album by Melissa Etheridge
- Road Less Traveled (Boyce Avenue album), 2016
- "Road Less Traveled" (song), a 2015 song by Lauren Alaina
- Road Less Traveled (Lauren Alaina album), 2017
- Road Less Traveled (Points North album), 2012
- "Road Less Traveled", song by Sick of It All from The Last Act of Defiance, 2014

== Other uses ==
- The Road Less Traveled, a 1978 popular book of psychology and spirituality by M. Scott Peck
- "The Road Less Traveled" (The Twilight Zone), a 1986 episode of the television series The Twilight Zone
- "The Road Less Traveled" (Battlestar Galactica), a 2008 episode of the television series Battlestar Galactica
- "The Road Less Traveled", a 2016 episode of the television series The Man in the High Castle

== See also ==
- "The Road Not Taken", a 1915 Robert Frost poem
- The Road We've Traveled, a 2012 documentary film about Barack Obama's presidency
