= Points North =

American rock band

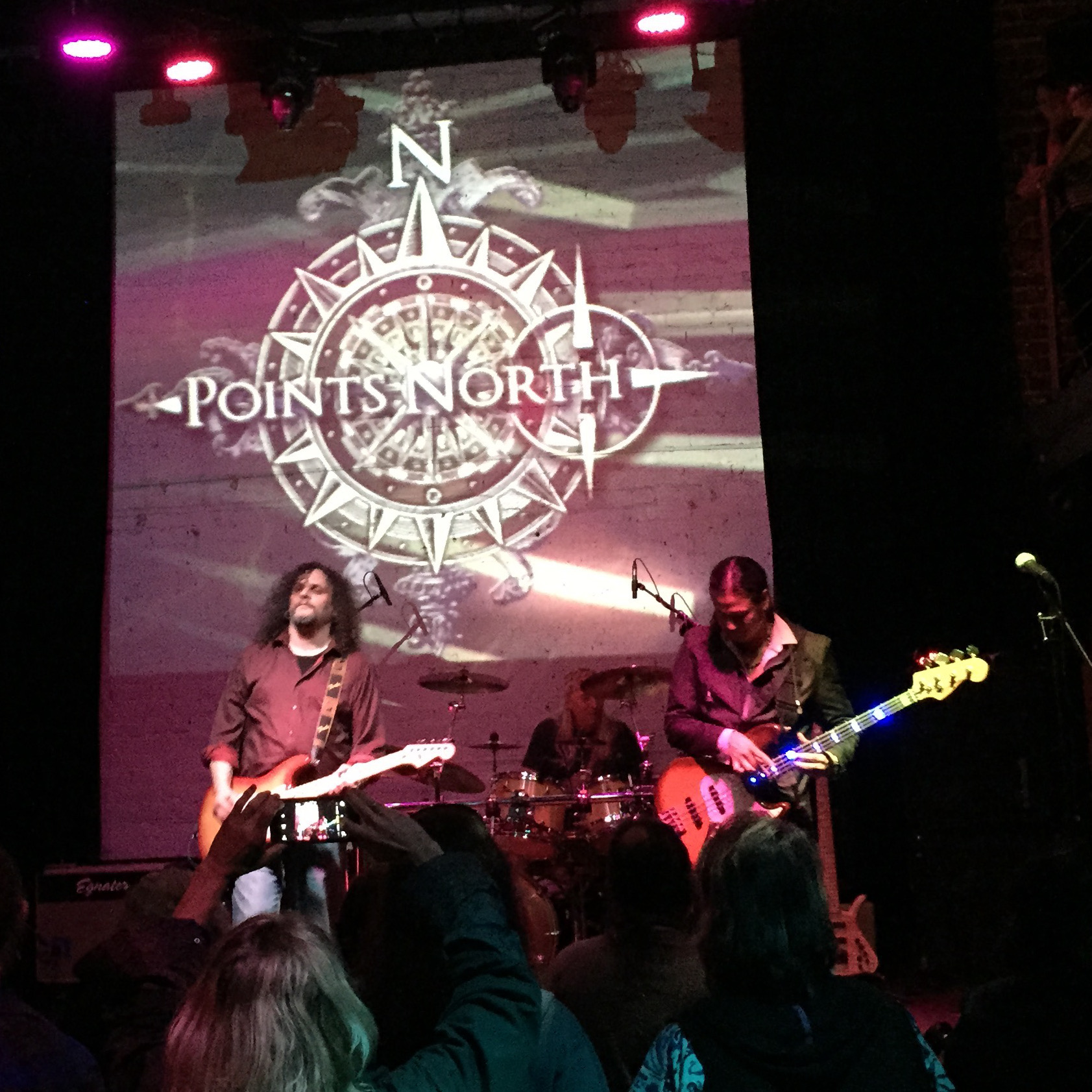
- The band (Eric Barnett, Kevin Aiello and Uriah Duffy) at The New Parish in Oakland, May 2015

Background information
- Genres: Progressive rock; instrumental rock
- Years active: 2008–present
- Label: Magna Carta
- Members: Eric Barnett; Uriah Duffy; Kevin Aiello
- Past members: Damien Sisson
- Website: pointsnorthband.com

Points North is a California-based rock band consisting of guitarist Eric Barnett, bassist Uriah Duffy and drummer Kevin Aiello. The band has released two studio albums and is known for its high-energy shows. The band also does gigs as their alter ego Fred Barchetta in tribute to the band Rush adding Darby Gould (formerly of Jefferson Starship) on vocals.

== Band members ==
Barnett was a finalist in the 2008 Guitar Superstar competition. He has also contributed tips to instrumental guitarists in Guitar Player magazine and has contributed music to video games. Duffy may be best known for being a member of Whitesnake between 2006 and 2010. He joined Points North shortly after their first CD was released.

== Discography ==
- Road Less Traveled (2012)
- Points North (2015)
