= Suspended Animation (John Petrucci album) =

Studio album by John Petrucci
- Released: March 1, 2005
- Studio: Little Bear Studios, Suffern, New York; Sound on Sound Studios, New York City
- Genre: Instrumental rock, progressive metal
- Length: 61:31
- Label: Sound Mind
- Producer: John Petrucci

John Petrucci chronology
An Evening with John Petrucci and Jordan Rudess (2000)	Suspended Animation (2005)	G3: Live in Tokyo (2005)

Suspended Animation is the first studio album by Dream Theater guitarist John Petrucci, released independently in 2005 through Sound Mind Music. The songs "Jaws of Life", "Glasgow Kiss" and "Damage Control" have been played during the G3 tour, and the latter two are featured as openers to the 2005 DVD and live album G3: Live in Tokyo. Some releases of the album have "Curve" split into two separate tracks, with the majority of the song on track six and the latter portion on track seven. On these editions, "Lost Without You" and "Animate-Inanimate" form tracks eight and nine respectively. The correct track listing, without the aforementioned anomalies, is shown below.

== Critical reception ==
Professional ratings
Review scores
Source	Rating
All About Jazz	3/5 stars

Mark Sabbatini at All About Jazz gave Suspended Animation a mixed review, initially criticizing some songs as sounding like "what feels like a market-driven formula for success." He nonetheless noted "Animate-Inanimate" as a highlight, while praising Petrucci's guitar tone, which he described as "clear and distinct even during moments of high-speed indulgence" and setting him apart from his contemporaries.

== Track listing ==
All music is composed by John Petrucci.

No.	Title	Length
1.	"Jaws of Life"	7:29
2.	"Glasgow Kiss"	7:48
3.	"Tunnel Vision"	6:35
4.	"Wishful Thinking"	7:28
5.	"Damage Control"	9:15
6.	"Curve"	6:22
7.	"Lost Without You"	4:56
8.	"Animate-Inanimate"	11:38
Total length:		61:31

== Personnel ==
- John Petrucci – guitar, production
- Dave DiCenso – drums (except track 3)
- Tony Verderosa – drums (track 3), remixing
- Dave LaRue – bass (except track 3)
- Tim Lefebvre – bass (track 3)
- Doug Oberkircher – engineering
- Steve Hardy – engineering
- Kevin Shirley – mixing
- Howie Weinberg – mastering
