= Jon Finn =

American musician and guitarist

Jonathan M. Finn (born 1958) is an American rock musician and guitarist. He is the founder and leader of the Jon Finn Group, and is a professor at the Berklee College of Music; he joined the guitar faculty there in 1988. He is also the author of several books on the guitar, and was an instructional columnist for Guitar magazine for three years.

Finn grew up in Westwood, Massachusetts, and began playing guitar at the age of six. He later became a student at Berklee. When he was 14 years old he played with the group Cheap Thrills, which consisted of Finn, Steve Carro (Vocals), Bob Shain (Keyboard), Ron Dupres (Bass), Joel Sklar (Rhythm Guitar), and Greg Buckingham (Drums).

He has been a guest performer with the Boston Pops, recording several albums with them, including the Grammy-nominated The Celtic Album (1997) and The Latin Album (1999). He has also performed with John Petrucci of Dream Theater, Carl Verheyen, Vinnie Moore, Andy Timmons, Steve Morse of the Dixie Dregs, New York Voices, Collin Raye, Dweezil Zappa, and Debbie Reynolds, among others. In addition he has toured with musical theater productions such as Rent, Mamma Mia!, Aida, Joseph and the Amazing Technicolor Dreamcoat and Copacabana. In his 1999 publication, Advanced Modern Rock Guitar Improvisation, Finn introduced the warp refraction principle.

In 1997, Finn was listed as #30 in the Westwood One Hundred publication's List of Top 100 notable people and places in Westwood.

Warp refraction is a term coined by Finn in his 1999 publication, Advanced Modern Rock Guitar Improvisation, to describe the single major third string interval in standard guitar tuning.

== Discography ==
- Don't Look So Serious (Legato Records, 1994)
- Wicked (SEP Records, 1998)
- Bull in a China Shop (SEP Music, 2010)

== Books ==
- Advanced Modern Rock Guitar Improvisation (1999, Mel Bay Publications, Inc., ISBN 0-7866-6866-0)
- One Guitar Many Styles (2003, Mel Bay Publications, Inc., ISBN 0-7866-6748-6)
- Blues/Rock Improv Book (2004, Mel Bay Publications, Inc., ISBN 0-7866-7208-0)
- Guitar Riffs in the Style of 60s and 70s (2007, Mel Bay Publications, Inc., ISBN 978-0-7866-7470-1)
