= Liquid Tension Experiment 2 =

Studio album by Liquid Tension Experiment
- Released: June 15, 1999
- Recorded: October 11 – November 29, 1998
- Studio: Millbrook Sound Studios in Millbrook, New York
- Genre: Instrumental rock, progressive metal, jazz fusion
- Length: 73:55
- Label: Magna Carta
- Producer: Liquid Tension Experiment

Liquid Tension Experiment chronology
| Liquid Tension Experiment (1998) | Liquid Tension Experiment 2 (1999) | Spontaneous Combustion (2007) |

Professional ratings
Review scores
| Source | Rating |
|---|---|
| All About Jazz | (favorable) |
| AllMusic | 3/5 stars |
| Collector's Guide to Heavy Metal | 6/10 |

Liquid Tension Experiment 2 is the second studio album by the band Liquid Tension Experiment, released on June 15, 1999 through Magna Carta Records. The album reached No. 8 on the Billboard Top Internet Albums chart and No. 40 on Billboard's Heatseekers. It would take the band another 22 years before they would release their third album.

== Overview ==
Each song is described by the band in detail within the liner notes. Bassist Tony Levin almost exclusively used a Chapman Stick to record the album's bass parts. The only bass guitar parts on the album occur briefly in "Another Dimension" and the intro to "Biaxident". The latter song takes its name from Biaxin, a medication that guitarist John Petrucci was taking during the recording sessions to combat severe headaches, making a pun on "by accident".

In the middle of the recording sessions, which took place between October and November 1998, Petrucci had to leave the studio when he got word that his pregnant wife had gone into labor. This left the other three band members to carry on recording by themselves. This is how "When the Water Breaks" got its name, as it was the song the band were working on when Petrucci got the news. The song contains a baby sound effect (a "baby soundscape", as described by keyboardist Jordan Rudess) at 12:48 to mark the particular section the band had been writing upon Petrucci's departure.

In Petrucci's absence Levin, Rudess and drummer Mike Portnoy recorded dozens of completely improvised jams, many of which would eventually be released on the 2007 album Spontaneous Combustion under the group name Liquid Trio Experiment. As such, "914" is the only song on the album which did not feature Petrucci. Portnoy alluded to the jams in the liner notes, stating that "if you dig this, there is A LOT more where it came from..."

When Petrucci returned to the studio in November, he wrote and recorded guitar parts for two of these improvisations: "Chewbacca" and "Liquid Dreams". For "Chewbacca" in particular, he took the time to learn several of Rudess's improvised melodies and doubled them on guitar, which in Portnoy's words "(gave) the illusion of written composition".

"Hourglass" is a duet between Petrucci and Rudess in the style of "State of Grace" from the band's first album. According to Petrucci it was written and recorded "in the wee hours with old strings".

"Acid Rain", the album's opening track, was the last song to be written and recorded by the whole band. For this song Petrucci used a seven-string guitar. A heavily shortened live version later appeared on Dream Theater's 2001 album Live Scenes from New York, with the bass part played by John Myung on a six-string bass.

Shortly after Liquid Tension Experiment 2 was released, Rudess joined Dream Theater as a full-time member.

== Track listing ==
All music is composed by Liquid Tension Experiment.

| No. | Title | Length |
|---|---|---|
| 1. | "Acid Rain" | 6:36 |
| 2. | "Biaxident" | 7:41 |
| 3. | "914" | 4:01 |
| 4. | "Another Dimension" | 9:50 |
| 5. | "When the Water Breaks" | 16:57 |
| 6. | "Chewbacca" | 13:35 |
| 7. | "Liquid Dreams" | 10:50 |
| 8. | "Hourglass" | 4:25 |
| Total length: | | 73:55 |

== Personnel ==
- John Petrucci – guitar, producer
- Tony Levin – Chapman Stick, bass guitar, producer
- Jordan Rudess – keyboard, producer
- Mike Portnoy – drums, percussion, producer
- Chris Cubeta – engineering
- Pat Thrall – engineering
- Spyros Poulos – engineering
- Kosaku Nakamura – engineering
- Kevin Shirley – mixing
- Rich Alvy – mixing assistance
- Leon Zervos – mastering

== Charts ==
| Year | Chart | Position |
|---|---|---|
| 1999 | Billboard Top Internet Albums | 8 |
| 1999 | Billboard Heatseekers | 40 |
