= World Diary =

Studio album by Tony Levin
- Released: 1995
- Genre: Progressive rock, World music
- Length: 57:00
- Label: Papa Bear Records

Tony Levin chronology
World Diary (1995)	Waters of Eden (2000)

Professional ratings
Review scores
Source	Rating
AllMusic	4/5 stars

World Diary is the debut solo album by American bass guitarist Tony Levin. Recorded largely with portable digital devices in casual settings like hotel rooms or apartments as Levin toured the world in Peter Gabriel's band, the album is mostly a series of duets or trios.

== Track listing ==
All songs composed by Levin and his respective collaborators

1. "Chasms" (5:21)
2. "The Train" (4:44)
3. "We Stand in Sapphire Silence" (5:45)
4. "Smoke (0:49)
5. "Etude in the Key of Guildford" (3:13)
6. "Espresso & the Bed of Nails" (4:46)
7. "Mingled Roots" (3:49)
8. "Nyatiti" (4:19)
9. "Jewels" (3:48)
10. "La Tristesse Amoureuse de la Nuit" (4:58)
11. "Heat" (6:33)
12. "I Cry to the Dolphined Sea" (5:41)
13. "The Sound of Goodbye" (3:14)

== Personnel ==
- Tony Levin: bass guitar, Chapman stick and electric upright bass (all songs); espresso machine sample (6)
- L. Shankar: electric violin and vocals (1)
- Ayub Ogada: nyatiti and vocals, (2, 8)
- Tchad Blake: train sample (2)
- Brian Yamakoshi: koto (3, 13)
- Jerry Marotta: drums (3, 12)
- Bendik: saxophones (4, 12)
- Bill Bruford: electronic drums (5, 9)
- Nexus: percussion: (6, 11)
- Levon Minassian: doudouk (7, 10)
- Manu Katche: drums (10)
