= John Petrucci =

American guitarist (born 1967)

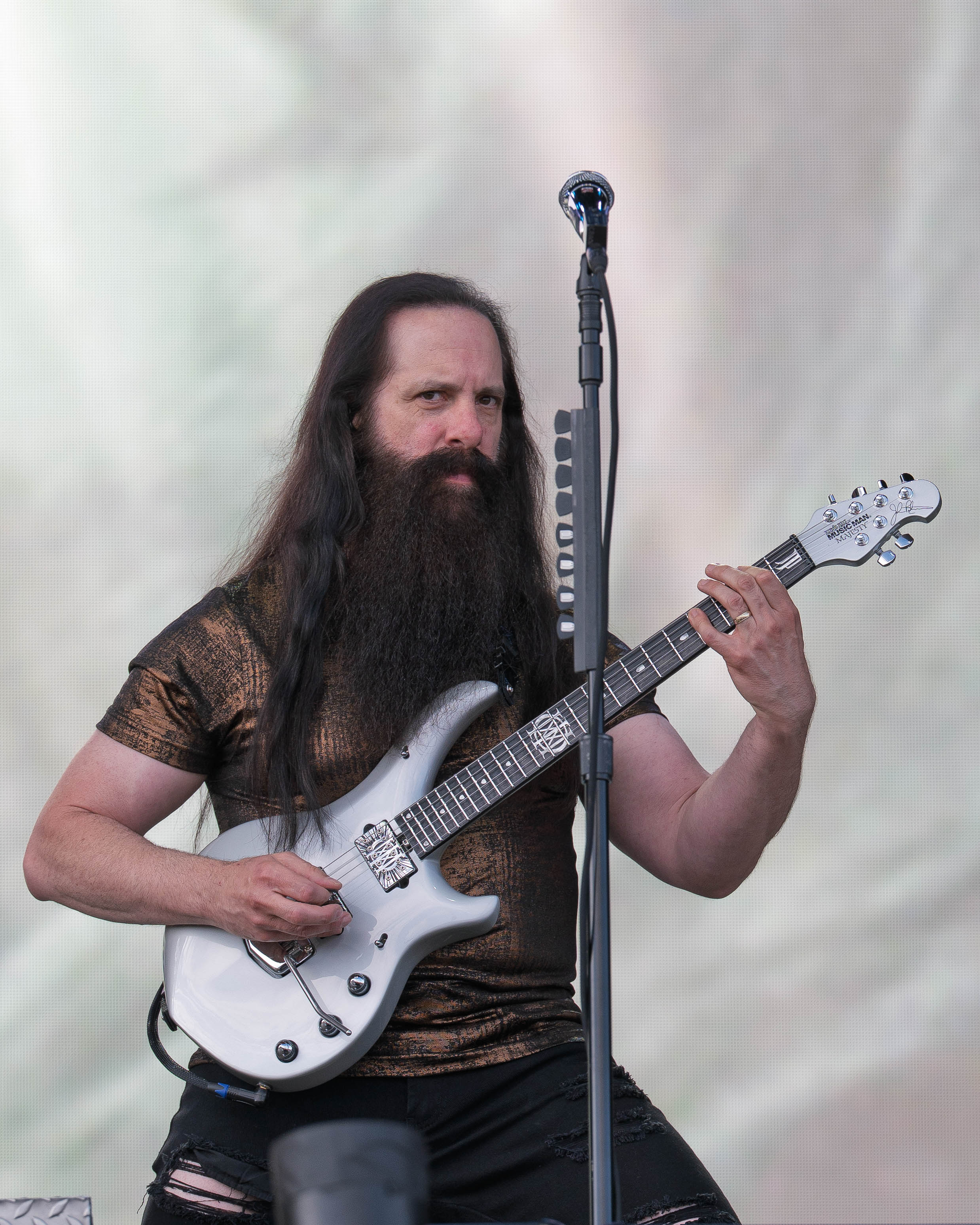
- Petrucci performing in 2025

Background information
- Born: John Peter Petrucci; July 12, 1967 (age 59); Kings Park, New York, U.S.
- Genres: Progressive metal; heavy metal; progressive rock; instrumental rock
- Occupations: Musician; songwriter; producer
- Instrument: Guitar
- Years active: 1984–present
- Labels: Roadrunner; Sound Mind Music; Magna Carta
- Member of: Dream Theater; Liquid Tension Experiment
- Formerly of: Explorers Club
- Website: johnpetrucci.com

John Peter Petrucci (born July 12, 1967) is an American guitarist and a founding member of the progressive metal band Dream Theater. He produced all of Dream Theater's albums from Metropolis Pt. 2: Scenes from a Memory (1999), often co-producing alongside drummer Mike Portnoy before Portnoy's departure between 2010 and 2023, and has been the sole producer since A Dramatic Turn of Events (2011). Petrucci has also released two solo albums: Suspended Animation (2005) and Terminal Velocity (2020).

== Early life and influences ==
John Peter Petrucci was born on July 12, 1967, in Kings Park, New York, to an Italian American family. He picked up the guitar at around the age of eight because his older sister was allowed to go to bed later to practice the organ. However, he decided to quit the guitar when his attempts to stay up late were unsuccessful. He picked up the guitar again at the age of 12. He became addicted and consumed when he discovered guitar as his passion, committing to practicing guitar six hours a day. At the suggestion of a high school teacher, he began practicing using a metronome, which he has said is the greatest piece of musical advice he ever received. He would also go from house to house having jam sessions with very many different local musicians, an experience which helped him develop immensely as a guitar player. His early influences were bands like Led Zeppelin, Black Sabbath, AC/DC, and later developed an interest in progressive rock and heavy metal, exemplified by Rush, Yes, Iron Maiden, Dixie Dregs and Metallica. His other influences as a guitarist include Jimmy Page, Brian May, Eddie Van Halen, Yngwie Malmsteen, Allan Holdsworth, Alex Lifeson, Randy Rhoads, Mike Stern, Joe Satriani, Stevie Ray Vaughan and David Gilmour.

== Career ==
Eventually, his childhood friend and future Dream Theater keyboardist Kevin Moore invited Petrucci to join his cover band. Petrucci attended Berklee College of Music in Boston with childhood friend John Myung (bass), where they met future bandmate Mike Portnoy (drums). While in Berklee they often covered two of their biggest influences, Iron Maiden and Rush. These three, in addition to Kevin Moore, formed the band Majesty. Because there was already another band with the same name, the group later became Dream Theater.

While Petrucci is most commonly associated with Dream Theater, he is also in the project band Liquid Tension Experiment, and has appeared as a guest on records by other artists, such as the Age of Impact album by the Explorer's Club.

Petrucci has released a guitar instructional video, Rock Discipline, which covers warm-up exercises, exercises to avoid injury while playing, alternate picking, sweep picking, chords and other techniques for developing one's guitar playing. Petrucci also has a book named "Guitar World presents John Petrucci's Wild Stringdom", which was compiled from columns he wrote for Guitar World magazine under that title.

In 2001, Joe Satriani and Steve Vai invited Petrucci to tour with them on the popular G3 guitar tour, which exposed him to a massive number of new fans and inspired a solo album. The album, Suspended Animation, was released on March 1, 2005, and was available for order from his web site. Petrucci also appeared on the 2005 and 2006 G3 tours, and in 2007, went on G3 tour again, this time with Paul Gilbert and Joe Satriani. In a video with Larry DiMarzio, Petrucci announced that he is working on a follow-up to his 2005 album, Suspended Animation and a new Dream Theater album.

Petrucci also wrote and recorded two instrumental soundtrack songs for a Sega Saturn game titled Digital Pinball: Necronomicon. Each track is roughly two minutes long, and are named simply Prologue and Epilogue. In a spoof rock band, Nightmare Cinema (which was the Dream Theater members changing instruments for encores), he used the "alternate stage name" Johnny James.

In 2012, Petrucci was invited once again to join Joe Satriani on the G3 tour, along with Steve Morse. He was accompanied by bassist Dave LaRue and drummer and Dream Theater bandmate Mike Mangini.

In 2018, Petrucci joined Joe Satriani on the G3 tour. They were accompanied by Uli Jon Roth on the European leg of the tour, and Phil Collen in North America. His second solo album, titled Terminal Velocity was released in 2020. Petrucci's first solo album in 15 years, it reunited him with Mike Portnoy for the first time since Portnoy left Dream Theater in 2010.

== Musical style ==
=== Guitar technique ===
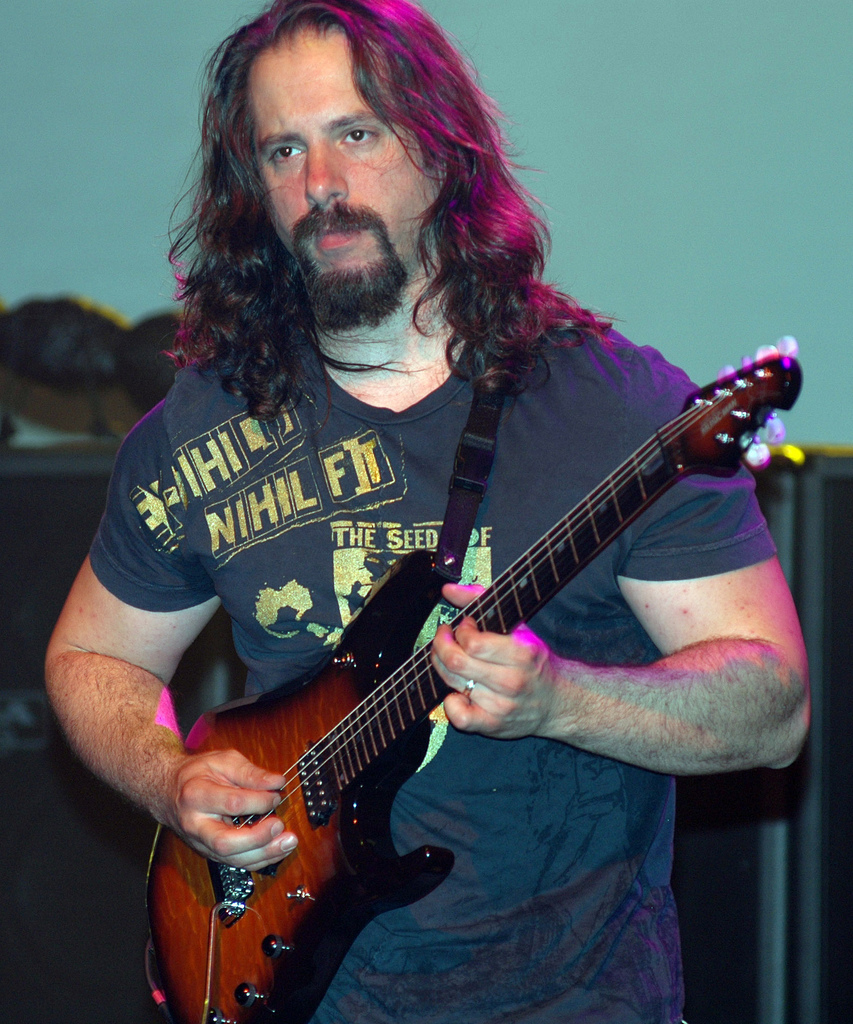
Petrucci in 2007

Petrucci is respected for his variety of guitar styles and skills. One of the most notable of these is his high-speed alternate picking which, as he himself claims, requires a "strong sense of synchronization between the two [playing] hands." He is notable for frequent use of the seven-string electric guitar, which he says he uses as a writing tool, taking advantage of the extended range for heavier riffing and to play extended range runs as part of a solo. Moreover, Petrucci often combines his metal shredding technique with a slower, emotive soloing style.

=== Lyrics ===
Petrucci is Dream Theater's most prolific lyricist, with each album including at least three songs featuring his lyrics. Some of Petrucci's notable songs include "Metropolis, Pt. 1: The Miracle and the Sleeper", "The Spirit Carries On", "The Great Debate", "In the Presence of Enemies", and "Through Her Eyes". Petrucci has occasionally used real-life experiences for lyrical inspiration, as heard in songs such as "The Count of Tuscany", "A Nightmare to Remember" and "Endless Sacrifice".

=== Singing ===
Petrucci has acted as a backing vocalist live since the Awake Tour. He is a baritone, producing a sound darker than that of James LaBrie's tenor voice. He has also written vocal melodies for Dream Theater. Petrucci's role as a vocalist expanded following the departure of Mike Portnoy, who had been Dream Theater's primary backing vocalist and occasionally even shared lead vocals with LaBrie. In live performances, Petrucci replicated some vocal parts originally sung by Portnoy, with others being recorded samples.

== Accolades and praise ==
Regarded as "one of the most celebrated guitarists alive" by Premier Guitar, Petrucci has performed as the third guitarist on the G3 tour seven times, more than any other invited guitarist. In their article "John Petrucci: The Ultimate Evolved Guitarist", Premier Guitar calls Petrucci "one of the best who's ever laid a hand on a fretboard". He was voted "Best Prog guitarist" by The Prog Magazine and the "Greatest Guitarist" by Burrn magazine and Mariskalrock. Guitar World magazine lists Petrucci among the "Fastest Guitarists of All Time" and calls him "the most celebrated and popular guitarist in the world of progressive metal" and "arguably the most versatile and proficient player in his realm, with a highly developed melodic sense and an alternate picking technique that is virtually untouchable as far as speed and precision", while also ranking him among the top 5 "Best Guitarists of the Decade".

In 2019, Petrucci won the SENA Performers European Award. Joel McIver's 2009 book The 100 Greatest Metal Guitarists ranks Petrucci second, after Dave Mustaine. He was also named as one of the "Top 10 Greatest Guitar Shredders of All Time" by GuitarOne magazine. In 2012, Petrucci was ranked the 17th greatest guitarist of all time by a Guitar World magazine reader's poll. According to Forbes, the Ernie Ball-Music Man John Petrucci JP6 is the second-best-selling signature model of all time, behind only the Gibson Les Paul.

== Equipment ==
Petrucci is a long-time user of Music Man JP and Majesty series guitars and Mesa/Boogie amplifiers. While his pedalboard, controller, effects and overdrives have undergone changes over the years, the core of Petrucci's guitar sound remains DiMarzio pickups and Mesa/Boogie amplifiers. Most recently the signature JP-2C amplifier based on the Mark IIC+ series and other Mark and Rectifier series amplifiers, such as during the recording of Train of Thought.

A number of brands have released signature guitar equipment designed or endorsed by Petrucci:

- Ibanez released the first John Petrucci signature guitars, made from 1995 to 1999
- DiMarzio have produced several pickups designed in collaboration with Petrucci, and released a signature guitar strap bearing his emblem.
- Ernie Ball Music Man (USA) began producing John Petrucci signature guitars in 2001 and have made numerous models bearing his name since.
- Dunlop produce John Petrucci signature guitar picks including the Jazz III and flow
- TC Electronic released the Dreamscape John Petrucci signature modulation pedal in 2013.

At the beginning of 2016, two new releases were announced: the Dunlop John Petrucci signature Cry-Baby wah, and the Mesa/Boogie JP-2C John Petrucci head. The latter is a three-channel amplifier, which is available both as a stand-alone amp head and as a rack-mounted amp head. It differs from other Mesa/Boogie Mark series amps in that it features two separate graphic EQs, an exclusive "Shred" circuit, midi connection and CabClone direct out, resulting in increased versatility.

== Personal life ==
Petrucci lives in St. James, New York, with his wife Rena Sands, a guitarist in the all-female heavy metal band Meanstreak; they have three children. Sands is the aunt of Jake Bowen, a guitarist in the progressive metal band Periphery.

Petrucci is a fan of bodybuilding and dedicates much of his off time to weight training. He is a voting member of The Recording Academy.

Dream Theater bandmate Jordan Rudess revealed in an interview that Petrucci is a practicing Catholic. Petrucci also spoke about his faith in a Dream Theater Q&A with DreamTheaterForums and in an interview with Mark Small from Berklee Today magazine.

== Discography ==
=== Solo albums ===
- Suspended Animation (2005)
- Terminal Velocity (2020)

=== With Liquid Tension Experiment ===
- Liquid Tension Experiment (1998)
- Liquid Tension Experiment 2 (1999)
- Liquid Tension Experiment 3 (2021)

=== With G3 ===
- G3: Live in Tokyo (With guitarists Steve Vai and Joe Satriani) (2005)

=== With Jordan Rudess ===
- An Evening with John Petrucci and Jordan Rudess (2000)

=== As a guest ===
- Digital Pinball: Necronomicon soundtrack (1996)
- Explorers Club – Age of Impact (1998)
- Jon Finn Group – Wicked (1998)
- Jordan Rudess – Feeding the Wheel (2001)
- Derek Sherinian – Blood of the Snake (Played on track "Czar Of Steel") (2006)
- Marty Friedman – Loudspeaker (Special guest guitarist on "Black Orchid") (2006)
- Periphery – Periphery II: This Time It's Personal (Guest solo on track "Erised") (2012)
- Sterling Ball, John Ferraro and Jim Cox – The Mutual Admiration Society (2018)
- Jordan Rudess – Wired for Madness (2019)
- Bryan Beller – Scenes from the Flood (Solo on "World Class") (2019)
- Saab Guitar Project – Space Traveller (2021)
- Joscho Stephan – Take-Off (gypsy jazz guitar on the title track) (2025)

=== Others ===
- Working Man – A Tribute to Rush – Various Artists (A tribute to Rush) (1996)
- Dragon Attack – Various Artists (A tribute to Queen) (1997)
- Guitar Battle – Various Artists (1998)
- Super Mario Bros. Theme Remix – FamilyJules (2018)

== Videography ==
Year	Title	Notes
1993	Images and Words: Live in Tokyo	First Dream Theater live DVD. Includes extended version of "Take the Time."
1995	Rock Discipline – VHS	John Petrucci does a DVD on guitar warmups, tricks, exercises, and his gear.
1998	5 Years in a LIVEtime	The only live Dream Theater DVD with Derek Sherinian.
2001	Metropolis 2000: Scenes From New York
2002	Rock Discipline – DVD
2004	Live at Budokan
2005	G3: Live in Tokyo
2006	Score	2DVD's recorded at Radio City Music Hall on April 1, 2006, New York, US Celebrating Dream Theater's 20th Anniversary. They performed this concert with a symphony orchestra.
2007	Chaos in Progress: The Making of Systematic Chaos	DVD included in the special edition of Systematic Chaos
2008	Chaos in Motion 2007–2008	Released September 30, 2008. Documents the band's 2007/2008 Chaos in Motion and Progressive Nation tours.
2013	Live at Luna Park
2014	Breaking the Fourth Wall	2DVD's recorded live at the Boston Opera House on March 25, 2014, released on September 29, 2014, on CD, DVD, and Blu-ray.
2020	Distant Memories – Live in London	Recorded on February 21 and 22, 2020.
