= Liquid Tension Experiment (album) =

Studio album by Liquid Tension Experiment
- Released: March 10, 1998
- Recorded: September 20–25, 1997
- Studio: Millbrook Sound Studios, Millbrook, New York
- Genre: Instrumental rock, progressive metal
- Length: 73:55
- Label: Magna Carta
- Producer: Liquid Tension Experiment

Liquid Tension Experiment chronology
Liquid Tension Experiment (1998)	Liquid Tension Experiment 2 (1999)

Professional ratings
Review scores
Source	Rating
AllMusic	3/5 stars
Collector's Guide to Heavy Metal	6/10

Liquid Tension Experiment is the self-titled first studio album by the band Liquid Tension Experiment, released on March 10, 1998, through Magna Carta Records. The band featured guitarist John Petrucci and drummer Mike Portnoy, at the time both of Dream Theater; bassist Tony Levin; and keyboardist Jordan Rudess, who would go on to join Dream Theater in 1999.

== Background ==
"Chris and Kevin's Excellent Adventure" is a reference to the album's photo sessions, where the photographer misnamed Portnoy and Levin as "Chris" and "Kevin". "Three Minute Warning", a single song which is split into five tracks, references an incident in the studio where Levin became frustrated with the band's insistence on composing songs instead of improvising jams. The album's back cover includes a humorous disclaimer on tracks 9 to 13:

Caution: "Three Minute Warning" is not for the musically faint-hearted, impatient, or critics of extreme self-indulgence. If you fall into any of the above categories, please hit the stop button on your CD player after track #8.

== Track listing ==
All music is composed by Liquid Tension Experiment.

No.	Title	Length
1.	"Paradigm Shift"	8:55
2.	"Osmosis"	3:26
3.	"Kindred Spirits"	6:29
4.	"The Stretch"	2:00
5.	"Freedom of Speech"	9:19
6.	"Chris and Kevin's Excellent Adventure"	2:21
7.	"State of Grace"	5:01
8.	"Universal Mind"	7:53
9.	"Three Minute Warning" (part 1)	8:20
10.	"Three Minute Warning" (part 2)	4:02
11.	"Three Minute Warning" (part 3)	5:18
12.	"Three Minute Warning" (part 4)	4:20
13.	"Three Minute Warning" (part 5)	6:31
Total length:		73:55

== Personnel ==
- John Petrucci – guitar, production
- Tony Levin – Chapman Stick, bass guitar, electric upright bass, production
- Jordan Rudess – keyboard, production
- Mike Portnoy – drums, production
- Paul Orofino – engineering
- Kosaku Nakamura – engineering assistance
- Kevin Shirley – mixing
- Rich Alvy – mixing assistance
- Leon Zervos – mastering
