= Liquid Tension Experiment =

American progressive metal supergroup

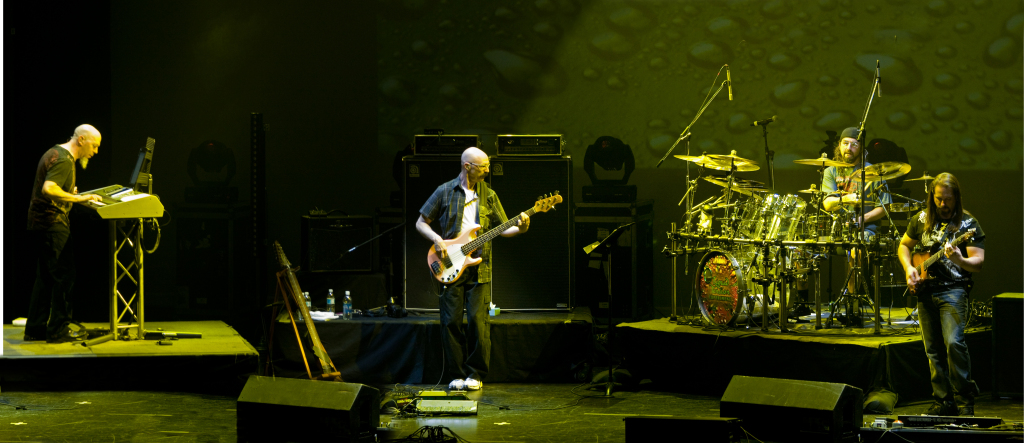
- Liquid Tension Experiment onstage at Nearfest 2008. Bethlehem, PA.. From left: Jordan Rudess, Tony Levin, Mike Portnoy, John Petrucci.

Background information
- Origin: New York City, United States
- Genres: Progressive metal, progressive rock, instrumental rock, jazz fusion
- Years active: 1997–1999, 2008, 2020–present
- Labels: Magna Carta, Lazy Tomato, Inside Out Music
- Spinoff of: Dream Theater
- Members: John Petrucci; Jordan Rudess; Mike Portnoy; Tony Levin

Liquid Tension Experiment (LTE) is an American instrumental progressive metal supergroup founded by Mike Portnoy in 1997. The band initially released two albums, between 1998 and 1999. An extension of their second regular album, with the absence of John Petrucci, was released in 2007 under the name "Liquid Trio Experiment".

Active up until 1999, when Jordan Rudess formally joined Dream Theater, the band reunited in 2008 for a series of live shows. A live album with the absence of Jordan Rudess (mostly) was released in 2009 under the name "Liquid Trio Experiment 2", as were three live albums and two videos featuring the complete band. They regrouped once again in 2020 to record a third studio album featuring all band members, which was released on April 16, 2021.

== History ==
=== Formation, studio albums and tours ===
Liquid Tension Experiment was formed by Dream Theater drummer Mike Portnoy after Magna Carta gave him the green light for "whatever he wanted to do". Portnoy first invited keyboardist Jordan Rudess and progressive rock icon Tony Levin (bass, Chapman Stick) of King Crimson and Peter Gabriel's band to join him. Portnoy also had bassist Billy Sheehan and keyboardist Jens Johansson on his shortlist.

In his second instructional video "Liquid Drum Theater", Portnoy said that his first choice for the guitar was Dimebag Darrell, but he was unable to join because of conflicting schedules. Two other primary choices, Steve Morse (formerly of Dixie Dregs and Kansas, at that time of Deep Purple) and Jim Matheos (Fates Warning) were also unavailable. Portnoy then turned to fellow Dream Theater member John Petrucci to fill the position (despite initially wanting to keep the project completely separate from Dream Theater). The combo was formed as a side project to Dream Theater in 1997. Both Mike and John confirmed on the 5 Years in a Livetime DVD commentary that Rudess was asked to join Dream Theater largely because of the success of Liquid Tension Experiment, and the chemistry of the three working together. Rudess had previously declined to join Dream Theater in 1994 and instead became a member of the Dixie Dregs, known for complex, "Southern fusion" instrumental music.

Liquid Tension Experiment released two albums, Liquid Tension Experiment (1998) and Liquid Tension Experiment 2 (1999), on Magna Carta Records. They also played a few live shows in New York, Philadelphia, Los Angeles and London. Mike Portnoy had stated in numerous interviews (and on his web site FAQ) that there would not be a third LTE album, as three of the four band members were also part of Dream Theater and the material would be too similar. In 2007, however, he said that a third release is possible, but that his problems with the Magna Carta label are more of an obstacle than getting the band members together to record.

In particular there were problems with the company that released the Liquid Drum Theater VHS tape using video footage of Liquid Tension Experiment in the studio without getting the required permission of Magna Carta. Mike Portnoy came back to Magna Carta in 2007 to release Liquid Trio Experiment's "Spontaneous Combustion" sessions.

Several songs and riffs from the project have been incorporated into Dream Theater's live performances, such as "Instrumedley" from Live at Budokan, which includes excerpts of the songs "Paradigm Shift" and "Universal Mind."

On October 4, 2007, it was announced that LTE would headline NEARfest 2008 in June. On March 29, 2008, six Liquid Tension Experiment tour dates in June 2008 were announced to celebrate the band's ten-year anniversary as well to create a "whole new musical experiment".

Liquid Tension Experiment released a multi-disc boxed set of tour highlights from their 2008 tour, including complete shows from New York and Los Angeles, on DVD and CD (the L.A. show also on Blu-ray), the Liquid Trio Experiment 2 recording from Chicago (q.v. below), and a disc of improvisations from other shows on the tour. The New York and Los Angeles shows were also released separately on CD or DVD, all through Dream Theater's official bootlegs website, YtseJam Records' subsidiary, Lazy Tomato Entertainment.

=== Liquid Trio Experiment ===
During the recording sessions for their second album, John Petrucci had to leave when his wife went into premature labor. During that period, the remaining members, who still had studio time booked, continued to write music in improvisation. On October 23, 2007, a compilation of jams from those sessions was released under the name of Liquid Trio Experiment. The album, called Spontaneous Combustion, was recorded from Mike Portnoy's DATs of the sessions because the original master tapes disappeared before the mixing stage. A few songs from Liquid Tension Experiment 2 were spawned from these jam sessions, including "914", "Chewbacca", and "Liquid Dreams".

=== Liquid Trio Experiment 2 ===
The second incarnation of Liquid Trio Experiment happened unexpectedly while playing a concert in Chicago, IL on June 25, 2008. In the beginning of their set, Jordan Rudess' keyboard started playing two adjacent notes on every press of a key. At the end of playing "Universal Mind", he went off stage to talk to the tech crew to see if it could be fixed. In the meantime, the other three musicians on stage continued to play, improvising for what turned out to be the rest of the concert. Rudess was on the phone with Roland for most of the time, and finally realized the keyboard was unfixable in that time, so he came onstage and took Petrucci's guitar to jam with the band. Petrucci took Levin's bass, and Levin joined in on Chapman Stick. Toward the end of the show, Charlie Benante from the band Anthrax came and played drums while Portnoy played bass. This entire improvised concert was released in 2009 as When the Keyboard Breaks: Live in Chicago.

=== Interim period ===
On July 19, 2012, at Dream Theater's second show on Huntington NY, Tony Levin joined Petrucci, Rudess and Mike Mangini (Dream Theater's drummer at the time) onstage to perform "Paradigm Shift."

Later in 2012, Portnoy performed "Acid Rain" live with PSMS, his band with Derek Sherinian, Tony MacAlpine and Billy Sheehan. They recorded a live DVD in Tokyo including the song.

On February 10, 2017, Mike Portnoy and Tony Levin reunited on stage in Tampa, FL to perform Paradigm Shift, Acid Rain and Universal Mind. They were accompanied by members of progressive metal group Haken.

In April 2019, both John Petrucci and Jordan Rudess announced that a new Liquid Tension Experiment reunion is possible, once all involved musicians find time for that.

In May 2020, Jordan Rudess posted a video to the website Cameo stating, in response to a fan's question, that the prospect of Liquid Tension Experiment reuniting "looks very good", with the only barrier being the band members' schedules.

=== Reunion and Liquid Tension Experiment 3 ===
On December 14, 2020, Levin, Portnoy, Rudess and Petrucci released a series of posts on social media (pictures of themselves wearing surgical masks spelling out "LTE 3") teasing a third Liquid Tension Experiment album; a picture of the four of them together with the same masks was posted the following day. On December 17, 2020, it was formally announced that Liquid Tension Experiment 3 would be released by Inside Out Music on March 26, 2021. The album was ultimately released April 16, 2021; the delay was due to printing errors by the manufacturer.

A video for the song "The Passage of Time" was released on January 22, 2021. This was followed up by a video for the song "Beating the Odds" on February 26, 2021, and then by a video for the song "Hypersonic" on March 24, 2021.

In an interview for Revolver magazine, Portnoy revealed the group had signed a two-album deal with InsideOut, and humorously added that a fourth Liquid Tension Experiment album would probably not take another 20 years.

== Band members ==
=== Liquid Tension Experiment ===
- Tony Levin – Chapman Stick, bass guitar, electric upright bass
- John Petrucci – guitar
- Mike Portnoy – drums, percussion
- Jordan Rudess – keyboards

=== Liquid Trio Experiment ===
- Tony Levin – Chapman Stick, bass guitar
- Mike Portnoy – drums, percussion
- Jordan Rudess – keyboards

=== Liquid Trio Experiment 2 ===
- Tony Levin – Chapman Stick, bass guitar
- John Petrucci – guitar
- Mike Portnoy – drums, percussion
- Jordan Rudess – keyboards

== Discography ==
=== Liquid Tension Experiment ===
==== Studio albums ====
Title	Album details	Peak chart positions			Sales
Title	Album details	US	US Int.	JPN	Sales
Liquid Tension Experiment	Released: March 10, 1998; Label: Magna Carta; Formats: CD	—	—	—	US: 30,878
Liquid Tension Experiment 2	Released: June 15, 1999; Label: Magna Carta; Formats: CD	—	8	78	US: 15,721
Liquid Tension Experiment 3	Released: April 16, 2021; Label: Inside Out Music; Formats: CD, BD, LP, DL	109	—	9	JPN: 2,823

==== Live albums ====
Title	Album details
Liquid Tension Experiment Live 2008 - Limited Edition Boxset	Released: 2009; Label: Lazy Tomato; Formats: CD, DVD, Blu-ray
Liquid Tension Experiment Live in NYC	Released: 2009; Label: Lazy Tomato; Formats: CD, DVD
Liquid Tension Experiment Live in LA	Released: 2009; Label: Lazy Tomato; Formats: CD, DVD

=== Liquid Trio Experiment ===
Title	Album details
Spontaneous Combustion	Released: October 23, 2007; Label: Magna Carta Records; Formats: CD

=== Liquid Trio Experiment 2 ===
Title	Album details
When the Keyboard Breaks: Live in Chicago	Released: 2009; Label: Lazy Tomato; Formats: CD

== See also ==
- List of rock instrumentals
