= Magna Carta Records =

American record label

- Founded: 1989
- Distributor(s): Warner Music Group
- Genre: Progressive rock/metal, jazz, alternative rock
- Country of origin: United States
- Location: East Rochester, New York, U.S.

Magna Carta Records is an independent record label located in East Rochester, New York. Magna Carta was formed in 1989 and is owned by Peter Morticelli and his partner Mike Varney. The label, named for the 1215 English document advancing democracy, Magna Carta, has a diverse line-up consisting of musicians from many different genres, but is best known for many of its progressive rock/metal acts. Among the artists featured on the label are OHMphrey, Alex Skolnick Trio, Dave Martone, Kris Norris, and Doug Pinnick (of King's X).

== Distribution ==
As of June 1, 2009, Magna Carta began working with Alternative Distribution Alliance for North American distribution. Magna Carta formerly worked with Rykodisc which was acquired by ADA in early 2009. ADA is a subsidiary of Warner Music Group (WMG).

Magna Carta is distributed by Plastic Head in the UK and by Border Music in Scandinavia.

In June 2018, Magna Carta put its royalties and copyrights up for sale on the music auction site Royalty Exchange. The label had earned $104,000 in the past 12 months and sold for $570,000.

== Roster ==
=== Magna Carta ===
- Alex Skolnick Trio
- Bill Cutler
- Dave Martone
- Doug Pinnick
- Ethan Brosh
- Jordan Rudess
- Kris Norris
- Lief Sorbye
- Michael Lee Firkins
- MoeTar
- OHMphrey
- Oz Noy
- Points North
- Royal Hunt
- Steve Stevens
- Tempest

=== Past ===
- Age of Nemesis
- Altura
- The Android Meme
- Andy West with Rama
- Anthropia
- Attention Deficit
- Billy Sheehan
- Bozzio
- Bozzio Sheehan
- Bozzio/Levin/Stevens
- Cairo
- Caliban
- Clinton Administration
- Dali's Dilemma
- David Lee Roth
- December People
- Derdian
- Derek Sherinian
- Enchant
- Explorers Club
- The Fareed Haque Group
- The Hideous Sun Demons
- Ice Age
- James LaBrie
- James LaBrie's Mullmuzzler
- Kansas
- Khallice
- Lemur Voice
- Leonardo
- Liquid Tension Experiment
- Liquid Trio Experiment
- The Lonely Bears
- Magellan
- Mike Portnoy
- Niacin
- Ozric Tentacles
- Robert Berry
- Robert Walter
- Sadus
- School Of The Arts
- Shadow Gallery
- Simon Phillips
- Speakers For The Dead
- Steve Morse
- Steve Walsh
- Stripsearch
- Tiles
- Tishamingo
- Tony Levin
- Tony Hymas
- Totalasti
- Under The Sun
- Vapourspace
- World Trade

== Tribute albums ==
- Tribute to ELP - "Encores, Legends & Paradox" (1999)
- Tribute to Genesis - "Supper's Ready" (1995)
- Tribute to Jethro Tull - "To Cry You A Song" (1996)
- Tribute to Pink Floyd - "The Moon Revisited" (1995)
- Tribute to Yes - "Tales From Yesterday" (1995)
- Tribute to Rush - "Working Man" (1996)
- Tribute to Rush - "Subdivisions" (2005)
- Tribute to Rush - (2009)
- Tribute to the Titans - Compilation of Magna Carta Tribute Albums (1999)

== Special projects ==
- Guitars That Ate My Brain (2009)
- Drum Nation Volume III (2006)
- Drum Nation Volume II (2005)
- Drum Nation Volume I (2004)
- Guitar Greats Volume I (2007)
- Guitar Greats Volume II (2008)
- Steinway To Heaven (1996)
- A Soundtrack for the Wheel of Time (2001)

== See also ==
- List of record labels
