= List of airports in Canada (L–M) =

This is an list of all Nav Canada certified and registered water and land airports, aerodromes and heliports in the provinces and territories of Canada. The list is sorted alphabetically as shown in the Canada Flight Supplement (and the name as used by the airport if different) and airports names in italics are part of the National Airports System.

They are listed in the format:

- Airport name as listed by either the Canada Flight Supplement (CFS) or the airport authority, alternate name, International Civil Aviation Organization (ICAO) code, Transport Canada Location identifier (TC LID) International Air Transport Association (IATA) code, community and province.

== L ==
Airport name	ICAO	TC LID	IATA	Community	Province or territory
La Biche River Airport		CFP6		La Biche River	Yukon
Lac-à-Beauce Water Aerodrome		CSS7		Lac-à-Beauce	Quebec
Lac Agile (Mascouche) Airport		CSA2		Mascouche	Quebec
Lac-à-la-Tortue Airport		CSL3		Lac-à-la-Tortue	Quebec
Lac-à-la-Tortue Water Aerodrome		CSU7		Lac-à-la-Tortue	Quebec
Lac Berthelot Water Aerodrome		CTS3		Lac Berthelot	Quebec
Lac Brochet Airport	CZWH		XLB	Lac Brochet	Manitoba
Lac-des-Écorces/Heliport Belle-Île		CDE2		Lac-des-Écorces	Quebec
Lac-des-Écorces Water Aerodrome		CTV2		Lac-des-Écorces	Quebec
Lac du Bonnet Airport	CYAX			Lac du Bonnet	Manitoba
Lac du Bonnet (North) Water Aerodrome		CJS9		Lac du Bonnet	Manitoba
Lac Etchemin Airport		CSC5		Lac-Etchemin	Quebec
Lachute Airport		CSE4		Lachute	Quebec
Lac La Biche Airport	CYLB			Lac La Biche	Alberta
Lac Lamothe Water Aerodrome		CLL3		Chute-des-Georges	Quebec
Lacombe (Mustang Helicopters) Heliport		CMH3		Blackfalds	Alberta
Lacombe Regional Airport		CEG3		Lacombe	Alberta
Lac Pau (Caniapiscau) Water Aerodrome		CTP4		Caniapiscau	Quebec
Lac Polaris (Pourvoirie Mirage Inc) Water Aerodrome		CLP3		Mirage Lodge, Polaris Lake, Trans-Taiga Road	Quebec
La Crete (Jake Fehr Memorial) Aerodrome		CFN5		La Crete	Alberta
Lac-Saint-Jean Aerodrome	CYDO		YDO	Saint-Félicien	Quebec
Lac Sébastien Water Aerodrome		CTD3		Saint-David-de-Falardeau (Lac Sébastien)	Quebec
Lac Simon (Blais Aéronautique Inc) Water Aerodrome		CLS7		Lac-Simon	Quebec
Lac Trévet Water Aerodrome		CTX2		Lac Trévet	Quebec
La Grande-3 Airport	CYAD			La Grande-3 generating station	Quebec
La Grande-4 Airport	CYAH		YAH	La Grande-4 generating station	Quebec
La Grande Rivière Airport	CYGL		YGL	Radisson	Quebec
Lake Doucette Water Aerodrome		CDU9		Lake Doucette	Nova Scotia
Lake Joseph/Burnegie Bay Water Aerodrome		CLJ4		Rosseau (Lake Joseph)	Ontario
Lake Joseph/Burnt Island Heliport		CSD8		Lake Joseph	Ontario
Lake Joseph/Eagle Island Heliport		CJE9		Lake Joseph	Ontario
Lake Joseph/Scheinberg Heliport		CSH7		Lake Joseph	Ontario
Lake Muskoka/Alport Bay Water Aerodrome		CLM3		Bracebridge (Lake Muskoka)	Ontario
Lake Muskoka/Aultdowie Island Water Aerodrome		CMA9		Gravenhurst (Lake Muskoka)	Ontario
Lake Muskoka/Boyd Bay Water Aerodrome		CBB3		Bracebridge (Lake Muskoka)	Ontario
Lake Muskoka/Cottage Air Water Aerodrome		CCA4		Bracebridge (Lake Muskoka)	Ontario
Lake Muskoka/Dudley Bay Water Aerodrome		CNT5		Bala (Lake Muskoka)	Ontario
Lake Muskoka East (Milford Bay) Water Aerodrome		CLM7		Bracebridge (Lake Muskoka)	Ontario
Lake Muskoka/Milford Bay Water Aerodrome		CMB6		Milford Bay (Lake Muskoka)	Ontario
Lake Muskoka (Miller Island) Water Aerodrome		CLM6		Torrance (Lake Muskoka)	Ontario
Lake Muskoka/Mortimer's Point Water Aerodrome		CNC7		Port Carling (Lake Muskoka)	Ontario
Lake Muskoka/Rankin Island Water Aerodrome		CRW3		Gravenhurst (Lake Muskoka)	Ontario
Lake Muskoka South Water Aerodrome		CHM5		Gravenhurst (Lake Muskoka)	Ontario
Lake Muskoka/Spirit Bay Water Aerodrome		CCB9		Bracebridge (Lake Muskoka)	Ontario
Lake Rosseau/Arthurlie Bay Water Aerodrome		CPF9		Port Carling (Lake Rosseau)	Ontario
Lake Rosseau/John's Bay Water Aerodrome		CLR2		Windermere (Lake Rosseau)	Ontario
Lake Rosseau/Onnalinda Point Water Aerodrome		COP3		Port Carling (Lake Rosseau)	Ontario
Lake Scugog/Ball Point (Smith) Water Aerodrome		CBP7		Little Britain (Lake Scugog)	Ontario
Lake Scugog/Island View Water Aerodrome		CSV6		Port Perry (Lake Scugog)	Ontario
Lake Simcoe Regional Airport (Barrie-Orillia (Lake Simcoe Regional) Airport)	CYLS		YLK	Barrie	Ontario
La Loche Airport		CJL4		La Loche	Saskatchewan
La Mazaca/Mont Tremblant International Airport (Mont-Tremblant International Airport)	CYFJ			Mont-Tremblant	Quebec
Lamont (Health Care Centre) Heliport		CLM4		Lamont	Alberta
Lampman Airport		CJQ2		Lampman	Saskatchewan
Lampman/Spitfire Air Aerodrome		CSF8		Lampman	Saskatchewan
Lancaster Airpark		CLA6		Lancaster	Ontario
Langley Regional Airport	CYNJ		YNJ	Langley	British Columbia
Lanigan Airport		CKC6		Lanigan	Saskatchewan
Lansdowne House Airport	CYLH		YLH	Neskantaga First Nation	Ontario
La Romaine Airport		CTT5	ZGS	La Romaine	Quebec
La Ronge (Barber Field) Airport	CYVC		YVC	La Ronge	Saskatchewan
La Ronge Heliport		CJX3		La Ronge	Saskatchewan
La Ronge Water Aerodrome		CJZ9		La Ronge	Saskatchewan
La Sarre Airport		CSR8	SSQ	La Sarre	Quebec
Lasqueti Island/False Bay Water Aerodrome		CAT7		Lasqueti Island	British Columbia
La Tabatière Airport		CTU5	ZLT	La Tabatière	Quebec
La Tuque Airport	CYLQ		YLQ	La Tuque	Quebec
La Tuque Water Aerodrome		CTH6		La Tuque	Quebec
Laurel/Whittington Aerodrome		CLW3		Laurel / Whittington	Ontario
Laurie River Airport		CJC8		Laurie River	Manitoba
Leader Airport		CJD5		Leader	Saskatchewan
Leaf Rapids Airport	CYLR		YLR	Leaf Rapids	Manitoba
Leaf Rapids Water Aerodrome		CKA3		Leaf Rapids	Manitoba
Leamington Airport		CLM2		Leamington	Ontario
Leask Airport		CJH8		Leask	Saskatchewan
Lebel-sur-Quévillon Airport		CSH4	YLS	Lebel-sur-Quévillon	Quebec
Lemberg Airport		CKJ9		Lemberg	Saskatchewan
Les Bergeronnes Aerodrome		CTH3		Les Bergeronnes	Quebec
Leslieville/W. Pidhirney Residence Heliport		CWP3		Leslieville	Alberta
Lethbridge Airport	CYQL		YQL	Lethbridge	Alberta
Lethbridge (Chinook Regional Hospital) Heliport		CLH4		Lethbridge	Alberta
Lethbridge (Gunnlaugson) Aerodrome		CGN3		Lethbridge	Alberta
Lethbridge (J3 Airfield) Aerodrome		CLJ3		Lethbridge	Alberta
Lethbridge (Mercer Field) Aerodrome		CMF3		Lethbridge	Alberta
Lethbridge (Taylor Field) Aerodrome		CTF6		Lethbridge	Alberta
Likely Aerodrome		CAX5		Likely	British Columbia
Lillooet Airport	CYLI			Lillooet	British Columbia
Lillooet (Blackcomb) Heliport		CBP5		Lillooet	British Columbia
Lindsay/Kawartha Lakes Municipal Airport		CNF4		Lindsay	Ontario
Little Bear Lake Airport		CKL6		Little Bear Lake	Saskatchewan
Little Churchill River/Dunlop's Fly In Lodge Aerodrome		CJN7		Little Churchill River	Manitoba
Little Current (Manitoulin Health Centre) Heliport		CNT4		Little Current	Ontario
Little Grand Rapids Airport	CZGR		ZGR	Little Grand Rapids	Manitoba
Little Parker Island Heliport		CBK9		Little Parker Island	British Columbia
Little Whitefish Lake (Seguin) Water Aerodrome		CLW5		MacTier	Ontario
Liverpool (Queens General Hospital) Heliport		CLQ2		Liverpool	Nova Scotia
Lloydminster Airport	CYLL		YLL	Lloydminster	Alberta
Lloydminster/Fort Pitt Farms Aerodrome		CFP3		Lloydminster (Note: The main airport serving the city, Lloydminster Airport, is located in Alberta)	Saskatchewan
Lloydminster (Hospital) Heliport		CLH6		Lloydminster	Saskatchewan
London/Chapeskie Field Airport		CLC2		London	Ontario
London International Airport	CYXU		YXU	London	Ontario
London (Pioneer Airpark) Aerodrome		CPN8		London	Ontario
London (University Hospital) Heliport		CPR4		London	Ontario
London (Victoria Hospital) Heliport		CPW2		London	Ontario
London/Watson Airfield		CLW4		London	Ontario
Long Harbour Aerodrome		CLH3		Long Harbour	British Columbia
Long Harbour River Heliport		CLH7		Long Harbour River	Newfoundland and Labrador
Long Pond Heliport		CCX2		Foxtrap	Newfoundland and Labrador
Loon Creek Airfield		CLC4		Cupar	Saskatchewan
Loon Lake Airport		CJW3		Loon Lake	Saskatchewan
Loon River Airport		CFS6		Loon River	Alberta
Louiseville Airport		CSJ4		Louiseville	Quebec
Lourdes-de-Blanc-Sablon Airport	CYBX		YBX	Blanc-Sablon	Quebec
Lourdes-de-Joliette Airport		CSE3		Lourdes-de-Joliette	Quebec
Lower East Pubnico (La Field) Airport		CLE4		Lower East Pubnico	Nova Scotia
Lt. Col W.G. (Billy) Barker VC Airport (RCAF Station Dauphin)	CYDN		YDN	Dauphin	Manitoba
Lucan Airport		CPS4		Lucan Biddulph	Ontario
Lucky Lake Airport		CKQ5		Lucky Lake	Saskatchewan
Lumsden (Colhoun) Airport		CKH8		Lumsden	Saskatchewan
Lundar Airport		CKR4		Lundar	Manitoba
Luseland Airport		CJR2		Luseland	Saskatchewan
Lutselk'e Airport	CYLK			Łutselk'e	Northwest Territories
Lutselk'e Water Aerodrome		CEB9		Łutselk'e	Northwest Territories
Lynn Lake Airport	CYYL		YYL	Lynn Lake	Manitoba
Lynn Lake (Eldon Lake) Water Aerodrome		CKD3		Lynn Lake	Manitoba

== M ==
Airport name	ICAO	TC LID	IATA	Community	Province or territory
126		CBF9		Mabel Lake	British Columbia
Macdonald Airport		CJU3		MacDonald	Manitoba
Macdonald-Cartier International Airport (Ottawa Macdonald–Cartier International Airport)	CYOW		YOW	Ottawa	Ontario
MacGregor Airfield		CKF6		MacGregor	Manitoba
Mackenzie Airport	CYZY		YZY	Mackenzie	British Columbia
Macmillan Pass Airport		CFC4		Macmillan Pass	Yukon
MacTier/Smith Bay Water Aerodrome		CMT4		MacTier	Ontario
Madawaska Lake (Freymond) Water Aerodrome		CMW5		Madawaska	Ontario
Madrona Bay Heliport		CBW9		Madrona	British Columbia
Magog/Aeria Helicentre Heliport		CMA3		Magog	Quebec
Magog/Lessard Heliport		CLS5		Magog	Quebec
Maidstone Aerodrome		CJH3		Maidstone	Saskatchewan
Major-General Richard Rohmer Meaford International Airport (Meaford/Major-General Richard Rohmer Airport)	CYOS		YOS	Meaford	Ontario
Makkovik Airport	CYFT		YMN	Makkovik	Newfoundland and Labrador
Malcolm Island Airport		CJS2		Reindeer Lake	Saskatchewan
Manic-5 Aerodrome		CMN5		Manicouagan	Quebec
Manic 5/Lac Louise Water Aerodrome		CSH8		Daniel-Johnson dam	Quebec
Manitou Airport		CKG5		Manitou	Manitoba
Manitouwadge Airport	CYMG		YMG	Manitouwadge	Ontario
Manitouwadge (Santé/Health) Heliport		CPU4		Manitouwadge	Ontario
Manitowaning/Manitoulin East Municipal Airport	CYEM		YEM	Manitowaning	Ontario
Manitowaning Water Aerodrome		CPJ9		Manitowaning	Ontario
Maniwaki Airport	CYMW		YMW	Maniwaki	Quebec
Manning Airport		CFX4		Manning	Alberta
Mansfield Airport		CPV4		Mansfield	Ontario
Mansons Landing Water Aerodrome		CAV7		Mansons Landing	British Columbia
Maple Creek Airport		CJQ4		Maple Creek	Saskatchewan
Maple Lake Water Aerodrome		CMP3		Maple Lake	Ontario
Marathon Aerodrome	CYSP		YSP	Marathon	Ontario
Marathon (Wilson Memorial Hospital) Heliport		CPX2		Marathon	Ontario
Marcelin/Clayton Air 1 Aerodrome		CMC4		Marcelin	Saskatchewan
Margaret Lake Airport		CFV6		Margaret Lake	Alberta
Markdale (Centre Grey General Hospital) Heliport		CPD9		Markdale	Ontario
Markerville/Safron Farms Aerodrome		CSF5		Markerville	Alberta
Markham Airport (Toronto/Markham Airport)		CNU8		Markham	Ontario
Mary's Harbour Airport	CYMH		YMH	Mary's Harbour	Newfoundland and Labrador
Maryfield Aerodrome		CJQ8		Maryfield	Saskatchewan
Mary River Aerodrome		CMR2	YMV	Mary River	Nunavut
Masset Airport	CZMT		ZMT	Masset	British Columbia
Masset Water Aerodrome		CBN4		Masset	British Columbia
Matagami Airport	CYNM		YNM	Matagami	Quebec
Matane/Russell-Burnett Airport	CYME		YME	Matane	Quebec
Matawatchan Aerodrome		CMW3		Matawatchan	Ontario
Mattawa Airport		CMA2		Mattawa	Ontario
Mattawa (Hospital) Heliport		CMA5		Mattawa	Ontario
Mattawa Water Aerodrome		CPT7		Mattawa	Ontario
Maxville Aerodrome		CMX2		Maxville	Ontario
Maxville (Bourdon Farm) Aerodrome		CMB7		Maxville	Ontario
Mayerthorpe Airport		CEV5		Mayerthorpe	Alberta
Mayerthorpe (Healthcare Centre) Heliport		CMC3		Mayerthorpe	Alberta
Mayne Island (Medical Emergency) Heliport		CBF5		Mayne Island	British Columbia
Mayo Airport	CYMA		YMA	Mayo	Yukon
McArthur River Airport		CKQ8		McArthur River uranium mine	Saskatchewan
McBride/Charlie Leake Field Aerodrome		CAV4		McBride	British Columbia
McCreary Airport		CJR8		McCreary	Manitoba
McGavock Lake Water Aerodrome		CKJ3		McGavock Lake	Manitoba
McKellar (Manitouwabing) Water Aerodrome		CMK2		McKellar	Ontario
McQuesten Airport		CFP4		McQuesten	Yukon
Meadowbank Aerodrome		CMB2		Meadowbank Gold Mine	Nunavut
Meadow Lake Airport	CYLJ		YLJ	Meadow Lake	Saskatchewan
Meaford (Brightshores Health System) Heliport		CPA7		Meaford	Ontario
Meaford/Major-General Richard Rohmer Airport (Major-General Richard Rohmer Meaford International Airport)	CYOS		YOS	Meaford	Ontario
Medicine Hat Airport	CYXH		YXH	Medicine Hat	Alberta
Medicine Hat (Regional Hospital) Heliport		CMH5		Medicine Hat	Alberta
Medicine Hat/Schlenker Airport		CFZ3		Medicine Hat	Alberta
Melbourne Aerodrome		CNM2		Melbourne	Ontario
Melfort (Hospital) Heliport		CMH7		Melfort	Saskatchewan
Melfort (Miller Field) Aerodrome		CJZ3		Melfort	Saskatchewan
Melita Airport		CJT5		Melita	Manitoba
Merritt Airport (Saunders Field)		CAD5	YMB	Merritt	British Columbia
Meteghan/Keizers Air Park		CKZ5		Meteghan	Nova Scotia
Michel-Pouliot Gaspé Airport (Gaspé (Michel-Pouliot) Airport)	CYGP		YGP	Gaspé	Quebec
Middleton (Soldiers Memorial Hospital) Heliport		CMS2		Middleton	Nova Scotia
Midland/Huronia Airport	CYEE		YEE	Midland	Ontario
Midland (Huronia District Hospital) Heliport		CPW6		Midland	Ontario
Midway Aerodrome		CBM6		Midway	British Columbia
Milk River Airport		CEW5		Milk River	Alberta
Millgrove/Dragon’s Fire Heliport		CDF7		Millgrove	Ontario
Milton (AFI) Heliport		CMH2		Milton	Ontario
Milton (District Hospital) Heliport		CPY2		Milton	Ontario
Miminiska Airport		CPS5		Miminiska	Ontario
Miminiska Water Aerodrome		CMA4		Miminiska	Ontario
Minaki Aerodrome		CJA6		Minaki	Ontario
Minaki/Pistol Lake Water Aerodrome		CKP3		Minaki	Ontario
Mindemoya (Hospital) Heliport		CNW4		Mindemoya	Ontario
Minden (Hospital) Heliport		CMI2		Minden Hills	Ontario
Minett (Cliff Island Farm) Water Aerodrome		CMN2		Minett’ (Lake Joseph)	Ontario
Mink Lake Water Aerodrome		CML3		Carleton	Nova Scotia
Minnedosa Airport		CJU5		Minnedosa	Manitoba
Minto Aerodrome		CMN4		Minto Mine	Yukon
Minto Landing Aerodrome		CML7		Minto	Yukon
Miramichi Airport	CYCH		YCH	Miramichi	New Brunswick
Misaw Lake Aerodrome		CAM2		Misaw Lake	Saskatchewan
Mistissini Water Aerodrome		CSE6		Mistissini	Quebec
Mobil Bistcho Airport		CFV3		Mobil Bistcho	Alberta
Molson Lake Airport		CKJ8		Molson Lake	Manitoba
Moncton/Greater Moncton Roméo LeBlanc International Airport (Greater Moncton Roméo LeBlanc International Airport)	CYQM		YQM	Moncton	New Brunswick
Moncton/McEwen Aerodrome		CCG4		Moncton	New Brunswick
Greater Moncton Roméo LeBlanc International Airport (Moncton/Greater Moncton Roméo LeBlanc International Airport)	CYQM		YQM	Moncton	New Brunswick
Moncton/Sailsbury Heliport		CDB5		Moncton	New Brunswick
Mono/Dunby Manor Heliport		CDM4		Mono	Ontario
Montebello Water Aerodrome		CSB6		Montebello	Quebec
Mont-Joli Airport	CYYY		YYY	Mont-Joli	Quebec
Mont-Laurier Airport		CSD4		Mont-Laurier	Quebec
Montmagny Airport		CSE5		Montmagny	Quebec
Montréal–Mirabel International Airport	CYMX		YMX	Montreal	Quebec
Montréal–Trudeau International Airport	CYUL		YUL	Montreal	Quebec
Montréal/Aéroparc Île Perrot		CSP6		Montreal	Quebec
Montréal (Bell) Heliport		CSW5		Montreal	Quebec
Montréal/Boisvert & Fils Water Airport		CSA4		Montreal	Quebec
Montréal East (AIM) Heliport		CSH9		Montreal	Quebec
Montréal/Heliport Senneville		CHS5		Montreal	Quebec
Montréal/Kruger Heliport		CSN2		Montreal	Quebec
Montréal/Les Cèdres Heliport		CSH6		Les Cèdres	Quebec
Montréal/Met (Aéroport Métropolitain de Montéal) Heli-Inter Heliport		CTG2		Longueuil	Quebec
Montreal Metropolitan Airport (Montréal/MET (Aéroport métropolitain de Montréal) Airport,	CYHU		YHU	Longueuil	Quebec
Montréal/Mirabel Hélico Heliport		CMH4		Montreal	Quebec
Montréal/Passport Hélico Heliport		CPP8		Montreal	Quebec
Montréal/Point Zero Heliport		CPZ6		Montreal	Quebec
Montreal River Harbour/Bluearth Bow Lake Windfarm Heliport		CBL5		Montreal River	Ontario
Montréal (Sacre-Coeur) Heliport		CSZ8		Montreal	Quebec
Montréal/Saint-Lazare Aerodrome		CST3		Saint-Lazare	Quebec
Mont-Tremblant/Heliport P3		CHP3		Mont-Tremblant	Quebec
Mont-Tremblant International Airport (La Mazaca/Mont Tremblant International Airport)	CYFJ			Mont-Tremblant	Quebec
Mont-Tremblant (Lac Maskinongé) Water Aerodrome		CMT2		Mont-Tremblant	Quebec
Mont-Tremblant/Saint-Jovite Airport		CSZ3		Saint-Jovite	Quebec
Mont-Tremblant/Saint-Jovite Héli-Tremblant Heliport		CHT3		Saint-Jovite	Quebec
Moose Factory Heliport		CPN3		Moose Factory	Ontario
Moose Jaw/Air Vice Marshal C.M. McEwen Airport (CFB Moose Jaw)	CYMJ		YMJ	Moose Jaw	Saskatchewan
Moose Jaw (Dr. F. H. Wigmore Regional Hospital) Heliport		CWH6		Moose Jaw	Saskatchewan
Moose Jaw Municipal Airport		CJS4		Moose Jaw	Saskatchewan
Moose Lake (Lodge) Airport		CAS2		Moose Lake	British Columbia
Moose Lake (Lodge) Water Aerodrome		CBE8		Moose Lake	British Columbia
Moosomin/Marshall McLeod Field Aerodrome		CJB5		Moosomin	Saskatchewan
Moosonee Airport	CYMO		YMO	Moosonee	Ontario
Morden Regional Aerodrome		CJA3		Morden	Manitoba
Morrisburg Airport		CNS8		Morrisburg	Ontario
Mount Belcher Heliport		CMBH		Mount Belcher	British Columbia
Mount Brydges/Warren Field Aerodrome		CWF3		Mount Brydges	Ontario
Mount Forest (Louise Marshall Hospital) Heliport		CPA2		Mount Forest	Ontario
Mount Hope (Willow Valley) Heliport		CMH8		Mount Hope	Ontario
Mule Creek Airport		CBS4		Mule Creek	British Columbia
Muncho Lake/Mile 462 Water Aerodrome		CBF8		Muncho Lake	British Columbia
Muskeg Tower Airport		CFW4		Muskeg Tower	Alberta
Muskoka Airport	CYQA		YQA	Muskoka	Ontario
Muskrat Dam Airport	CZMD		MSA	Muskrat Dam Lake First Nation	Ontario
Musquodoboit Harbour/Paces Lake Water Aerodrome		CPL5		Musquodoboit Harbour (Paces Lake)	Nova Scotia
Musquodoboit Harbour/Petpeswick Lake Water Aerodrome		CPL9		Musquodoboit Harbour (Petpeswick Lake)	Nova Scotia
Musquodoboit Harbour/Scots Lake Water Aerodrome		CSL2		Musquodoboit Harbour (Scots Lake)	Nova Scotia
