= List of Canadian airports by location indicator: CL =

This is a list of all Nav Canada certified and registered water and land airports, aerodromes and heliports in the provinces and territories of Canada sorted by location identifier.

They are listed in the format:

- Location indicator – IATA – Airport name (alternate name) – Airport location

== CL – Canada – CAN ==
Also see airport category and list.

| TC LID | IATA | Airport name | Community | Province or territory |
|---|---|---|---|---|
| CLA4 | | Holland Landing Airpark | Holland Landing | Ontario |
| CLA6 | | Lancaster Airpark | Lancaster | Ontario |
| CLB2 | | Plattsville (Edward's Air Base) Aerodrome | Plattsville | Ontario |
| CLB3 | | Dwight/South Portage Water Aerodrome | Dwight | Ontario |
| CLB4 | | Thetford Mines/Lac Bécancour Water Aerodrome | Thetford Mines (Lac Bécancour) | Quebec |
| CLB5 | | Red Deer/Leblanc Heliport | Red Deer | Alberta |
| CLC2 | | London/Chapeskie Field Airport | London | Ontario |
| CLC3 | | Calgary (Peter Lougheed Centre) Heliport | Calgary | Alberta |
| CLC4 | | Loon Creek Airfield | Cupar | Saskatchewan |
| CLD3 | | Burns Lake (LD Air) Water Aerodrome | Burns Lake | British Columbia |
| CLE3 | | Shawnigan Lake (Elie Acres) Heliport | Shawnigan Lake | British Columbia |
| CLE4 | | Lower East Pubnico (La Field) Airport | Lower East Pubnico | Nova Scotia |
| CLF2 | | Cheadle/Country Lane Farms Aerodrome | Cheadle | Alberta |
| CLG7 | | Fort McMurray (Legend) Aerodrome | Fort McMurray | Alberta |
| CLH2 | | Stettler (Hospital & Care Centre) Heliport | Stettler | Alberta |
| CLH3 | | Long Harbour Aerodrome | Long Harbour | British Columbia |
| CLH4 | | Lethbridge (Chinook Regional Hospital) Heliport | Lethbridge | Alberta |
| CLH5 | | Bobcaygeon/Chesher Lakehurst Aerodrome | Bobcaygeon | Ontario |
| CLH6 | | Lloydminster (Hospital) Heliport | Lloydminster (Note: The main airport serving the city, Lloydminster Airport, is located in Alberta) | Saskatchewan |
| CLH7 | | Long Harbour River Heliport | Long Harbour River | Newfoundland and Labrador |
| CLH8 | | Bowmanville Haines St. Hospital Heliport | Bowmanville | Ontario |
| CLJ2 | | Port Carling/Lake Joseph Water Aerodrome | Port Carling (Lake Joseph) | Ontario |
| CLJ3 | | Lethbridge (J3 Airfield) Aerodrome | Lethbridge | Alberta |
| CLJ4 | | Lake Joseph/Burnegie Bay Water Aerodrome | Rosseau (Lake Joseph) | Ontario |
| CLK4 | | Saint-Michel-des-Saints/Lac Kaiagamac Water Aerodrome | Saint-Michel-des-Saints | Quebec |
| CLK5 | | Washago/Clearwater Lake North Water Aerodrome | Washago | Ontario |
| CLK6 | | Washago/Clearwater Lake North Heliport | Washago | Ontario |
| CLL3 | | Lac Lamothe Water Aerodrome | Chute-des-Georges | Quebec |
| CLL4 | | Dwight/Limberlost Forest Water Aerodrome | Dwight | Ontario |
| CLL5 | | Roseneath/Lilac Lodge Water Aerodrome | Roseneath | Ontario |
| CLL6 | | Sudbury/Long Lake (Wavy) Water Aerodrome | Greater Sudbury | Ontario |
| CLM2 | | Leamington Airport | Leamington | Ontario |
| CLM3 | | Lake Muskoka/Alport Bay Water Aerodrome | Bracebridge (Lake Muskoka) | Ontario |
| CLM4 | | Lamont (Health Care Centre) Heliport | Lamont | Alberta |
| CLM6 | | Lake Muskoka (Miller Island) Water Aerodrome | Torrance (Lake Muskoka) | Ontario |
| CLM7 | | Lake Muskoka East (Milford Bay) Water Aerodrome | Bracebridge (Lake Muskoka) | Ontario |
| CLM9 | | Orillia/Port Lehmann Water Aerodrome | Orillia (Lake Couchiching) | Ontario |
| CLN4 | | Beaverlodge/Clanachan Aerodrome | Beaverlodge | Alberta |
| CLN5 | | Astorville/Lake Nosbonsing Water Aerodrome | Astorville | Ontario |
| CLP3 | | Lac Polaris (Pourvoirie Mirage Inc) Water Aerodrome | Mirage Lodge, Polaris Lake, Trans-Taiga Road | Quebec |
| CLQ2 | | Liverpool (Queens General Hospital) Heliport | Liverpool | Nova Scotia |
| CLR2 | | Lake Rosseau/John's Bay Water Aerodrome | Windermere (Lake Rosseau) | Ontario |
| CLS2 | | Val-d'Or/Lac Stabell Water Aerodrome | Val-d'Or | Quebec |
| CLS3 | | Fort McMurray (South Liege) Aerodrome | Fort McMurray | Alberta |
| CLS4 | | Porters Lake South Water Aerodrome | Porters Lake | Nova Scotia |
| CLS5 | | Magog/Lessard Heliport | Magog | Quebec |
| CLS6 | | Smithville Aerodrome | Smithville | Ontario |
| CLS7 | | Lac Simon (Blais Aéronautique Inc) Water Aerodrome | Lac-Simon | Quebec |
| CLV2 | | Stayner (Clearview Field) Aerodrome | Stayner | Ontario |
| CLW2 | | Ullswater Aerodrome | Ullswater | Ontario |
| CLW3 | | Laurel/Whittington Aerodrome | Laurel / Whittington | Ontario |
| CLW4 | | London/Watson Airfield | London | Ontario |
| CLW5 | | Little Whitefish Lake (Seguin) Water Aerodrome | MacTier | Ontario |
| CLW6 | | Conestogo/Largo Woods Field Aerodrome | Conestogo | Ontario |
| CLY3 | | Stettler/Lyster Field Aerodrome | Stettler | Alberta |

== CM – Canada – CAN ==
Also see airport category and list.

| TC LID | IATA | Airport name | Community | Province or territory |
|---|---|---|---|---|
| CMA2 | | Mattawa Airport | Mattawa | Ontario |
| CMA3 | | Magog/Aeria Helicentre Heliport | Magog | Quebec |
| CMA4 | | Miminiska Water Aerodrome | Miminiska | Ontario |
| CMA5 | | Mattawa (Hospital) Heliport | Mattawa | Ontario |
| CMA6 | | Tottenham/Mardon Aerodrome | Tottenham | Ontario |
| CMA7 | | Orrville/Martin Lake Water Aerodrome | Orrville | Ontario |
| CMA8 | | Edmundston (Madawaska River) Water Aerodrome | Edmundston (Madawaska River) | New Brunswick |
| CMA9 | | Lake Muskoka/Aultdowie Island Water Aerodrome | Gravenhurst (Lake Muskoka) | Ontario |
| CMB2 | | Meadowbank Aerodrome | Meadowbank Gold Mine | Nunavut |
| CMB3 | | Cambridge (Puslinch Lake) Water Aerodrome | Cambridge (Puslinch Lake) | Ontario |
| CMB5 | | Campbellville (Bellshill Airpark) Aerodrome | Campbellville | Ontario |
| CMB6 | | Lake Muskoka/Milford Bay Water Aerodrome | Milford Bay (Lake Muskoka) | Ontario |
| CMB7 | | Maxville (Bourdon Farm) Aerodrome | Maxville | Ontario |
| CMB8 | | Combermere/Bonnie Brae Airfield | Combermere | Ontario |
| CMB9 | | Port Renfrew (Mill Bay Marine Group) Heliport | Port Renfrew | British Columbia |
| CMBH | | Mount Belcher Heliport | Mount Belcher | British Columbia |
| CMC2 | | Edmonton/Misericordia (Community Hospital) Heliport | Edmonton | Alberta |
| CMC3 | | Mayerthorpe (Healthcare Centre) Heliport | Mayerthorpe | Alberta |
| CMC4 | | Marcelin/Clayton Air 1 Aerodrome | Marcelin | Saskatchewan |
| CMC5 | | Blackie/McElroy Ranch Heliport | Blackie | Alberta |
| CMC8 | | Gravenhurst/Sniders Bay Water Aerodrome | Gravenhurst | Ontario |
| CME2 | | Omemee Aerodrome | Omemee | Ontario |
| CME3 | | Bala (Medora Lake) Aerodrome | Bala | Ontario |
| CMF2 | | Edmonton/Calmar (Maplelane Farm) Aerodrome | Calmar | Alberta |
| CMF3 | | Lethbridge (Mercer Field) Aerodrome | Lethbridge | Alberta |
| CMF4 | | Port Hope (Millson Field) Aerodrome | Port Hope | Ontario |
| CMH2 | | Milton (AFI) Heliport | Milton | Ontario |
| CMH3 | | Lacombe (Mustang Helicopters) Heliport | Blackfalds | Alberta |
| CMH4 | | Montréal/Mirabel Hélico Heliport | Montreal | Quebec |
| CMH5 | | Medicine Hat (Regional Hospital) Heliport | Medicine Hat | Alberta |
| CMH6 | | Valemount (CMH) Heliport | Valemount | British Columbia |
| CMH7 | | Melfort (Hospital) Heliport | Melfort | Saskatchewan |
| CMH8 | | Mount Hope (Willow Valley) Heliport | Mount Hope | Ontario |
| CMI2 | | Minden (Hospital) Heliport | Minden Hills | Ontario |
| CMK2 | | McKellar (Manitouwabing) Water Aerodrome | McKellar | Ontario |
| CML2 | | Quamichan Lake (Raven Field) Airport | Quamichan Lake | British Columbia |
| CML3 | | Mink Lake Water Aerodrome | Carleton | Nova Scotia |
| CML4 | | Gravenhurst (Morrison Lake) Water Aerodrome | Gravenhurst | Ontario |
| CML5 | | Thunder Bay (Martin's Landing) Aerodrome | Thunder Bay | Ontario |
| CML6 | | Six Mile Lake (Hungry Bay) Water Aerodrome | Six Mile Lake | Ontario |
| CML7 | | Minto Landing Aerodrome | Minto | Yukon |
| CML8 | | Saint-Mathieu-de-Laprairie Aerodrome | Saint-Mathieu-de-Laprairie | Quebec |
| CML9 | | Saint-Michel Heliport | Saint-Michel | Quebec |
| CMM3 | | Nanaimo Boat Harbour Heliport | Nanaimo | British Columbia |
| CMN2 | | Minett (Cliff Island Farm) Water Aerodrome | Minett’ (Lake Joseph) | Ontario |
| CMN4 | | Minto Aerodrome | Minto Mine | Yukon |
| CMN5 | | Manic-5 Aerodrome | Manicouagan | Quebec |
| CMN6 | | Edmonton/Morinville (Mike's Field) Aerodrome | Edmonton | Alberta |
| CMP3 | | Maple Lake Water Aerodrome | Maple Lake | Ontario |
| CMR2 | YMV | Mary River Aerodrome | Mary River | Nunavut |
| CMR3 | | Fullerton/Monro Aerodrome | Fullarton | Ontario |
| CMR4 | | Collingwood/Mountain Road Heliport | Collingwood | Ontario |
| CMR6 | | Camrose/St. Mary's Hospital Heliport | Camrose | Alberta |
| CMS2 | | Middleton (Soldiers Memorial Hospital) Heliport | Middleton | Nova Scotia |
| CMS3 | | Saint-Michel-des-Saints/Port Saint Michel Water Aerodrome | Saint-Michel-des-Saints | Quebec |
| CMT2 | | Mont-Tremblant (Lac Maskinongé) Water Aerodrome | Mont-Tremblant | Quebec |
| CMT3 | | Calgary (Foothills Hospital McCaig Tower) Heliport | Calgary | Alberta |
| CMT4 | | MacTier/Smith Bay Water Aerodrome | MacTier | Ontario |
| CMW3 | | Matawatchan Aerodrome | Matawatchan | Ontario |
| CMW5 | | Madawaska Lake (Freymond) Water Aerodrome | Madawaska | Ontario |
| CMX2 | | Maxville Aerodrome | Maxville | Ontario |
| CMY2 | | Chipman/M.Y. Airfield | Chipman | Alberta |
| CMY3 | | Clairmont/Meyer’s Airstrip | Clairmont | Alberta |
