= Wenonah (1866) =

19th century steamship operating near Ontario

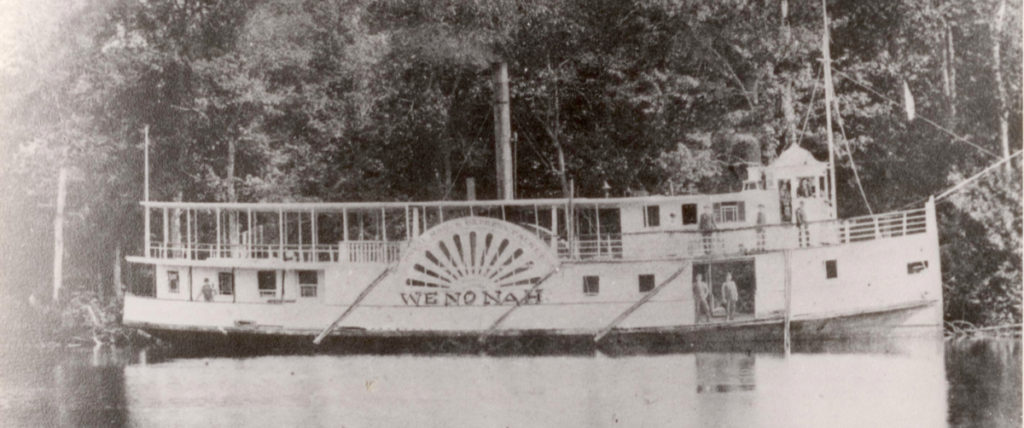
- Muskoka's first steamship, the sidewheeler Wenonah.

History
- Operator: Muskoka Navigation Company
- Completed: 1866

Wenonah was a sidewheel steamship, built by Alexander Peter Cockburn, on Lake Muskoka, in 1866. She was the first vessel employed by the Muskoka Navigation Company. She carried passengers, mail and freight, and towed logs for the lumber industry, mainly on a cluster of connected lakes that covered much of the county of Muskoka, Ontario, Canada. Some sources also say she was the first steamship on the Magnetawan River, north of Muskoka.

Cockburn was elected to the Ontario Provincial Parliament in 1867. According to the Dictionary of Canadian Biography, "[by] the spring of 1869 he had induced the Ontario government to build a lock on the Indian River at Port Carling and a canal at Port Sandfield, to allow steamers to extend their runs to lakes Rosseau and Joseph." Cockburn also played a role in passing legislation to have rail service extended to Gravenhurst, one of the other ports served by the Muskoka steamships.

Wenonah was abandoned in 1886, in favor of newer vessels.

In 2002 a modern excursion vessel, the Wenonah II, was constructed to give passengers the look and feel of a traditional Muskoka Steamship. She was named in honour of the original Wenonah, although her appearance more closely matches vessels like her berthmate, the heritage vessel RMS Segwun, built a few decades later.
