= Muskoka River =

Coordinates: 45.0267°N 79.3869°W

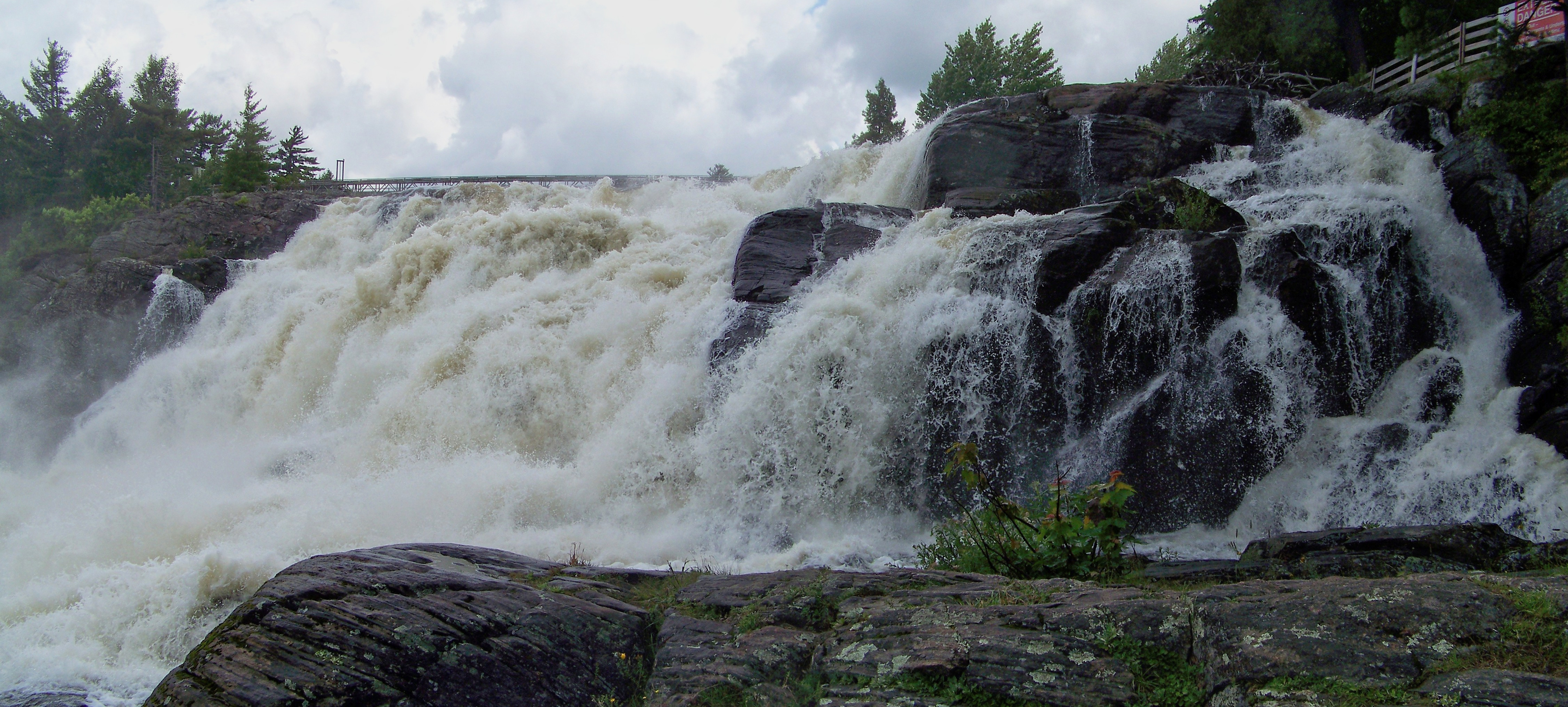
- High Falls in Bracebridge on the north branch of the Muskoka River

Location
- Country: Canada
- Province: Ontario

Physical characteristics
- Source: Algonquin Provincial Park
  - location: Burnt Island Lake
  - elevation: 525 m (1,722 ft)
- Mouth
  - location: Two outlets into Georgian Bay via Go Home Lake and Moon River.
  - elevation: 177 m (581 ft)

The Muskoka River is a river in the Muskoka District of Ontario, Canada. The river is the third largest river draining the southern Ontario land mass by average annual flow.

It rises in the highlands of Algonquin Park and flows southwest through a number of lakes including

- Lake Muskoka
- Lake Joseph
- Lake Rosseau
- Lake of Bays

which empty into Georgian Bay south of Parry Sound by way of the Moon and Musquash Rivers.

Tributaries include the:

- Indian River
- Hollow River
- Oxtongue River
- Buck River
- East River

Communities on the river include:

- Bracebridge, Ontario
- Huntsville, Ontario

The name "Muskoka" comes from the name of a chief of the Ojibwe in this region, "Mesqua Ukee" (Miskwaa-aki: Red Earth).

== In fiction ==
There is also a Muskoka River in Nancy Drew's fictional home town of River Heights, located somewhere in the Midwestern United States.

== See also ==
- List of Ontario rivers
