= Billy Bishop Airport (disambiguation) =

Billy Bishop Toronto City Airport (IATA: YTZ) is an airport in Toronto, Canada.

Billy Bishop Airport may also refer to:

- Major-General Richard Rohmer Meaford International Airport, formerly Owen Sound Billy Bishop Regional Airport (IATA: YOS), Meaford, Canada
- Billy Bishop Toronto City Water Aerodrome (TC LID: CPZ9), Toronto, Canada
