= Medora Township =

Medora Township may refer to:

- Medora Township, Reno County, Kansas, United States
- Medora Township, Ontario, Canada, now part of Muskoka Lakes
