= Lake Muskoka =

Lake in Muskoka District, Ontario, Canada

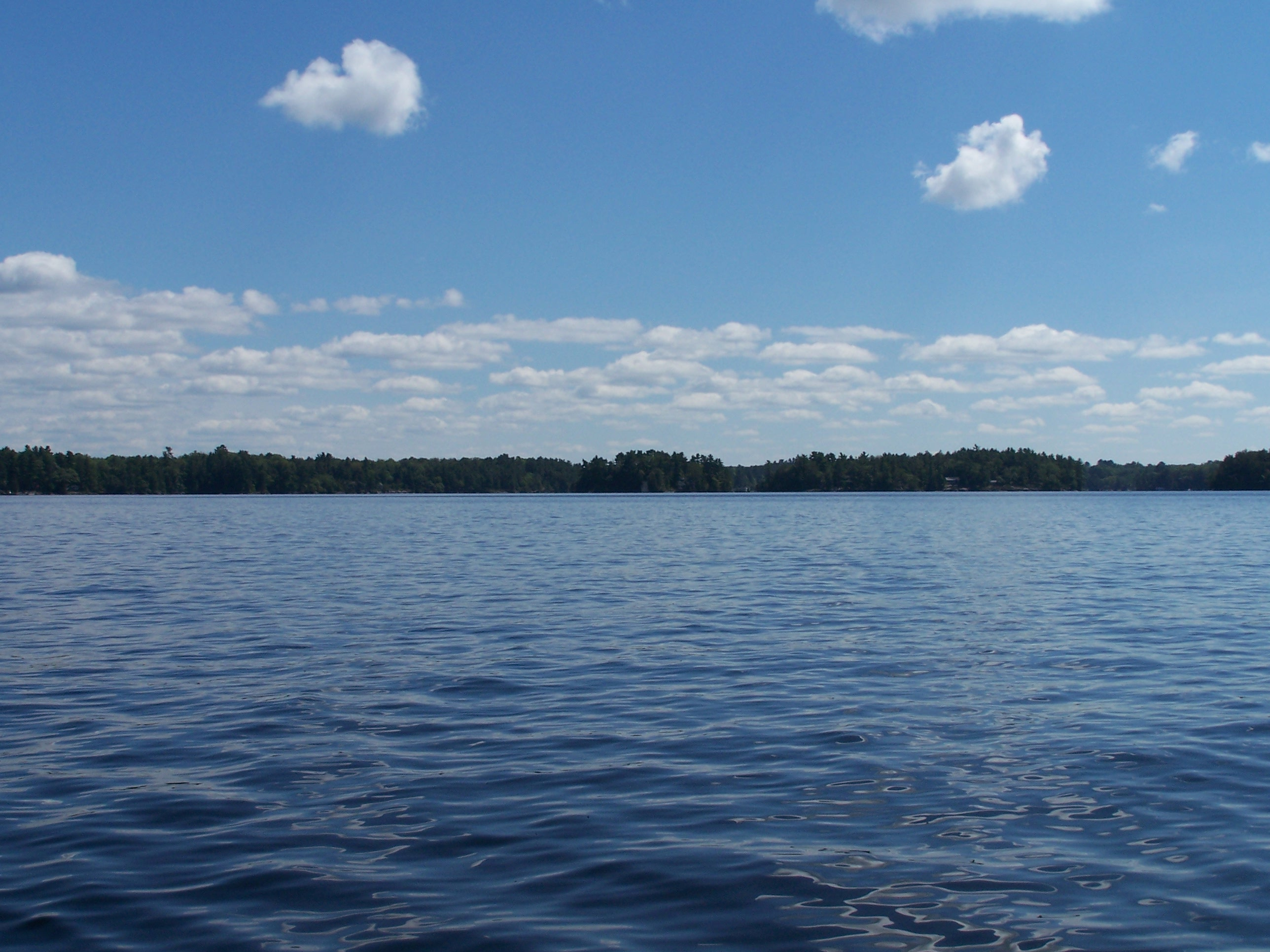

- Location within Ontario
- Location: Ontario
- Coordinates: 45°02′N 79°27′W
- Primary inflows: Muskoka River, Indian River
- Primary outflows: Moon River
- Basin countries: Canada
- Surface area: 120 km^{2} (46 sq mi)
- Surface elevation: 225 m (738 ft)
- Islands: Browning Island, Eleanor Island
- Settlements: Muskoka Lakes, Gravenhurst, Bala

Lake Muskoka is located between Port Carling and Gravenhurst, Ontario, Canada. The lake is surrounded by many cottages. The lake is primarily within the boundary of the Township of Muskoka Lakes, the southeast corner is within the boundary of the Town of Gravenhurst, and another small portion around the mouth of the Muskoka River is within the boundary of the Town of Bracebridge. The town of Bala is located on the southwestern shores of the lake, where the Moon River starts. Lake Muskoka is connected to Lake Rosseau through the Indian River and lock system at Port Carling. The lake is mainly fed by the Muskoka River, Lake Joseph and Lake Rosseau.

== History ==
=== Algonquin and Huron ===
The first mention of Muskoka in any records was in 1615, when territory was occupied by indigenous peoples, mainly consisting of the Algonquin and Huron tribes. Early European explorers to the region like Samuel de Champlain came to the area, followed by missionaries. The name "Muskoka" comes from the name of an Ojibwe or Chippewa tribe chief named Musquakie, which means "not easily turned back in the day of battle". Also known as Chief Yellowhead, it was Mesqua who signed the treaties made between the indigenous peoples and Province of Canada, which sold about 250,000 acres (1,010 km^{2}) of land in the area to the province. He was so revered by the Ontario government that they built a home for him in Orillia, where he lived until his death at age 95.

Geography drove history in the Muskoka region. Studded with lakes and abundant with rocks, the land offered an abundance of fishing, hunting, and trapping but was poorly suited to farming. Largely the land of the Ojibwa people, European inhabitants ignored it while settling the more promising area south of the Severn River. The Ojibwa leader associated with the area was Mesqua Ukie for whom the land was probably named. The tribe lived south of the region, near present-day Orillia, and used Muskoka as their hunting grounds. Another Ojibwa tribe that lived in the area of Port Carling was called Obajewanung. The tribe moved to Parry Sound around 1866.

=== European ===
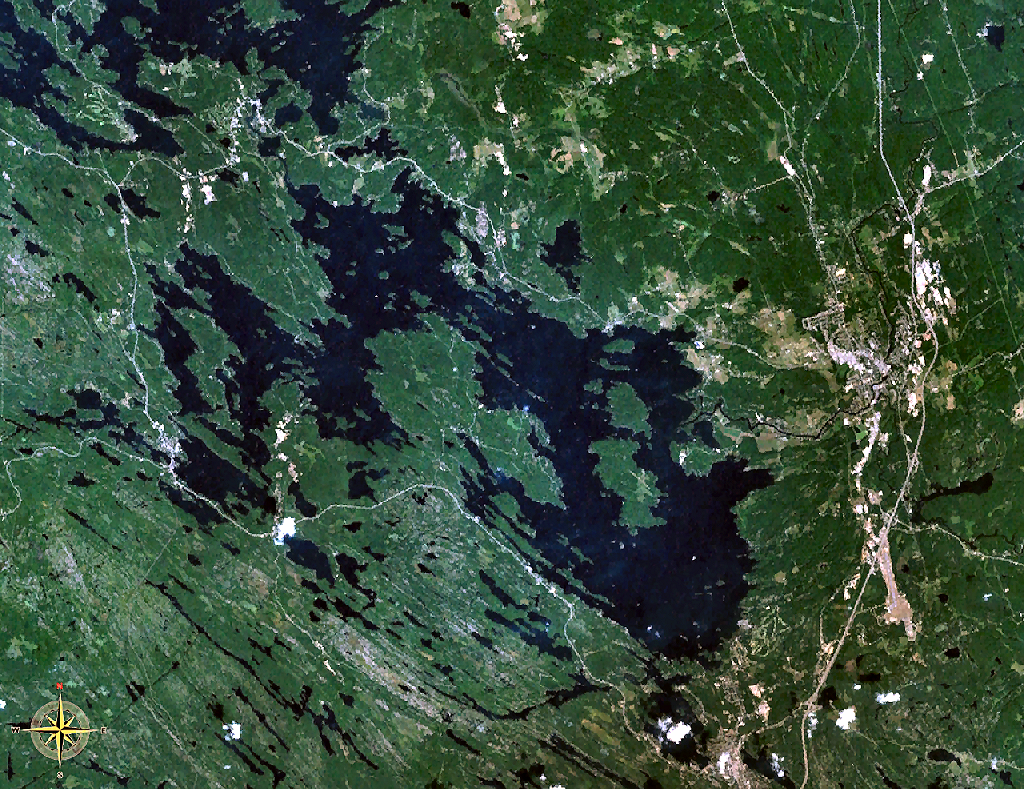
Satellite image of the lake

Largely unsettled until the late 1760s, the region had its European presence in largely limited to seasonal fur trapping, but no significant trading settlements were established. Colonial government interest increased following the American Revolution; fearing invasion from its new neighbor to the south, the government began exploring the region in the hopes of finding travel lanes between Lake Ontario and Georgian Bay In 1826. Lieutenant Henry Briscoe became the first white man known to have crossed the middle of Muskoka. David Thompson drew the first maps of the area in 1837; camped at the present-day Bala during the evening of August 13/14, 1837; and later possibly camped near present-day Beaumaris.

Canada experienced heavy European immigration in the mid-19th century, especially from Ireland, which experienced famine in the 1840s. As the land south of the Severn was settled, the government planned to open the Muskoka region further north to settlement. Logging licenses were issued in 1866, which opened Monck Township to logging. The lumber industry expanded rapidly denuding huge tracts of the area, but also prompted the development of road and water transportation. The railroad pushed north to support the industry, reaching Gravenhurst in 1875 and Bracebridge in 1885. Road transportation took the form of the Muskoka Colonization Road, which was begun in 1858 and reached Bracebridge in 1861. The road was roughly hewn from the woods and was of corduroy construction and so logs were placed perpendicular to the route of travel to keep carriages from sinking in the mud and swamps, which made for extremely rugged travel. The lumbering industry spawned a number of ancillary developments including, as mentioned, transport but also settlements began springing up to supply the workers and Bracebridge (formerly North Falls) saw some leather tanning businesses develop. Tanners used the bark from lumber to tan hides thereby using what otherwise would be a waste product.

The passages of the Free Grants and Homestead Act of 1868 brought opened the era of widespread settlement to Muskoka. Settlers could receive free land if they agreed to clear the land, have at least 15 acres (61,000 m^{2}) under cultivation, and build a 16 by 20-foot (6.1 m) house. Settlers under the Homestead Act, however, found the going hard. Clearing 15 acres (61,000 m^{2}) of dense forest is a huge task, but once the land was clear, they were greeted with Muskoka's ubiquitous rocks, which themselves had to be cleared. The soil in the region turned out to be poorly suited to farming, consisting largely of dense clay. As news of the difficult conditions spread back to the south, it looked as though development in Muskoka might falter but for a fortuitous development. Since the railroads had not yet arrived, and road travel was notoriously unreliably and uncomfortable, the transportation king was the steamship. Once a land connection was made to the southern part of the lake, in Gravenhurst, the logging companies could harvest trees along the entire lakefront with relative ease so long as they had the means of powering the harvest back to the sawmills in Gravenhurst.

=== Canadian steamship era ===
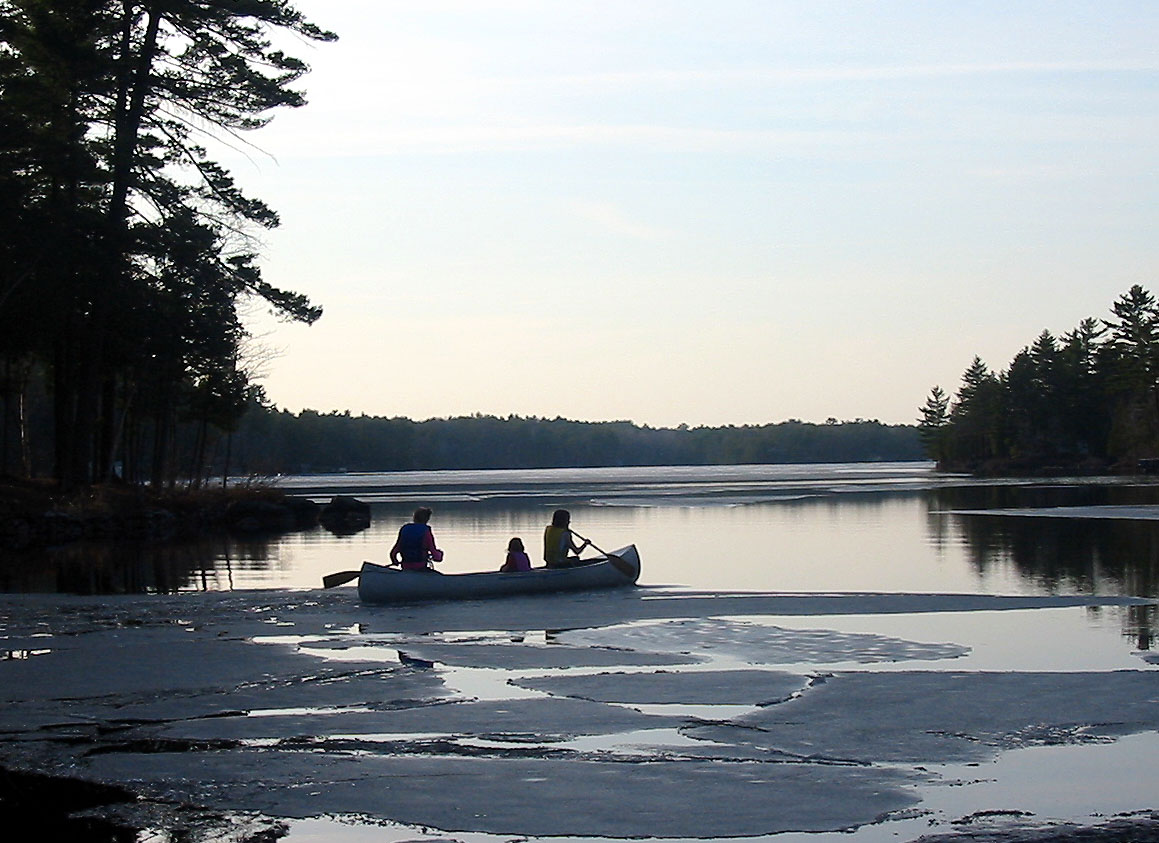
Lake Muskoka, 2005.

Alexander Cockburn, sometimes called the Father of Muskoka, began placing steamers on the lake. Starting with the Wenonah, Ojibwa for first daughter, in 1866 Cockburn pressed the government to open the entire Muskoka lake system to navigation by installing locks in Port Carling, to link Lake Muskoka and Lake Rosseau, and opening a cut at Port Sandfield, to link Lake Rosseau and Lake Joseph. The government was eager to reinforce development in light of the faltering agricultural plan, and built the locks in Port Carling in 1871. Cockburn's steamers now had access to the entire lake system. The first stop for the semi-weekly steamer, Wenonah, was Walker's Point eight miles from Gravenhurst where fisherman could access good bass fishing at Shanty Bay. Through the years he added more ships and when he died in 1905, his Muskoka Navigation Company was the largest of its kind in Canada. RMS Segwun, built in 1887 as Nipissing, is still in service as at 2019.

In 1860, two young men, John Campbell and James Bain Jr, made a journey that marked them as perhaps the first tourists in the region. Taking the Northern Railway to Lake Simcoe, they took the steamer Emily May up the lake to Orillia, rowed across Lake Couchiching, and walked up the Colonization Road to Gravenhurst where they vacationed. They liked what they saw and repeated the journey every year bringing friends and relatives. The early tourist pioneers increased demand for transport services in the region, drawn by excellent fishing, natural beauty, and an air completely free of ragweed providing relief for hay fever sufferers. Early tourists built camps but were joined by others desiring better accommodation. Farmers who were barely scratching a living from the rocky soil soon found demand for overnight accommodation, resulting in the first boarding houses and hotels. The first wilderness hotel was built at the head of Lake Rosseau in 1870, called Rosseau House. It was owned by New Yorker W.H. Pratt. The idea caught on and tourists came establishing the tourist industry as the up-and-coming money earner in the 1880s.

The steamship era gave rise to the area's great hotels: Rosseau, Royal Muskoka, Windemere, and Beaumaris. The area grew rapidly when the railroad reached Gravenhurst in 1875. Indeed, travel from Toronto, Pittsburgh, and New York became less a matter of endurance than expenditure. Trains regularly made the run from Toronto to Gravenhurst where travelers and their luggage were transferred to the great steamers of the Muskoka Navigation Co. such as the Sagamo, which made regular stops up the lakes, including Bracebridge, Beaumaris, and Port Carling. Tourists there could transfer to smaller ships such as the Islander, which could enter smaller ports. Vacationers often remained in the region for weeks or even months in the summer. As families became seasonally established, they began building cottages near the hotels. At first simple affairs replicating the rustic environment of the early camps, but later grander including in some cases housing for significant staff. Initially, cottagers relied on rowboats and canoes for daily transport and would sometimes row substantial distances. Eventually, the era of the steam and gasoline launch came and people relied less on muscle power and more on motors. With the boats came the boathouses, often elaborate structures in their own right mimicking in many cases the look and feel of the main cottage.

=== Postwar automobile era ===
World War I caused a significant dip in the tourist activity for the area and hence the economy. Technological advancements in the motorboat and the automobile resulted in greater overall growth of the area and development spread across the area, including the construction of better roads. As vacationers no longer needed the steamships in order to reach the lake, they built cottages farther afield and demand for the steamships dropped. World War II caused another decline as wartime shortages kept many Americans at home and many Canadians were engaged in war activities. Postwar prosperity brought another boom based around the automobile and the newly affordable fiberglass boat. Owning a summer cottage became more attainable for many in the middle class, resulting in further development around the lake. The steamship companies retired their boats one by one until the last sailing in the late 1950s.

== Airplane crashes ==
During World War II, a crash into Lake Muskoka occurred involving a Northrop Nomad A-17A, which still contains the remains of the British pilot, Peter Campbell, and Canadian pilot, Ted Bates. The pair collided with another Nomad over southern Lake Muskoka and all crashed into the lake's icy depths on December 13, 1940, while searching for another pilot that had gone missing in a snow storm the day before. The other plane's two dead crew members were brought to the surface in 1941, leaving Campbell and Bates' bodies on the lake's 140-foot bottom. They were recovered in 2010, and the plane, Nomad 3521, was recovered in October 2014.

Between 1942 and 1945, at the Muskoka Airport, the Royal Norwegian Air Force (RNAF) trained Norwegian pilots during World War II at what was then called "Little Norway." One of the planes from a training mission crashed off of Norway Point, killing the pilot. The aircraft was accidentally recovered by a cable crew snagging the plane in 1960 and the pilot was found inside. For reasons unknown the plane was cut free and fell back to the bottom with the pilot still inside. Authorities are investigating this site as time allows. The RNAF's first fatal accident in Muskoka and the last one recorded by the FTL in Canada took place in August 1944 when a Fairchild PT-19 Cornell trainer with pilot and student aboard lost its wing and crashed into the ground south of Gravenhurst; both on board died. The bodies were recovered from the dense undergrowth and a wing section was found, but no wreckage was recovered. Not long after, another Fairchild crashed for the same reason, but both occupants escaped by parachute.

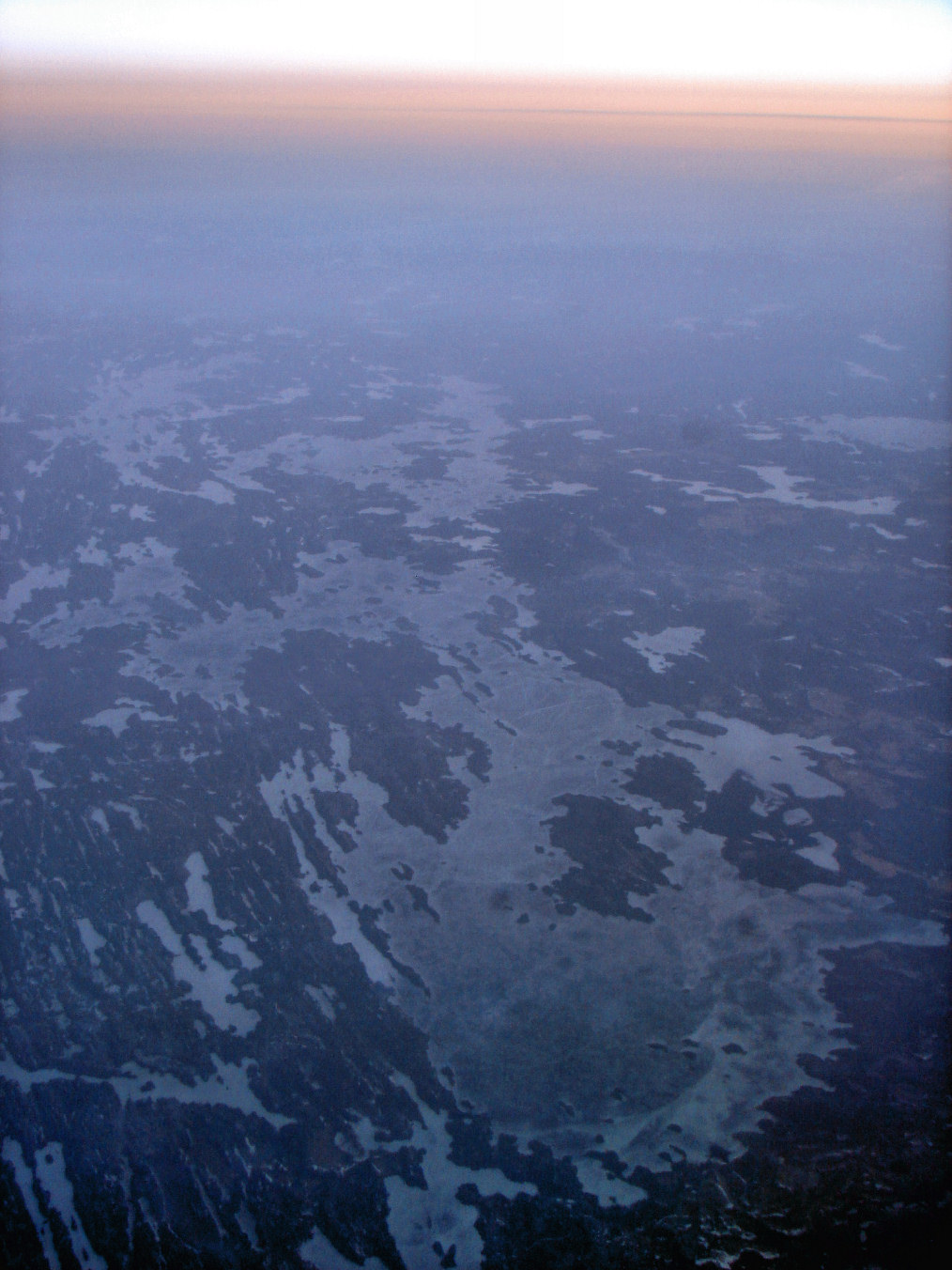
Aerial sunrise view of Lake Muskoka

== Muskoka Lakes Association ==
The Muskoka Lakes Association (MLA) is a lake advocacy group that focuses on maintaining the Muskoka area for future generations of cottagers, as Lake Muskoka is a major hub for many cottagers in the area. The Muskoka Lakes association was formed in 1894, therefore has been functioning for over 120 years. The Muskoka Lakes Association also focuses on Lake Muskoka's sister lakes – Lake Joseph, as well as Lake Rosseau. The MLA currently represents thousands of people in the Muskoka area, both local and seasonal.

One of the primary focuses of the MLA is to invest in the quality of the lake itself. They started with the contemporary Water Quality Initiative in 2000, however "early MLA water testing began in 1972"; over 100 volunteers, in 2013, collected water samples from designated sites in order to facilitate this initiative. These samples are used to analyze various bacteria counts in the water, the amount of dissolved organic carbon, phosphorus, temperature trends, and calcium. In 2013 the MLA collected over 1100 water samples from the Muskoka area. As seen in the 2013 Water Quality Report, the Muskoka Lakes Association focuses on 18 key areas affecting the Lake Muskoka region: Alport Bay, Arundle Lodge, Bala Bay, Beaumaris, Boyd Bay, Browning Island, Dudley Bay, East Bay, Eilean Gowan, Muskoka Bay, Muskoka Sands, North Bay, Stephen's Bay, Taylor Island, Walker's Point, Whiteside Bay, and Willow Beach.

Beyond the Water Quality Initiative, the Muskoka Lakes Association extends environmental advocacy by holding seminars in partnership with the Muskoka Conservancy as well as the Ontario Trillium Foundation. The seminars act as " a vehicle to inform shoreline owners on manageable ways to protect the quality of our lakes and rivers and encourage the preservation of natural water’s edge habitats. Lisa Noonan, Office Manager, Muskoka Lakes Association." The MLA also holds an annual Seedling Day in mid-late spring in which waterfront residents can preorder and purchase native plants to help prevent erosion of their shoreline.

The Muskoka Lakes Association has always largely focused on water-based issues. Almost 100 years ago, the MLA campaigned for the federal government to require all pleasure crafts to have working lights. The many issues that surround safe and respectful boating continue to be a primary concern of the MLA. The MLA aims to reduce boating issues through their partnership with BOATsmart!, by encouraging boaters to receive proper and practical boating instructions. The MLA does so by providing discounts to MLA members towards BOATsmart! boating courses. The Muskoka Lakes Association is also a founding partner of Safe and Quiet Lakes, which is an association of volunteers.

=== In popular culture ===
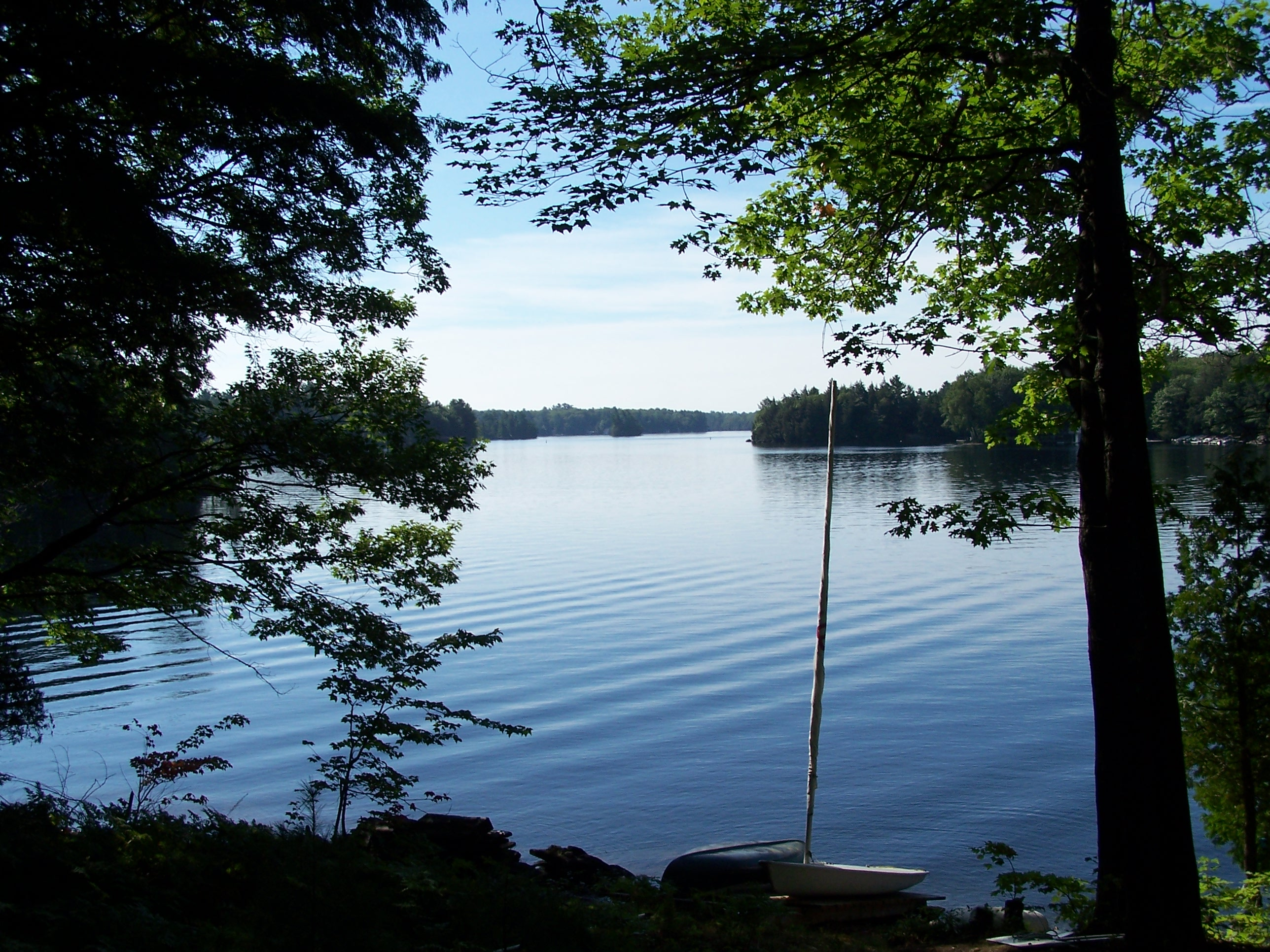
Shore of Lake Muskoka

Lake Muskoka was referenced by cartoon character Chris McLean in the fictional Fresh TV hit show, Total Drama Island of the Total Drama series, in which teenage contestants complete challenges in order to win C$100,000 (for the first season) and C$1,000,000 (second season and onward). The lake that is mentioned surrounds an island named Camp Wawanakwa, yet the island is in fact, not real. The island made appearances in the first, fourth and fifth seasons and the 2023 reboot.

Lake Muskoka was the setting of the 2024 comedy film My Old Ass and the 2026 coming-of-age television series Sterling Point, both by writer-director Megan Park. It also featured prominently in the final episode of season 1 of the 2025 series Heated Rivalry.

== See also ==
- List of lakes in Ontario
