= Royal Muskoka Hotel =

Coordinates: 45.192744°N 79.587503°W

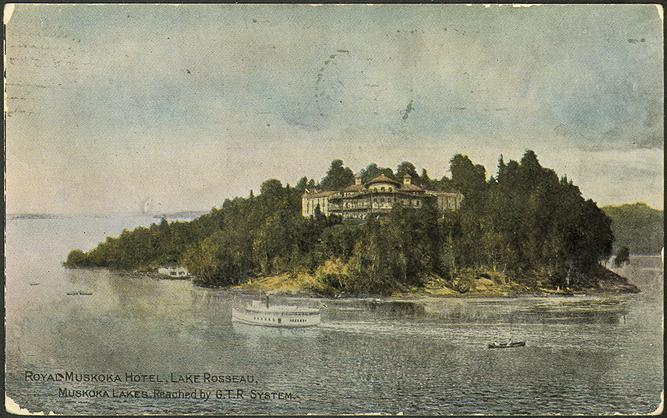

General information
- Location: Lake Rosseau, Ontario
- Opened: 2 August 1901
- Destroyed: 18 May 1952

Design and construction
- Architect: Edgar Beaumont Jarvis

The Royal Muskoka Hotel was a luxury summer resort hotel that operated from 1901 to 1952 on Lake Rosseau in Ontario's Muskoka region. The hotel was built by the Muskoka Lakes Navigation Company and was serviced by its steamers. During its first three decades, the Royal Muskoka was Ontario's preeminent summer resort and attracted guests from the upper echelons of Canadian and American society. After the onset of the Great Depression, the hotel struggled through the 1930s. During World War II it saw a mild revival as vacations in Europe were no longer possible, but following the war its problems resumed. In the early hours of 18 May 1952, a fire razed the entire structure.

== History ==
The Royal Muskoka Hotel was the first grand hotel built on the Muskoka Lakes. The project grew out of the Muskoka and Georgian Bay Navigation Company, which had been founded in 1880 by Alexander Peter Cockburn (1837–1905). By the turn of the century, his shipping business had declined due to the expansion of railways. A Toronto lawyer named Ernest L. Sawyer acquired a controlling interest in the company and on 10 April 1901 reincorporated it as the Muskoka Lakes Navigation Company. Sawyer's plan for the new company was threefold: 1) to build two new hotels on the Muskoka Lakes; 2) to partner with the Grand Trunk Railway to increase service to Muskoka Wharf Station in Gravenhurst; and 3) to increase steamboat services on the lakes. To build the hotel, the company formed a new entity called the Muskoka Lakes Navigation and Hotel Company. The hotel was designed by architect Edgar Beaumont Jarvis (1864–1948) of Toronto. The first manager was J. D. Crawford. Around 1905 Lucius Messenger Boomer (1878–1947), who later managed the Waldorf Astoria New York, took over the role.

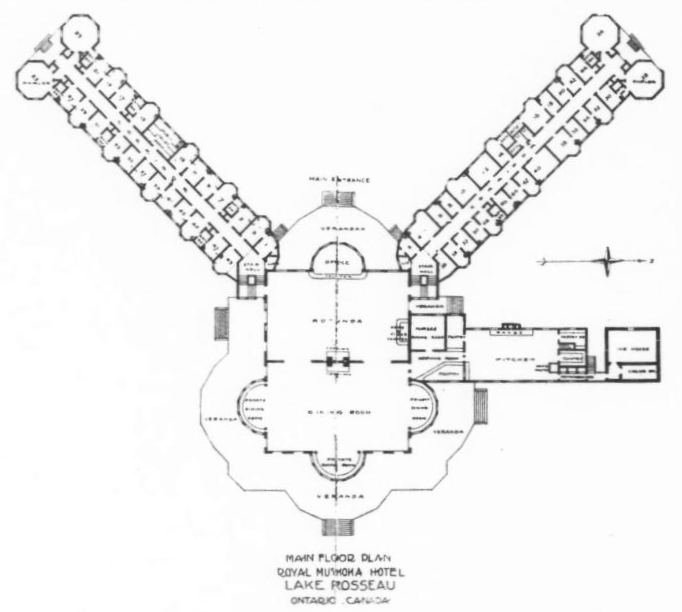
Main floor plan of the hotel

Although it was opened in August 1901, the hotel was not completed the following year. It accommodated 350 guests and the final construction cost was $171,908.25. The Venetian design featured two three-storey guest wings that were connected in the center by a main building. Two towers flanked the main block and offered panoramic views of the lake. The main building included a central rotunda and a three-storey verandah. Jarvis's design borrowed many elements from the winter resorts in Florida built by Henry Flagler. The property also had three cottages, riding stables, tennis courts, a nine-hole golf course, and lawn bowling greens. A boathouse and wharf were provided for the steamers to deliver and pick up guests. The Muskoka Lakes Navigation Company built its flagship the SS Sagamo specifically to ferry guests travelling to and from the hotel.

From 1901 to 1929, the hotel was full during the June-to-September season. Guests came from the élite of society and included dignitaries and royalty. On 2 August 1914, Prime Minister Sir Robert Borden was staying at the hotel when he was summoned to return to Ottawa before the British Empire entered World War I.

After the Wall Street crash of 1929 and the beginning of the Great Depression, the Royal struggled for much of the next decade. During World War II business picked up due to the impossibility of travel to Europe. However, when the war ended business slowed again. In 1946, Gordon Douglas Fairley gained control of the shipping company and the hotel. He renovated the structure, at which time capacity was reduced to 175. Poor marketing also led to a decline in patronage.

In the early hours of Sunday, 18 May 1952, a fire engulfed the hotel and burned down the entire structure. In subsequent years, the property was subdivided and used for cottages. The property retains the name Royal Muskoka Island.
