= Camp Ekon =

- Camp Ekon logo

- Location within Southern Ontario
- Alternative names: Stanley House

General information
- Location: Rosseau, Seguin, Ontario, P0C 1J0., Canada
- Coordinates: 45.214446°N 79.729470°W
- Named for: 'Healing tree' in Wyandot
- Groundbreaking: 1888
- Renovated: 1922
- Closed: February 4, 2024
- Owner: Society of Jesus
- Affiliation: Roman Catholic

Design and construction
- Known for: Summer camps

Website
- Ekon.ca

Camp Ekon also known as Stanley House was a property and resort for summer camps. It was situated on the shore of Lake Joseph on Stanley House Road in Rosseau in the township of Seguin, Ontario. It was run by the Society of Jesus, part of the Roman Catholic Church. The original Stanley House was built in 1888. It burned down in 1921 and was rebuilt a year later. In 1937, the Jesuits moved into the premises. They used it as a location to teach Regis College summer courses, host retreats in Ignatian spirituality as well as various meetings and conferences.

On February 4, 2024, a letter was posted on the official Camp Ekon Instagram account notifying the community that "the Jesuits of Canada have decided to permanently close Camp Ekon henceforth", with the letter citing financial concerns and high operating costs as the main motive for the closure. It is, as of yet, unclear if Camp Ekon or the property will be retained by the Jesuits or if it will be sold.

== History ==
In 1888, W. B. McLean built Stanley House as a hotel. It had towers and was four stories tall. In 1907, it was bought by Edward Leef. In 1910, he sold it to his father-in-law, William Bissonette.

In 1921, Stanley House and the surrounding boat house and barn all burnt down in a fire. The following year, the Bissonette family rebuilt the hotel.

In 1937, the Jesuits leased the site. In 1941, they purchased it and the surrounding five-acre area for $15,000. In 1953, the Jesuits expanded the property by buying a nearby 1.5 acre garden. In 1971, Camp Ekon was started. Fr. Brian Massie, S.J. was the founder and decided to call it 'Ekon' because that was the name given to Saint Jean de Brébeuf by the Wyandot people. 'Ekon' means 'the healing tree' and referred to Jean de Brébeuf's height. In 1978, the Diocese of Peterborough donated an old church building, which became the Camp Director's Cottage, with the provision that it not be used for religious services. In 1991, the Jesuits bought the Shore Road Allowance, which previously separated the property from the lake. In 1993, renovations on the site began. In 1996, the arts studio was finished.

Camp Ekon also used 'Little Round Island', which is also known as 'Little Chief'. It is to the south east of the site and is trust for the camp by the Massie family.

== Overview ==
About Camp Ekon, the Toronto Star wrote, "Jesuit in philosophy, Roman Catholic in tradition and public in service, the camp is open to all faiths and culture because there are no boundaries when it comes to leadership," and the motto of the camp was 'looking out for the little guy and carrying the heavy load'.

== See also ==
- List of Jesuit sites
- Our Lady of Lourdes Church, Toronto
