= William Eli Sanford =

Canadian politician

The Honourable William Eli Sanford
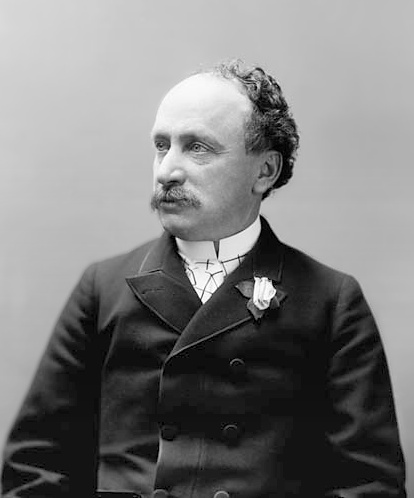

Canadian Senator from Ontario
- In office February 8, 1887 – July 10, 1899
- Appointed by: John A. Macdonald

Personal details
- Born: September 16, 1838 New York City, U.S.
- Died: July 10, 1899 (aged 60) Lake Rosseau, Ontario, Canada
- Resting place: Hamilton Cemetery
- Party: Conservative
- Spouse(s): Emmeline (Jackson) Sanford, Harriet Sophie (Vaux) Sanford
- Children: 4

William Eli Sanford (September 16, 1838 – July 10, 1899) was a Canadian businessman, philanthropist, and politician.

== Background ==
Born in New York City, he was orphaned before his seventh birthday and then moved to Hamilton, Canada West, to live with his paternal aunt.

In 1887, he was summoned to the Canadian Senate. A Conservative, he represented the senatorial division of Hamilton, Ontario.

He drowned in 1899 in Lake Rosseau, Ontario. He is interred in the Sanford Family vault in Hamilton Cemetery.

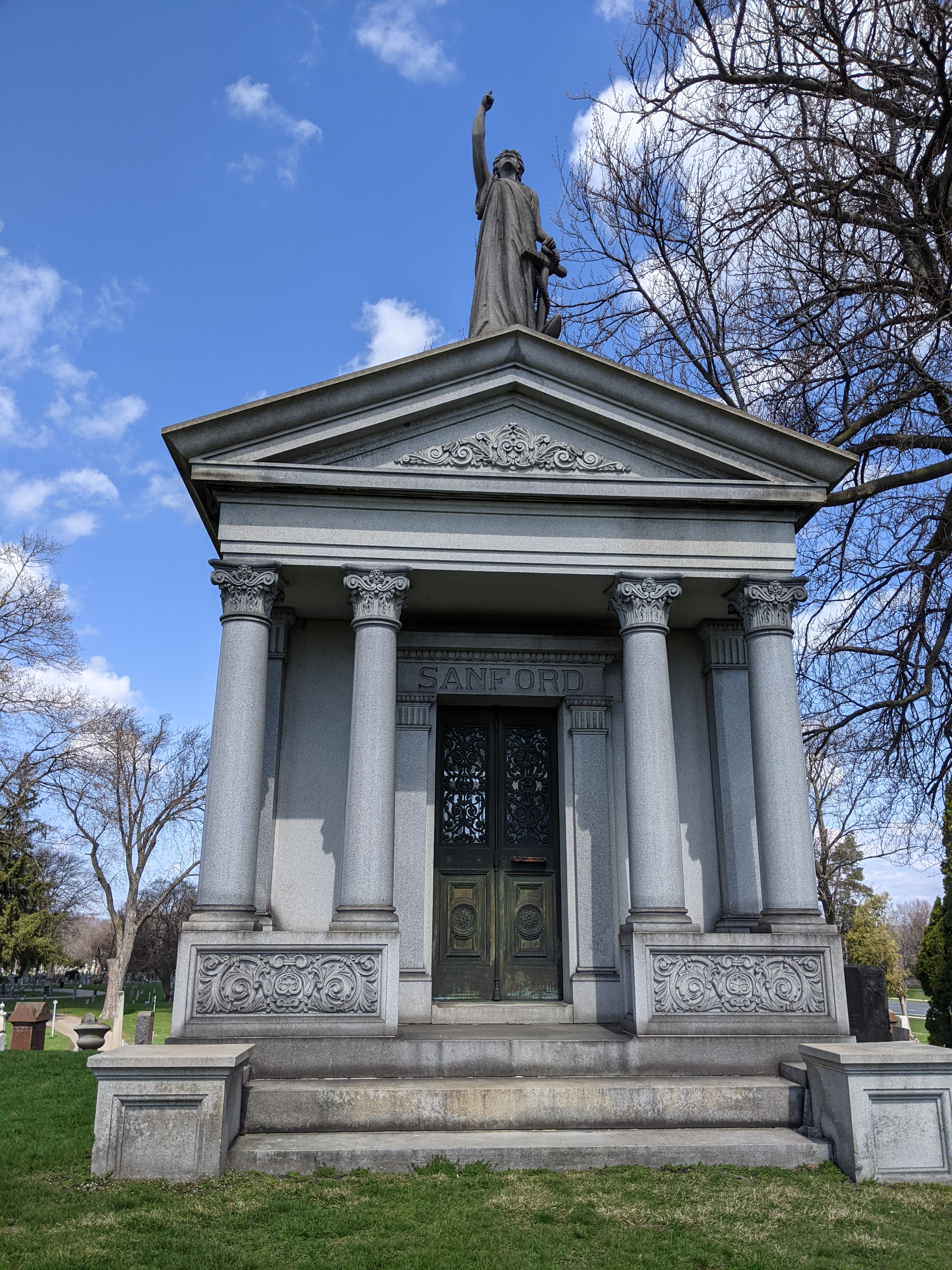
Resting place of William Eli Sanford.
