= Port Sandfield, Ontario =

Coordinates: 45°06′58″N 79°37′18″W

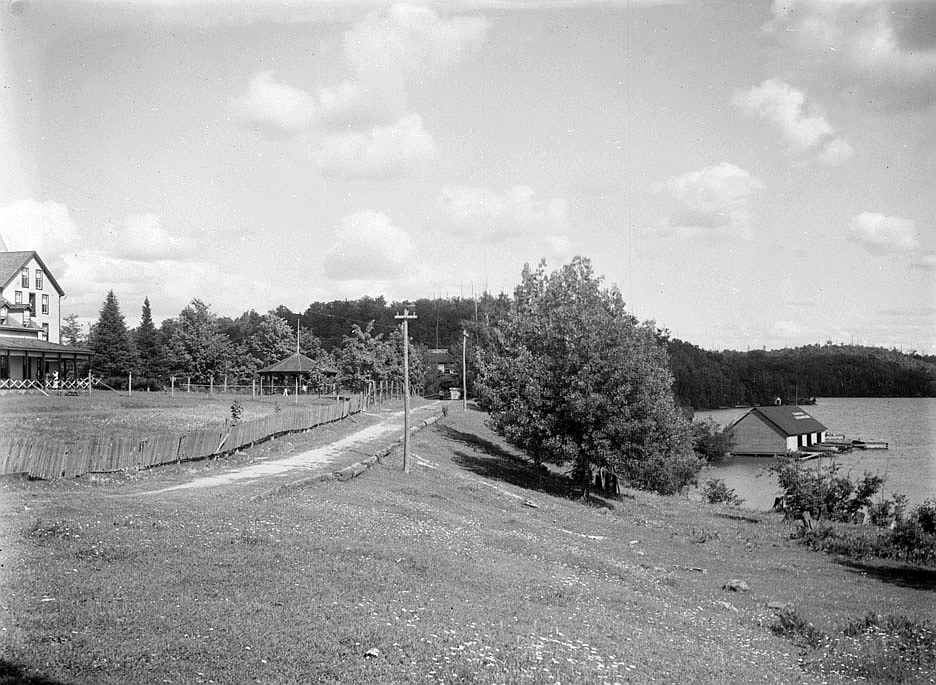
Prospect House Hotel in Port Sandfield, 1904

Port Sandfield is a community on Lake Rosseau in Ontario, Canada, located within and governed by the municipality of Muskoka Lakes. It was founded in 1870, when a canal was built connecting Lake Joseph to Lake Rosseau. Alexander Peter Cockburn, a member of the Ontario Provincial Parliament and founder and first President of the Muskoka Settlers’ Association played a leading role in getting the canal funded. The canal was funded at the same time as a lock at Port Carling. The canal and lock allowed a fleet of steamboats to carry freight, mail, cargo and timber over the three largest lakes in the county of Muskoka.

Port Sandfield was named after John Sandfield MacDonald, who was then the Premier of Ontario. The swing bridge over the canal was built in 1924.

The canal fell into disuse, but was rehabilitated in 1999.
