= Rosseau, Ontario =

Community in Canada

Coordinates: 45°15′30″N 79°38′30″W

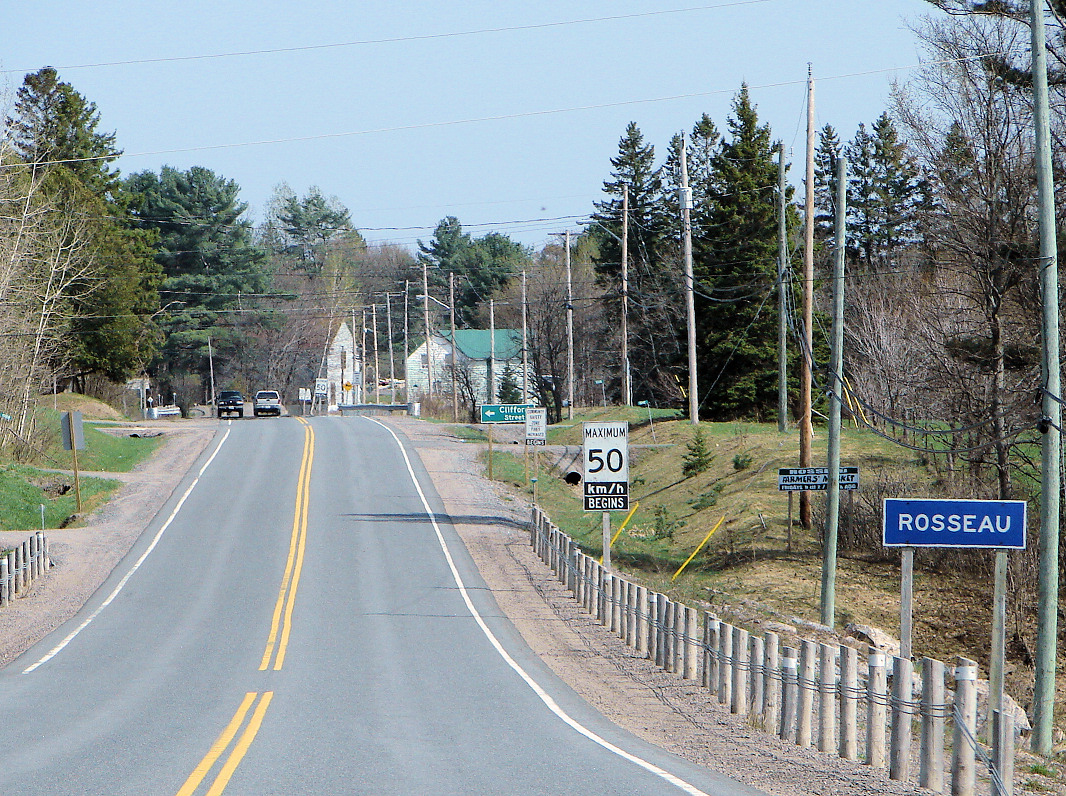
Highway 141 at Rosseau

Rosseau Lighthouse

Rosseau is a community in the District of Parry Sound in Ontario, Canada, located in the township of Seguin. It is situated on the north shore of Lake Rosseau, a popular vacationing area. It is one of the ends of the Rosseau-Nipissing Road, which stretches all the way up to Lake Nipissing, near North Bay, Ontario. An Ontario Historical Plaque was erected by the province to commemorate the Rosseau-Nipissing Road's role in Ontario's heritage.

Rosseau was formerly an incorporated village, which was amalgamated into the newly created Seguin Township on January 1, 1998.

The town shops are mostly arts and crafts shops with a few exceptions. One of them is the famous Rosseau General Store, which has stood since the late 19th century. The town has a marina and public beach area that has undergone renovations including new boat launches and large docks, a pavilion and public washrooms. The town also has a restaurant and a cafe. There are many shops; Rosseau is a tourist area, with many people visiting in the summer months to enjoy the scenery, shop for arts and crafts, or stop at the historic buildings. The town also hosts summer farmers markets and the Rosseau Fall Fair in late August, when people from all over Ontario come to have fun. Rosseau is serviced by roads which provide access to Huntsville, Parry Sound, Bracebridge, Windermere and other small communities in the area. Most lake travellers are familiar with the famous lighthouse which light still shines.

The local post office in the centre of the village services locals with lock boxes and one rural route.

The townsfolk and tourists of Rosseau in the late 19th century and early 20th century welcomed visitors arriving by steamboat, by singing the Rosseau Song (arrival song):

Oh we'll sing a little song of Rosseau,
It's the best old town that I know
Oh you Rosseau, where the summer breezes blow,
Where the skies are the clearest and the girls that you meet are the fairest,
Oh you Rosseau, you're the best old town that I know.

As the steamboat departed at the end of the visitors’ holiday, the visitors wistfully returned the favour by singing the Rosseau Song (departing song) to the townsfolk:

Rosseau Town—again it's time to say to Rosseau Town –Good-bye
When we came, we all were smiling, now we leave you with a sigh
But when summer comes once more
We'll return to you again
Oh Rosseau Town, again it's time to say to Rosseau Town—Good-by.

The first verse was sung to the same tune as the Cobalt Song, which adopted the original tune of the Rosseau Song. The second verse was sung to a different tune, which was likely improvised.

== Demographics ==
In the 2021 Census of Population conducted by Statistics Canada, Rosseau had a population of 288 living in 95 of its 149 total private dwellings, a change of 29.1% from its 2016 population of 223. With a land area of 1.75 km^{2} (0.68 sq mi), it had a population density of 164.6/km^{2} (426.2/sq mi) in 2021.

== See also ==
- Camp Ekon
- Rosseau Lake College
