= Windermere, Ontario =

Village in Ontario, Canada

- Village
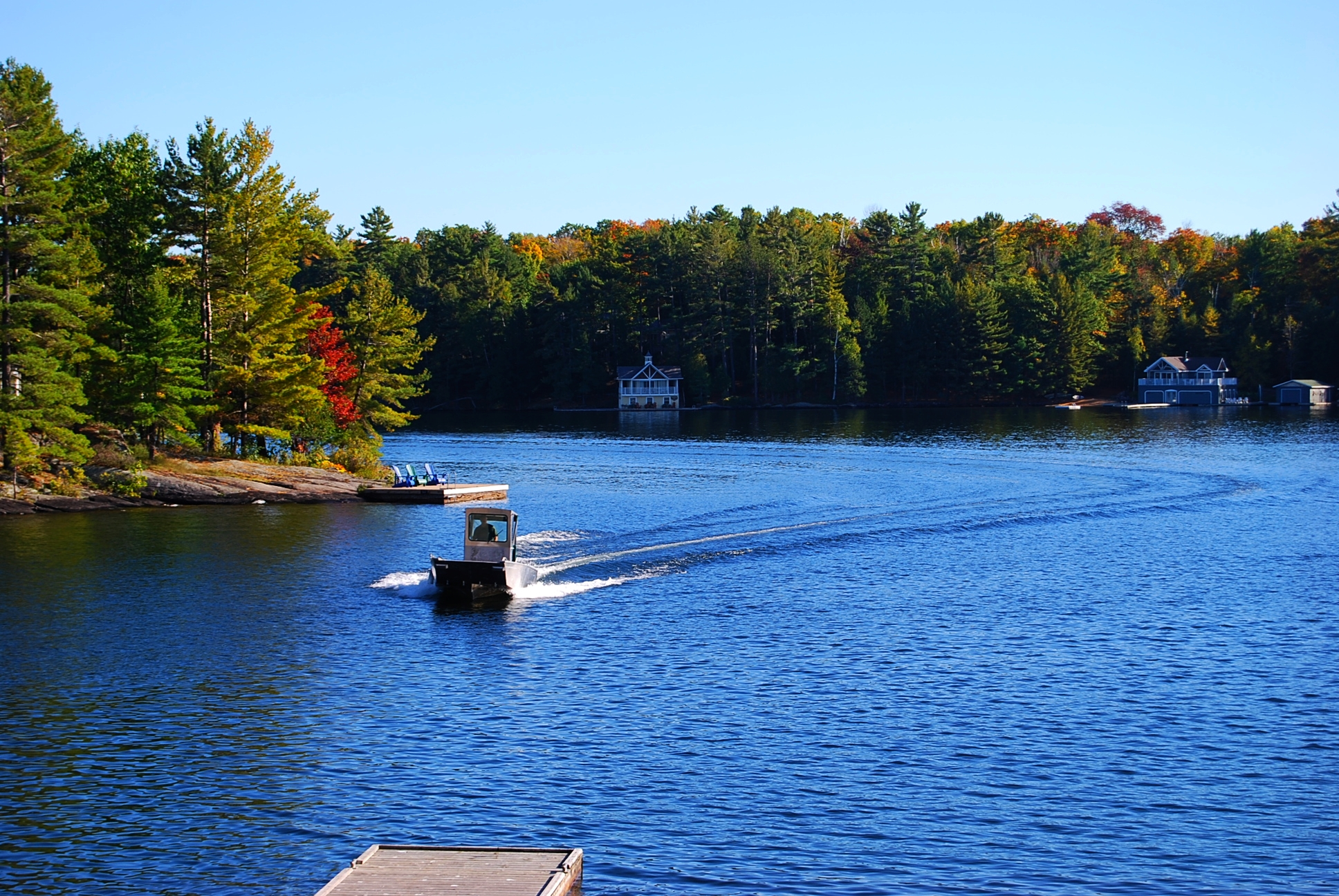
- Service boat nearing the Windermere boat docks

- Location within Southern Ontario
- Coordinates: 45.1636°N 79.5506°W
- Country: Canada

Population
  - Total: 100
- Postal code: P0B 0A2

Windermere is a community situated on the east side of Lake Rosseau, within and governed by the municipality of Muskoka Lakes.

== Attractions and Venues ==
Windermere hosts two resorts, two community centres, two public beaches, two public docks, an eighteen-hole golf course and a post office all within a 500 metre radius. Besides the town, which maintains much of its older architecture, there are several tourist and cultural sites:

- Windermere House Resort
- Windermere Golf & Country Club
- Windermere Village Hall
- Windermere Community Centre
- Windermere Wharf
- Muskoka Chautauqua
