= Lloydminster Hospital =

Hospital in Lloydminster, Saskatchewan, Canada

Geography
- Location: Lloydminster, Saskatchewan, Canada
- Coordinates: 53.2725°N 109.9896°W

Organization
- Care system: Public
- Type: Community Hospital
- Network: Saskatchewan Health Authority

Services
- Beds: 58

Helipads
- Helipad: TC LID: CLH6

Links
- Lists: Hospitals in Canada

Lloydminster Hospital is a community hospital in the border community of Lloydminster, Saskatchewan, Canada. The hospital is operated by the Saskatchewan Health Authority, and also serves the Alberta community under contract to Alberta Health Services.
