= Indian River (Muskoka District) =

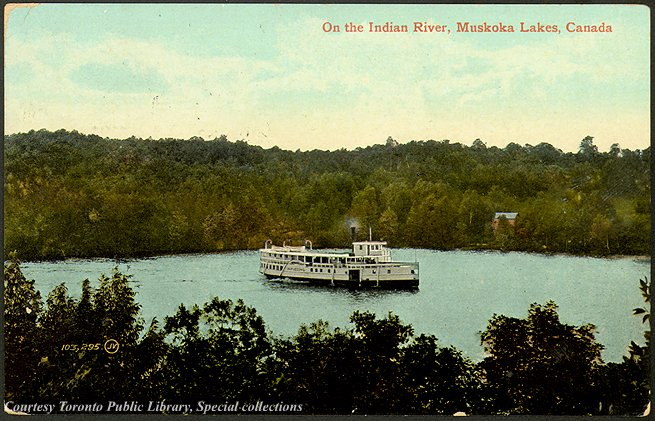
- Steamship on the Indian River, 1910

- Location of the mouth of the river in Ontario

Location
- Country: Canada
- Province: Ontario
- Region: Central Ontario
- District: Muskoka
- Municipality: Muskoka Lakes

Physical characteristics
- Source: Lake Rosseau
  - coordinates: 45°07′12″N 79°34′38″W
  - elevation: 228 m (748 ft)
- Mouth: Lake Muskoka
  - coordinates: 45°05′37″N 79°33′44″W
  - elevation: 226 m (741 ft)

Basin features
- River system: Great Lakes Basin

The Indian River is a river in Muskoka Lakes, Muskoka District in Central Ontario, Canada. It is in the Great Lakes Basin, and connects Lake Rosseau (upstream) with Lake Muskoka (downstream).

The river exits Lake Rosseau at Port Carling Dam, flows through the Forman Narrows into Mirror Lake, and reaches its mouth at Lake Muskoka off Hanna Point. The river was made navigable by the erection of the dam and creation of locks in 1871. This allowed steamships to pass between the two lakes and spurred the development of recreational resorts on Lake Rosseau, and on Lake Joseph further upstream.

== See also ==
- List of rivers of Ontario

== Sources ==
- Map 5 (PDF) (Map). 1 : 700,000. Official road map of Ontario. Ministry of Transportation of Ontario. 2010-01-01.
- Restructured municipalities - Ontario map #4 (Map). Restructuring Maps of Ontario. Ontario Ministry of Municipal Affairs and Housing. 2006. Archived from the original on 2014-04-10.
