= Maple Lake (Ontario) =

Lake in Haliburton County, Ontario, Canada

- Location within Ontario
- Location: Ontario
- Coordinates: 45.0958°N 78.6721°W
- Basin countries: Canada
- Surface area: 336 ha (830 acres)
- Average depth: 38.6 ft (11.8 m)
- Max. depth: 123 ft (37 m)
- Water volume: 31,999 acre⋅ft (39.470 hm^{3})
- Surface elevation: 1,033 ft (315 m)
- Islands: none

Maple Lake is a lake in the southern portion of Haliburton County, Ontario, Canada. Maple Lake is located north-east of Carnarvon and north-west of Haliburton and is easily reached via Highway 118 on its southern shores and North Shore Road for northern shore. Public access to the lake is available from the municipal access via the boat launch at 1085 Stanhope Airport Road. The lake is semi annually stocked with yearling Lake Trout by the Haliburton Highlands Outdoors Association. Anglers also fish for whitefish, walleye, largemouth and smallmouth bass. A population of muskie does also exist in the lake, although fishing for this is generally fairly slow. It is part of a chain of lakes that includes Pine, Green and Beech lakes. Access by small boat is possible between Maple, Green and Pine.

== See also ==
- List of lakes in Ontario
