= Meaford Airport =

Major-General Richard Rohmer Meaford International Airport
- IATA: YOS; ICAO: CYOS

Summary
- Airport type: Public
- Operator: Meaford Airport
- Location: Meaford, Ontario
- Time zone: EST (UTC−05:00)
  - Summer (DST): EDT (UTC−04:00)
- Elevation AMSL: 1,008 ft / 307 m
- Coordinates: 44°35′26″N 080°50′18″W
- Website: Major-General Richard Rohmer Meaford International Airport

Map
- Location in Ontario

Runways
Direction	Length		Surface
Direction	ft	m	Surface
18/36	3,933	1,199	Asphalt
- Source: Canada Flight Supplement

Major-General Richard Rohmer Meaford International Airport (IATA: YOS, ICAO: CYOS), or more commonly known as Meaford Airport, is an airport located 3 nautical miles (5.6 km; 3.5 mi) east of Owen Sound, Ontario, Canada in the Municipality of Meaford. The airport is named for Major-General Richard Rohmer, a Second World War fighter pilot.

The airport is classified as an airport of entry by Nav Canada and is staffed by the Canada Border Services Agency (CBSA) on a call-out basis from the Region of Waterloo International Airport on weekdays and the John C. Munro Hamilton International Airport on weekends. CBSA officers at this airport can handle general aviation aircraft only, with no more than 15 passengers.

The Meaford airport was previously named Owen Sound Billy Bishop Regional Airport, after the larger nearby town of Owen Sound and the Canadian World War I flying ace Billy Bishop. In November 2009, the Toronto City Centre Airport added Billy Bishop at the start of its name, creating confusion with the Meaford airport. In September 2024, the Meaford airport changed its name to Major-General Richard Rohmer Meaford International Airport. Rohmer, who turned 100 on 24 January 2024, attended the renaming.

== Transportation ==
The airport is located along Ontario Highway 26. Parking is located next to the main airport building.
