= Port Carling =

Unincorporated community in Ontario, Canada

- Unincorporated community
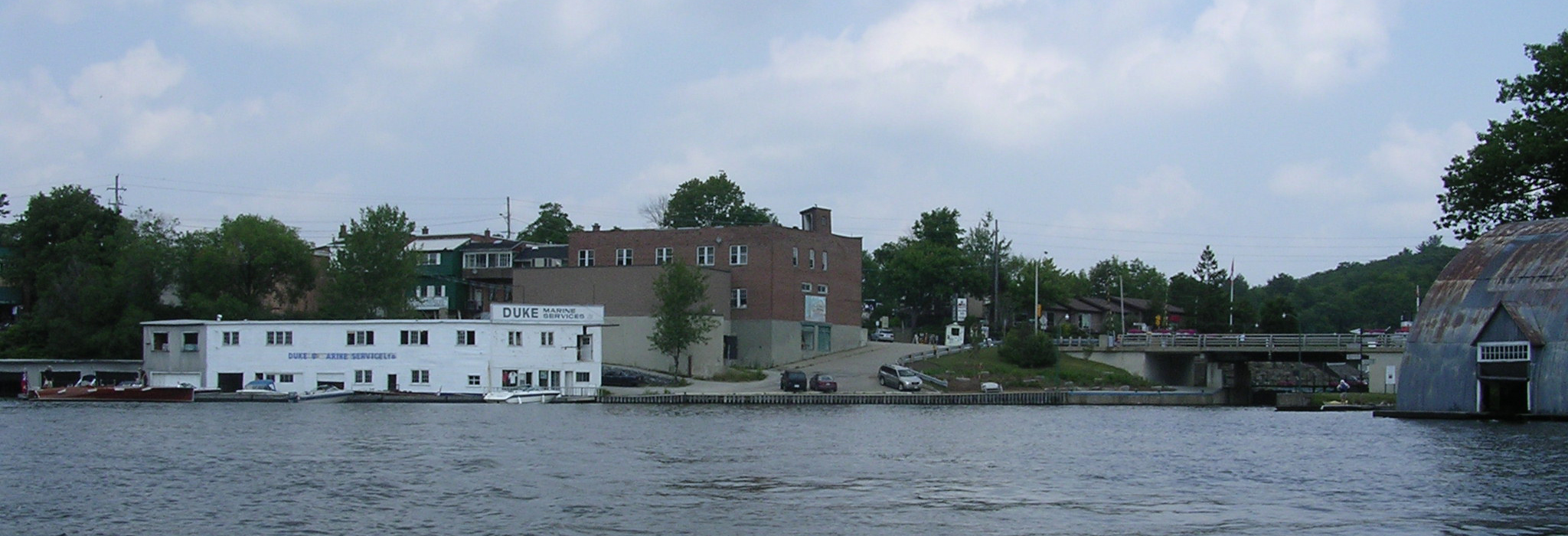
- Steamboat Bay, south side of Port Carling

- Location within Southern Ontario
- Coordinates: 45°06′49″N 79°34′23″W
- Country: Canada
- Province: Ontario
- District: Muskoka
- Municipality: Muskoka Lakes
- Settled: 1860s
- Incorporated: 1896
- Dissolved (amalgamated): January 1, 1971

Government
  - Fed. riding: Parry Sound—Muskoka
  - Prov. riding: Parry Sound—Muskoka
- Elevation: 240 m (790 ft)
- Time zone: UTC-5 (EST)
  - Summer (DST): UTC-4 (EDT)
- Postal code: P0B
- Area code: 705

Port Carling is an unincorporated community in the Township of Muskoka Lakes in the Canadian province of Ontario. It has been the municipal seat of the township since 1971. It has several hundred year-round residents and is a service centre for thousands of other seasonal residents in the area.

== Geography ==
Port Carling is located on the Indian River and owes its importance to its key position on the water routes of the area. A set of locks joins Lake Muskoka and Lake Rosseau, so much boat and ship traffic in the township passes through, hence its nickname Hub of the Lakes.

== History and economy ==
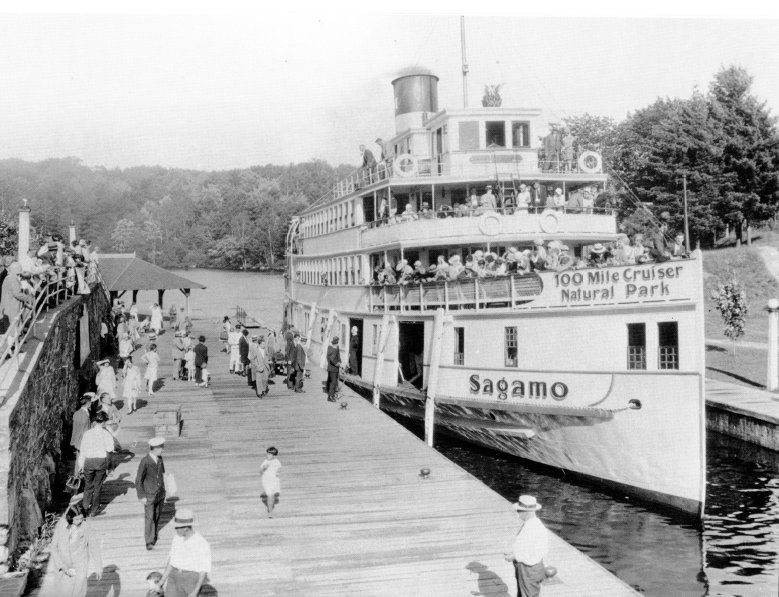
SS Sagamo at Port Carling locks, 1935

The Ojibway settled in the area in the 1850s. They called their settlement Obajewanung or Obogawanung, while Europeans called it Indian Gardens. Before white settlers moved into the newly surveyed Medora Township starting in the 1860s, the Ojibway moved to Parry Sound but continued to summer in Port Carling.

In 1869, Benjamin Hardcastle Johnston established a post office here and called it Port Carling. John Carling, the Ontario Minister of Public Works, was a booster of the locks between the lakes which were completed in 1871. This led to an economic boom fuelled by tourism and logging, resulting in the building of four resorts, two sawmills and three Protestant churches of the 1870s. The Orange Order was active in the area, and few Catholics settled here.

The Port Carling Boat Works Ltd. traces its origins to an enterprise started in 1868 by William J. Johnston. It captured a niche market after his relatives developed the disappearing propeller boat and operated the company under that name for a while.

Port Carling became independent of Medora Township and was incorporated as a village in 1896 (a status it would keep until 1971). As it grew, the locks were widened in 1903 to permit steamship traffic and in 1922 smaller pleasure boat locks were installed. The Port Carling Volunteer Fire Department began in 1912 and got its biggest workout in 1931 when a series of fires ravaged the boat works and much of the downtown.

On January 1, 1971, the Village of Port Carling was amalgamated together with Cardwell Township, Watt Township, parts of Medora and Wood Townships, part of Monck Township, Town of Bala, and the Village of Windermere to form the Township of Muskoka Lakes, as part of the district's reorganization.

== Demographics ==
Historical census populations – Port Carling

Year	Pop.	±%
1901	323	—
1911	378	+17.0%
1921	454	+20.1%
1931	599	+31.9%
1941	509	−15.0%

Year	Pop.	±%
1951	493	−3.1%
1956	510	+3.4%
1961	529	+3.7%
1966	573	+8.3%

Source: Statistics Canada

== Attractions and venues ==
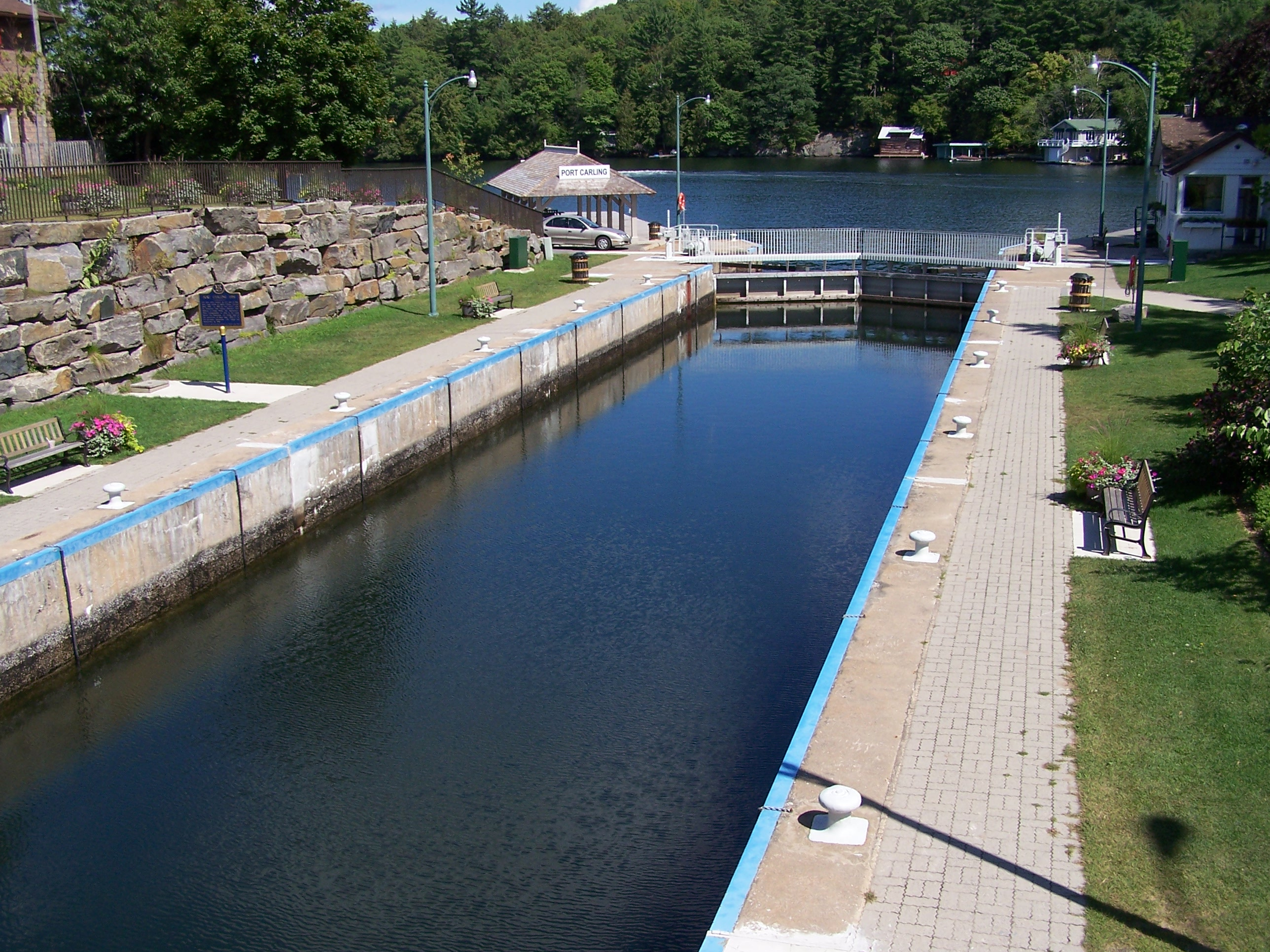
Port Carling "main" locks, 2006

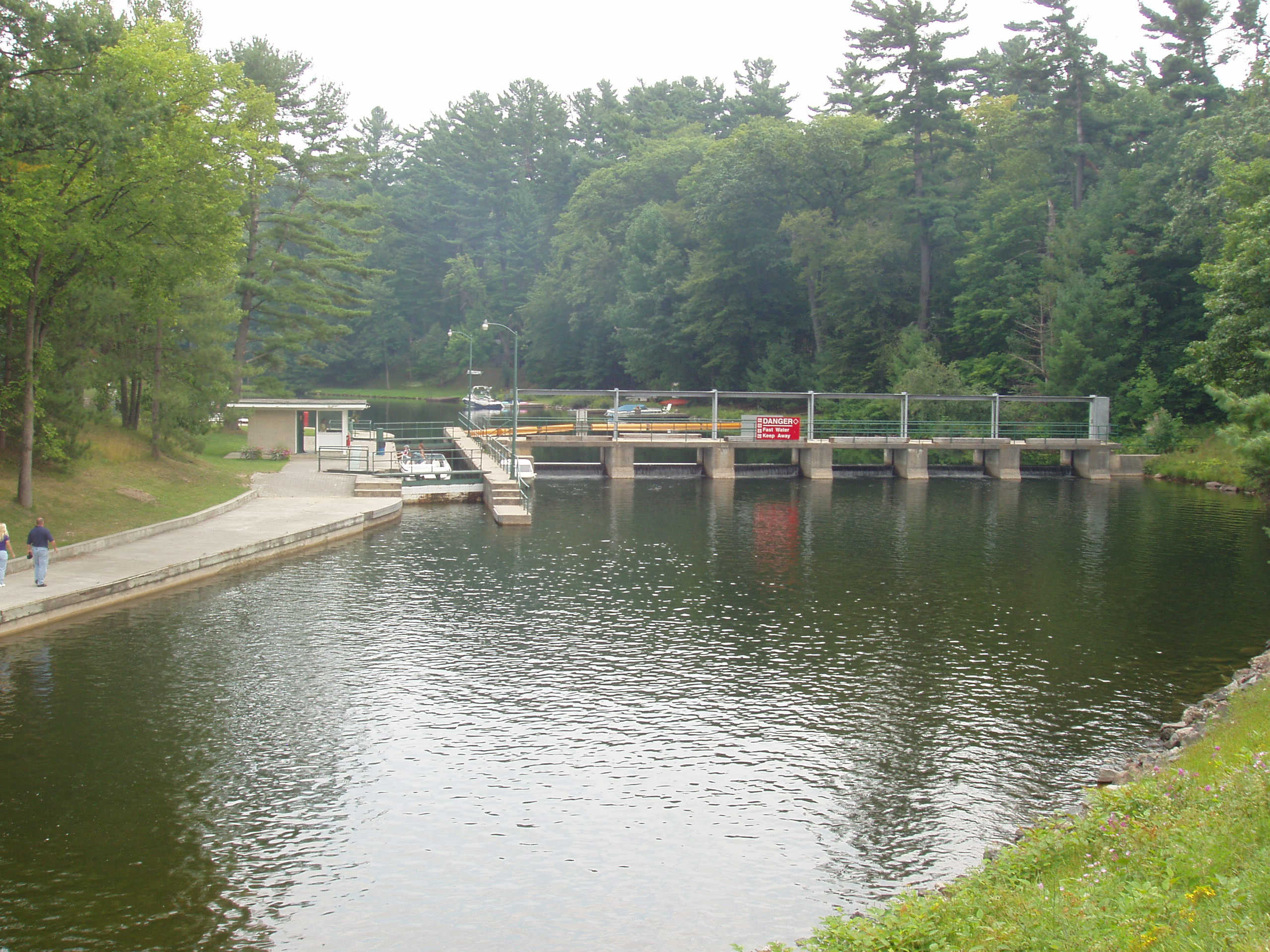
Port Carling small locks, closer view

Besides the town, which maintains much of its older architecture, there are several tourist and cultural sites:

- Muskoka Lakes Museum
- Muskoka Lakes Association Antique Boat Show (every other year)
- Muskoka Lakes Library
- Port Carling Memorial Community Hall
- CrossFit Muskoka Fitness Community

== Transportation ==
The community is directly located on the two-lane Muskoka Road 118, and improvements to Highway 69 now link it to the controlled-access freeway Highway 400 and the sometimes divided Highway 11. This has greatly facilitated its increasing role as a tourist destination from the Toronto area.

== Notable people ==
- Will White, born in Caton, New York Major League Baseball pitcher, brother of Baseball Hall of fame player Deacon White. White lived most of his life in upper New York state, but had a summer home in Port Carling.
- James Bartleman has been Port Carling's most prominent government official outside the community. The part-Ojibway man was a diplomat and lieutenant governor of Ontario. He wrote Out of Muskoka, a personal reminiscence of his upbringing and some of the less savoury aspects of local history.
