= Muskoka Lakes =

- Township (lower-tier)
- Township of Muskoka Lakes
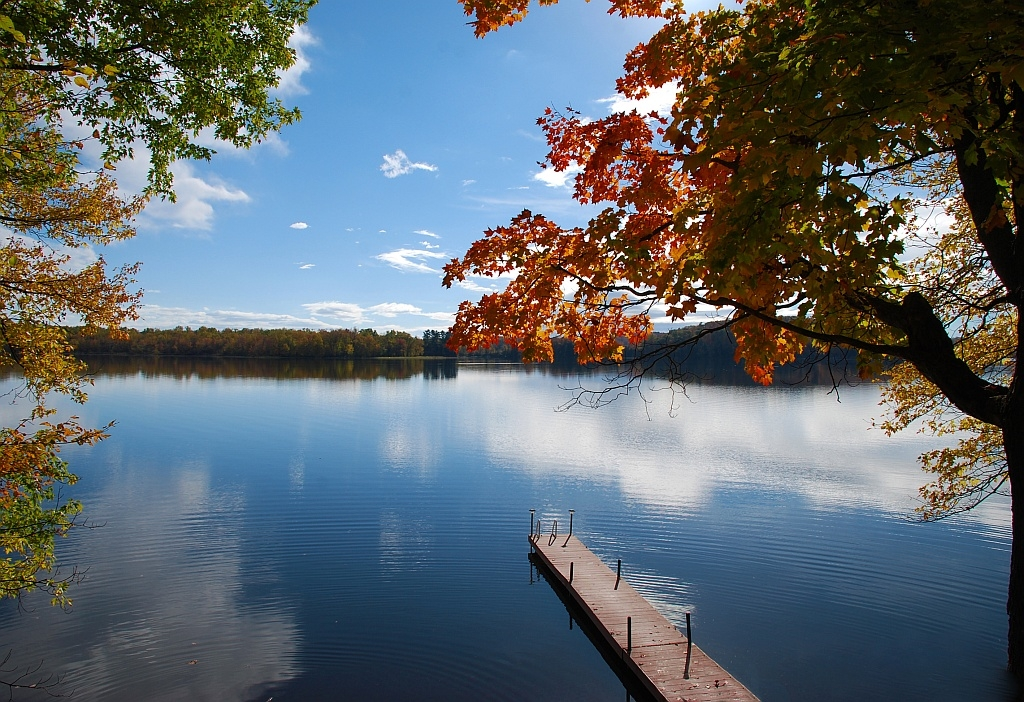
- 3 Mile Lake: typical lake scene in Muskoka Lakes

- Location within Southern Ontario
- Coordinates: 45°07′N 79°35′W
- Country: Canada
- Province: Ontario
- Regional Municipality: Muskoka
- Settled: 1870s
- Incorporated: January 1, 1971

Government
  - Type: Township
  - Mayor: Peter Kelley
  - Governing Body: Muskoka Lakes Township Council
  - MP: Scott Aitchison
  - MPP: Norm Miller (OPC)

Area
  - Land: 774.46 km^{2} (299.02 sq mi)

Population (2021)
  - Total: 7,652
  - Density: 9.9/km^{2} (26/sq mi)
- Time zone: UTC-5 (EST)
  - Summer (DST): UTC-4 (EDT)
- Postal code FSA: P0B
- Area codes: 705, 249
- Website: www.muskokalakes.ca

The Township of Muskoka Lakes is a municipality of the District Municipality of Muskoka, Ontario, Canada. It has a year-round population of 7,652.

The municipal offices are located in Port Carling.

== History ==
The area now covered by the township was opened for settlement and organized in 1870 into the following geographic (and sometime municipal) townships of Watt, Cardwell, Humphrey, Christie, Medora and Wood.

On January 1, 1971, the municipality was established when Cardwell Township, Watt Township, parts of Medora and Wood Townships, and part of Monck Township were merged, along with Town of Bala, Village of Port Carling, and the Village of Windermere, as part of the district's reorganization.

== In popular culture ==
This was both the setting and filming location of the 2024 film My Old Ass starring Maisy Stella and Aubrey Plaza and streaming series Sterling Point which were both created by Megan Park.

== Geography ==
The township is located on the Canadian Shield and the area is marked by outcrops of igneous rock and evergreen trees. Although inland from both Lake Huron's Georgian Bay and Lake Simcoe, the township contains the Muskoka Lakes consisting of Lake Muskoka, Lake Rosseau and Lake Joseph, along with many other smaller lakes.

Protected areas in Muskoka Lakes include Hardy Lake Provincial Park and Torrance Barrens Conservation Area.

=== Communities ===
The township contains the communities of:

- Bala
- Bala Park
- Bardsville
- Barlochan
- Baysville
- Bear Cave
- Beatrice
- Beaumaris
- Bent River
- Brackenrig
- Cedar Village
- Dee Bank
- Dixon's Corners
- Dudley
- Duffy
- Echo Beach
- Ferndale
- Foot's Bay
- Glen Orchard
- Gregory
- Gull Rock
- Hekkla
- Inverness Lodge
- Juddhaven
- Mendora
- Milford Bay
- Minett
- Morinus
- Mortimers Point
- Park Beach
- Port Carling
- Port Keewaydin
- Port Sandfield
- Raymond
- Redwood
- Roderick
- Rossclair
- Rosseau Falls
- Rostrevor
- Shannon Hall
- Sunset Beach
- Thorel House
- Tomelin Bluffs
- Torrance
- Ufford
- Ullswater
- Valley Green Beach
- Walkers Point
- Whiteside
- Willow Beach
- Windermere
- Woodington
- Woodward Station
- Ziska

=== Climate ===
Climate data for Beatrice (1981−2010)
Month	Jan	Feb	Mar	Apr	May	Jun	Jul	Aug	Sep	Oct	Nov	Dec	Year
Record high °C (°F)	11.0 (51.8)	12.5 (54.5)	21.0 (69.8)	31.0 (87.8)	32.0 (89.6)	33.0 (91.4)	33.0 (91.4)	32.5 (90.5)	31.5 (88.7)	27.0 (80.6)	19.0 (66.2)	16.5 (61.7)	33.0 (91.4)
Mean daily maximum °C (°F)	−5.0 (23.0)	−2.5 (27.5)	2.4 (36.3)	10.7 (51.3)	18.1 (64.6)	22.6 (72.7)	24.9 (76.8)	23.8 (74.8)	19.3 (66.7)	12.1 (53.8)	4.7 (40.5)	−1.5 (29.3)	10.8 (51.4)
Daily mean °C (°F)	−10.7 (12.7)	−8.7 (16.3)	−3.8 (25.2)	4.4 (39.9)	11.0 (51.8)	15.8 (60.4)	18.2 (64.8)	17.3 (63.1)	13.1 (55.6)	6.8 (44.2)	0.4 (32.7)	−6.4 (20.5)	4.8 (40.6)
Mean daily minimum °C (°F)	−16.3 (2.7)	−14.9 (5.2)	−10.1 (13.8)	−2.0 (28.4)	3.9 (39.0)	8.9 (48.0)	11.4 (52.5)	10.7 (51.3)	6.8 (44.2)	1.3 (34.3)	−3.9 (25.0)	−11.2 (11.8)	−1.3 (29.7)
Record low °C (°F)	−42.5 (−44.5)	−38.0 (−36.4)	−36.0 (−32.8)	−21.0 (−5.8)	−8.5 (16.7)	−4.0 (24.8)	−0.5 (31.1)	−3.5 (25.7)	−7.0 (19.4)	−11.0 (12.2)	−26.0 (−14.8)	−41.5 (−42.7)	−42.5 (−44.5)
Average precipitation mm (inches)	114.6 (4.51)	82.5 (3.25)	75.2 (2.96)	76.8 (3.02)	97.9 (3.85)	87.7 (3.45)	94.3 (3.71)	87.7 (3.45)	113.6 (4.47)	118.4 (4.66)	124.0 (4.88)	125.0 (4.92)	1,197.7 (47.15)
Average rainfall mm (inches)	28.3 (1.11)	22.9 (0.90)	39.6 (1.56)	66.4 (2.61)	97.7 (3.85)	87.7 (3.45)	94.3 (3.71)	87.7 (3.45)	113.6 (4.47)	114.1 (4.49)	87.3 (3.44)	37.0 (1.46)	876.7 (34.52)
Average snowfall cm (inches)	86.4 (34.0)	59.6 (23.5)	35.6 (14.0)	10.4 (4.1)	0.2 (0.1)	0.0 (0.0)	0.0 (0.0)	0.0 (0.0)	0.0 (0.0)	4.3 (1.7)	36.6 (14.4)	88.0 (34.6)	321.1 (126.4)
Average precipitation days (≥ 0.2 mm)	17.4	13.5	12.0	12.4	13.8	13.3	11.9	12.9	14.4	17.0	16.8	17.3	172.6
Average rainy days (≥ 0.2 mm)	3.6	3.4	5.9	10.7	13.8	13.3	11.9	12.9	14.4	16.4	11.9	5.4	123.4
Average snowy days (≥ 0.2 cm)	15.2	11.3	7.4	2.7	0.08	0.0	0.0	0.0	0.0	1.3	5.9	13.4	57.2
Source: Environment Canada

== Demographics ==
In the 2021 Census of Population conducted by Statistics Canada, Muskoka Lakes had a population of 7,652 living in 3,529 of its 9,443 total private dwellings, a change of 16.2% from its 2016 population of 6,588. With a land area of 774.46 km^{2} (299.02 sq mi), it had a population density of 9.9/km^{2} (25.6/sq mi) in 2021.

Canada census – Muskoka Lakes community profile

	2021	2016	2011
Population	7,652 (+16.2% from 2016)	6588 (-1.8% from 2011)	6707 (3.7% from 2006)
Land area	774.46 km^{2} (299.02 sq mi)	794.26 km^{2} (306.67 sq mi)	794.48 km^{2} (306.75 sq mi)
Population density	9.9/km^{2} (26/sq mi)	8.3/km^{2} (21/sq mi)	8.4/km^{2} (22/sq mi)
Median age	57.2 (M: 56.8, F: 57.2)	54.7 (M: 54.3, F: 5.2)
Private dwellings	9,443 (total) 3,529 (occupied)	9343 (total)	9723 (total)
Median household income	$89,000

References: 2021 2016 2011

Historical census populations – Muskoka Lakes

Year	Pop.	±%
1971	4,170	—
1976	4,813	+15.4%
1981	4,968	+3.2%
1986	4,948	−0.4%
1991	5,498	+11.1%
1996	6,061	+10.2%

Year	Pop.	±%
2001	6,042	−0.3%
2006	6,467	+7.0%
2011	6,707	+3.7%
2016	6,588	−1.8%
2021	7,652	+16.2%

2011 Population figure based on revised count. Population counts are not adjusted for boundary changes.
Source: Statistics Canada

== Economy ==
Timber was initially the greatest economic attraction for the region. The soil is poor and rocky and consequently is not especially suited to agriculture.

As the resource industries dried up, the area soon embraced tourism as its economic base because of its proximity to Toronto and the rest of Southern Ontario. For many Ontarians, this is the centre of cottage country.

The Muskoka Lakes Township Public Libraries offers research, literature, and cultural resources to local residents. The libraries consist of the Norma and Miller Alloway Muskoka Lakes Library main branch in the town of Port Carling, and three small branches housed in the community centres of Bala, Milford Bay, and Walker's Point.

== Government ==
The Township of Muskoka Lakes is governed by an elected Town Council consisting of the Mayor, Peter Kelly, District Councillors and Councillors representing each of the town's three wards. In addition, three Regional Councillors each represent a ward each. The Mayor and Councillors sit on the Muskoka County Council.

== Notable people ==
- James Bartleman, politician and diplomat
- Viola R. MacMillan, prospector and miner
- John Wilson McConnell, sugar refiner, newspaper publisher, humanitarian and philanthropist

== See also ==
- List of townships in Ontario
