= Lake Joseph =

Lake in Ontario, Canada

Lake Joseph (Ontario)
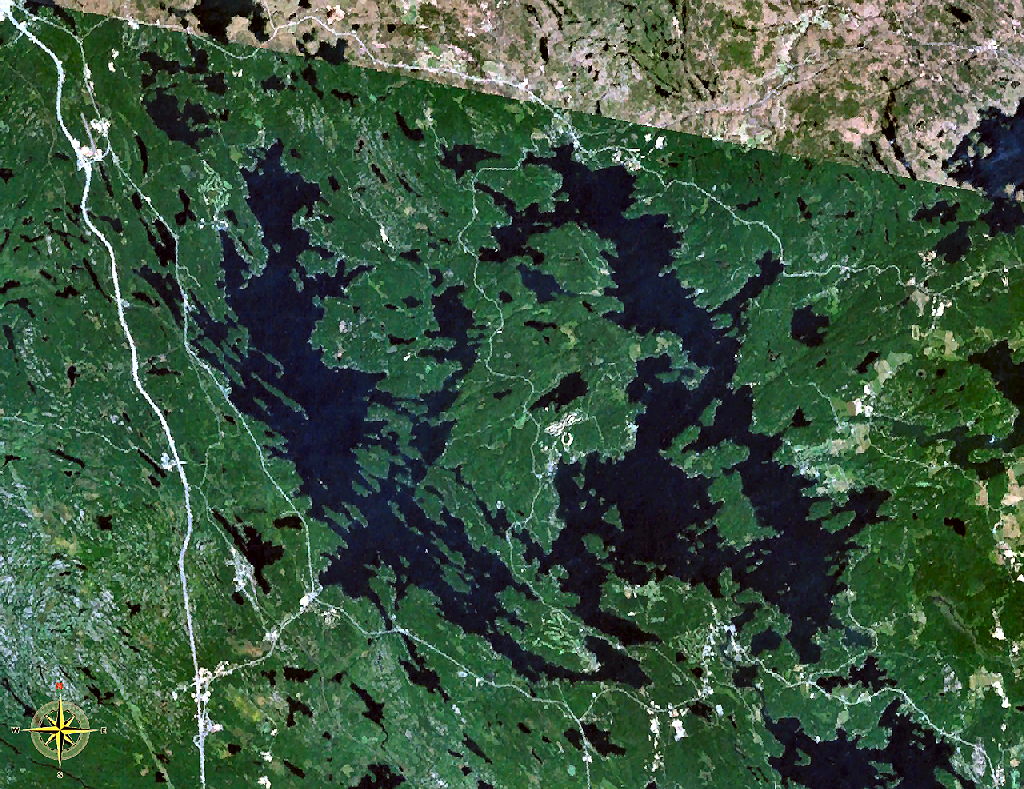
- Lake Joseph to the west (left) of Lake Rosseau

- Location within Ontario
- Coordinates: 45°11′N 79°43′W
- Surface elevation: 227 m (745 ft)
- Islands: Fraser Island, Blueberry Island, Island K, Emerald Island, Burnt Island, Round Island, Turtle Island, Dahmawah Island, Wegamind Island, Playfair Island, Gitchie Island, Waneshing Island, Bungay Island, Yoho Island, Birch Island, Rosebud Island, Peggy Island, Buck Island, Little Round Island, Cliff Island, Chief's Island, Kenesha Island, Strawberry Island, Bunny Island, Seven Pines Island, Eagle Island, Lilborne Island, Birch Island, Bottle Island, Chaplain Island, Loon Island, Little Loon Island, Fairy Island, Governors Island, Cameron Island, Little Chiefs Island, Home Island, Christmas Island, Elsinore Island, Harry Island, Lyford Island, Princess Island, Arma Island, Laurie Island, Sullivan Island, Caniff Island, Fawn Island, Baldy Island, Foster Island, Burgess Island, Sunshine Island, Ermananda Island, Leonard Island, Star Island, Black Forest Island, St. Helens Island, Bluff Island, Keith Island, Sunbeam Island, Coney Island, Sunset Island, Schooner Island, Anchor Island, Perch Island, Bass Island, Pickerel Island, Bell Island, Sugarloaf Island, Charity Island, Faith Island, Silver Birches Island, Badgerow Island, Geoffrey Island, Reef Island, Crane Island, Helen Island

Lake Joseph is located in Seguin Township, Ontario. Cottage development in the Muskoka region began on the northern islands of Lake Joseph in the 1870's but quickly spread to other sections of all three of the larger Muskoka lakes. Lake Joseph is connected to Lake Rosseau through the narrows at Port Sandfield and the Joseph River. William Robinson, a member of the House of Assembly for Upper Canada (1830-1840) and later Commissioner of Public Works named Lake Joseph and neighbouring Lake Rosseau after his friend Joseph Rousseau, the father of a fur trader in the area.

== History ==
The Muskoka region is located within the Canadian Shield and features bedrock exposures and a veneer of glacially- derived sandy substrate. The area was covered by proglacial Lake Algonquin (a precursor to Lake Huron) following glacial recession around 10,000 years ago. The region is the traditional territory of the Anishinaabeg, which includes the Ojibwe, Odawa, and Potawatomi Nations, collectively known as the Three Fires Confederacy, as well as the Wendat and the Haudenosaunee Nations. Southern portions of Muskoka were the traditional territory of the Wendat between AD 1300 and 1650. The region is covered by the J. Collins land purchase of 1785, the Robinson-Huron Treaty of 1850 and the Williams Treaties of 1923.

The Free Grants and Homestead Act passed in 1868 was part of an attempt by the new Ontario provincial government to attract European immigration to create an agricultural society in Muskoka, however the prospects of agricultural development on the Canadian Shield were woefully overestimated.

In the late nineteenth century road, rail and steamboat transportation infrastructure originally developed to support agriculture and forestry was repurposed to support tourism which became an important economic driver for Lake Joseph and the region.

== Lake Front Resident Advocacy Group ==
There are many community groups based on Lake Joseph. The largest of these is the Muskoka Lakes Association (MLA). The MLA was founded in 1894 to represent the interests of lakeshore residents on Lakes Rosseau, Joseph and Muskoka and many smaller surrounding lakes. The Lake Joseph North Association was established in 1996 to represent shoreline residents at the north end of the lake, as well as those on Portage Lake.

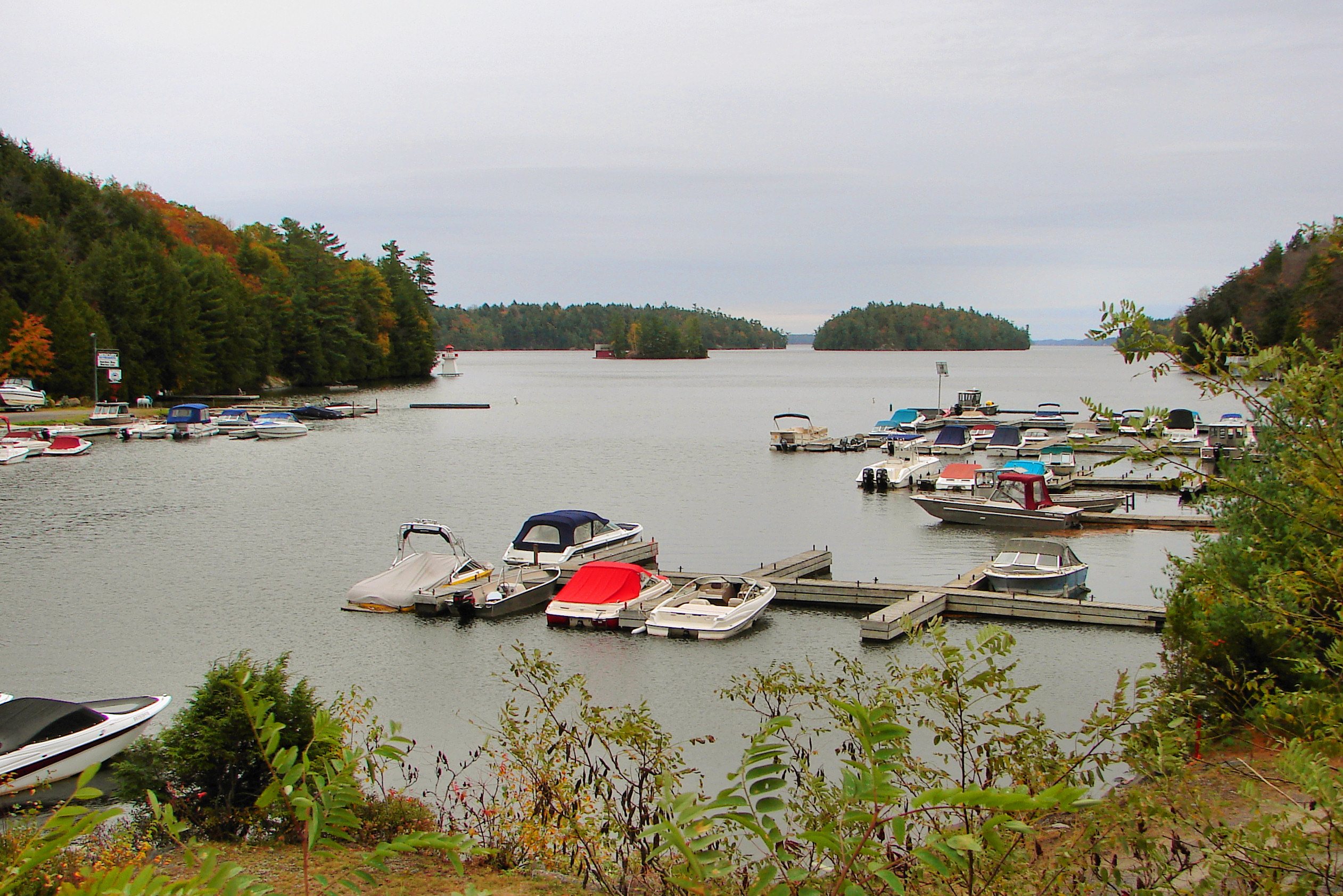
Marina at Gordon Bay.

== See also ==
- List of lakes in Ontario
- Camp Ekon
