= Lake Rosseau =

Lake in Central Ontario, Canada

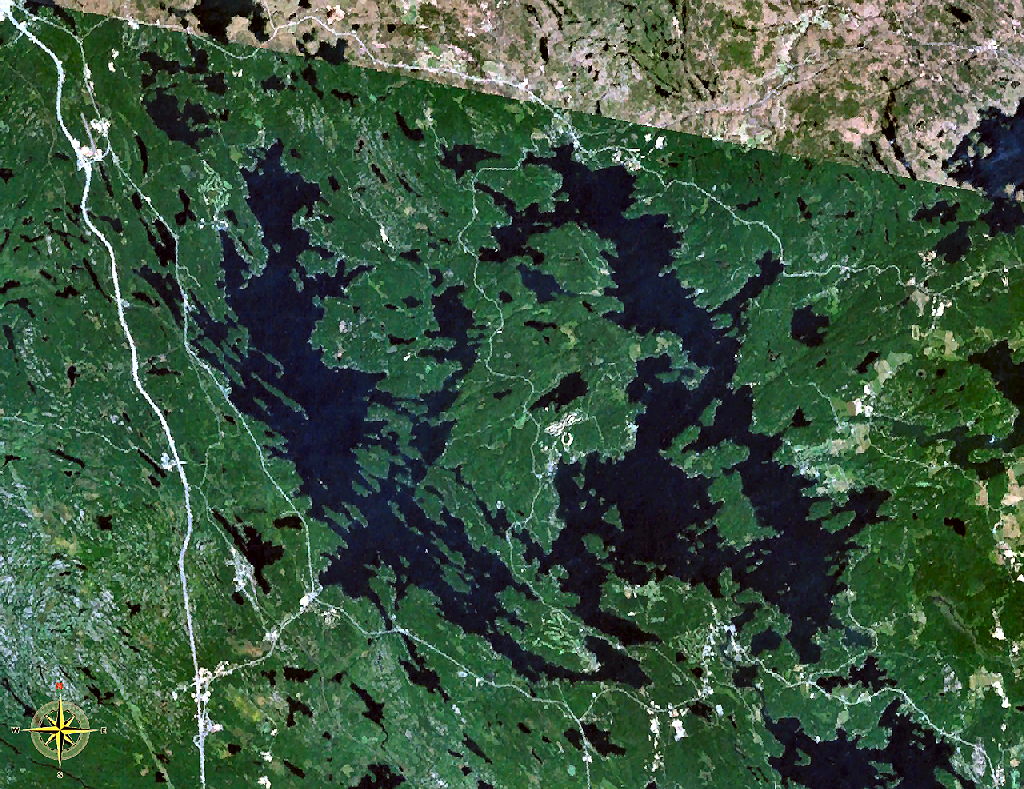
- Lake Rosseau to the east (right) of Lake Joseph

- Location within Ontario
- Location: Muskoka, Ontario
- Coordinates: 45°10′N 79°36′W
- Primary outflows: Indian River
- Basin countries: Canada
- Max. length: 18 km (11 mi)
- Max. width: 8.5 km (5.3 mi)
- Surface elevation: 227 m (745 ft)
- Islands: Tobin; 60+ smaller
- Settlements: Port Carling, Minett, Windermere, and Rosseau

Lake Rosseau is located in Ontario, Canada, about 200 km (120 mi) north of Toronto. The south end of the lake is in the Township of Muskoka Lakes, and the north end is in Seguin Township. The lake is surrounded by many cottages, some dating back to the late 19th century.

The village of Rosseau is located at the northern tip of Lake Rosseau and is the location of one of the original Ontario summer resorts which brought exposure to the area. Pratts Point and Rosseau House were well known and although the hotel was destroyed long ago, the vista and scenery remain. Windermere House is a resort located at Lake Rosseau.

== Geography ==
Lake Rosseau is connected to Lake Joseph through the narrows at Port Sandfield and the Joseph River. The lake is also connected to Lake Muskoka by the Indian River and the lock system at Port Carling.

=== Communities ===
Communities on Lake Rosseau include Port Carling, Minett, Windermere, Rosseau and Port Sandfield.

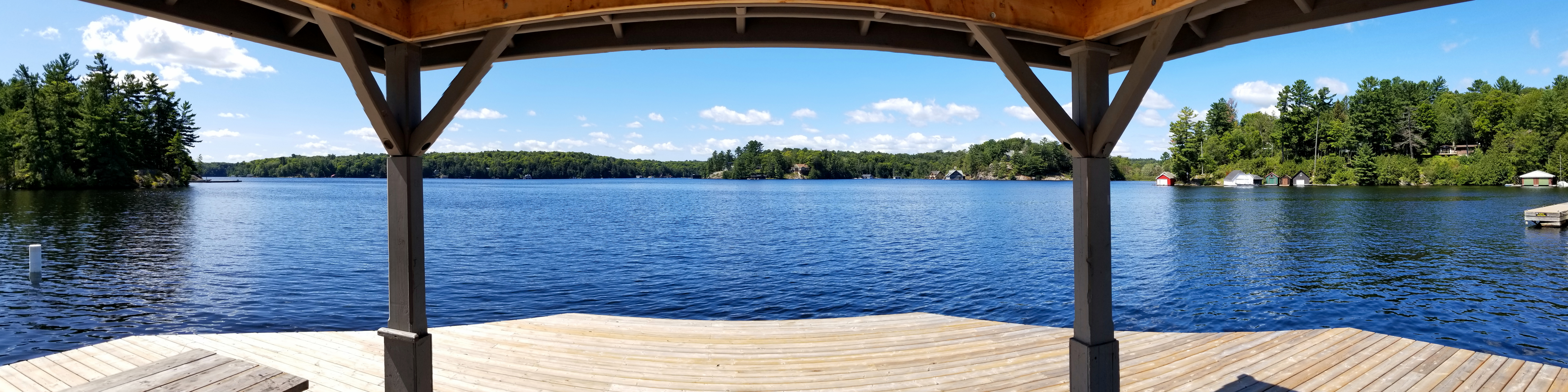
Lake Rosseau at Rosseau Waterfront Park

== Community organizations ==
There are many community groups based on Lake Rosseau. The largest of these is the Muskoka Lakes Association.

== Notable people ==
Many notable people have owned cottages on the lake, including Goldie Hawn, Ted Rogers, William Eli Sanford, Martin Short, Lillian Massey Treble and Steve Yzerman. The President of the United States, Woodrow Wilson (1913–1921), frequently holidayed on Lake Rosseau, and eventually bought Formosa Island and Royal Muskoka Hotel (in 1901). There is a curious story that in 1914 he signed the register of the Bala Bay Inn after the outbreak of World War I; however, there is no official record of the president being in Canada at that time.

== See also ==
- List of lakes in Ontario
