= Wawa Hotel =

Coordinates: 45.224319°N 79.025561°W

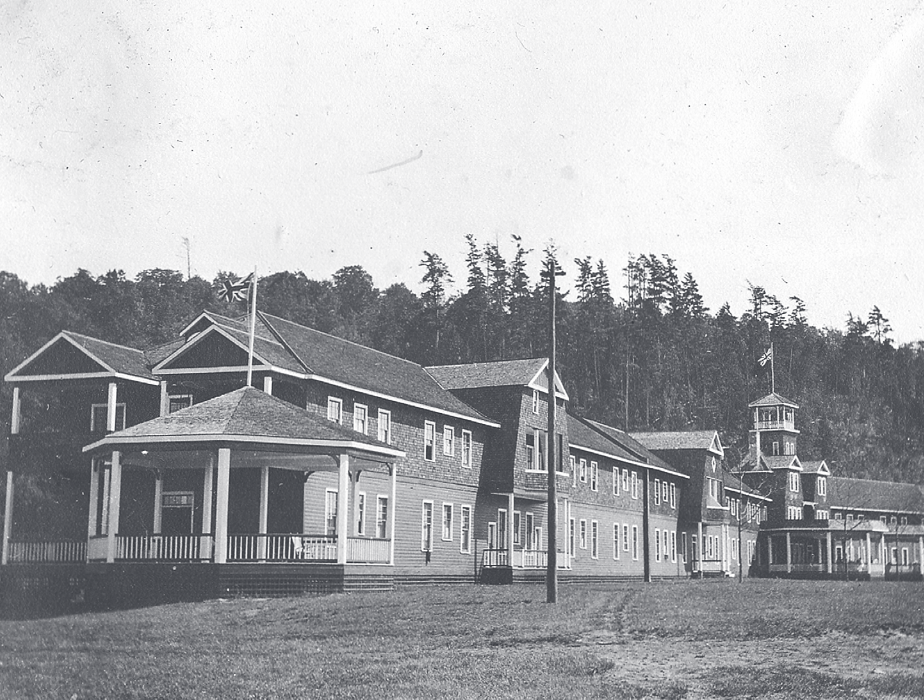

General information
- Location: Lake of Bays, Ontario
- Opened: August 1908
- Destroyed: 19 August 1923

Design and construction
- Architect: George Wallace Gouinlock

The Wawa Hotel was a large summer resort hotel located at Norway Point on Lake of Bays, in Ontario, Canada. Constructed in 1908, it was entirely destroyed by a fire on August 19, 1923. The name "Wawa" is a native Canadian word for "wild goose".

== History ==
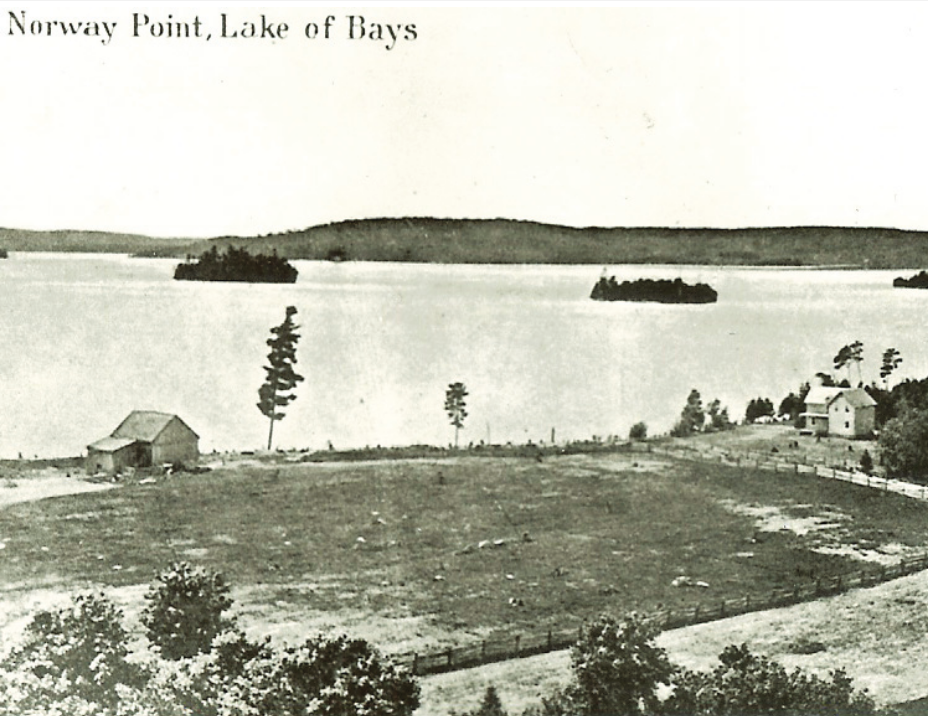
A view of Norway Point on Lake of Bays, taken before the 1908 construction of the Wawa Hotel. The settlement in the area was called Gordon's Corners at the time.

The land on which the Wawa was later built was originally thickly wooded; First Nations groups knew and likely camped in the area, as evidenced by an arrowhead found on the point itself. In the late 1870s there was already a small community with a church, a schoolhouse and a post office in the area. Around this time, the site of the later Wawa Hotel was cleared and settled by John Wilson Robertson, a coal merchant from Edinburgh, and his family. As other farmers in the region also discovered, the Robertsons found the land to be challenging to work, as the soil consisted primarily of sand with many stones and little humus.

By the turn of the 20th century, the main economy of the area had begun to transition from farming to tourism. With steamboats and the Portage Railway of the Huntsville and Lake of Bays Transportation Company connecting Lake of Bays to the Grand Trunk Railway, access from the larger cities of southern Ontario became much easier. As this transition continued, more and more hotels and private cottages continued to spring up. Mrs. Elizabeth Robertson (née Forest) hosted the first guests in her house at the future site of the Wawa around this time, and continued to do so until the land was purchased from her by the Canadian Railway News Company in order to build the Wawa.

== Description ==
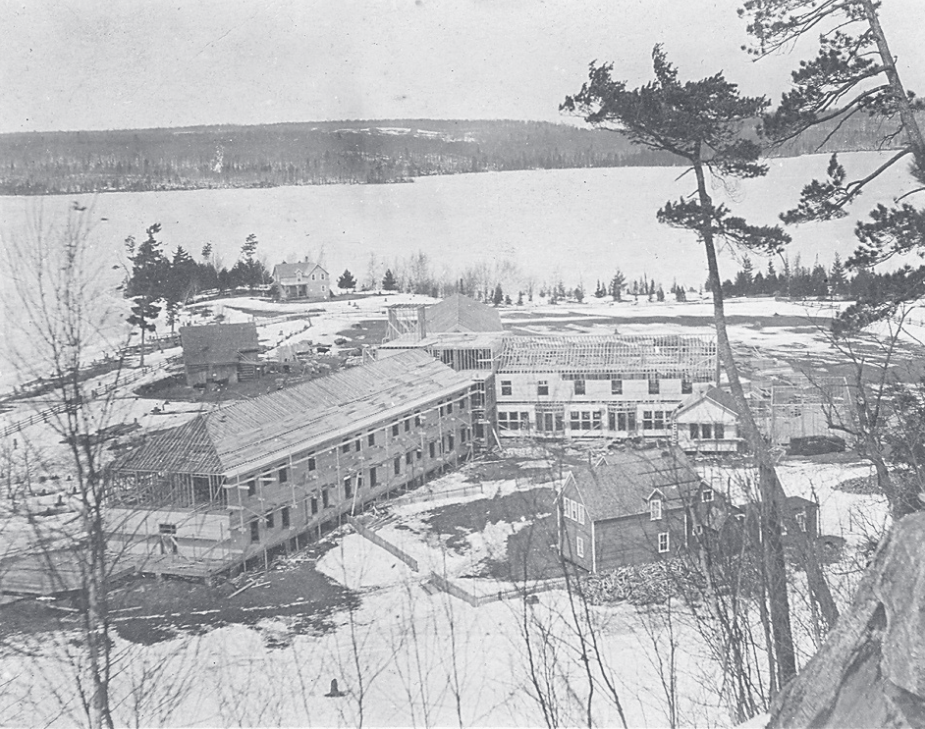
The Wawa Hotel under Construction, as seen from the cliff behind Norway Point.

Built in 1908, the Wawa hotel was a wooden structure consisting of a three-story centre block flanked by a pair of two story wings. The centre block was capped by a five-story tower featuring a powerful electric searchlight (a novelty at the time) and housed the main rotunda and a dining room with capacity for 300 people. The wings had rooms on two floors, with the entire hotel having a total 153 rooms. The accommodations were considered luxurious at the time, with hot and cold running water in every room, electric light throughout the hotel, and many rooms featuring en suite bathrooms. The rooms, the majority of which were 4.3 m x 4.9 m (14 feet x 16 feet), were said to be larger than average for similar summer hotels. Numerous activities were available to the guests, such as sailing, canoeing, swimming, tennis, baseball, football, bowls and quoits.

== Location ==
The Wawa Hotel was situated on a piece of property including and extending out to the south of Norway Point, approximately midway between the towns of Baysville and Dorset. The property is flat, with a broad, sandy beach with a western exposure extending along its entire length. A 46 m (150 foot) cliff rises behind the property, upon which foundations for what was likely a water tank can still be found.

Access to the Wawa was difficult by modern standards, with a trip from Toronto taking 8.5 hours in 1919. The trip involved taking a train to Huntsville, a steamer to the portage railway between Peninsula Lake and Lake of Bays, and then a second steamer from there to the Wawa dock. For comparison, the same trip today takes approximately 2.5 hours by car.

== Destruction ==
On the night of August 19th, 1923, fire broke out in the centre block, originating either in the elevator shaft or the adjacent baggage room. It quickly spread throughout the wooden structure, and reduced it to ashes in under half an hour. 8 people, all women, were killed in the immediate course of the blaze, with a 9th woman dying four days later as a result of her injuries, Several of the women who died were maids, sleeping in the bedrooms in the central tower, directly above where the flames originated. Inquiries and investigations held after the fire revealed that there had been no fire alarm installed in the building, no signed escape routes and only inadequate fire-fighting equipment. In addition to this, the fire hydrants in the building were rendered useless because the water supply had been shut off at the main valve in the kitchen. Fire escapes from upper floor rooms mainly consisted of ropes, and even these were not provided in the rooms of the centre tower.

== Legacy ==
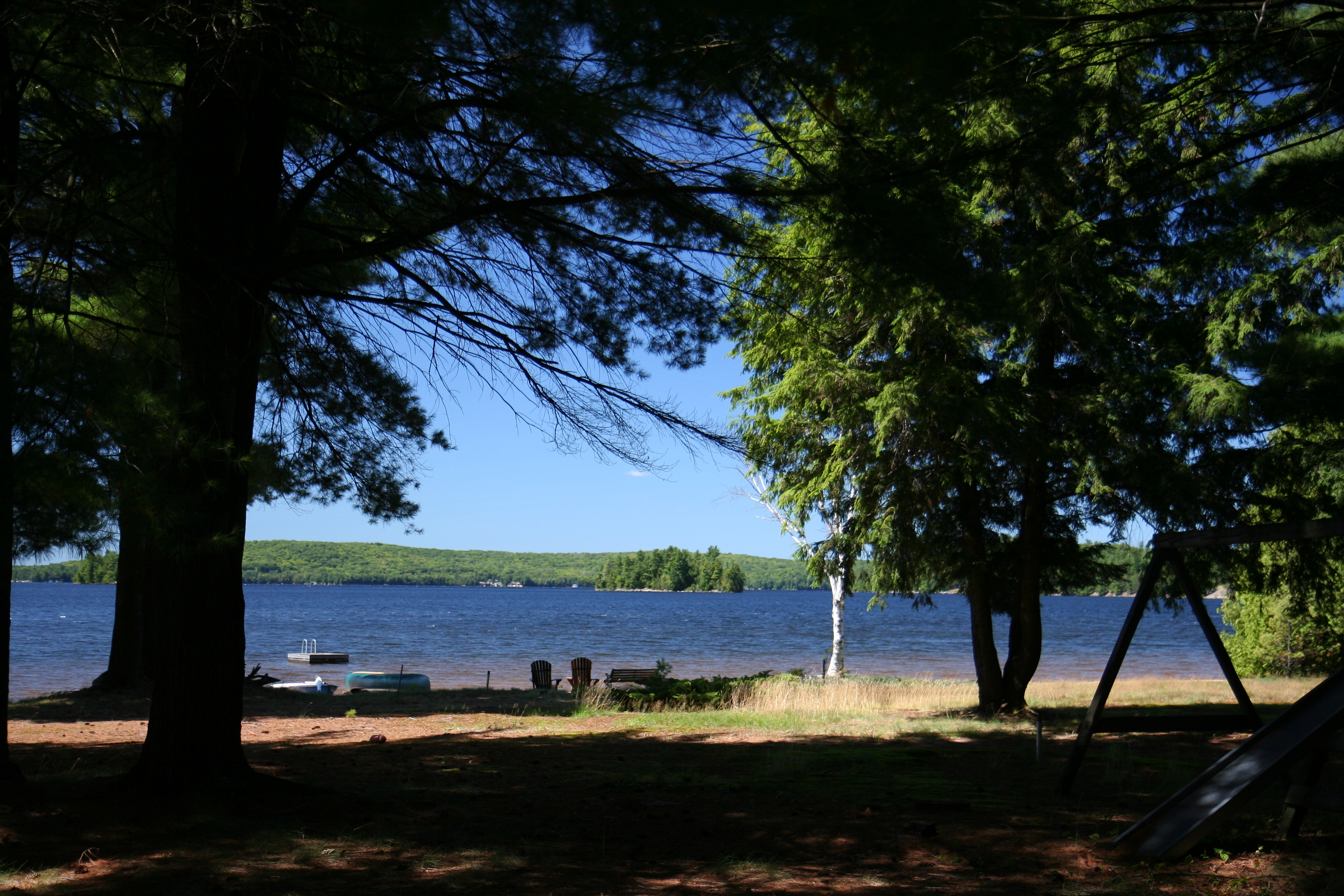
A view of Lake of Bays as seen from the former property of the Wawa Hotel in 2009

The destruction of the Wawa by fire, like many similar hotels of the era, led to an increased emphasis being placed on fire safety in newer establishments. The next large hotel to be built on Lake of Bays, the Bigwin Inn, advertised itself as being fireproof, with many of its buildings being built of stone and concrete, instead of the otherwise ubiquitous wood. In addition to this, the Bigwin Inn comprised several separate buildings in order to prevent the spread of fire, a measure which was also recommended by a jury in the wake of the Wawa fire.

After the fire, C.O. Shaw, owner of the Bigwin Inn, purchased the land and then sold it to private individuals, including Frank Leslie (later owner of the Bigwin Inn) and James Watson Bain, son of James Bain, the first chief librarian of the Toronto Public Library. The Leslie cottage is now owned by Graeme Ferguson. One of only two surviving Wawa structures still stands on this property, a white gazebo set on Norway Point. The other structure which survived the fire is the purser's cabin from the end of the Wawa dock, which now serves as a railway station on the restored portage railway. The cribs from the original Wawa dock are still in place, but now present a slight navigational hazard as they are entirely underwater.
