= Boyne River (Muskoka District) =

- Location of the mouth of the Boyne River in southern Ontario

Location
- Country: Canada
- Province: Ontario
- Region: Central Ontario
- District Municipality: Muskoka
- Municipality: Lake of Bays

Physical characteristics
- Source: Fowler Lake (Muskoka District)
  - coordinates: 45°24′19″N 79°02′00″W
  - elevation: 403 m (1,322 ft)
- Mouth: Lake of Bays
  - coordinates: 45°19′47″N 79°01′00″W
  - elevation: 315 m (1,033 ft)

Basin features
- River system: Great Lakes Basin
- Tributaries
  - left: Sixteen Mile Creek

The Boyne River is a river in the municipality of Lake of Bays, District Municipality of Muskoka in Central Ontario, Canada. It is part of the Great Lakes Basin, and flows from Fowler Lake to its mouth at Dwight Bay on the Lake of Bays near the community of Dwight on Ontario Highway 60. The Lake of Bays flows via the Muskoka River, then the Moon River and Musquash River to Georgian Bay on Lake Huron.

== Tributaries ==
- Sixteen Mile Creek (left)

== Sources ==
- Map 5 (PDF) (Map). 1 : 700,000. Official road map of Ontario. Ministry of Transportation of Ontario. 2010-01-01.
- Restructured municipalities - Ontario map #5 (Map). Restructuring Maps of Ontario. Ontario Ministry of Municipal Affairs and Housing. 2006. Archived from the original on 2020-05-11.
