= Sixteen Mile Creek (Muskoka District) =

Stream in Lake of Bays in Central Ontario, Canada

- Location of the mouth of Sixteen Mile Creek in southern Ontario

Location
- Country: Canada
- Province: Ontario
- Region: Central Ontario
- District Municipality: Muskoka
- Municipality: Lake of Bays

Physical characteristics
- Source: Hickory Lake
  - coordinates: 45°24′22″N 78°59′43″W
  - elevation: 418 m (1,371 ft)
- Mouth: Boyne River
  - coordinates: 45°20′11″N 79°00′57″W
  - elevation: 320 m (1,050 ft)

Basin features
- River system: Great Lakes Basin

Sixteen Mile Creek is a stream in the municipality of Lake of Bays, District Municipality of Muskoka in Central Ontario, Canada. It is part of the Great Lakes Basin and flows from Hickory Lake to its mouth at the Boyne River. The Boyne River flows to the Lake of Bays, then via the Muskoka River, and the Moon River and Musquash River to Georgian Bay on Lake Huron.

== Tributaries ==
- Spaniel Creek (left)

== Sources ==
- Map 5 (PDF) (Map). 1 : 700,000. Official road map of Ontario. Ministry of Transportation of Ontario. 2010-01-01.
- Restructured municipalities - Ontario map #5 (Map). Restructuring Maps of Ontario. Ontario Ministry of Municipal Affairs and Housing. 2006.
