= Oxtongue River =

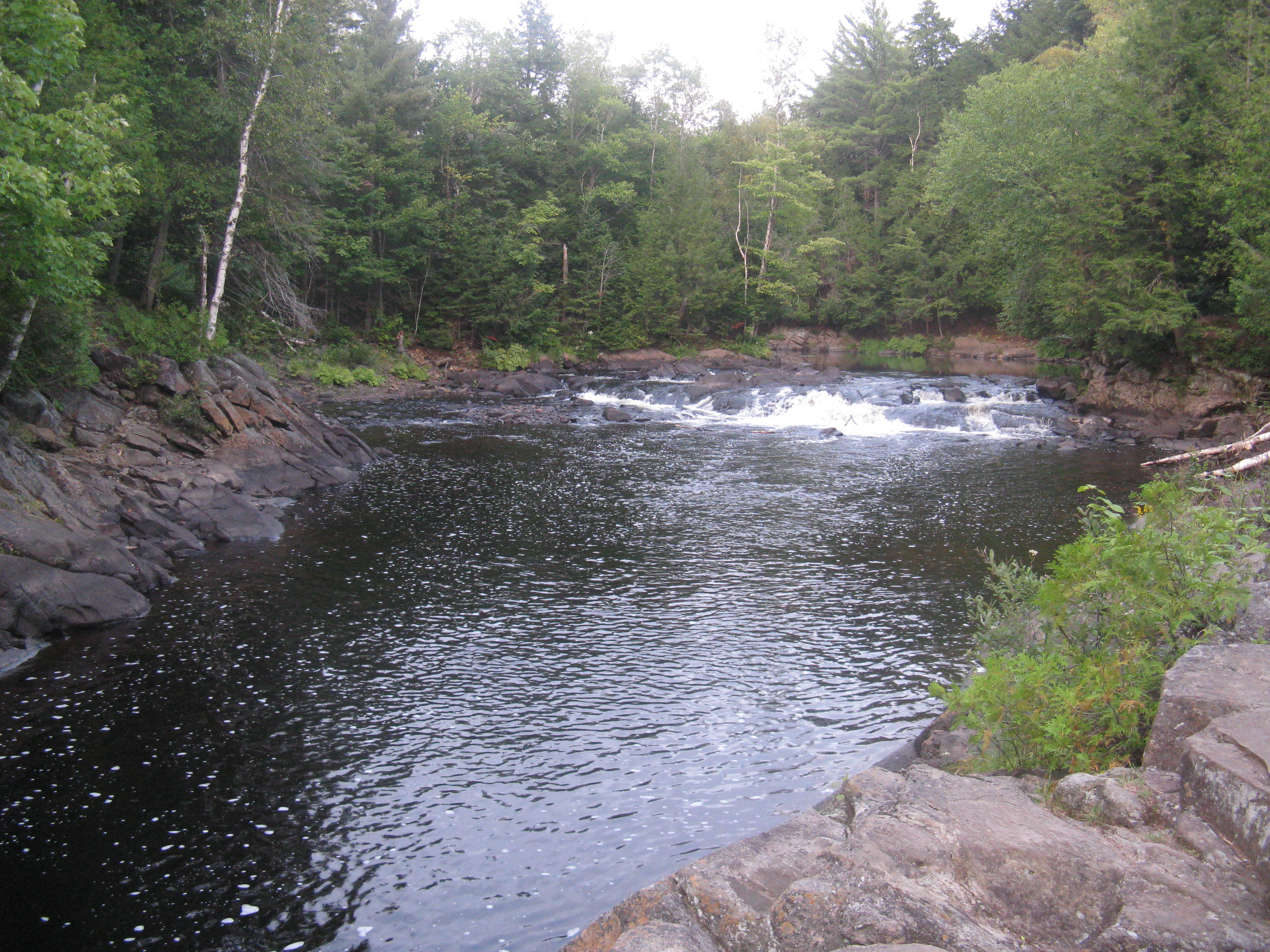

- Location within Southern Ontario

Location
- Country: Canada
- Province: Ontario
- Districts: Nipissing, Muskoka

Physical characteristics
- Source: Joe Lake
  - location: Unorg. South Nipissing
  - coordinates: 45°34′24″N 78°43′07″W
  - elevation: 421 m (1,381 ft)
- Mouth: Dwight Bay, Lake of Bays
  - location: Dwight
  - coordinates: 45°19′11″N 79°00′39″W
  - elevation: 315 m (1,033 ft)
- Length: 42 km (26 mi)
- Basin size: 607.86 km^{2} (234.70 sq mi)
- Discharge
  - average: 10.9 m^{3}/s (380 cu ft/s)
  - minimum: 2.84 m^{3}/s (100 cu ft/s)
  - maximum: 26.5 m^{3}/s (940 cu ft/s)

Basin features
- Tributaries
  - right: Little Oxtongue River
- Waterbodies: Canoe, Bonito, Tea, Oxtongue Lakes
- Waterfalls: Ragged Falls, High Falls, Marsh's Falls

The Oxtongue River is a river in Nipissing and Muskoka Districts, Ontario, Canada. It is a tributary of the Muskoka River via Lake of Bays, flowing in a mostly south-westerly direction through undisturbed mixed forest that is home to many native mammal species.

== Geography ==
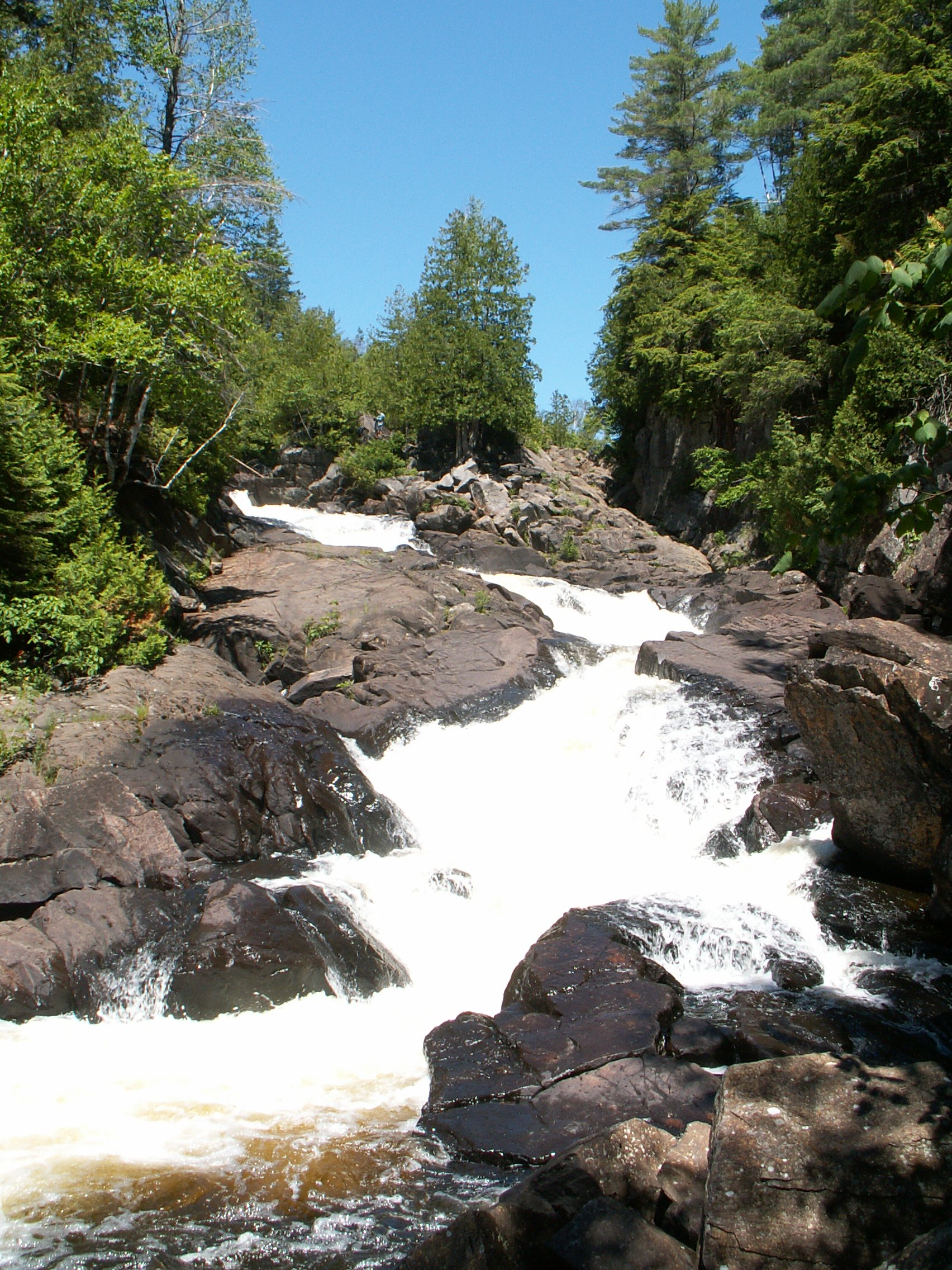
Ragged Falls

The Oxtongue River is a channel of a former spillway that formed when glacial waters from the Algonquin Highlands melted and flowed to proglacial Lake Algonquin.

The Oxtongue River springs inside Algonquin Provincial Park. After this park, the river enters the Oxtongue River-Ragged Falls Provincial Park, where it flows over 2 major waterfalls, the High Falls and Ragged Falls. Then it is crossed by Highway 60 and enters Oxtongue Lake. After the bridge of Highway 35, there is Marsh's Falls, protected in the 69 ha (170 acres) Marsh's Falls Nature Reserve. From there, the lower Oxtongue River meanders for 4.5 km (2.8 mi) to its mouth at Dwight Bay of Lake of Bays.

Over the period 1981 to 2022, the Oxtongue River has a mean flow of 10.9 cubic metres per second (380 cu ft/s). Mean minimal flow is 2.84 cubic metres per second (100 cu ft/s) and mean maximum flow is 26.5 cubic metres per second (940 cu ft/s). Record maximum flow was 49.2 cubic metres per second (1,740 cu ft/s) in April 2019, while record minimum flow was 0.711 cubic metres per second (25.1 cu ft/s) in July 1991. Its discharge is affected by the Tea Lake Dam, about 35 kilometres (22 mi) upstream.

The Oxtongue River subwatershed, dominated by mixed forest, is home to moose, bear, and other mammal species. The coniferous forest in the Oxtongue River valley is inhabited by various bird species, such as black-backed woodpecker, winter wren, northern saw-whet owl, boreal chickadee, spruce grouse, and various warbler species (including northern parula).

The river is controlled by four dams, at Burnt Island, Joe Lake, Tea Lake, and Ragged Lake. Its basin is almost entirely undeveloped, consisting of 28% Crown land and 69% protected in various provincial parks and conservation areas. The river valley has been designated as a Muskoka Heritage Area.

== History ==
Historically, it was a canoe route for indigenous people.

In 1837, surveyor and cartographer David Thompson traveled across the Lake of Bays and up the Oxtongue River to reach Canoe Lake, later traveling down the Madawaska River.

The Canadian painter Tom Thomson and the Group of Seven painted landscapes along the river. In the late 19th century, the Gilmour Lumber Company used the river for log driving of timber from the Canoe Lake area to their mill in Trenton via the Muskoka and Trent River systems.

Today, the Oxtongue River is used for recreational canoeing.

== Oxtongue River-Ragged Falls Provincial Park ==
Oxtongue River-Ragged Falls Provincial Park
- IUCN category II (national park)
- Interactive map of Oxtongue River-Ragged Falls Provincial Park
- Location: District Municipality of Muskoka
- Coordinates: 45°24′43″N 78°53′40″W
- Area: 507 ha (1,250 acres)
- Designation: Waterway
- Established: 1985
- Visitors: 5,553 (in 2022)
- Governing body: Ontario Parks
- Website: ontarioparks.ca/park/oxtongueriverraggedfalls

The Oxtongue River-Ragged Falls Provincial Park is about 35 kilometres (22 mi) east of Huntsville, Ontario, protecting a 6.7 kilometres (4.2 mi) long section of the Oxtongue River from the west boundary of Algonquin Provincial Park to Highway 60.

The park includes two notable waterfalls:

- Ragged Falls, with a vertical drop of 25 m (82 ft) over a distance of 200 m (660 ft). This waterfall, considered "one of the top 10 waterfalls in Ontario", is easily accessible with short hiking trails along the river.
- High Falls, with a vertical drop of 10 m (33 ft) over a distance of 10 m (33 ft).

The area has been recognized for its recreational value since the 1950s. In 1953 and 1959, the Crown land surrounding Ragged Falls was made into a Crown Reserve. In the 1960s, it was considered to add this area to the perimeter recreation system program of Algonquin Provincial Park. In 1985, the park was officially created with an original area of 382 hectares (940 acres), and enlarged in 1995 to 507 hectares (1,250 acres) by the addition of 125 hectares (310 acres) around the Oxtongue River Bog Forest.

The Oxtongue River-Ragged Falls Provincial Park is an operating park, meaning that permits are needed for day use. Amenities include parking lot, trails, and washroom. Permitted activities are boating, canoeing, hiking, snowshoeing, hunting, and fishing.
