= Huntsville and Lake of Bays Transportation Company =

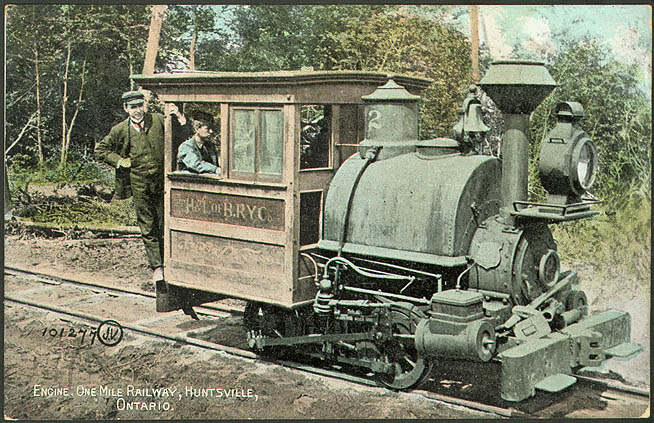
- One of the H&LR engines, from a hand-coloured postcard.

Overview
- Headquarters: Huntsville, Ontario, Canada
- Reporting mark: H & L of BRYC
- Locale: Lake of Bays, Canada
- Dates of operation: 1904–1959

Technical
- Track gauge: 3 ft 6 in (1,067 mm)

The Huntsville and Lake of Bays Transportation Company was a company chartered in 1895 to operate steamboats on the Lake of Bays, and a series of lakes connecting to Huntsville in the northern section of the Muskoka Lakes District of Ontario, Canada. The wholly owned Huntsville and Lake of Bays Railway ran a short line narrow gauge railway to connect steamboats operating on Lake of Bays and Peninsula Lake outside Huntsville, Ontario. Covering a vertical distance of 175 feet (53 m) along the hilly 1.125-mile (1.811 km) route, it was known as the "smallest commercially operated railway in the world".

The network, which eventually contained eight steamboats, a single locomotive and several hotels and lodges in the area, operated as a unit until 1959. At that time, increasing automobile use led to a rapid decline in laker traffic. The hotels were sold off one by one, but the company remained a legal entity until 1967. The railway was purchased by the town of St. Thomas in southern Ontario, where it was reassembled to become the Pinnifore Park Railway. During the 1980s it was purchased by a group of enthusiasts in Huntsville and returned north, operating today as the Portage Flyer.

== History ==
The lakes and rivers of the Muskoka Lakes region have long been used for transportation by the Algonquian-speaking Anishinaabeg peoples, and they were heavily used by the first Europeans who visited the area. In the latter half of the 19th century, the land north of Barrie was being opened up for colonization via land grants. As roads were in poor condition or non-existent, the only reliable form of transportation was by steamboat. By 1875 a pair of locks and a canal had been built to bypass a series of rapids in the Muskoka River, allowing navigable access between Mary Lake and Huntsville. In 1886 another canal was built to connect from Fairy Lake to Peninsula Lake to the east.

A broken link in the chain of lakes served by the growing network existed between Lake of Bays and Peninsula Lake, which connected in turn to Fairy Lake and the town of Huntsville. The short distance between the two lakes was too steep to justify building a canal. Within a distance of 1,800 metres (5,900 ft) the elevation change was more than 30 metres (98 ft). A ridge down the middle adds another 20 metres (66 ft). This obstacle was initially overcome by the construction of a gravel road in 1887, but the steep terrain made shipping any heavy loads via buckboard very difficult.

=== Portage railway ===
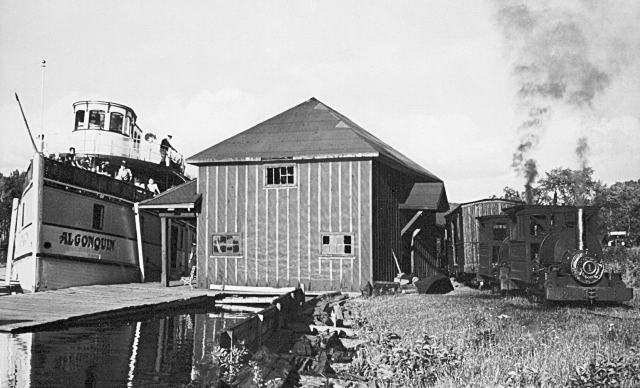
The SS Algonquin docks at North Portage station outside of Huntsville, Ontario. The two-locomotive train of the Huntsville and Lake of Bays Railway waits for passengers to board before leaving for South Station, a short distance away.

George F. Marsh ran steamers on a number of lakes in the area, and in 1895 he bought out his major competitor, Alfred Denton. This left him in control of most of the commercial shipping on Lake of Bays and the lower Fairy, Mary and Peninsula lakes, which he incorporated as the Huntsville and Lake of Bays Transportation Company. That year, he received a charter to build an electric railway in the gap between Peninsula Lake and Lake of Bays, which would complete his network.

By 1900 no work on the electric railway had been carried out, and he reincorporated as the Huntsville and Lake of Bays Navigation Company with a separate charter for a railway as the Huntsville and Lake of Bays Railway. This company was allowed to raise up to $50,000 in shares, and would connect not only Peninsula Lake and Lake of Bays, but extend to the west end of Hollow Lake as well. Seeing a big future for the area, the original company reincorporated once again in 1902 as the Huntsville, Lake of Bays and Lake Simcoe Navigation Company, with a charter for shipping, "hotels, house boats, boarding houses, cottages and summer resorts".

Work had not commenced on the portage railway by this time, although its charter stipulated the undertaking was to be started within three years and completed within seven. Originally planned to use electric power and standard gauge, the plans changed to narrow gauge and steam power when two surplus locomotives and rolling stock became available from E.B. Eddy of Hull, Quebec. These had originally been built by H.K. Porter of Pittsburgh in 1888. Two coaches were built from horse-drawn streetcars of the Toronto Street Railway, modified so the seat backs could flip over so the passengers always sat facing the direction of travel. The crew also built two boxcars and three flatcars.

Construction finally began in September 1902, but proved more difficult than expected, and in 1903 the charter was extended another two years to allow time to complete it. In 1904, Marsh failed to get Federal funding to help complete it, but was given $10,000 provincial grant instead. Trains were operating after the close of navigation season in 1904, and the line officially opened as the Portage Railway in 1905. The second section to Hollow Lake was never completed, and the charter was amended to remove it in 1906.

=== Expansion ===
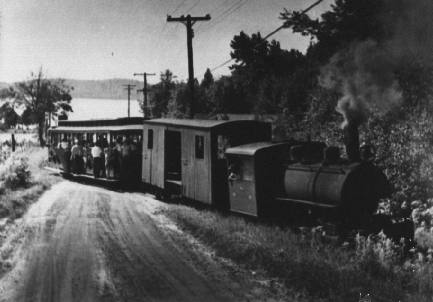
When re-engined, the Huntsville and Lake of Bays Railway called its train the Portage Flyer. Here the Flyer is seen pulling out of South Portage station.

Marsh died in 1904, while work on the railway was still underway. The company was purchased in 1905 by Charles Orlando Shaw, owner of the Anglo-Canadian Leather Company in Huntsville and Bracebridge, which was the largest tannery in the British Empire. The tannery required huge amounts of wood for heating, and hemlock for tanning, and the Portage Railway became a major link in his supply chain. The company's charter was resigned in 1907, and over the next decade he expanded the shipping fleet considerably, before turning to hotel building.

Shaw began his hotel construction with the relatively small Wawa Hotel, which opened in 1908 on Norway Point on Lake of Bays. This was a success, and he turned his eye towards a much larger and more lavish destination. He purchased the 268 hectares (660 acres) Bigwin Island from Ojibwe Chief Chevodin (Joseph Big Wind) in 1910, and built the 280 room Bigwin Inn in 1920. The Bigwin was a hit, and became well known in Muskoka for its entertainment.

=== Decline ===
By 1939, the effects of the Great Depression and the opening of other routes led to a decline in business. Peaking at eight steamers, the fleet now had only two. Shaw died in 1942 and the company passed to his son-in-law. The Bigwin Inn was sold in 1947 and the company was passed to Shaw's daughter, Pauline Gill. Operations were turned over to Carl McLennan in 1948, and he had moderate success replacing the now old steamships with modern motorboats.

The original Porter locomotives reached the end of their lives in 1948, and were sold to a collector, Cameron Peck of Chicago, and finally came to rest at the Harold Warp Pioneer Village in Minden, Nebraska. They were replaced by two much larger engines, one coal and one oil-fired, originally built by Montreal Locomotive Works in 1926. The 21 long tons (21 t) oil-fired engine proved to be too heavy and was put into storage. The coal-fired Engine 1 gave the train its new name, Portage Flier. This second life lasted into the 1950s, when the rise of automobile use cut the lake traffic, and the railway shut down in 1959.

=== Moving away, and back ===
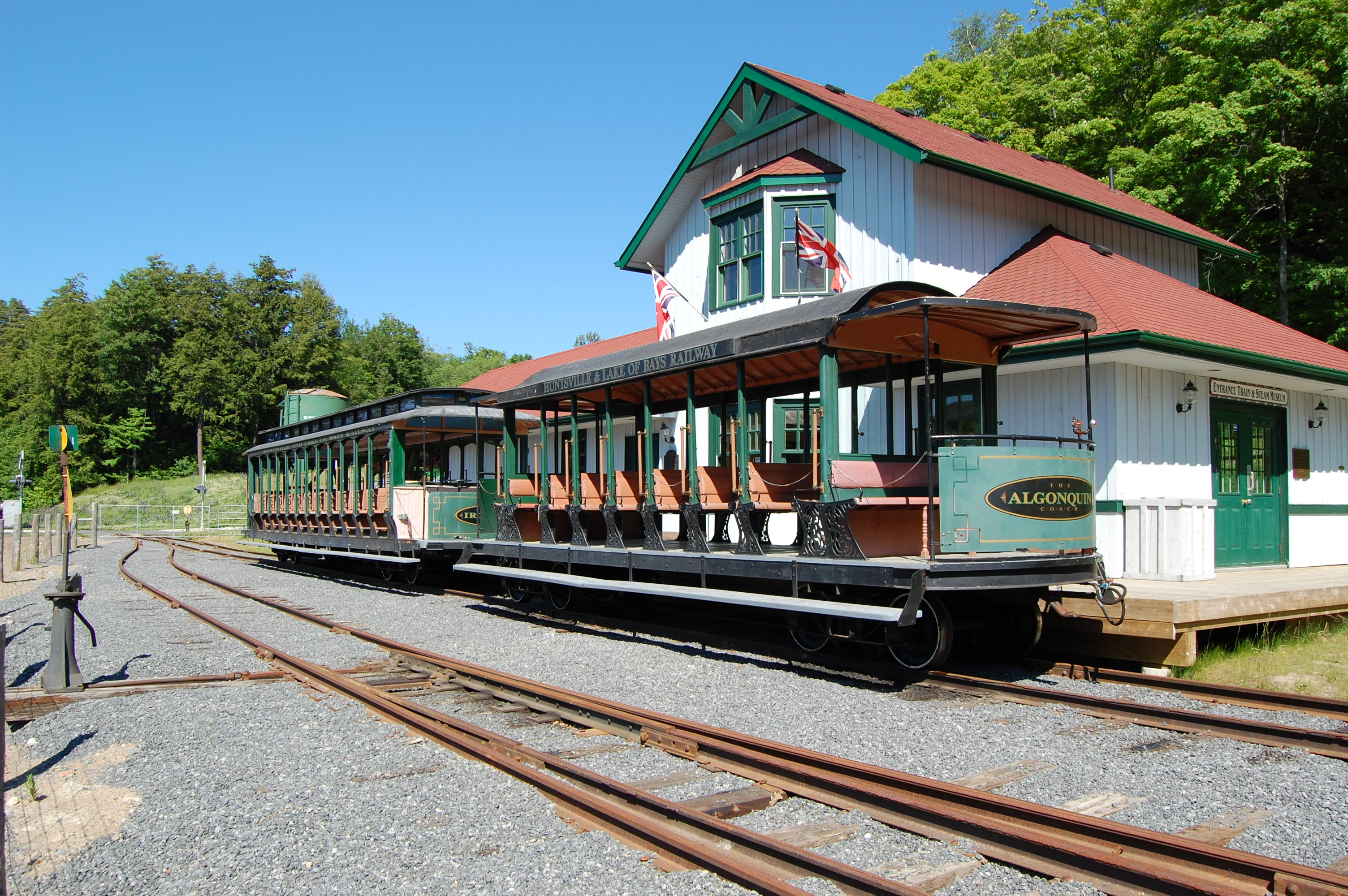
Rotary Village Station operated by the Huntsville and Lake of Bays Railway Society

With its closure, the railway track and single locomotive were moved to St. Thomas, Ontario, where they were used at the Pinafore Railway Park. In 1984 the locomotive was put up for sale, which coincided with increasing interest in the Huntsville area to revive the railway. The newly chartered Huntsville and Lake of Bays Railway Society purchased the entire set, initially planning to recreate the original line. However, cottage construction in the area made it impossible, and after considering a number of sites, they eventually decided to build a new site in partnership with the Muskoka Pioneer Village. The resulting Muskoka Heritage Place opened on 1 July 2000, with a 1 kilometre (0.62 mi) route.

== Railway route ==
The Portage Railway began at what became known as South Portage Station, running south onto Lake of Bays on a dock with three spurs. The line ran north from this point, passing a water tank and then connecting to a small spur with a maintenance shed. Shortly north of the spur, the line turns almost due west to follow the northern shore of Osbourne's Lake, then turns roughly north again after a short distance.

The line continues north to a point just south of Peninsula Lake, where it turns to the west for a distance. This is a spur that forms a switchback; the train travels to the west onto this line, switches, and then travels back eastward into North Portage Station. Here there were two parallel spurs paralleling the south bank of the lake, and a more substantial station.

Sections of the original right-of-way remain visible at Muskoka Road 23, and a sort section of line has been restored at South Portage, along with the addition of historical plaques at both ends.

== Steamboats ==
Through its existence, the company operated several steamboats (see table). At the time, the area was becoming a popular resort destination. Several large hotels operated on the Lake of Bays and on the lower lakes and the steamboat business grew to service them, connecting with the Grand Trunk Railway, at Huntsville. Steamboats operated on both sides of the portage. The lower lakes run started in Huntsville and ran east through Fairy Lake and into Peninsula Lake. After the trip on the portage railway, passengers boarded another steamboat for a trip on Lake of Bays. All the boats were powered by steam engines except the Iroquois II which used a diesel engine.

Ship Name	Built	Owner	Operation	Notes
S.S. Northern	1877	Denton	Lower Lakes	Dismantled in 1897
S.S. Erastace Wiman	1890	Denton	Lower Lakes	Burned December 15, 1899.
S.S. Mary Louise	1884	Marsh	Lake of Bays	Retired in 1907
S.S. Excelsior	1884	Marsh	Lower Lakes	Purchased in 1891. Burned in 1894
S.S. Lady of the Lake	1886	Marsh	Lake of Bays	Dismantled in 1910
S.S. Empress Victoria	1894	Marsh	Lower Lakes	Built on hull of Excelsior. Retired in 1915
S.S. Dortha	1894	HLBTC	Lake of Bays	Renamed the Ramona in 1908. Retired during the depression
S.S. Joe	1900	HLBTC	Both	Dismantled in 1919 and sunk - bow can be seen (below water) south side of Portage Bay, Lake of Bays.
S.S. Phoenix	1900	HLBTC	Both	Tugboat. Dismantled in 1925
S.S. Florence Main	1901	HLBNC	Both	Imported to Huntsville, from Muskoka Lake 1904, entered service 1905, moved to L' of Bays 1907, rebuilt 1913.
S.S. Mohawk Belle	1913	HLBNC	Lake of Bays	Reconstructed from Florence Main
S.S. Algonquin	1906	HLBNC	Lower Lakes	Hull replaced in 1928. Retired in 1952
S.S. Iroquois	1907	HLBNC	Lake of Bays	Retired in 1948, sank at South Portage dock - stern can be seen 5' below water.
M.S. Iroquois II	1949	HLBNC	Both	Transferred to Lower Lakes in 1953. Sold in 1960
