= Maple Ridge, Ontario =

Maple Ridge, Ontario, may refer to:

- Maple Ridge, Muskoka Municipal District, Ontario
- Maple Ridge, Stormont, Dundas and Glengarry United Counties, Ontario
