= Art Asbury =

Canadian hydroplane boat racer

Arthur Challinor Asbury (March 24, 1922, in Dwight, Ontario – November 13, 2003, in Bobcaygeon, Ontario) was a Canadian hydroplane boat racer. He was inducted into the Canadian Motorsport Hall of Fame in 2001.

== World record ==
On November 1, 1957, Asbury broke the world water speed record by driving the Miss Supertest II 184.54 miles per hour on Long Reach, Picton, Ontario.
