= Lake of Bays (Muskoka lake) =

Lake in District Municipality of Muskoka, Ontario, Canada

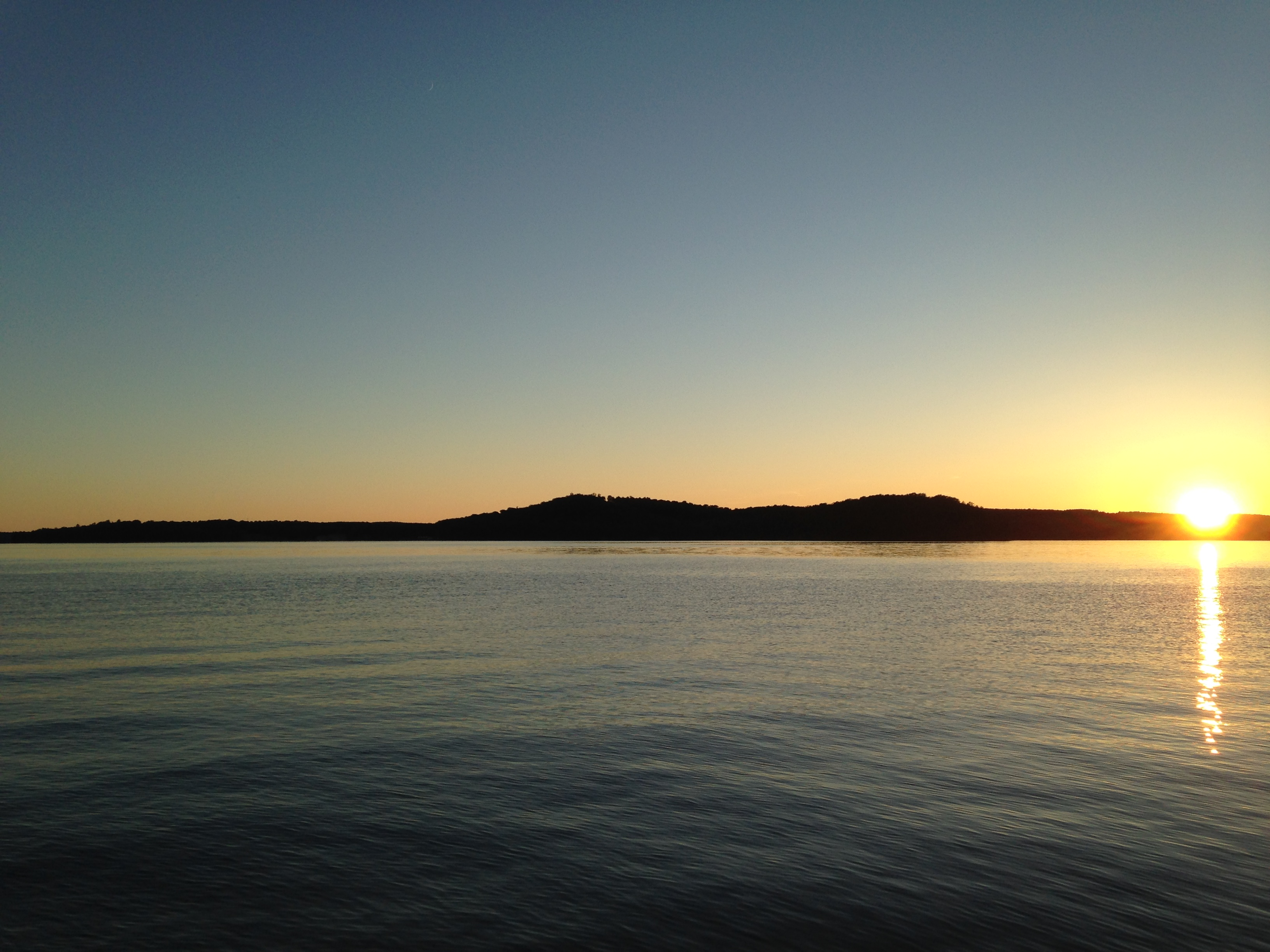
- Sunset over Bigwin Island

- Location in Southern Ontario
- Location: District Municipality of Muskoka, Ontario
- Coordinates: 45°15′02″N 78°59′54″W
- Primary inflows: Oxtongue River, Boyne River
- Primary outflows: South Branch Muskoka River
- Basin countries: Canada
- Surface area: 68.8 km^{2} (26.6 sq mi)
- Average depth: 22.25 m (73.0 ft)
- Max. depth: 79.25 m (260.0 ft)
- Water volume: 1.53 km^{3} (0.37 cu mi)
- Shore length^{1}: 167 km (104 mi)
- Surface elevation: 316 m (1,037 ft)
- Islands: Bigwin Island, Fairview Island, Langmaids Island, Roothog Island, Crown Island, Millichamp Island, Mariebianca Island, Champion Island, Castle Island, Burnt Island, Shamrock Island, Ensko Island, Hanes Island, Zephyr Island, Pancake Island, Turner's Island, Haystack Island, Raynor Island, Reuben Island, Harper Island, Rock Island, Gardner Island, Vimy Ridge Island, Wee Island, Helen Island
- Settlements: Baysville, Dorset, Dwight
- ^{1} Shore length is not a well-defined measure.

Lake of Bays is a large lake in the District Municipality of Muskoka in Central Ontario, Canada. It is located almost entirely in the Township municipality of Lake of Bays, which is named after the lake, with the exception of the southwest arm of the lake which is in the Town of Huntsville. Ontario Highway 35 runs north and east of the lake.

Port Cunnington is a community established on a peninsula reaching out deep inside the lake. Other settlements on the lake shore include Dwight, South Portage, Baysville and Dorset.

== Geography ==
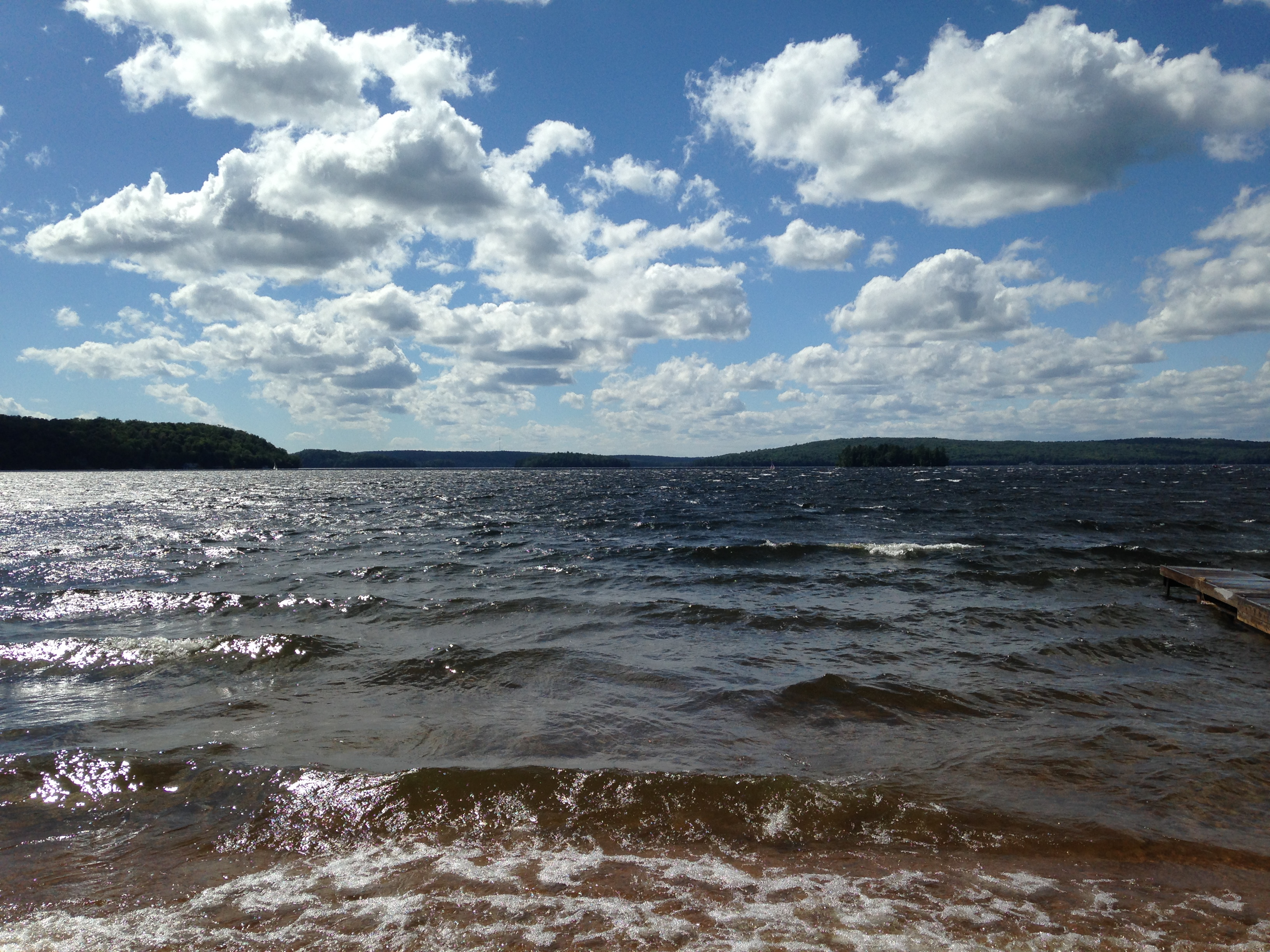
View from beach near Norway Point

The lake is fed by Oxtongue River, as well as other rivers and creeks flowing from the north-east (Boyne River and its tributary Sixteen Mile Creek, Ten Mile Creek, Hollow River, St. Mary Creek).

Bigwin Island is the largest island in the lake; other islands include Burnt Island, Fairview Island, Langmaids Island, Pancake Island, Raynor Island, Rock Island, Haystack Island, Millichamp Island, Reuben Island, Crown Island and Peanut Island. The irregular shape of the lake is defined by many bays such as Rabbit's Bay, Burnt Island Bay, Whitehouse Bay, Montgomery Bay, Portage Bay, Haystack Bay, Ten Mile Bay, Dwight Bay, Trading Bay and Murky Bay.

=== Lake characteristics ===
Lake of Bays is a deep, cold, infertile lake which forms an important part of the Muskoka watershed. Despite its size and basin shape, low fertility and a short residence time combine to make it only moderately productive. Lake of Bays water is clear, and the maximum secchi disc reading obtained was 8 m (26 ft).

The surface layer, which is 9 meters (30 ft) in depth, varies in temperature throughout the year. In the summer months of July and August, the surface layer can have an average temperature approaching 21 °C (70 °F), while the top few metres can warm to about 26.5 °C (79.7 °F). Below the top layer, the summer temperature drops rapidly to around 7 °C (45 °F).

== Origin of name ==
The First Nations apparently called the lake Num g e low e nee g go mark lak a hagan which means Lake of Forks. It was also known as Baptiste Lake, Forked Lake and Lake of Two Bays. In 1837, David Thompson traversed the lake and drew a map of the lake that refers to it as Forked Lake. On September 5, 1837, Thompson mentioned catching lake trout in the lake. Thomas Moffatt, an agent for the Hudson's Bay Company (Moffatt reported an outpost on Bigwin Island) referred to it as Trading Lake. In 1853, a geological survey by Alexander Murray of the Geological Survey of Canada referred to the lake as Lake of Bays.

== Amenities ==
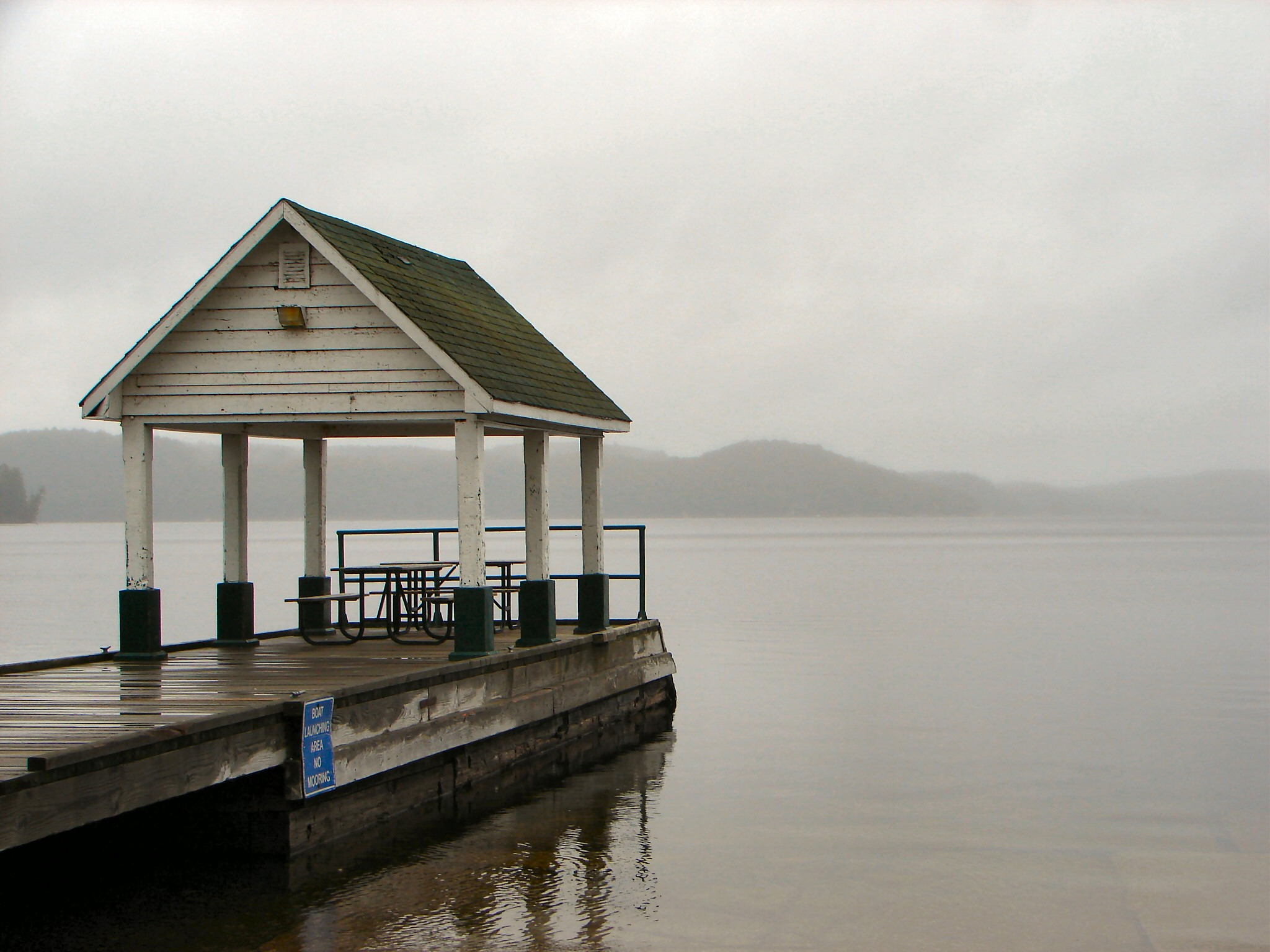
Pier at Dwight Beach

Due to the many bays and large size of the lake, a number of amenities have appeared around the lake including lodges, resorts, campgrounds, and golf clubs.

== Fish species ==
There are many fish species in Lake of Bays. Those known to exist are:

- Lake trout
- Brook trout
- Rainbow trout
- Northern pike
- Pumpkinseed
- Rock bass
- Smallmouth bass
- Largemouth bass
- Cisco
- Whitefish
- Lake herring
- White sucker
- Longnose sucker
- Burbot
- Yellow perch
- Trout-perch
- Rainbow smelt
- Brown bullhead
- Fathead minnow
- Bluntnose minnow
- Common shiner
- Blacknose shiner
- Northern redbelly dace
- Brook stickleback
- Northern pearl dace
- Creek chub

=== Fishing ===
Lake of Bays is fished by cottagers, local residents and many visitors to the area. Lake trout and smallmouth bass are the main sport species and the lake has produced a number of trophy lake trout in excess of 20 pounds. These trout are difficult to catch, and require heavy trolling equipment once the lake warms up. Smallmouth bass are often found in the shallower water around the shores and on shoals. During the winter, the lake provides fishing for lake trout, whitefish, smelts, and burbot.

== See also ==
- List of lakes in Ontario
- Official Community Website for Lake of Bays, Hillside | Oxtongue Lake | Dwight
