= Hidden Valley Resort =

Coordinates: 45.355°N 79.1256°W

Hidden Valley Resort (also known as HV) is a holiday resort in Huntsville, Ontario, Canada, about 225 kilometers (140 mi) north of Toronto. It is situated on one shore of Peninsula Lake, which is also home to the nearby Deerhurst Resort.

Hidden Valley is currently operated by Sequel Hotels and Resorts – previous owners include Best Western and Holiday Inn – who, in early 2006, completed a C$500,000 renovation project. Along with a 100-room four-star resort hotel, Hidden Valley boasts two pools (one indoor and one outdoor), a fitness centre and meeting rooms; a variety of water sports on the lake, which include windsurfing, canoeing, kayaking, pedal boats, and swimming; tennis courts, beach volleyball and horseshoe pits; Birches, a value-priced restaurant, focusing on creativity; and an expansive sandy beachfront.

The resort also includes three rows of townhouse-style, semi-detached condominium blocks (making up approximately 80 units in total). Each block contains up to four single residences, which are stacked into four-storey buildings, other than the lakefront properties. Each individual unit generally occupies two storeys of a building, and has its own entrance. While the condominium units share the same amenities with the patrons of the hotel complex, these units are no longer owned by the hotel, but rather are privately owned and rented.

During the winter months (December–March, as conditions allow), the Hidden Valley Highlands Ski Area, established in 1965, is open for downhill and cross-country skiing and snowboarding. The region has a maximum vertical drop of 327 ft (100 m), with a top elevation of 1,276 ft (390 m). The area consists of four ski lifts and thirteen trails – four rated Green Circle (beginner), four Blue Square (intermediate), three Black Diamond (advanced), and two Double Black Diamond (expert). As well, there are locations for tobogganing and ice skating, and snowmobile trails available.

Nearby attractions include 36 holes of championship golf at the Deerhurst Lakeside and Deerhurst Highlands golf courses, and Algonquin Park.
