= Peninsula Lake =

Lake in Muskoka District Municipality, Ontario, Canada

- Looking out from Wolf Mountain

- Location within Ontario
- Location: Muskoka District Municipality, Ontario
- Coordinates: 45°20′N 79°7′W
- Basin countries: Canada
- Max. length: 10.7 km (6.6 mi)
- Surface area: 840 ha (8.4 km^{2}; 3.2 sq mi)
- Max. depth: 37 m (121 ft)
- Water volume: .0838 km^{3} (0.0201 cu mi)
- Shore length^{1}: 29.8 km (18.5 mi)
- Surface elevation: 284 m (932 ft)
- Islands: Hills Island, Wolf Island, Cubby Island, Grassy Island
- Settlements: Huntsville, Township of Lake of Bays
- ^{1} Shore length is not a well-defined measure.

Peninsula Lake in the District Municipality of Muskoka, known colloquially as "Pen Lake," is one of the Muskoka Lakes.

Peninsula Lake is a mid-sized cold-water lake located just east of Huntsville, Ontario. Municipal jurisdiction is split between the Town of Huntsville and the Township of Lake of Bays. The Lake encompasses a surface area of 868.8 ha (8.6 km^{2}) and a total shoreline of 27.4 km.

The shoreline of Peninsula Lake is generally characterized as being typical of most developed cottage country lakes. The land immediately surrounding Peninsula Lake has predominantly residential uses, however, there are 7 commercial resorts, including Cedar Grove Lodge, one commercial ski hill, and one residential condominium. Other resorts on the lake include Deerhurst Resort and Hidden Valley Resort. There are two large islands on the lake. Hills Island, the larger of the two, is situated in the central waters and Wolf Island is located in Wolf Bay at the lake's eastern edge.

There is currently no industrial development, although the area has been heavily logged over the past two centuries.

The G8 summit was held on the lake at the Deerhurst Resort from June 25–26, 2010.

The water level of Peninsula Lake is controlled at two points. The first control point, which is the outlet of the lake, is the Peninsula Canal, located between Fairy and Peninsula Lake. The canal was excavated in 1888 to facilitate access to Peninsula Lake by large steam ships. Before the canal was created the area consisted of a small stream and wetland. The second point is a water control structure located at the outlet of Fairy Lake.

== Origin of Name ==
Peninsula Lake was named by the explorer and surveyor Alexander Murray during his 1853 expedition to the area. Murray named the lake in honor of its distinctive geographical shape, which features two prominent peninsulas on its northern shoreline.

== Early Settlement ==
The first permanent settlers in the area were Reverend Robert Norton Hill and his family, in 1869, on the peninsula. The trail Hill created to Hunstville, originally known as Hill's Trace, is now the current path of Highway 60.

== Early development ==
In 1877 a dam was constructed to control the water levels of Fairy and Peninsula Lakes to enhance navigation and logging operations. The Huntsville and Lake of Bays Railway, completed in 1905, was a 1.8 km link that connected Peninsula Lake and Lake of Bays, playing a vital role in opening North Muskoka to tourism and development.

== History of Tourism ==
Founded in 1896 by Charles W. Waterhouse, Deerhurst Resort was the first major summer resort on Peninsula Lake and Muskoka's northern lakes. Cedar Grove Lodge started as a resort in 1927, Tally Ho Inn was established as a year-round resort in 1939, and Colonial Bay was established as Brooklyn Lodge in the 1940s. From the canal's construction in 1888 until 1958, tourists and cottagers used private steamships to get to Peninsula Lake.

== Fish Species ==
- Northern pike
- Smallmouth bass
- Largemouth bass
- Pumpkinseed
- Lake trout
- Yellow perch
- Rock bass
- Brook trout
- Rainbow trout
- Walleye

== See also ==
- List of lakes in Ontario
