= Portage railway =

Railway section used to bypass unnavigable watercourses

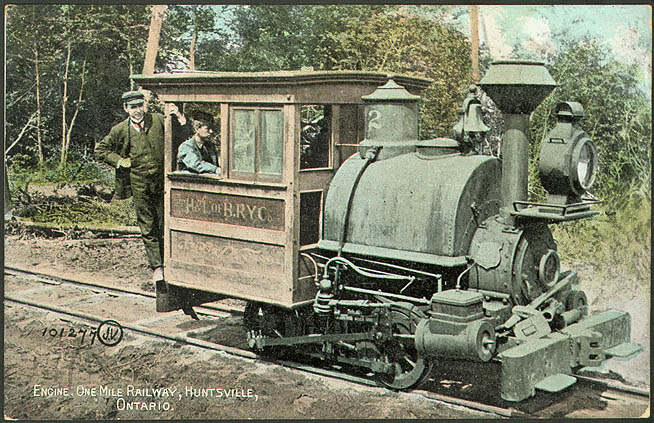
A Huntsville and Lake of Bays Railway engine, an example of a small locomotive on a narrow-gauge portage railway.

A portage railway is a short, and possibly isolated, section of railway used to bypass an unnavigable section of a river or to connect two bodies of water which are not directly linked. Sometimes, cargo from waterborne vessels is unloaded, transferred onto conventional railroad rolling stock, and transported to the other end of the railway, where it is then unloaded and loaded onto another waterborne vessel. Other portage railways directly carry boats and barges. A portage railway is essentially the opposite of a train ferry.

== Examples ==
The following are or were locations of portage railways:

=== Australia ===
- Victor Harbor to Goolwa – originally horse drawn – mouth of Murray River often silted up or was useless due to low water levels.
- the first railway in Queensland started at the inland river port of Ipswich rather than the capital of Brisbane to save money. Twenty years later, the line was extended to Brisbane.
- several rail lines terminated at river ports, such as Robertson, Echuca, Bourke, Morgan, Brewarrina

=== Brazil ===
- Madeira-Mamoré Railroad (365 km; 227 mi) along the huge rapids of upper Madeira

=== Canada ===
- Carillon and Grenville Railway
- Champlain and St. Lawrence Railroad
- Chignecto Ship Railway
- Huntsville and Lake of Bays Transportation Company
- Nosbonsing & Nipissing Railway
- White Pass and Yukon Route

=== Central African Republic ===
- Zinga to Mongo

=== China ===
- The Three Gorges Portage Railways, on each side of the Yangtze River in the Three Gorges Dam area (see Three Gorges Dam#Portage railways). Preliminary work on this project started in 2012.

=== Japan ===
- The Keage Incline Railway, 582 meters in length, once connected Lake Biwa Canal to the Nanzenji Boat Reservoir in the Kyoto Kamo River

=== Congo-Brazzaville ===
- Congo-Ocean Railway

=== Congo-Kinshasa ===
- Matadi–Kinshasa Railway
- Ubundu to Kisangani, see Great lakes line first section

=== England ===
- Cromford and High Peak Railway connected Cromford Canal to the Peak Forest Canal

=== Greece ===
- Diolkos near Corinth Canal

=== Laos ===
- Don Det – Don Khon narrow gauge railway

=== Panama ===
- Panama Railway

=== Russia ===
- Krasnoyarsk hydroelectric dam ship elevator

=== United States ===
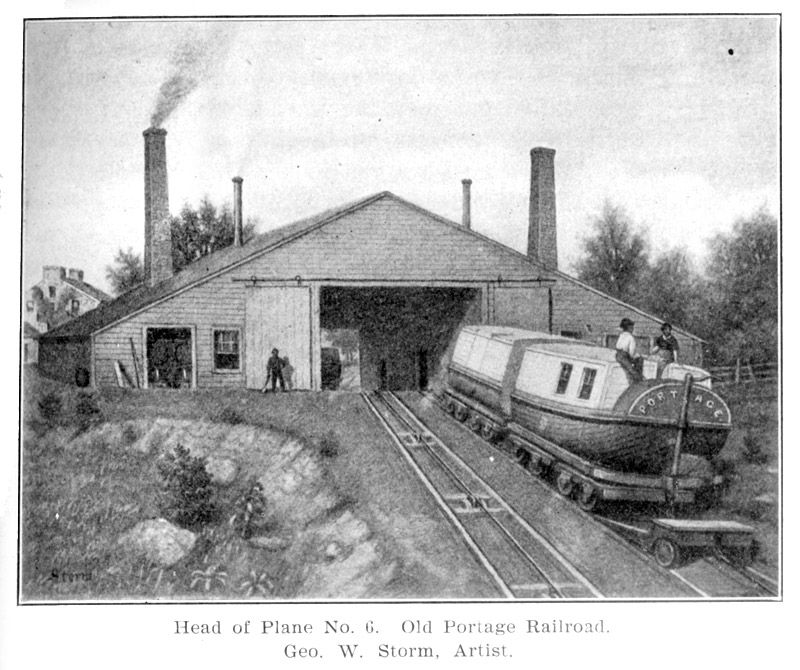
The Allegheny Portage Railroad drawn by George W. Storm in 1839.

- Allegheny Portage Railroad
- Morris Canal
- New Castle and Frenchtown Turnpike and Rail Road
- Tuscumbia, Courtland and Decatur Railroad

=== Czechia ===
- Narrow gauge line on Kamýk Dam used for transport of canoes and flatboats over the dam.
