= Dorset, Ontario =

Community in Ontario, Canada

Coordinates: 45°14′41″N 78°53′38″W

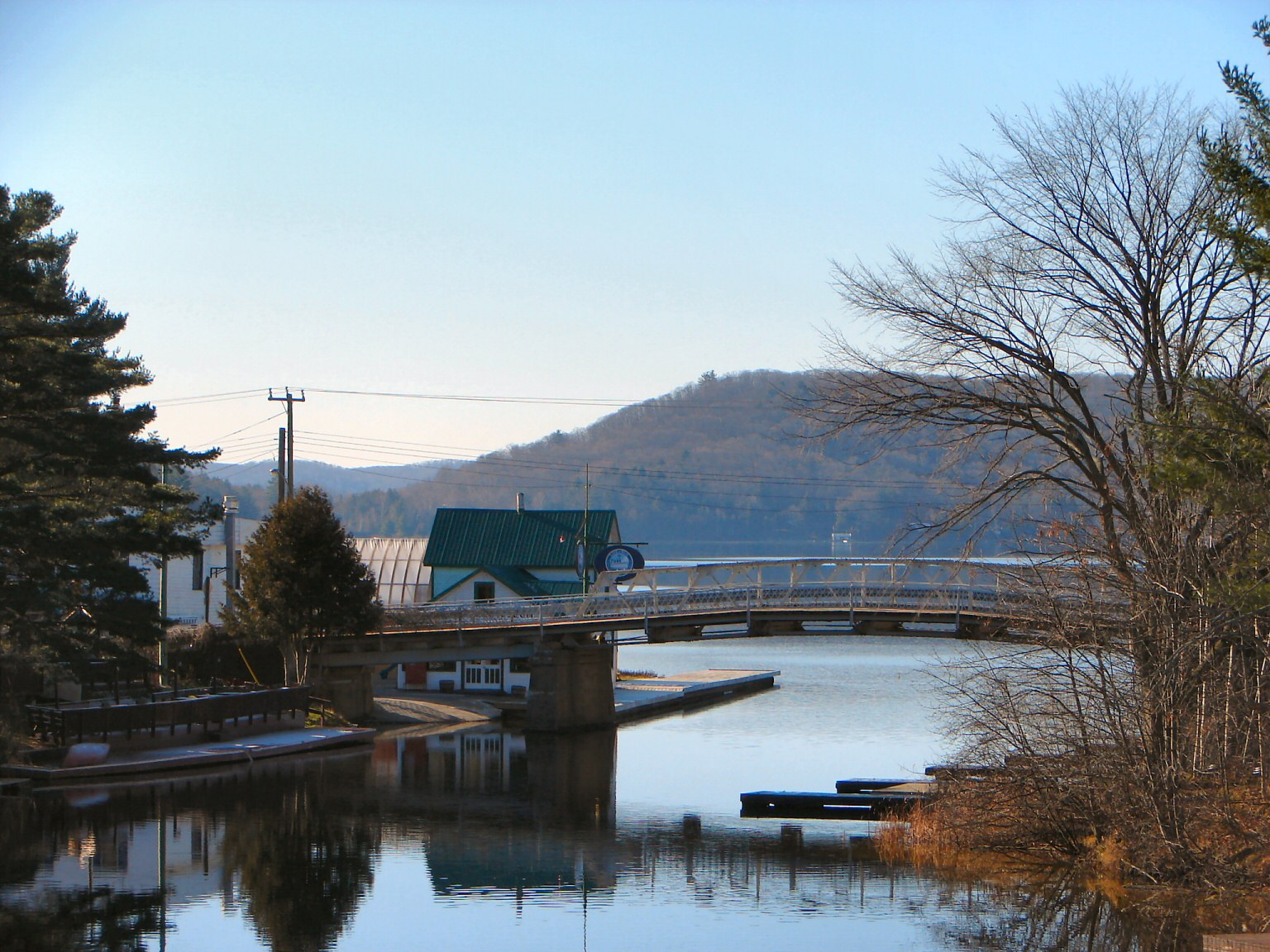
Dorset

Dorset is a small community located on the boundary between the Algonquin Highlands Township in Haliburton County, Ontario and Lake of Bays Municipality in Muskoka District, Canada. Dorset was originally called Cedar Narrows. In 1859 Francis Harvey became the first European settler here. Zachariah Cole mapped out the area for the government around 1860. The community name was chosen by some of the settlers that came from Dorset, England.

As of 2009, Dorset has a local permanent population of approximately 400 although these numbers increase more than tenfold in the summer months due to cottagers and vacationers.

== Geography ==
Dorset is located within the Canadian Shield ecological region of Canada. The region has many lakes surrounded by mixed hardwood forests of predominately Sugar Maple, Red Oak, White Ash, and Yellow Birch as well as softwoods such as Eastern White Pine, Black Spruce, Eastern Hemlock, and Balsam Fir. Spruce bogs, wetlands, large granite rock outcroppings are also common in the local area.

Dorset is located on the shores of Lake of Bays between Big and Little Trading Bay. The two bodies of water are connected via the natural Dorset Channel that runs through the middle of Dorset.

== History ==
First Nations' Chippewas of Bigwin Island made this part of Lake of Bays their summer campgrounds for years. When white settlers began moving into the area in the early 1800s, Dorset became known as Trading Bay for Francis Harvey's trading post that sprang up along the Narrows. No one knows who the first white travelers were, but someone carved 1675 into a rock in the area – found in the early 1800s by Tom Salmon, one of the first settlers on Lake of Bays. Over the years the hamlet saw an influx of loggers, timber barons, hunters and trappers, soon to be followed by settlers in 1868 taking up free grant land. While the land looked promising, as it was cleared it became apparent that the stony Canadian Shield did not lend itself well to farming. The lakes and forests were much more appealing to tourists who soon followed into the region every summer. The families of Chief Yellowhead and Chief Bigwin continued to summer in this region well into the middle of the 1900s. The town line divides the main street between Sherborne and Ridout townships. Sherborne was surveyed in 1862 by Gen. Thomas Ridout, who named it for his hometown in England. Ridout was named for the surveyor himself. The abutting ward, Franklin took its name from the great Arctic explorer who died seeking the fabled Northwest Passage. Now Sherborne is incorporated into the Algonquin Highlands, while Ridout and Franklin were encompassed into the Township of Lake of Bays. The village has a long and colourful history. Zachariah Cole, one of the surveyors on the Bobcaygeon Road, saw such promise here that he became the first settler, clearing 17 acres. When the logging boom hit, Zac Cole built a hotel and trading post on the site of an old French Trading post, complete with a whiskey still in the backyard next to a brick kiln. A driving force in developing the young village, Zac used to claim he wanted his coffin made from tamarack, because it burned with loud cracks and noises, so everyone in Hell would know he had arrived.

== Transportation ==
Dorset is intersected by Ontario Highway 35 and Ontario Highway 117. Baysville, Bracebridge, Dwight and Huntsville are the nearest local population centers which are approximately 25, 50, 18, and 40 kilometers away, respectively.

== Industry ==
Historically, Dorset has been primarily dependent on the forestry industry; although over the years this dependence has diminished and tourism, mainly American, European, and Japanese tourists, has taken over as the dominant contributing industry to the local economy.

== Tourism ==
Dorset depends on tourism as a major contributor to the local economy. The summer months tend to be the busiest time of the year for the community as thousands of people from the Greater Toronto Area and abroad flock to their cottages. In autumn, many visitors also come to see the changing fall foliage in the local forests. Dorset's relatively close proximity to Algonquin Provincial Park makes it a prime spot for tourists. The community has among other amenities: Health hub, art galleries, pottery, post office, bakery, day spa, restaurants, ice cream shops, real estate brokerages, marinas, gas stations, building suppliers, bed and breakfasts, motel, as well as a general store and LCBO liquor store to name a few.

=== Attractions ===
The Dorset Scenic Look Out Tower is located on a high ridge above the community and the tower offers a panoramic view of the surrounding hills and picturesque Lake of Bays in the Muskoka / Haliburton region and is open year round; although the access road is not plowed or maintained in the winter months. The 30-metre tall tower sits 142 metres above the nearby Lake of Bays. Built in 1967 on the site of the original fire tower (1922–1962), the scenic lookout is open to cars from late spring until Thanksgiving. Snowmobilers can access the tower in the winter months. The tower as well as the ridge is a dominant geographical feature in Dorset as it can be seen from almost anywhere within Dorset. (In 1963, the former Dorset Fire Tower was shown in the opening credits of the CBC TV show The Forest Rangers).

Dorset is home to the famous Robinson's General Store, once voted "Canada's Best Country Store", owned and operated by the same family since 1921. The store was sold by the Robinson family in 2020, and was sold again in 2023.

Lion's Camp Dorset is a resort for Ontarians on kidney dialysis, located a few kilometres east of Dorset on Raven Lake. The resort has a dialysis unit onsite in order to provide guests in renal failure with their dialysis three times a week.

The Dorset Heritage Museum is located on Main Street and features many displays about Dorset's early pioneer life, significant historical past as a major logging community. The museum is open on weekends from Victoria Day until Canada Day then Wednesday through Sunday until Thanksgiving. Entrance is by donation.
