= Lake of Bays =

Township in Ontario, Canada

- Township (lower-tier)
- Township of Lake of Bays
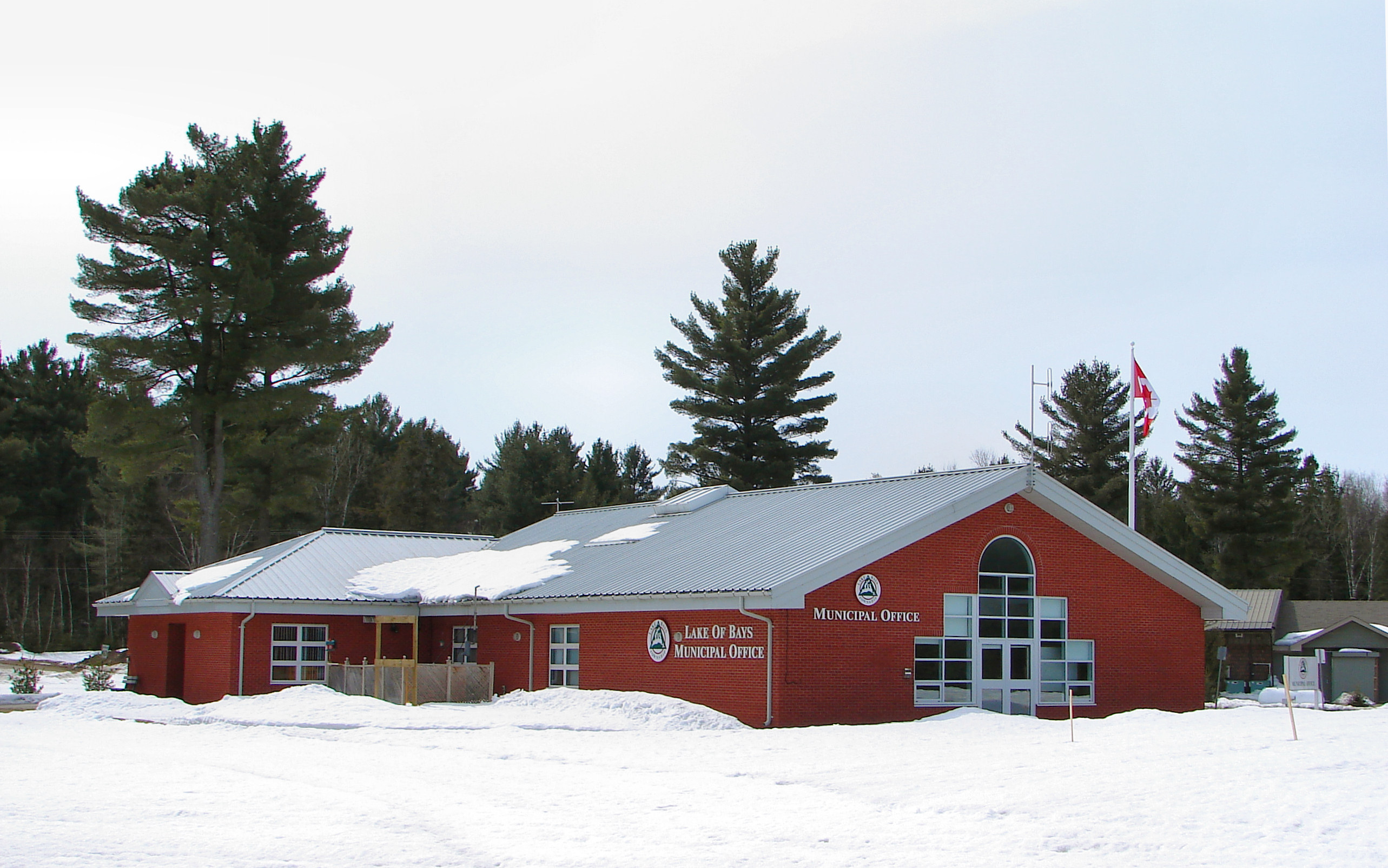
- Municipal office in Dwight

- Location within Southern Ontario
- Coordinates: 45°18′27″N 79°00′23″W
- Country: Canada
- Province: Ontario
- Regional district: Muskoka
- Incorporated: 1971

Government
  - Type: Township
  - Mayor: Terry Glover
  - MP: Scott Aitchison (Conservative)
  - MPP: Graydon Smith (OPC)

Area
  - Land: 667.43 km^{2} (257.70 sq mi)

Population (2021)
  - Total: 3,759
  - Density: 5.6/km^{2} (15/sq mi)
- Time zone: UTC-5 (EST)
  - Summer (DST): UTC-4 (EDT)
- Postal code span: P0A, P0B, P1H
- Area codes: 705, 249
- Website: www.lakeofbays.on.ca

Lake of Bays is a township within the District Municipality of Muskoka, Ontario, Canada. The township, situated 193 kilometres (120 mi) north of Toronto, is named after the Lake of Bays. In the 2021 census, the township had a population of 3,759 and encompassed 667.43 square kilometres (257.70 sq mi) of land.

Located in the northeast corner of Muskoka, Lake of Bays offers a natural landscape of forests, rocks, lakes and wetlands. It is an important destination for cottaging, recreation and tourism in Ontario. Currently, the economy of the township is primarily based on tourism, recreation, and the service sector with forestry and aggregate (composite) extraction contributing as well.

== History ==
The Township of Lake of Bays was established on January 1, 1971, from the former Townships of Franklin, Ridout, McLean, and Sinclair/Finlayson (unorganized) as part of the reorganization of the District of Muskoka.

In the early 20th century, several grand resort hotels opened on the lake, among them the Wawa (built in 1908 and destroyed by fire in 1923) and the Bigwin Inn, a resort that operated on Bigwin Island from 1920 until the late 1960s. These hotels were sought-after destinations for many rich and famous individuals and groups at the time, including Hollywood stars like Clark Gable, writers like Ernest Hemingway and, during the Second World War, the Dutch royal family.

The township was once home to what was known as the smallest commercial railway line in the world, the Huntsville and Lake of Bays Transportation Company portage railway. Between 1904 and 1958 it ferried passengers between North Portage on Peninsula Lake to South Portage on Lake of Bays, a distance of 2 kilometres (1.2 mi). The train, named the Portage Flyer, was discontinued in 1958 and was relocated to an amusement park near St. Thomas, Ontario, until 1984. Much of the original components have since been repatriated and continue to operate on the grounds of Muskoka Heritage Place near Huntsville.

== Geography ==
=== Communities ===
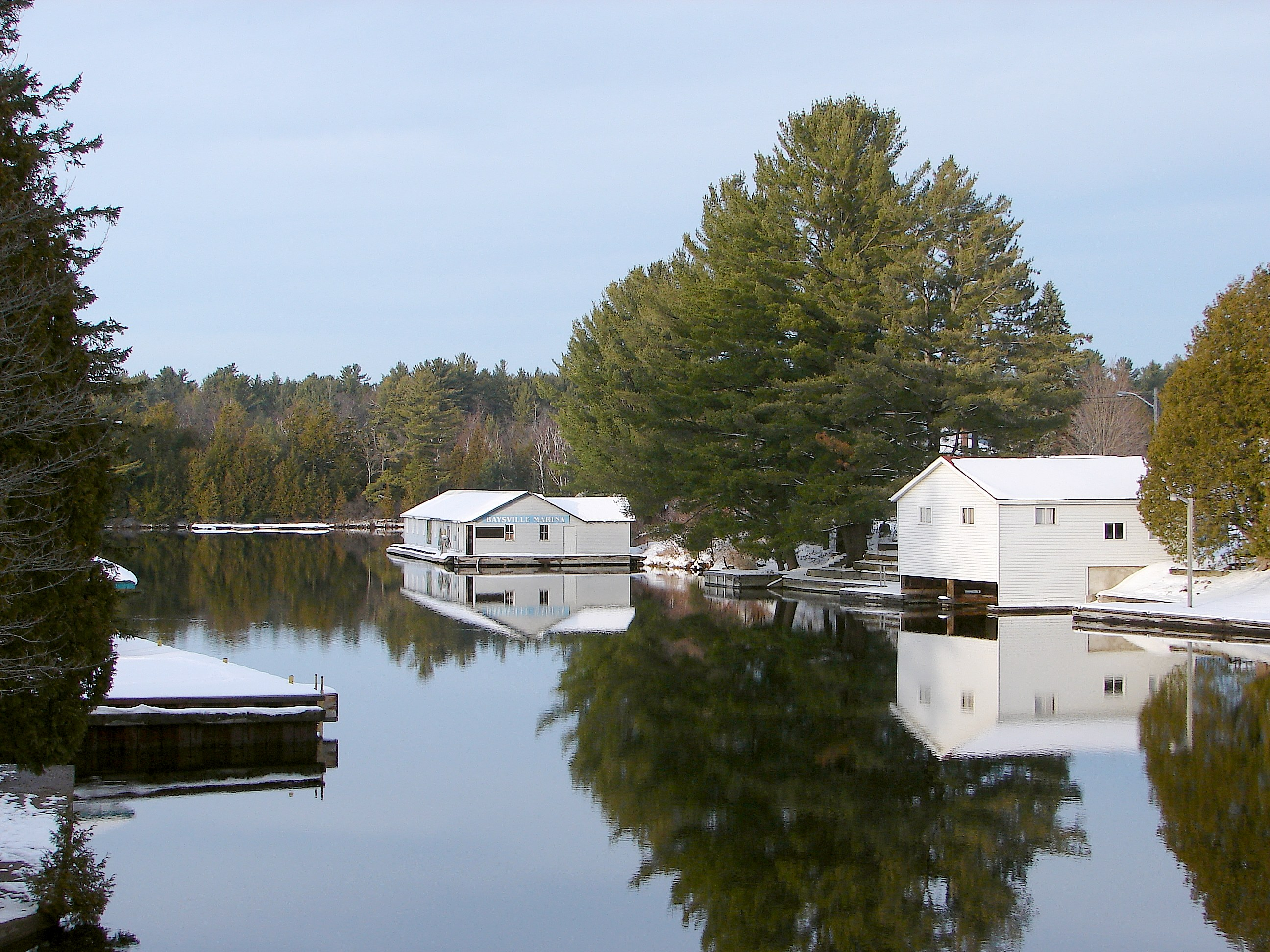
Baysville

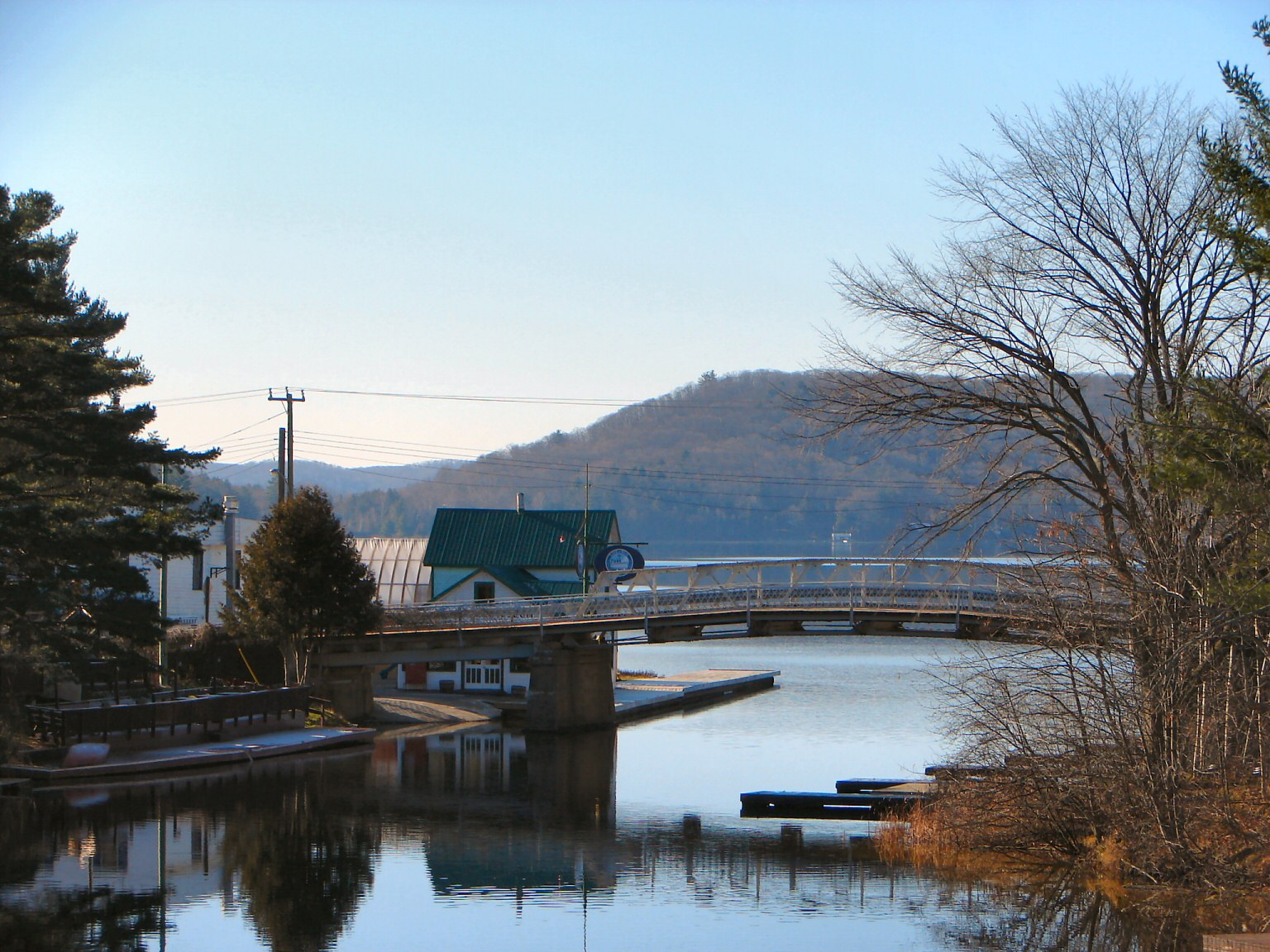
Dorset

The township includes the communities of:

- Baysville
- Bigwin
- Birkendale
- Bona Vista
- Bondi Village
- Britannia
- Brooks Mills
- Browns Brae
- Dorset (partially)
- Dwight
- Fox Point
- Glenmount
- Grandview
- Grassmere
- Grove Park
- Hillside
- Limberlost Lodge
- Lumina
- Maple Ridge
- Millar Hill (ghost town)
- Nith Grove
- North Portage
- Norway Point
- Port Cunnington
- Sea Breeze
- South Portage
- Wahawin

A small community developed on the subdivided landholdings of a sawmill built by William Brown in the 1870s. The economic development of Baysville was enabled by good road and steamboat connections. Baysville developed into a popular region for vacationers and sportsmen.

=== Bodies of water ===
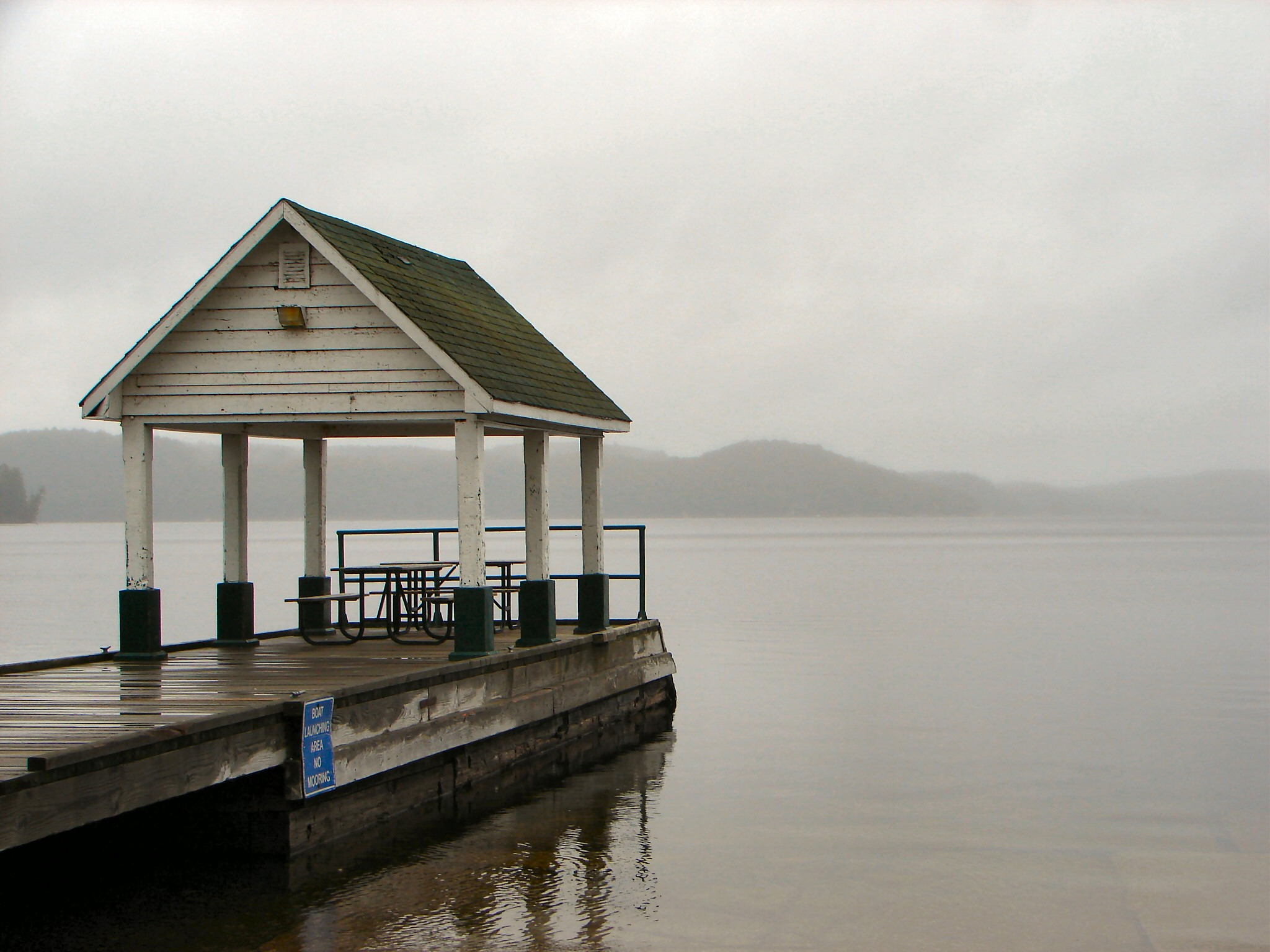
Lake of Bays in Dwight

- Cooper Lake
- Echo Lake
- Ellis Lake
- Lake of Bays
- Oxtongue River
- Peninsula Lake
- Ril Lake
- Rusynyk Bay
- Tackaberry Lake

== Demographics ==
In the 2021 Census of Population conducted by Statistics Canada, Lake of Bays had a population of 3,759 living in 1,760 of its 4,324 total private dwellings, a change of 18.7% from its 2016 population of 3,167. With a land area of 667.43 km^{2} (257.70 sq mi), it had a population density of 5.6/km^{2} (14.6/sq mi) in 2021.

Canada census – Lake of Bays community profile

	2021	2016	2011
Population	3,759 (+18.7% from 2016)	3,167 (-9.7% from 2011)	3,506 (-1.8% from 2006)
Land area	667.43 km^{2} (257.70 sq mi)	677.91 km^{2} (261.74 sq mi)	677.58 km^{2} (261.62 sq mi)
Population density	5.6/km^{2} (15/sq mi)	4.7/km^{2} (12/sq mi)	5.2/km^{2} (13/sq mi)
Median age	58.4 (M: 58.4, F: 58.8)	57.5 (M: 57.2, F: 57.7)
Private dwellings	4,324 (total) 1,760 (occupied)	4,388 (total)	4,850 (total)
Median household income	$90,000	$69,888

References: 2021 2016 2011

Historical census populations – Lake of Bays

Year	Pop.	±%
1971	1,729	—
1976	2,078	+20.2%
1981	2,123	+2.2%
1986	2,298	+8.2%
1991	2,775	+20.8%
1996	2,850	+2.7%

Year	Pop.	±%
2001	2,900	+1.8%
2006	3,570	+23.1%
2011	3,506	−1.8%
2016	3,167	−9.7%
2021	3,759	+18.7%

2011 Population figure based on revised count. Population counts are not adjusted for boundary changes.
Source: Statistics Canada

== In film ==
The 1949 FitzPatrick Traveltalk Ontario: Land of Lakes includes a segment on Bigwin Inn.

In 1963, the former Dorset Fire Tower was shown in the opening credits of the old CBC TV show The Forest Rangers. The tower can also be seen in the 1999 Canadian documentary Over Canada: An Aerial Adventure.

The lake scenes from the Canadian film starring Gordon Pinsent called Away From Her were also shot in the township on the south shore of Lake of Bays across from Price's Point.

== Notable residents ==
- Art Asbury, speed boat racer and one-time world speed record holder.

== See also ==
- List of townships in Ontario
- Limberlost Forest and Wildlife Reserve
