= Bigwin Island =

Island in Ontario, Canada

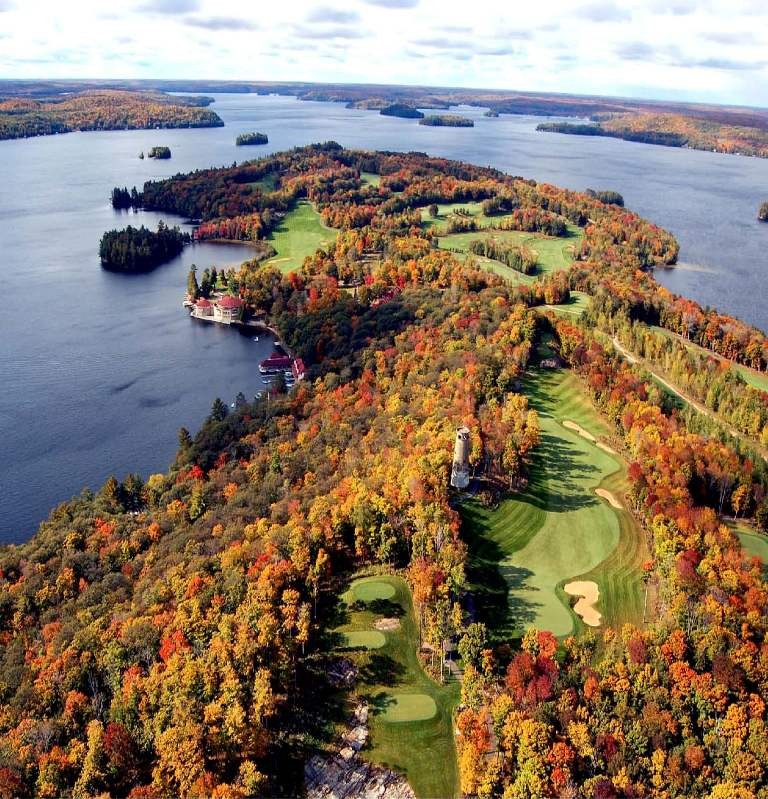
- Bigwin Island Fall Photo

- Location in Southern Ontario

Geography
- Location: Lake of Bays
- Coordinates: 45°14′34″N 79°01′37″W
- Area: 222 ha (550 acres)
- Highest elevation: 333 m (1093 ft)

Administration
- Canada
- Province: Ontario
- District Municipality: Muskoka
- Municipality: Lake of Bays

Additional information
- Time zone: Eastern Time Zone (UTC-5)
  - Summer (DST): Eastern Time Zone (UTC-4)

Bigwin Island is an island in the municipality of Lake of Bays, District Municipality of Muskoka in Central Ontario, Canada. It is the largest island on Lake of Bays.

There are multiple Indigenous burial grounds on the island and immediately offshore (due to flooding from industrial damming). The first property developers agreed to preserve and protect all the graves from desecration and to let Chief John Bigwin be buried here with his ancestors after he died.

== Bigwin Inn, 1920–1966 ==
The first development on Bigwin Island was known as the Bigwin Inn, which opened in 1920. It was an exclusive summer destination for tourists from Toronto and the US eastern seaboard, and was developed by Charles Orlando Shaw, a Huntsville businessman. He founded the Bigwin Inn Company Ltd. in 1915 and hired architect John Wilson of Collingwood to design the resort. With 350 guest rooms, it was one of the biggest and most beautiful resorts in Muskoka at the time. Wilson employed classical, Mediterranean, dodecagon, craftsman, Tudor and Victorian design elements, placed the buildings using the natural shoreline and landscape, used natural sunlight as much as possible, and connected the buildings with covered, lit walkways. Most construction took place during the winter, as the ice made it easier to transport supplies to the island, usually by horses and sleigh. Key buildings were the Indian Head Dining Room, which could seat up to 750 guests at one time, the dance pavilion and the rotunda.

The first nine-hole golf course on Bigwin, designed by Stanley Thompson, opened in 1922. It became an 18-hole course by 1930.

At its height during the 1930s, many renowned musicians played at the dance pavilion. By then, the smaller marine dining room and the less elaborate Tea House were built, along with the ferry house to store the many boats that serviced Bigwin.

From 1941 to 1945 the Dutch royal family summered on the island when they were exiled in Ottawa. Beatrix of the Netherlands and her family lived in private cottages. The rotunda was used to store the constitution of the Netherlands.

C. O. Shaw died of a heart attack in 1942, and although the inn appeared highly successful while he managed it, the following years were clearly not as profitable. Ownership passed through several hands until Frank Leslie purchased the property in 1949. Leslie operated on a non-profit basis and was successful in attracting entertainers to Bigwin, it was popular as a result, but due to illness he had to sell the hotel in the 1960s. Bigwin Inn closed in 1966.

Attempts to reopen the island resort were made but for many years most of the inn's buildings remained unused. The west lodge, dance pavilion, ferry house, kitchens, golf clubhouse, staff bungalows, stables, rotunda and Mohawk Belle hull have been demolished. The 3000 foot unmanned/unmonitored concrete airstrip was built to allow wealthy cottagers from Toronto and the US to fly to the island. The abandoned airstrip has been landscaped, and the north end is now used to store boats. Though the rotunda fireplaces survive (except for one that obstructed a golf course view), plans for a boutique hotel onsite and extensive back lot condominium development are said to have been shelved. Perimeter island lots continue to sell and the Bigwin Inn dining room and tea house are restored to service. The future of the observation tower remains uncertain while the building looks neglected and decayed. The ferry Bigwin is stored in the ferry house for many years. Supported by cross beams to dock cribbing, it survived for many years with bow, stern and bridge remaining above water. While the superstructure remained intact, many fittings were removed as the vessel sat idle as a residual asset of the Bigwin Inn Company Limited, The Bigwin Boat Livery Company Limited and said to be the subject of liens and outstanding mortgages. In the 1990s, the ferry was going to be removed from its berth, taken to the mid-channel of Lake of Bays and scuttled as a wreck site. Instead, the owners of the ferry house sold the boat stored there. After being towed and transported to a new storage site, the ferry was eventually restored by those that paid for it and their supporters.

The golf course was developed by Real Estate developer Alan Peters, who purchased the island in 1986 in partnership with Jack Wadsworth. The course, designed by Doug Carrick, notably lacks water hazards. The developer transferred ownership and responsibilities to its members in 2011.

Ownership of the east lodge, main dock, pavilion and boat house is with another company Muskoka Condo Corp 1 (MCC1). Old hotel rooms in the lodge were converted to condos in the 1960s and come up for sale.

== Golf course ==
The Bigwin Island Golf Club has a par 72 championship course measuring 7,166 yards from the championship tees, 6,742 yards from the blue tees, 6,287 yards from the white tees and 5,346 yards from the red tees. Each nine is a par 36 consisting of two par threes, two par fives and five par fours.

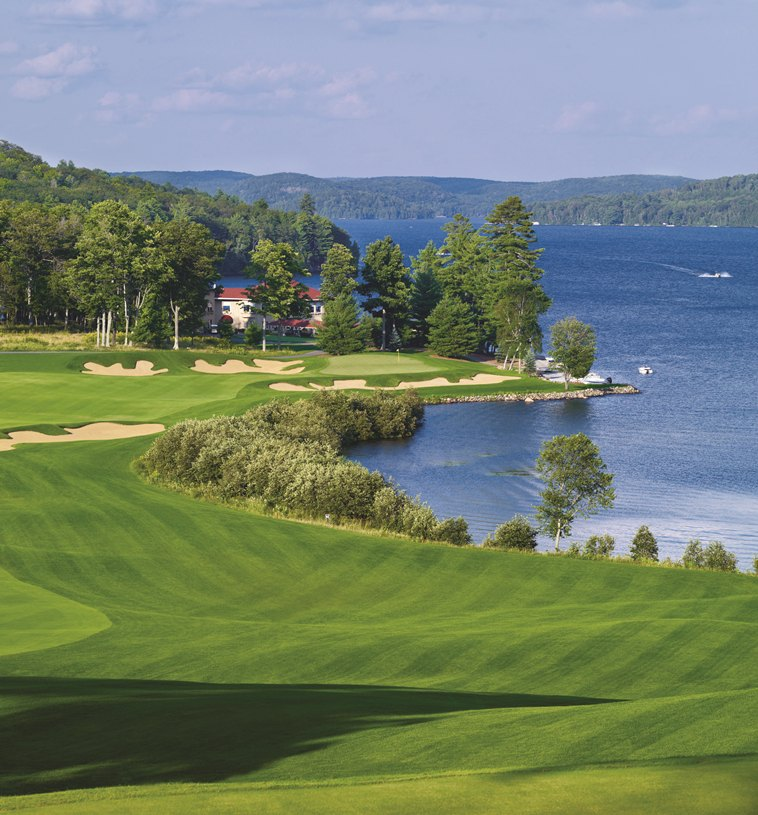
18th Hole Bigwin Island Golf Club Photo
