= District Municipality of Muskoka =

Muskoka
- Regional municipality (upper-tier)
- District Municipality of Muskoka
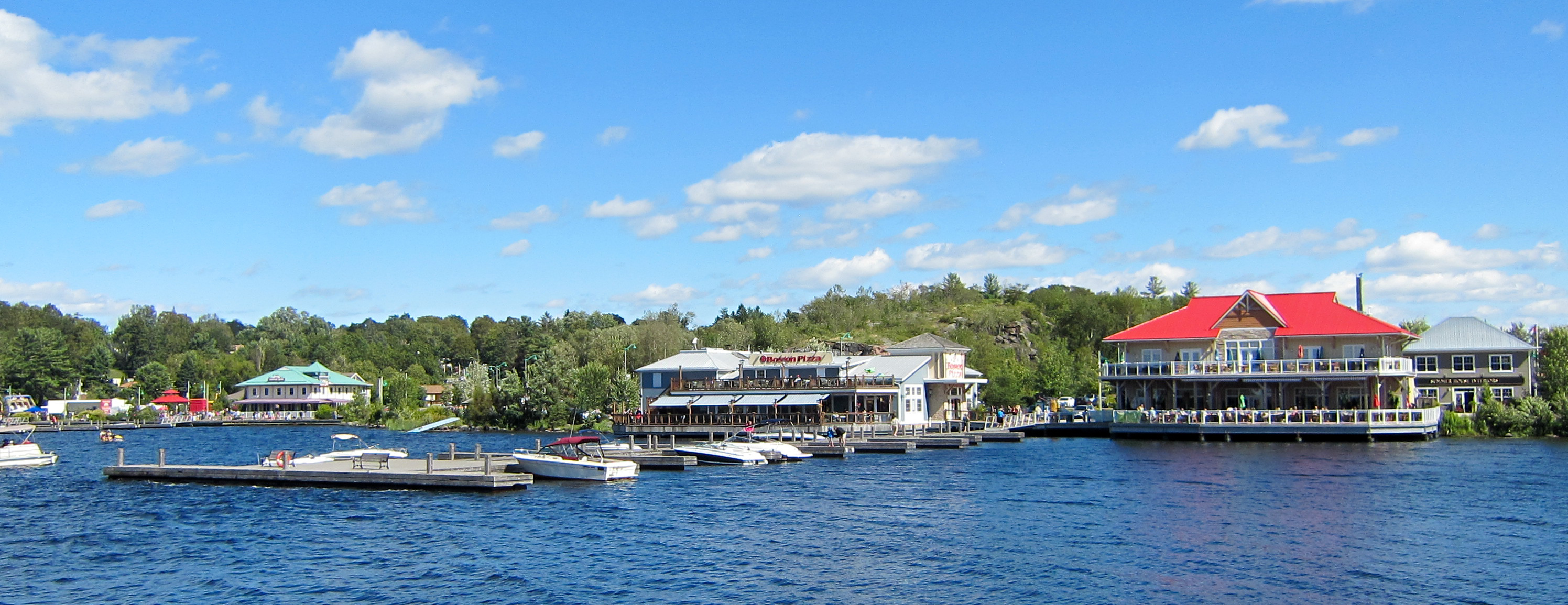
- Muskoka Bay at Gravenhurst

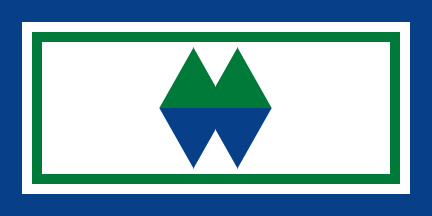
- Flag Logo

- Map showing Muskoka District Municipality location in Ontario
- Coordinates: 45°10′N 79°20′W
- Country: Canada
- Province: Ontario
- Territorial District of Muskoka: 1868
- Municipality of the District of Muskoka: 1873
- Provisional Judicial District of Muskoka: 1899
- District Municipality of Muskoka: 1971
- Seat: Bracebridge

Government
  - District Chair: Scott Aitchison
  - Governing Body: Muskoka District Council

Area
  - Land: 3,839.47 km^{2} (1,482.43 sq mi)

Population (2021)
  - Total: 66,674
  - Density: 17.4/km^{2} (45/sq mi)
- Time zone: UTC-5 (EST)
  - Summer (DST): UTC-4 (EDT)
- Website: www.muskoka.on.ca

The District Municipality of Muskoka, often referred to as the District of Muskoka or simply Muskoka, is a regional municipality in Central Ontario, Canada. It extends from Georgian Bay in the west, to the northern tip of Lake Couchiching in the south, to the western border of Algonquin Provincial Park in the east. A two-hour drive north of Toronto, it spans 6,475 km^{2} (2,500 sq mi). It has some 1,600 lakes, making it a popular cottaging destination.

This region is referred to as "cottage country", due to its waterfront forested landscapes with over 2.1 million visitors annually. Muskoka is populated with several villages and towns, farming communities, lakeside vacation hotels and resorts near golf courses, country clubs, and marinas. Its regional government seat is Bracebridge and its largest population centre is Huntsville.

Muskoka is geographically within the Central Ontario region of the province, although it is treated as part of Northern Ontario and even Eastern Ontario by some government programs due to its status as a transitional area between the geographic regions.

Muskoka is a summer destination for GTA residents and was the most-searched Canadian destination for vacation rentals in 2017. It was ranked number one for Best Trips of 2011 by National Geographic and was a finalist for the same distinction in 2012.

The municipality's name derives from a First Nations chief of the 1850s. Lake Muskoka was then the hunting grounds of a troop led by Chief Yellowhead or Mesqua Ukie or Musquakie. He was revered by the government, which built a home for him in Orillia, where he lived until his death at age 95.

Muskoka has 60,000 permanent residents. An additional 100,000 seasonal property owners spend their summers in Muskoka, making the municipality a major summer colony. Due to the region's popularity and high property costs, hundreds of Muskoka properties are available for short-term rental through online platforms.

Many of Muskoka's seasonal properties are large summer estates, some of which have been passed down through families for generations. Most of these properties can be found along the shores of Muskoka's four major lakes: Lake Muskoka, Lake Rosseau, Lake Joseph, and Lake of Bays. In recent years, various Hollywood and sports stars have built retreats in Muskoka, including Steven Spielberg, Tom Hanks, Mike Weir, Martin Short, Harry Hamlin, Cindy Crawford, Goldie Hawn and Kurt Russell.

== History ==
=== Indigenous peoples ===
Geography drove history in the Muskoka region. Studded with lakes and rocks, the good land offered an abundance of fishing, hunting, and trapping, but was poorly suited to farming. The Muskoka and Haliburton area, with its chain of lakes and rivers, its fur-bearing animals, its fish, wild fruit, and maple sap, would have supported a large Indigenous population, but written evidence suggests that until very recent years, it has harboured only nomadic groups. Largely the land of the Ojibwa people, European inhabitants ignored it while settling what they thought were the more promising areas south of the Severn River. The Ojibwa leader associated with the area was Mesqua Ukie, for whom the land is believed named, as he was liked by the European Canadians. The tribe lived south of the region, near present-day Orillia. They used Muskoka as their hunting grounds. Another Ojibwa tribe lived in the area of Port Carling, then called Obajewanung. The tribe moved to Parry Sound around 1866.

In the present day, Muskoka contains four First Nations reserves:

- Wahta Mohawk Territory - an area used for hunting and fishing by Mohawk from the independent Kanesatake and Kahnewake reserves
- Indian River - shared between the Wahta and the Chippewas of Rama First Nation
- Moose Point 79
- Chippewa Island - shared between the Beausoleil First Nation, the Chippewas of Georgina Island First Nation and the Chippewas of Rama First Nation

=== European arrival ===
Until the late 1760s, the European presence in the region was largely limited to seasonal fur trappers, but no significant trading settlements were established. Following the American War of Independence, the British North America government feared invasion from its new neighbour to the south. The authorities began exploring the region, hoping to develop a settled population and find travel lanes between Lake Ontario and Georgian Bay. The first European known to have caught even a glimpse of Muskoka or Haliburton was a French youth, usually identified as Étienne Brûlé, and the year was in 1610 or 1611. In 1826, Lieutenant Henry Briscoe became the first European man known to have crossed the middle of Muskoka. The explorer David Thompson drew the first maps of the area in 1837 and possibly camped near present-day Beaumaris.

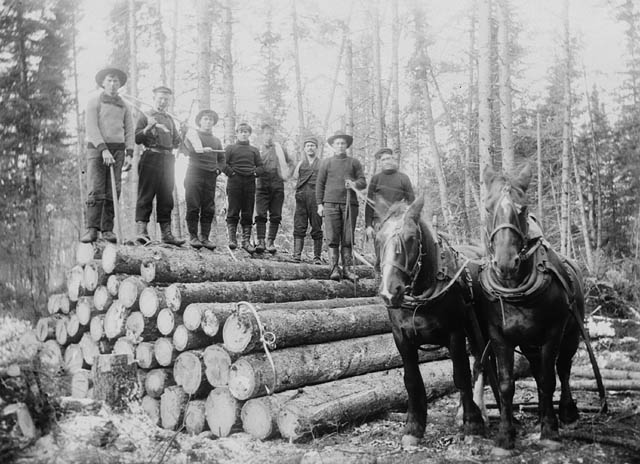
Horses hauling timber

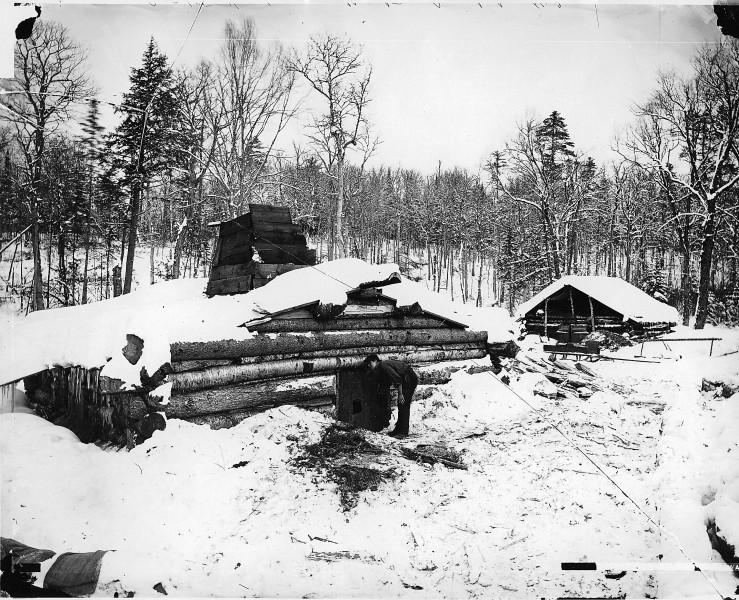
Lumbermen's shanty, Muskoka District (1873)

Canada experienced heavy immigration from Europe in the 19th century, and Muskoka was no different. Large numbers of settlers from the United Kingdom, and to a lesser extent, Germany, began to arrive. As the land south of the Severn was settled, the government planned to open the Muskoka region further north to settlement. Logging licences were issued in 1866, which opened Monck Township to logging.

The lumber industry expanded rapidly, denuding huge tracts of the area. Road and water transportation was developed and used later to facilitate town settlement. Road transportation took the form of the Muskoka Colonization Road, begun in 1858 and reaching Bracebridge in 1861. The road was roughly cut through from the woods and was of corduroy construction. Logs were placed perpendicular to the route of travel to keep carriages from sinking in the mud and swamps. This made for extremely rugged travel.

The railroad pushed north to support the industry, reaching Gravenhurst in 1875 and Bracebridge in 1885. The lumbering industry spawned a number of ancillary developments, with settlements springing up to supply the workers. Bracebridge (formerly North Falls) had some leather-tanning businesses develop. Tanners used the bark from lumber to tan hides, turning what would otherwise be a waste product to effective use.

=== Formation of the territorial district ===
The district was created in 1868, through the withdrawal of townships and unorganized territory from three other jurisdictions:

Formation of the District of Muskoka (1868)
Withdrawn from	Townships
Simcoe County	Morrison; Muskoka; Monck; Watt; Cardwell; Humphrey; Together with the unorganized territory lying between the southern boundary of Humphrey and the Severn River, bounded on the west by the western boundary of Humphrey extended southerly to the Severn River
Victoria County	Ryde; Draper; Macaulay; Stephenson; Brunel; Mclean; Oakley
District of Nipissing	Such unorganized territory as determined by proclamation

The townships of Stisted, Chaffey, Franklin, and Ridout (all from Victoria County) were transferred to the sistrict in 1873, while Humphrey Township was transferred to the Parry Sound District. In 1876, the boundaries of the District were formally defined by statute:

- To the south, the middle of the main channel of the Severn River, and a line formed by the southerly boundaries of the townships of Morrison and Ryde, the easterly boundary of Ryde, the southerly boundary of the township of Oakley, the easterly boundary of Oakley, and the southerly boundary of the township of Ridout;
- To the east, the Bobcaygeon Road and the line surveyed for its continuation;
- To the north, the southerly boundary of the Territorial District of Parry Sound, and, in that regard, the newly surveyed Conger Township was transferred to Parry Sound; and
- To the west, the waters of Georgian Bay, including its islands.

Although the townships were part of the district, they were still allied with their original counties for municipal purposes. This was rectified in 1877, when all of the district was declared to be within Simcoe County. This lasted until 1888, when it was separated from that county.

=== Settlement ===
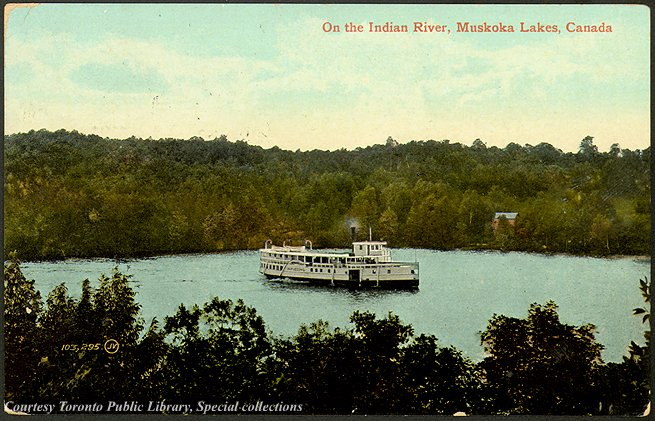
Steamship on Indian River Muskoka Lakes

The passage of the Free Grants and Homestead Act of 1868 opened the era of widespread settlement to Muskoka. Settlers could receive free land if they agreed to clear the land, have at least 15 acres (6.1 ha) under cultivation, and build a 16x20 ft, or 320-square-foot (30 m^{2}) house. Settlers under the Homestead Act, however, found the going hard. Clearing 15 acres of dense forest is a huge task. Once the land was clear, the settlers had to attack Muskoka's ubiquitous rocks, which also had to be cleared. Consisting largely of a dense clay, the soil in the region turned out to be poorly suited to farming.

As news of the difficult conditions spread back to the south, development in Muskoka began to falter, but development of the steamship revived industry. In a time when the railroads had not yet arrived and road travel was notoriously unreliable and uncomfortable, the transportation king was the steamship. Once a land connection was made to the southern part of the lake in Gravenhurst, the logging companies could harvest trees along the entire lakefront with relative ease. Steamships gave them the way to ship the harvest back to the sawmills in Gravenhurst.

Historic townships of the District of Muskoka
Township	Description
Baxter	Named for the Honourable Jacob Baxter, MPP for Haldimand County, Ontario from 1887 to 1898 and Speaker of the Ontario Legislature from 1887 to 1891.
Brunel	Named for noted civil engineer Isambard Kingdom Brunel, Engineer-in-Chief to the Great Western Railway of England. Known in Canada for constructing the steamship Great Western.
Cardwell	Named for Viscount Cardwell, Secretary of State for the Colonies from 1864 to 1866.
Chaffey	Named for a brother-in-law of Hon. Stephen Richards, Benjamin Chaffey, a Brockville contractor who helped build the St. Lawrence canals.
Draper	Named for judge William Henry Draper, Solicitor General of Upper Canada in 1837 and Attorney General of Upper Canada in 1840.
Franklin	Named for Arctic explorer Admiral Sir John Franklin.
Freeman	Named for John Bailey Freeman, MPP for the North riding of Norfolk County from 1879 to 1890.
Gibson	Named for Thomas Gibson, MPP for Huron from 1867 to 1898.
Macaulay	Named for Chief Justice of the Common Pleas Sir James Buchanan Macaulay (1793–1859), veteran of the War of 1812.
McLean	Named for Archibald McLean (1791–1865), a veteran of the War of 1812, he became Chief Justice of Upper Canada.
Medora	Named for Mrs. Medora Cameron, wife of a Toronto lawyer. She was also a niece of Hon. Stephen Richards, Commissioner of Crown Lands, hence the honour she received.
Monck	Named for Viscount Monck, Lord of the Treasury in the Palmerston government in the United Kingdom from 1855 to 1857, and Governor-General of British North America from 1861 to 1868.
Morrison	Named for Angus Morrison who represented the North riding of Simcoe County from 1854 to 1863. Morrison was also a director of the old Northern Railway of Canada, Muskoka's pioneer railway, the terminus of which was Gravenhurst. Morrison was also Mayor of Toronto from 1876 to 1878.
Muskoka	The township, district and lake are named for Musquakie, one of the principal Chiefs of the Chippawa Nation. In 1815 he signed the treaty under which the Indian title to a vast territory was surrendered to the Crown. The name means "Red Ground".
Oakley	Named for one (which one is uncertain) of 13 villages of the name in Great Britain, 12 of which are in England, one in Scotland.
Ridout	Named for the Ridout family, a very prominent Toronto family. They came from Sherborne in Dorsetshire, England, hence the name of Sherborne Township in Haliburton County, which adjoined Ridout Township on the east and hence also Dorset, a village in the township. Thomas Ridout was Surveyor-General of Upper Canada.
Ryde	Named for the town of Ryde on the Isle of Wight.
Sinclair	Named for Donald Sinclair, MPP for the North Riding of Bruce County from 1867 to 1883.
Stephenson	Named for Robert Stephenson, son of George Stephenson of locomotive fame, Robert Stephenson designed the Victoria Tubular Bridge at Montreal, then the greatest Canadian bridge.
Stisted	Named for Major General Henry William Stisted, Lieutenant-Governor of Ontario from Confederation, July 1, 1867 to 1868.
Watt	Named for James Watt of steam engine fame.
Wood	Named for Edmund Burke Wood, Provincial Treasurer in the John Sandfield Macdonald Government. In 1874, he was appointed Chief Justice of Manitoba.

=== The steamship era ===
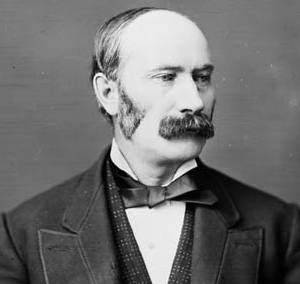
Alexander Cockburn (1879)

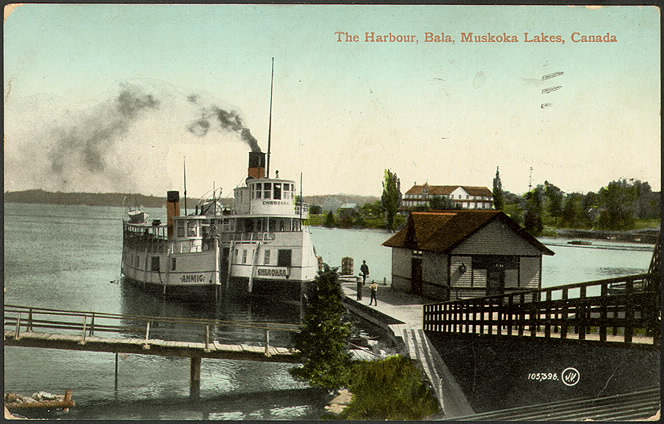
The Ahmic and Cherokee docked at Bala (1910)

Sometimes called the Father of Muskoka, Alexander Cockburn began placing steamers on the lake system. Starting with his steamship the Wenonah, Ojibwa for "first daughter", in 1866 Cockburn pressed the government to open the entire Muskoka lake system to navigation. He urged installing locks in Port Carling and opening a cut between Lake Rosseau and Lake Joseph at Port Sanfield. The government was eager to reinforce development in light of the faltering agricultural plan, and built the big locks in Port Carling in 1871. Cockburn's steamers had access to the entire lake system. Through the years he added more ships; when he died in 1905, his Muskoka Navigation Company was the largest of its kind in Canada.

Shortly after the arrival of the steamships, another industry began to develop as agriculture never could. 1860 two young men, John Campbell and James Bain Jr, made a journey that marked them as perhaps the first tourists in the region. Taking the Northern Railway to Lake Simcoe, they took the steamer Emily May up the lake to Orillia, and rowed across Lake Couchiching. They walked up the Colonization Road to Gravenhurst, where they vacationed. They liked what they saw and repeated the journey every year, bringing friends and relatives. These early tourist pioneers increased demand for transport services in the region. People were drawn by the fishing, natural environment, and an air free of ragweed, providing relief for hay fever sufferers.

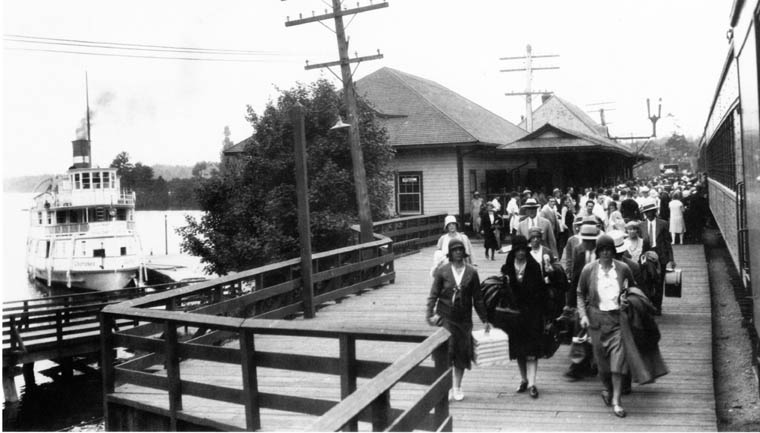
Bala train station and the SS Cherokee (1919)

Early tourists built camps, but were joined by others desiring better accommodations. Farmers who were barely scratching a living from the rocky soil soon found demand for overnight accommodations arriving on their doorsteps. Some made the switch quickly and converted to boarding houses and hotels. The first wilderness hotel, called Rosseau House, was built at the head of Lake Rosseau in 1870. It was owned by New Yorker William H. Pratt. The idea caught on and the number of tourists increased, establishing the tourist industry as the up-and-coming money earner in the 1880s.

The steamship era gave rise to the area's great hotels: Rosseau, Royal Muskoka, Windermere, Clevelands House, Beaumaris, and many more. When the railroad reached Gravenhurst in 1875, the area grew rapidly. Travel from Toronto, Pittsburgh, and New York City became less a matter of endurance than expenditure. Trains regularly made the run from Toronto to Gravenhurst, where travellers and their luggage were transferred to the great steamers of the Muskoka Navigation Co, such as the Sagamo. Making regular stops up the lakes, including at Bracebridge, Beaumaris, and Port Carling, tourists could transfer to smaller ships, such as the Islander. These could reach smaller ports. Improving transportation links opened smaller or more remote upper Muskoka lakes (Fairy, Vernon, Mary, Peninsula and Lake of Bays) to tourism around the turn of the 20th century, with steamers out of Huntsville servicing hotels like Deerhurst on Peninsula Lake. The Portage Railway between Peninsula Lake and Lake of Bays enabled comparatively easy access to the latter, resulting in a blossoming of tourism there, with 21 hotels eventually springing up, among them notably the Wawa and Britannia hotels and perhaps culminating in the Bigwin Inn.

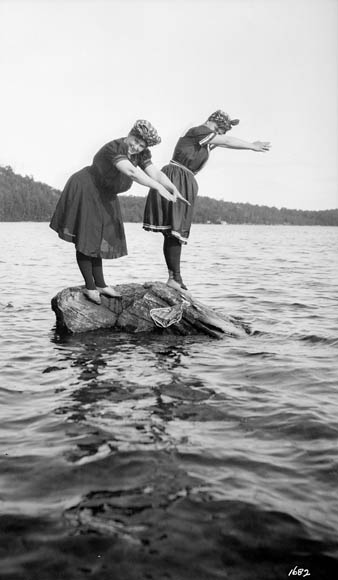
Photo of cottagers swimming in 1909, by F.W. Micklethwaite

The hotels became the centres of wealthy vacationers' lives, and families conducted extended stays that could stretch for weeks or months in the summer. As families became seasonally established, they began building cottages near the hotels; at first simple affairs replicating the rustic environment of the early camps. Later they built grander homes, including in some cases, housing for significant domestic staff. Initially cottagers relied on rowboats and canoes for daily transport and would sometimes row substantial distances. In the era of the steam and gasoline launch, tourists relied less on muscle power and more on motors. With the boats, the wealthier summer people built boathouses, often elaborate structures in their own right, in many cases designed with the look and feel of the main "cottage".

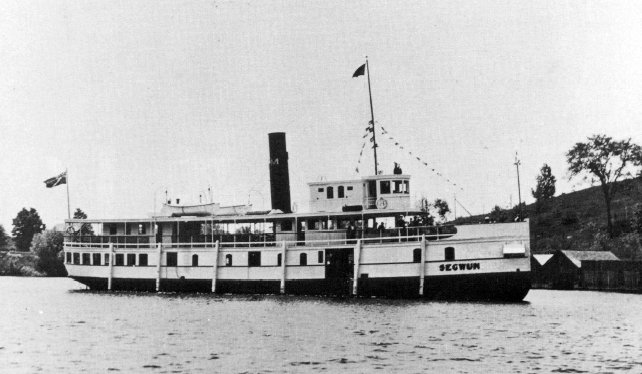
RMS Segwun on her maiden voyage to Bracebridge July 9, 1925.

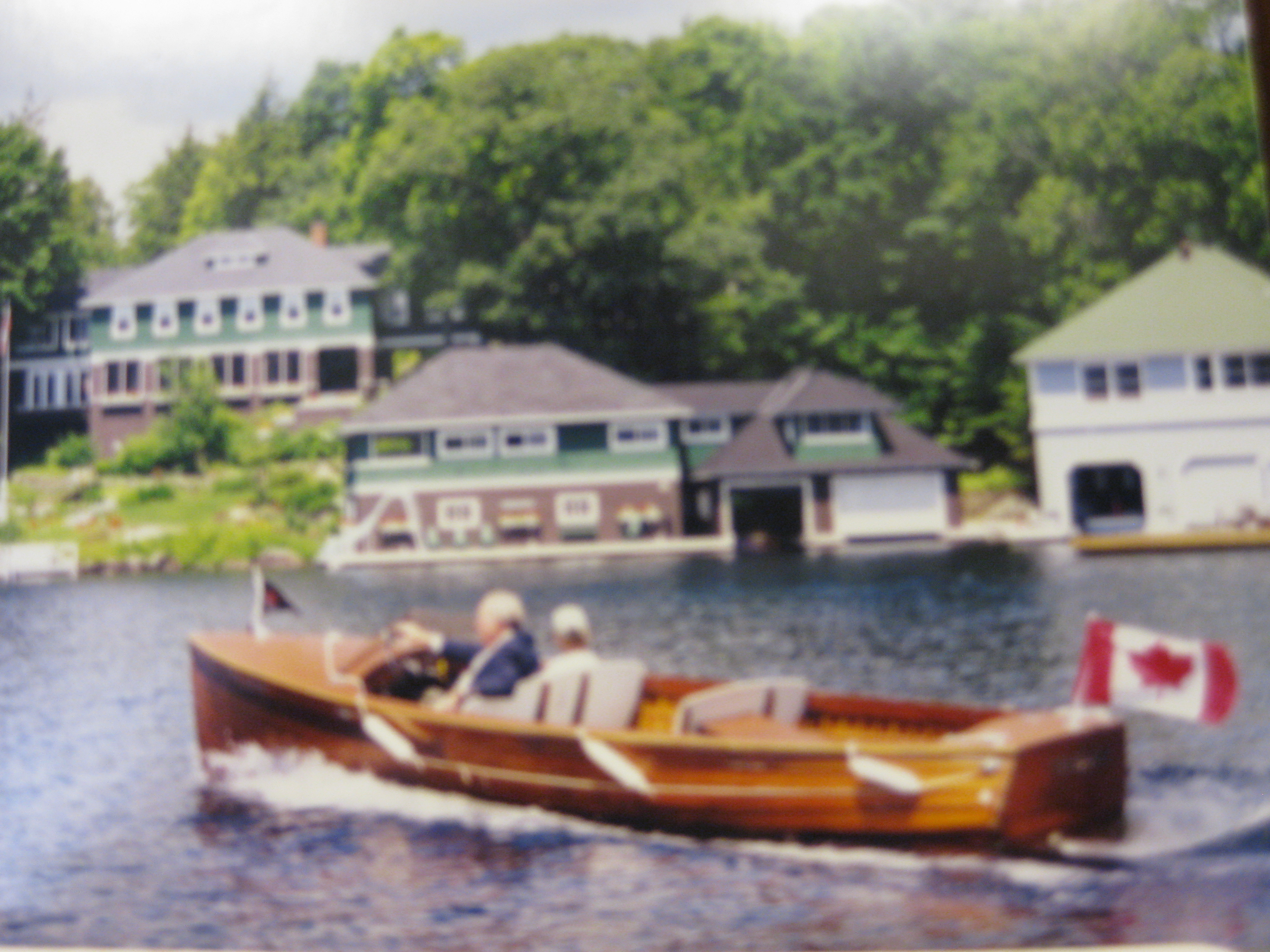
One of the different styles of Muskoka boats.

In 1887, the Nipissing II was built in Glasgow, Scotland and assembled in Gravenhurst, Ontario. Originally a side paddlewheel steamer, the Nipissing II plied the lakes of Muskoka for decades before decommission in 1914. In 1924, the vessel was outfitted with twin propeller engines and in 1925 was relaunched with an Ojibwe name, Segwun, meaning "springtime." Royal Mail Ship Segwun is still in operation today in Gravenhurst, Ontario, functioning as a pleasure cruise vessel and still delivering mail.

=== The coming of the car ===
World War I caused a significant dip in the tourist activity for the area and hence the economy. After the war, however, significant advances in the automobile brought demand for improved (paved) roads. These two developments, motorboats and private cars, brought greater overall development of the area. they also stimulated the spread of development around the lakes, as people no longer needed to be near major landings. Freed from the ports of call of the steamships, people built cottages farther afield. Demand began dropping for passenger billets on the steamship lines.

Meanwhile, demand increased for air transportation. The earliest runways of Muskoka Airport were laid out in 1933. The airport has been intermittently upgraded. It was used strategically during World War II as a training field for the Norwegian Air Force after the Nazi occupation of Norway.

The demands of World War II slowed residential development in this area. Wartime shortages kept many Americans at home and many Canadians were engaged in war activities. Postwar prosperity brought another boom based around the availability of the automobile, improved roads, and the newly affordable fiberglass boat. Suddenly owning a summer cottage became possible not only for the adventurous or the wealthy, but for many in the middle class. They traveled by private automobiles, and the steamship companies were forced to retire their ships one by one, until the last sailing in the late 1950s.

=== Evolution of local government ===
The District was formed from unorganized territory which was only partially surveyed into geographic townships by 1868. Surveying was completed in the coming years, and most, but not all, townships became organized municipally. The first townships were organized in 1869. In 1970, four geographic townships still existed in the District.

In 1873, the organized townships were formed into a municipality similar to a county, known as the "Municipal Corporation of the District of Muskoka." Its constituent municipalities were:

- Township of Humphrey
- United Townships of Medora and Wood
- United Townships of McLean and Ridout
- United Townships of Stisted, Chaffey, Brunel and Franklin
- United Townships of Cardwell and Watt
- Township of Monck
- Township of Morrison
- United Townships of Draper, Oakley and Ryde
- Township of Macauley
- Township of Stevenson

Its authority did not extend to the geographic townships. Provision was made in 1888 for a procedure to erect the District into a provisional county, but it was never invoked and was quietly repealed in 1911.

The District, unlike a county in Ontario, did not initially have the status of being a separate judicial district. Such an identity followed that for municipal purposes until 1888, when it became part of the "United Provisional Judicial District of Muskoka and Parry Sound", but it did have its own District Court and Surrogate Court This would continue until 1899, when Muskoka and Parry Sound were divided into separate provisional judicial districts.

In 1967, the Muskoka District Council was advised that J.W. Spooner, Ontario's Minister of Municipal Affairs, had appointed Donald M. Paterson to conduct a review of the District's local government arrangements. The report was released in June 1969, and its recommendations were substantially adopted by the new Minister Darcy McKeough, and subsequently implemented in January 1971, when the entire District was formally established as an upper-tier municipality consisting of the following municipalities:

Formation of the District of Muskoka
Area municipality	Constituted from
Town of Bracebridge	Town of Bracebridge; townships of Oakley, Macauley and Draper; parts of the townships of Monck, Muskoka and McLean
Town of Gravenhurst	Town of Gravenhurst; townships of Morrison and Ryde; parts of the townships of Muskoka and Wood
Town of Huntsville	Town of Huntsville; Village of Port Sydney; townships of Brunel, Chaffey, Stidted and Stephenson
Township of Georgian Bay	Township of Freeman; geographic townships of Gibson and Baxter
Township of Lake of Bays	townships of Franklin and Ridout; geographic township of Sinclair; part of the township of McLean; part of the geographic township of Finlayson
Township of Muskoka Lakes	Town of Bala; villages of Port Carling and Windermere; townships of Cardwell and Watt; parts of the township of Medora and Wood and the township of Monck

== Geography ==
=== Subdivisions ===
There are six municipalities in Muskoka (in descending order of population):

- Town of Huntsville
- Town of Bracebridge
- Town of Gravenhurst
- Township of Muskoka Lakes
- Township of Lake of Bays
- Township of Georgian Bay

The aboriginal reserves Wahta Mohawk Territory and Moose Point 79 are in the Muskoka census division but are independent of the District Municipality.

== Demographics ==
As a census division in the 2021 Census of Population conducted by Statistics Canada, the District Municipality of Muskoka had a population of 66,674 living in 28,571 of its 47,560 total private dwellings, a change of 10% from its 2016 population of 60,614. With a land area of 3,839.47 km^{2} (1,482.43 sq mi), it had a population density of 17.4/km^{2} (45.0/sq mi) in 2021.

Canada census – Muskoka community profile

	2021	2016	2011
Population	66,674 (+10.0% from 2016)	60,599 (4.5% from 2011)	58,047 (0.8% from 2006)
Land area	3,839.47 km^{2} (1,482.43 sq mi)	3,940.48 km^{2} (1,521.43 sq mi)	3,937.76 km^{2} (1,520.38 sq mi)
Population density	17.4/km^{2} (45/sq mi)	15.4/km^{2} (40/sq mi)	14.7/km^{2} (38/sq mi)
Median age	52.8 (M: 52.0, F: 54.0)	51.3 (M: 50.4, F: 52.1)	48.0 (M: 46.9, F: 49.0)
Private dwellings	47,560 (total) 28,571 (occupied)	46,207 (total) 25,431 (occupied)	44,619 (total) 23,646 (occupied)
Median household income	$83,000	$67,880	$60,587

Notes: Excludes census data for incompletely enumerated Indian reserves.
References: 2021 2016 2011

Historical census populations – District Municipality of Muskoka

Year	Pop.	±%
1976	36,691	—
1981	38,370	+4.6%
1986	40,235	+4.9%
1991	48,005	+19.3%
1996	50,463	+5.1%

Year	Pop.	±%
2001	53,106	+5.2%
2006	57,563	+8.4%
2011	58,047	+0.8%
2016	60,614	+4.4%
2021	66,674	+10.0%

2016 Population figure based on revised count. Excludes census data for incompletely enumerated Indian reserves.
Source: Statistics Canada

== Notable people ==
- Henry Norman Bethune (1890–1939), thoracic surgeon and medical innovator; born in Gravenhurst.
- James K. Bartleman (1939–2023), diplomat and 27th Lieutenant Governor of Ontario; raised in Port Carling (Muskoka Lakes).
- Dara Howell (b. 1994), Olympic gold medallist in freestyle skiing; born and based in Huntsville.
- Rene M. Caisse (1888–1978), nurse who operated a clinic in Bracebridge and popularized the Essiac herbal remedy.
- Mary Harron (b. 1953), film director and screenwriter; born in Bracebridge.
- Deric Ruttan (b. 1972), country singer–songwriter; from Bracebridge.
- Frank Carson (1902–1957), NHL right wing and 1926 Stanley Cup champion; born in Bracebridge.
- Matt Hickey, paramedic; recipient of the Ontario Medal for Paramedic Bravery (2024).

== In popular culture ==
Several seasons of the Canadian animated series Total Drama (namely Total Drama Island, Total Drama: Revenge of the Island, Total Drama All-Stars, and the 2023 TDI reboot) take place in an unidentified part of Muskoka, at a fictional abandoned island summer camp known as Camp Wawanakwa. The fictional Boney Island is also located in Muskoka.

== See also ==
- List of municipalities in Ontario
- List of townships in Ontario
- St. Elmo
- List of secondary schools in Ontario#District Municipality of Muskoka
