= Meneely bell foundries =

Foundries in New York State, US

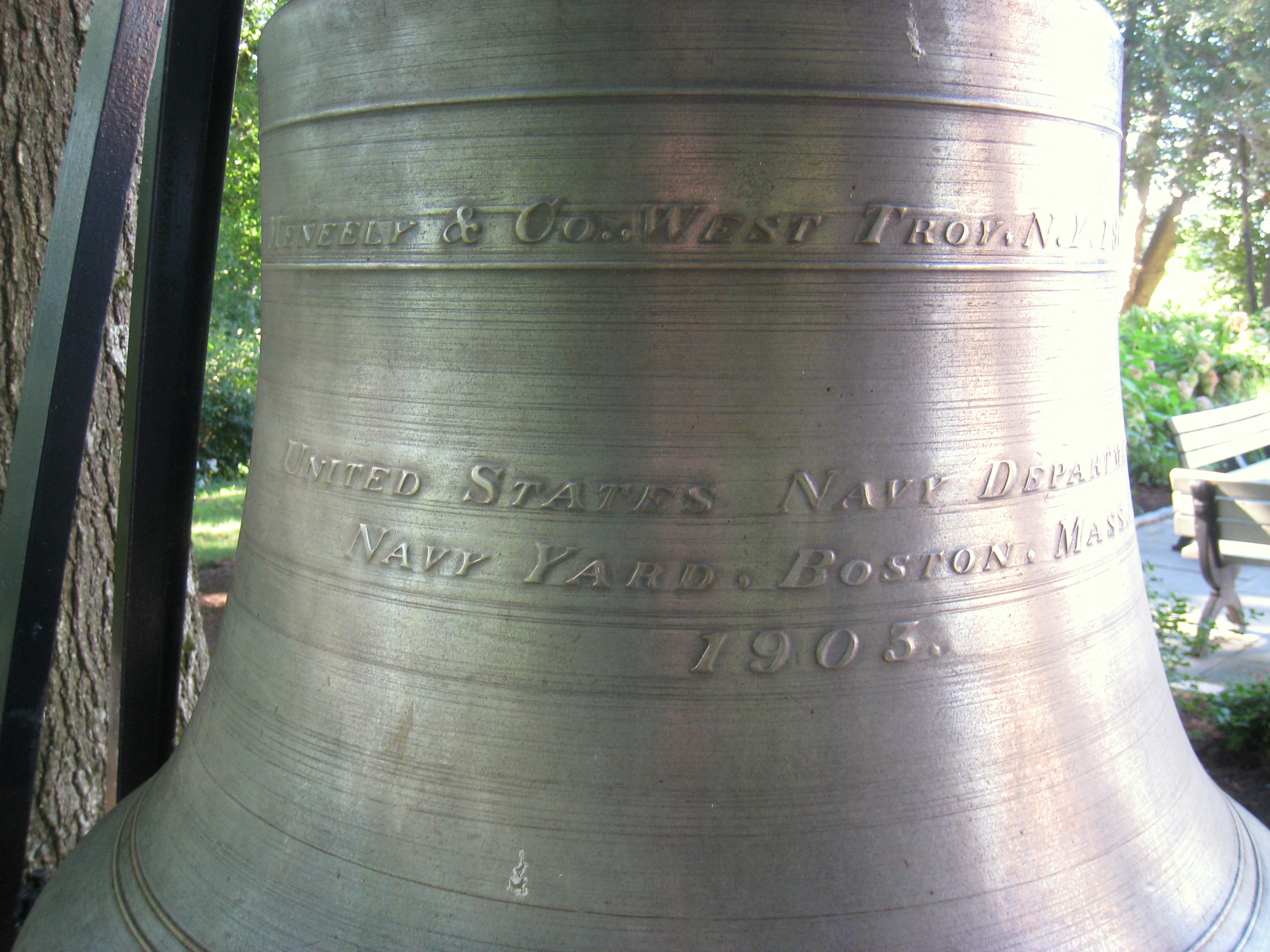
A Meneely bell at the Hellenic College and Holy Cross Greek Orthodox School of Theology in Brookline, Massachusetts

The Meneely Bell Foundry was a bell foundry established in 1826 in West Troy (now Watervliet), New York, by Andrew Meneely. Two of Andrew's sons continued to operate the foundry after his death, while a third son, Clinton H. Meneely, opened a second foundry across the river with George H. Kimberly in Troy, New York in 1870. Initially named the Meneely Bell Company of Troy, this second foundry was reorganized in 1880 as the Clinton H. Meneely Company, then again as the Meneely Bell Company. Together, the two foundries produced about 65,000 bells before they closed in 1952.

== Bell locations ==
=== Meneely Bell Foundry ===
Selected bells attributed to the West Troy foundry.

Site	Image	Dates	Location	Country	Description
Boys' Camp, Camp Mini-Yo-We			Huntsville, Ontario	Canada	Originally cast for Mountainside Gospel Chapel in Mountainside, New Jersey. Later donated to Camp Mini-Yo-We upon amalgamation with Liquid Church.
St. Lawrence Hall		1849 cast	Toronto, Ontario	Canada	Unused and virtually inaccessible in the cupola
Wesley Knox United Church			Woodville, Nova Scotia	Canada	
Roddick Gates, McGill University			Montreal, Quebec	Canada	
Saint Anthony's Church (Svateho Antonina)		1918 purchased	Strossmayerovo Namesti, Prague	Czech Republic	
First Baptist Church		1869 cast 1887 repaired 1963 moved	Huntsville, Alabama	United States	Donated by deacon James Hamilton to Enon Baptist Church downtown. Later moved to current site.
Church of the Nativity			Menlo Park, California	United States	
Saint Joseph Parish (Mountain View, California)			Mountain View, California	United States	Striker replaced in 2018. A-frames scheduled for replacement in 2024.
San Jose State University		1881 cast Rehung 1910 and 1960s	San Jose, California	United States	Cast to commemorate the California State Normal School. Weighs 3,000-pounds. Silenced after an earthquake in 1903. Re-installed in Tower Hall in 1910 and rung on special occasions. Later retired and relocated to ground level due to seismic concerns.
St. Mary Catholic Church			Bethel, Connecticut	United States	
Bulkley Memorial Carillon			Danbury, Connecticut	United States	
Lupton Hall Carillon, Oglethorpe University			Atlanta, Georgia	United States	
Faith Chapel		1901 cast	Jekyll Island, Georgia	United States	Chapel built 1904
Lovely Lane Chapel, Epworth By The Sea		1881 cast	St. Simons Island, Georgia	United States	
Lacon Congregational Church		1890 cast	Lacon, Illinois	United States	
St. Paul Lutheran Church		1860s purchased	Pontiac, Illinois	United States	
Rock Island Arsenal Clock Tower		1867 cast	Rock Island, Illinois	United States	Weighs 3,538 pounds
University of Northern Iowa		1926 dedicated	Cedar Falls, Iowa	United States	
Mattawamkeag Church of God			Mattawamkeag, Maine	United States	
Joseph Dill Baker Memorial Carillon			Frederick, Maryland	United States	Baker Park
Plainville Historical Commission		1905 cast	Plainville, Massachusetts	United States	
First Presbyterian Church of Saline		1846 cast	Saline, Michigan	United States	Weighs 1601 pounds. After installation, rang in the New Year of 1847 in New York. Rang in the new location in Saline, MI in 1898. Mounted approx. 60ft high on 8x8 timber.
Laingsburg United Methodist Church		1881 cast	Laingsburg, Michigan	United States	
Immanuel Lutheran Church			Madison, Nebraska	United States	
Thompson Hall (University of New Hampshire)			Durham, New Hampshire	United States	Original church was located on Greenwood Ave. Later relocated behind the "new" church on Dodgingtown Road.
Columbia High School (New Jersey)			Maplewood, New Jersey	United States	Large bell chimes the hour
St. Peter the Apostle Roman Catholic Church			New Brunswick, New Jersey	United States	
Newton Presbyterian Church			Newton, New Jersey	United States	
First United Methodist Church of Toms River		1853 cast	Toms River, New Jersey	United States	Cast for Second Church Building. Moved to Third Church Building in 1874. Moved to Fourth Church Building in 1970s.
Friendship Fire Company #1		1875 cast	Woodbury, New Jersey	United States	Created for the Woodbury Fire Association
Reformed Dutch Church of Claverack			Claverack-Red Mills, New York	United States	
Saint Michael's Church (Rochester, New York)		1847 cast	Rochester, New York	United States	2 bells weighing 1,015 pounds and 525 pounds
St. Anthony's Church			Albany, New York	United States	
First Presbyterian Church		1848 cast	Avon, New York	United States	33", 700 pound bell
First Presbyterian Church		Purchased 1834	Ballston Spa, New York	United States	Purchased for $100 on March 4, 1834
Carlisle Presbyterian Church			Carlisle, New York	United States	
Central United Methodist Church			Endicott, New York	United States	
Jamesville Community Museum			Jamesville, New York	United States	Created for the former 1878 Episcopal church
St. Andrew's Catholic Church			Norwood, New York	United States	3,100-pound bell of ingot copper and East India tin
Church of the Ascension		1873 cast 1888 resold	Rockville Centre, New York	United States	Cast for Christ Church, Poughkeepsie, New York. Sold back to the foundry and resold to Church of the Ascension.
Saugerties Lighthouse			Saugerties, New York	United States	
Phi Sigma Kappa, Gamma Tetarton Chapter (Troy, NY)		1882 dedicated	Troy, New York	United States	The building was originally St. Francis DeSales Church. Dedicated by Rev. William A. Drum.
Vernon Center Presbyterian Church		1844 cast	Vernon Center, New York	United States	
West Point Cadet Chapel			West Point, New York	United States	
King Avenue United Methodist Church			Columbus, Ohio	United States	
Mt. Zion Baptist Church			Portland, Oregon	United States	Formerly Deutsche Congregationale Zion Kirche (German Congregational Zion Church)
St. Peter Cathedral (Erie, Pennsylvania)			Erie, Pennsylvania	United States	
Christ Episcopal Church (Reading, Pennsylvania)		1874 cast	Reading, Pennsylvania	United States	Set of 10 bells
Trinity Church (Newport, Rhode Island)			Newport, Rhode Island	United States	
National Patriots Bell Tower carillon			Valley Forge National Park, Pennsylvania	United States	
St. Matthew's German Evangelical Lutheran Church		1901 cast 3 bells added 1966	Charleston, South Carolina	United States	Set of 10 bells. All bells refurbished in 2008 by Christop Paccard Bellfoundries.
Wofford College			Spartanburg, South Carolina	United States	
First United Methodist Church (Crockett, Texas)		1859 cast 1901 moved	Crockett, Texas	United States	
Saint Stephen's Episcopal Church			Sherman, Texas	United States	
Cathedral Church of St. Mark			Salt Lake City, Utah	United States	
Saint Peter's Catholic Church			Rutland, Vermont	United States	
Wilder Center			Wilder, Vermont	United States	
Eastern State Hospital Medical Library, Building No. 3		1866 cast	Williamsburg, Virginia	United States	Signified curfews and special events at the nation's oldest psychiatric hospital

=== Second Meneely bell foundry ===
Selected bells attributed to the Troy foundry:

- Meneely & Kimberly
- Meneely Bell Company of Troy
- Clinton H. Meneely Company
- Meneely Bell Company

Site	Image	Dates	Location	Country	Description
St. Andrew's United Church			Markham, Ontario	Canada	
Sainte-Marthe-De-Vaudreuil Catholic Church			Quebec	Canada	
Parish Church of San Andres Xecul			Totonicapan	Guatemala	
Hume Memorial Church (A.F.C.C) Congregation		1914 cast	Ahmednagar, Maharashtra	India	
Tunghai University			Taichung	Taiwan	Cast for Miss Elsie Priest
Veterans Park		1874 cast 2010 installed	Poway, California	United States	
Schofield Barracks Soldiers Chapel		1911 cast	Wahiawa, Hawaii	United States	
Davis County Courthouse		1879 cast	Bloomfield, Iowa	United States	Meneely & Kimberly
St. Patrick's Catholic Church		1910 cast	Ogden, Kansas	United States	
First Baptist Church		1859 cast	Clinton, Louisiana	United States	
Cushing Academy		1890 cast	Ashburnham, Massachusetts	United States	Clinton H. Meneely
Minneapolis City Hall		1895 cast 1924 cast	Minneapolis, Minnesota	United States	10 bells cast in 1895 4 bells cast in 1924 1 bell supplemented from Petit & Fritzen in 1972
St. Joseph's Catholic Church		1918	Waite Park, Minnesota	United States	MeNeely Bell Company
Church of the Sacred Heart		1872 cast	Waseca, Minnesota	United States	Meneely & Kimberly
Jasper County Courthouse (Missouri)	Jasper County Courthouse Bell from Meneely Bell Company	1895 cast	Carthage, Missouri	United States	
Billings First Congregational Church		1889 cast 1957 rehung	Billings, Montana	United States	Clinton H. Meneely
Wells College, Main Building		1922 cast	Aurora, New York	United States	9 bells
St. Ann & the Holy Trinity Church			Brooklyn, New York	United States	
Assumption Church		1922 dedicated	Staten Island, New York	United States	
Morehead-Patterson Bell Tower		1930s cast	Chapel Hill, North Carolina	United States	Meneely Bell Company. 12 bells supplemented by two bells from Petit & Fritsen in 1998.
Cortland Elementary School		1876 cast	Cortland, Ohio	United States	Meneely & Kimberly
Phelps School			Malvern, Pennsylvania	United States	The "Victory Bell"
Spartanburg Town Bell		1880 cast 2026 restored	Spartanburg, South Carolina	United States	Opera House 1881-1907, County Courthouse 1907-1958, storage 1958-1979, freestanding clock tower 1979-2025, currently on display in downtown library. Weighs 1,200 pounds.
University of Washington, Denny Hall		1861 cast	Seattle, Washington	United States	The Denny Bell

== Notable bells ==
Ein Feste Burg on Meneely Bells
A Mighty Fortress Is Our God on the Meneely Bell Foundry (1901) bell set at St. Matthew's German Evangelical Lutheran Church in Charleston, South Carolina

=== Columbian Liberty Bell ===
Harr Wagner received a letter from William Osborne McDowell, stating that his wife, Madge Morris Wagner was appointed honorary member of the committee to create and direct the use of the Columbian Liberty Bell to be rung at the World's Fair. The bell was to be made up of slaves' chains from all parts of the world and contributions of silver, gold and copper money. It was to be cast at Troy, New York. The idea, expressed in one of Wagner's poems, was adopted as the fundamental motive in the casting of the bell, hence her appointment to an honorary position on the committee having the work in charge.

The Columbian Liberty Bell was cast by Clinton H. Meneely's foundry for display at the World's Columbian Exposition in Chicago in 1893. The bell disappeared while on tour in Europe.

=== Saint Anthony’s Church Bell, Prague, Czech Republic ===
The Meneely bell that hangs in St Anthony's Church in Prague was purchased by the Mid-European Union in October 1918 to commemorate the independence of Czechoslovakia after World War I and donated to the group's president, Thomas Masaryk, who became the head of the country's provisional government and, in 1920, the Czechoslovak president. The bell cost $2,000 and weighed 2,542 pounds (1,155 kg).

== See also ==
- Benjamin Hanks (1755–1824), goldsmith and instrument maker
- Campanology: Carillons (a concise chapter in the general article Campanology)
- Bell tower
