= National Register of Historic Places listings in Houston County, Texas =

Location of Houston County in Texas

This is a list of the National Register of Historic Places listings in Houston County, Texas.

This is intended to be a complete list of properties listed on the National Register of Historic Places in Houston County, Texas. There are seven properties listed on the National Register in the county. Three properties are Recorded Texas Historic Landmarks including one that is also a State Antiquities Landmark.

This National Park Service list is complete through NPS recent listings posted March 21, 2025.

== Current listings ==
The publicly disclosed locations of National Register properties may be seen in a mapping service provided.

	Name on the Register	Image	Date listed	Location	City or town	Description
1	Downes-Aldrich House	Downes-Aldrich House	April 19, 1978 (#78002957)	206 N. 7th St. 31°19′10″N 95°27′16″W	Crockett	Recorded Texas Historic Landmark
2	First United Methodist Church	First United Methodist Church	March 21, 2011 (#11000133)	701 E Goliad Ave; 31°19′03″N 95°27′17″W	Crockett	
3	Houston County Courthouse	Houston County Courthouse	May 10, 2010 (#10000248)	401 E Houston Ave. 31°19′05″N 95°27′27″W	Crockett	State Antiquities Landmark, Recorded Texas Historic Landmark
4	Mary Allen Seminary for Colored Girls, Administration Building	Mary Allen Seminary for Colored Girls, Administration Building	May 12, 1983 (#83004514)	803 N. 4th St. 31°19′38″N 95°27′41″W	Crockett	
5	Monroe-Crook House	Monroe-Crook House	March 31, 1971 (#71000940)	707 E. Houston St. 31°19′08″N 95°27′15″W	Crockett	Recorded Texas Historic Landmark
6	Swale at Mission Tejas State Park		May 30, 2019 (#100003971)	Address Restricted	Grapeland vicinity	
7	Westerman Mound	Westerman Mound	June 21, 1971 (#71000941)	Address restricted	Kennard	

== See also ==
- National Register of Historic Places listings in Texas
- Recorded Texas Historic Landmarks in Houston County
