= First United Methodist Church (Crockett, Texas) =

Historic church in Texas, United States

- U.S. National Register of Historic Places
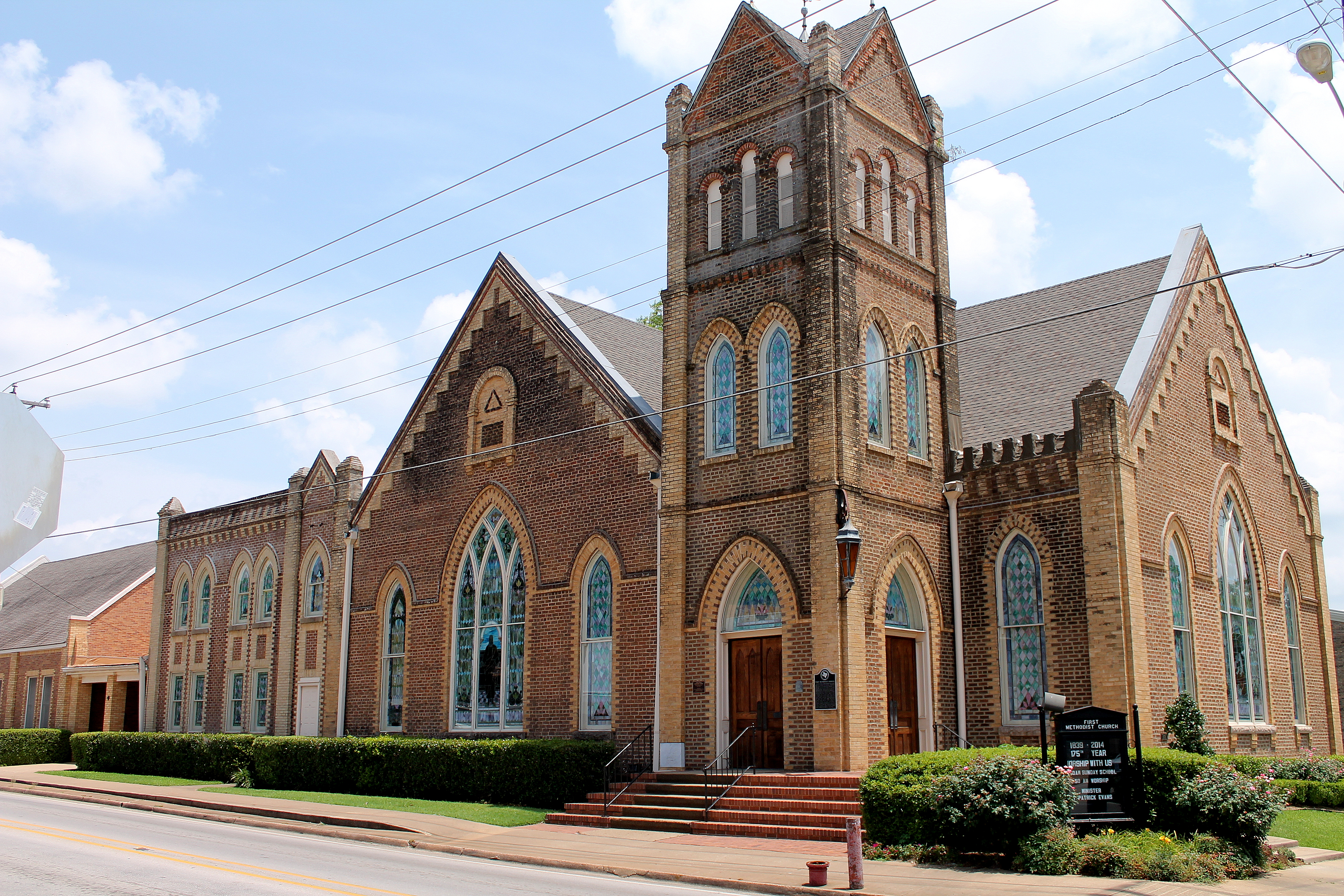
- Location: 701 E Goliad Ave; Crockett, Texas
- Coordinates: 33°19′03″N 95°27′17.25″W
- Area: less than one acre
- Built: 1901
- Architect: Richard Cassidy
- Architectural style: Gothic Revival
- MPS: Churches with Decorative Interior Painting TR
- NRHP reference No.: 11000133
- Added to NRHP: March 21, 2011

First United Methodist Church is a historic church at 701 E Goliad Ave in Crockett, Texas. First United Methodist Church in Crockett, Texas was organized on December 23, 1839, by the Texas Mission of the Mississippi Methodist Conference by Littleton Fowler. It is one of the oldest continuously operating Methodist congregation in Texas. The land where the church is located was purchased by the Methodist congregation in 1858. The church building was placed on the National Register of Historic Places on March 21, 2011.

The cornerstone of the current church building was laid in 1901. Several families in the church gave memorial gifts of stained-glass windows. The windows were most likely crafted in Bavaria, shipped to Galveston and then transported to Crockett via rail. They were then installed by artisans who were likely experienced in the technique of installing stained glass in 1902.There are a total of nineteen stained-glass windows in the church, with one of the most notable being a gift from two brothers who had lost their mother, wives, and children in the Galveston hurricane of 1900.

The interior of the church sanctuary is in the Akron style, meaning it has curved rows and no center aisle. The bell in the church tower was salvaged from the wooden church building which burned in 1870. The bell, a 22-inch Meneely cast bronze, came from Troy, New York in 1859 and is still rung each Sunday. In 1915, a pipe organ was specifically built for the church by Estey Organ Company in Brattleboro, Vermont. It has undergone several renovations, including the installation of a computer board to open the pipes, and is used in worship services.

Additions to the church building were made in 1922 to provide offices and classrooms and in 1953 to add a fellowship hall and additional classrooms. In 1968 additional classrooms were built, and in 1998 a Family Life Center with a gym and meeting rooms was added.

Denominations

In 1839, this church was part of the Methodist Episcopal Church of America. When the Methodist Episcopal Church South was formed in 1845, the congregation in Crockett joined with it. In 1939, the Methodist church reunited several denominations, and the church in Crockett became a part of The Methodist Church. In 1968, The Methodist Church merged with the Evangelical United Brethren Church to form the United Methodist Church. In 2022, the Crockett congregation voted to remain a part of the United Methodist Church.

== See also ==
- National Register of Historic Places listings in Houston County, Texas
