= James Carroll (actor) =

Canadian actor and radio personality

- Born: James Aloysius Carroll; December 20, 1955; Philadelphia, Pennsylvania, United States
- Died: April 27, 2016 (aged 60); Algonquin Grace Residential Hospice in Huntsville, Ontario, Canada
- Education: La Salle University, Villanova University
- Occupations: Actor, Radio Presenter
- Years active: 1970s–2016
- Children: 1

James "Jimmy" Carroll (December 20, 1955 – April 27, 2016) was an American-born Canadian actor and radio personality, best known for playing Max Sutton on Wind at My Back, which aired on CBC Television from 1996 to 2001. Most recently, Carroll found a second career as a community radio host and personality based in Huntsville, Ontario. Carroll initially joined Hunters Bay Radio (CKAR-FM) in 2010 as the host of a local afternoon radio show. However, he soon became involved in the growth of the community station, hosting a Top 20 countdown, a Motown show on Mondays, and a local talent show. Carroll helped Hunters Bay Radio expand from its origins as a small, online station broadcast from a household basement into a full FM radio station with a staff of 60 employees by 2016.

== Early life and career ==
Carroll was born in Philadelphia, Pennsylvania, in the United States. He moved from the U.S. to Toronto during the 1980s after performing in stage productions in the Canadian city. In addition to acting, Carroll later worked as the stage manager at The Second City improv club in Toronto. His other television roles included Anne of Green Gables: A New Beginning in 2008, as well as commercials.

Carroll originally left the entertainment industry and moved to Huntsville, Ontario, to live closer to his daughter Emma. He soon became involved with Hunters Bay Radio, the local community radio station, as an afternoon host in 2010. Carroll and his colleagues oversaw the expansion of Hunters Bay Radio into a full FM station with 60 employees, which now broadcasts across Muskoka's cottage country and the Almaguin Highlands.

== Illness and death ==
Carroll was diagnosed with cancer in December 2015. Local Huntsville residents raised $22,000 for his medical expenses through a GoFundMe campaign. Many of Carroll's former acting colleagues held a benefit for him at the Algonquin Theatre in Huntsville in January 2016. Carroll was hospitalized in April 2016 as his health declined. Carroll died from complications from small cell lung cancer on April 27, 2016, at the age of 60.

== Filmography ==
=== Film ===
- Police Academy 4: Citizens on Patrol (1987) - Warehouse Supplier
- Dirty Work (1998) - Middle-Aged Guy
- Death to Smoochy (2002) - Reporter #2
- Deep Sea 4D (2003) - Dive Master Jim Marx
- DC 9/11: Time of Crisis (2003) - Robert Mueller
- Anne of Green Gables: A New Beginning (2008) - Jeremiah Land

=== Television ===
- Wind at My Back (1996-2001) - Max Sutton

=== Videogame ===
- Where in the U.S.A. Is Carmen Sandiego? (1996)
- Red Dead Redemption (2010) - Norman Deek
