= George Hunt (British Army officer) =

British Army officer

Captain George Hunt

Captain George Hunt (1830 – February 26, 1882) is credited as the founder of Huntsville, Ontario, Canada, in the region of Muskoka, where he settled in 1869.

== Biography ==
He was born in 1830 on the Isle of Corfu off the coast of Greece to British Army officer Robert Hunt and his wife Margaret. In 1840, the Hunt family moved to Canada, settling in Montreal, Province of Canada.

In 1855 he was commissioned an ensign, without purchase, in the 6th Foot.

In 1853, George married Sarah Selkirk, daughter of William and Allison Selkirk of Montreal. In 1856, George Hunt's cousin Elizabeth married George Selkirk. In 1869, both families traveled together to the unorganized township which was later to be known as Huntsville, Ontario.

Captain Hunt was a devout Presbyterian, and was known as a stern teetotaler. Captain Hunt took a prominent role in the first Presbyterian church built in 1873. He also opened the first school, retail store, postal outlet, and legal office.

Captain Hunt died in his fifty-second year from complications of pneumonia resulting from Typhoid fever on February 26, 1882. He is buried in the old Madill Church Cemetery just south of Huntsville.

== Development of Huntsville ==
On settling in the future Huntsville, Captain Hunt built a log cabin on what is now the north corner of Main and John Street, just east of the town swing bridge.

He supervised the incoming roadway and directed its course to create what is now the Main Street of Huntsville. He also supervised the extension of the northern highway beyond the town. His voice was instrumental in reversing a provincial government decision to route the northern railroad through either Parry Sound or Hoodstown, and sending it through Huntsville instead, thus securing the industrial expansion which followed and quickly grew the town's population and importance.

The railroad arrived in 1886, and the same year the village of Huntsville was incorporated, named after the late Captain Hunt.
