= Brewster Denny =

American academic (1924–2013)

- Born: Seattle, Washington, U.S.
- Died: Seattle, Washington, U.S.
- Citizenship: United States
- Education: Ph.D., Tufts University (1959); M.A., Harvard University (1948); B.A., University of Washington (1945)
- Occupation: Professor
- Children: Maria Denny
- Relatives: Arthur A. Denny (great-great grandfather)

Brewster Castberg Denny (1924 - June 22, 2013) was an American academic from Seattle, Washington, known for his long association with the University of Washington.

== Early life and education ==
The great-great-grandson of Seattle founder Arthur A. Denny, Brewster Denny graduated from Roosevelt High School in 1942 and the University of Washington in 1945, before joining the U.S. Navy. In the Navy, he was posted to Pearl Harbor, serving as an intelligence analyst in a unit preparing for the land invasion of Japan.

Denny left naval service at the end of the war and went on to earn a master's degree from Harvard University, and Ph.D. from Tufts University.

== Career ==
From 1952 to 1960, Denny was an intelligence analyst in the United States Department of Defense, and, in 1960 worked as a national security adviser on the presidential transition team of John F. Kennedy. He then served a year as a staff member with the U.S. Senate Subcommittee on National Policy Machinery and, in 1962, became the first director of the Graduate School of Public Affairs at the University of Washington, a post he held until 1980. In 1992 Denny was named dean emeritus, but continued teaching courses in American foreign policy.

Denny was named as a U.S. representative in the United Nations General Assembly in 1968. He served as a trustee of the Century Foundation, a member of the board of directors of the Seattle Historical Society, and as a vice-president of the Seattle Opera Association.

=== Varsity Bell ===
From 1961 until his death in 2013, Brewster Denny was responsible for the annual ringing of the Varsity Bell, a 400-pound (180 kg), 1861 bell installed at Denny Hall on the University of Washington campus, which is rung once per year, on Homecoming, to ceremonially summon the university's alumni to campus.

== Personal life ==
Denny married Patrica Virginia Sollitt in 1950 and, with her, had a daughter.

== Book ==
Denny was the author of the book Seeing American Foreign Policy Whole (University of Illinois Press, 1985).
