= Mary Allen Seminary =

Former college in Texas, United States

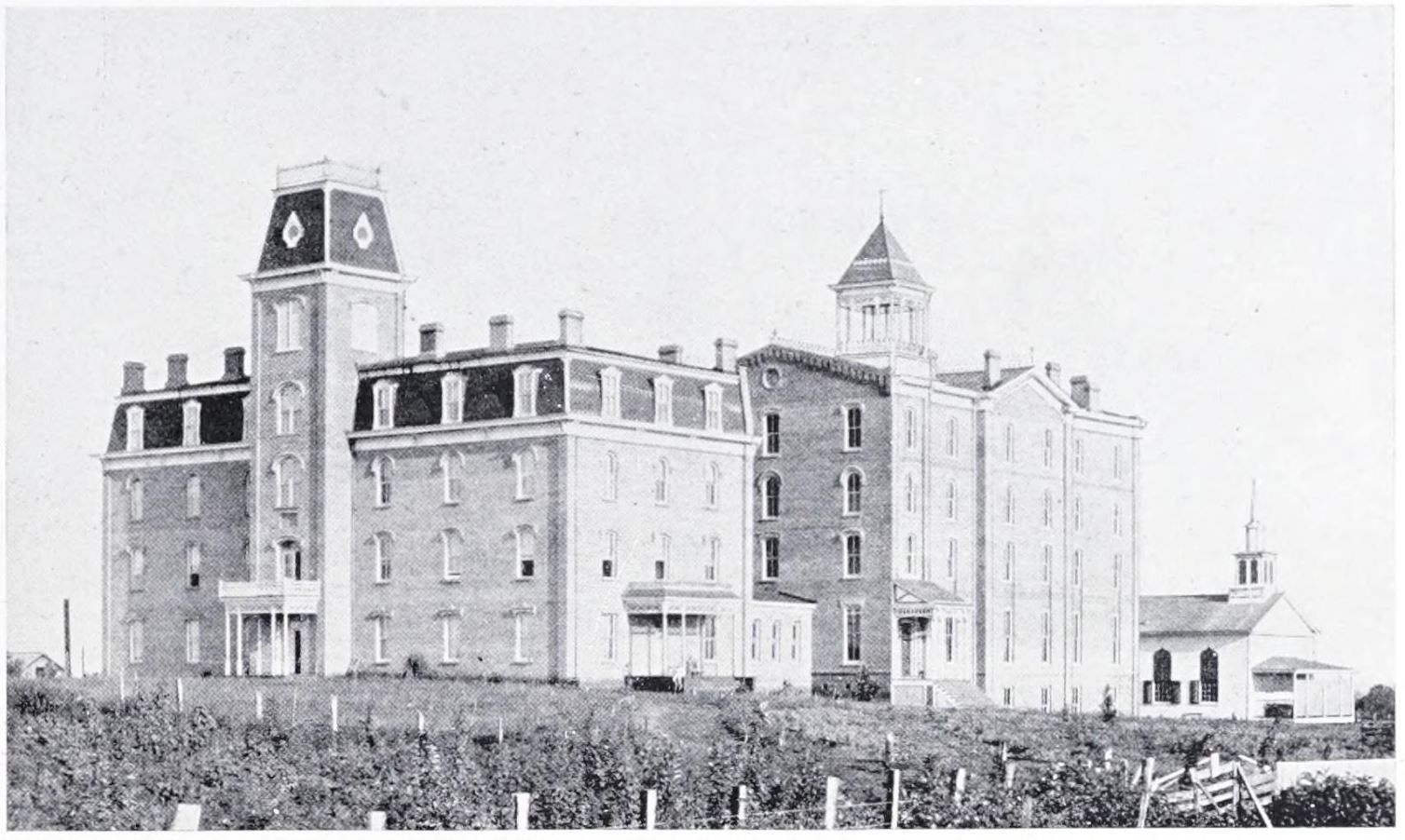
- The school c. 1910
- Former name: Mary Allen Junior College
- Active: 1886–1972
- Location: 803 N. 4th St., Crockett, Texas
- Mary Allen Seminary for Colored Girls, Administration Building
- U.S. National Register of Historic Places
- Location within Texas Location within the United States
- Coordinates: 31°19′38″N 95°27′41″W
- Area: 13 acres (5.3 ha)
- Built: 1886
- Architectural style: Second Empire
- NRHP reference No.: 83004514
- Added to NRHP: May 12, 1983

Mary Allen Seminary (later called Mary Allen Junior College) was the first black women's college in the state of Texas. Initially a parochial school founded and run by white Presbyterians, it was restructured in 1924 and became an accredited junior college with an all-black faculty and black administrator in 1933. The school was closed in 1943, reopened the following year, and operated until 1972.

== History ==
=== Seminary ===
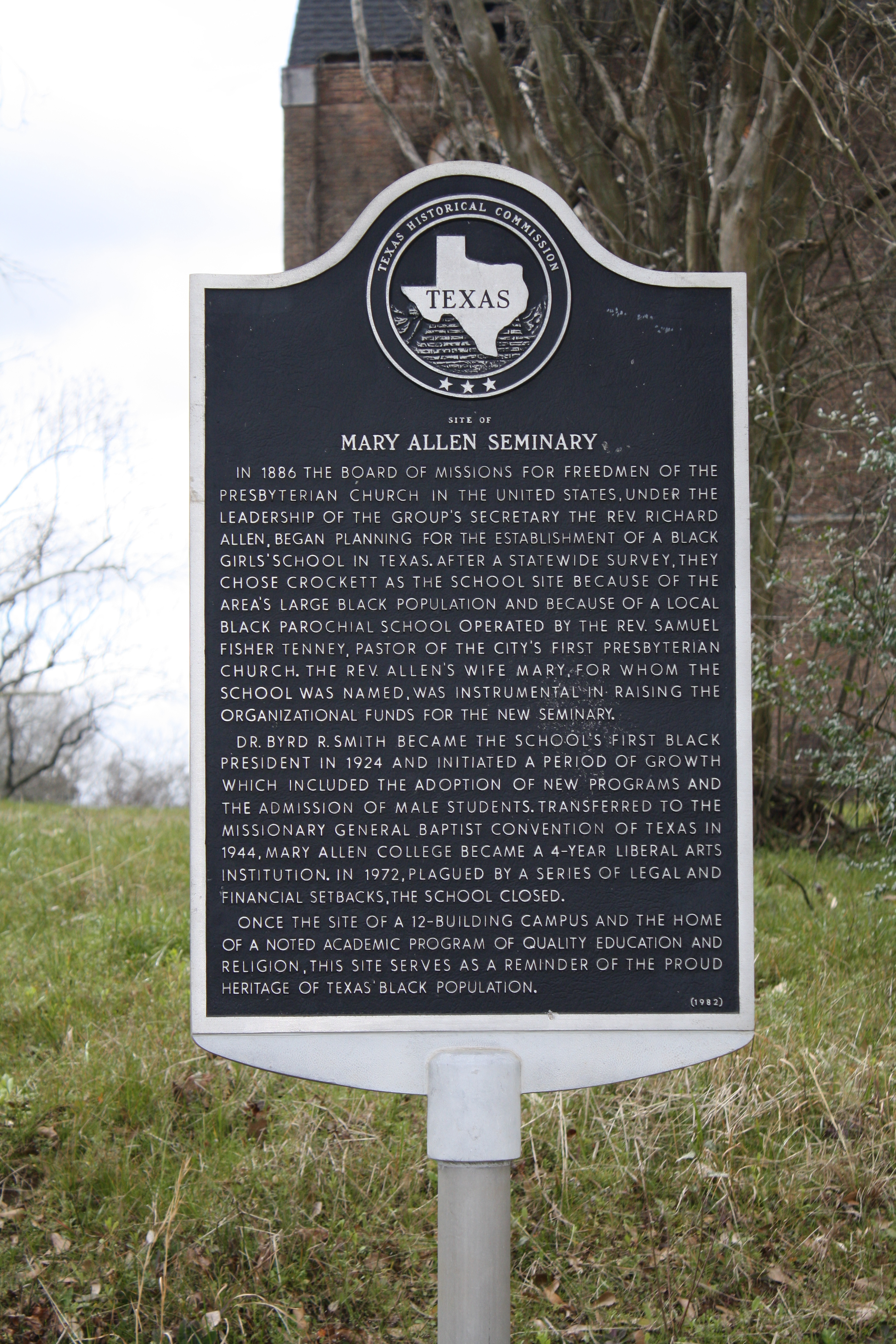
Mary Allen Seminary historic marker

The school was founded in Crockett, Texas in 1886 by the Presbyterian pastor Reverend Richard Allen, and his wife Mary E. Allen. At the time, it was the first and only school that was open to the nearly 200,000 freed black women in the state.

Planning for the institution was started in 1885 by the Board of Missions for Freedmen of the Presbyterian Church and was largely influenced by Mary, whose husband was the secretary of the board. The city of Crockett was chosen as the location for the school because the area had a large black population, and because a parochial school for black students was already located there. In January 1886, the first three teachers arrived in Crockett and settled in a rented farm to begin instruction. Mary died in April 1887, and the school was named in her honor.

At first the school provided a liberal arts education, but later, due to criticism that it and other institutions like it around the country were not providing black women with necessary vocational training, the curriculum shifted to subjects such as cooking, dressmaking, and millinery. By the end of its first year, the school had 46 students, and in that year a brick building was erected to house students and faculty. As enrollment grew over the subsequent years, citizens from Crockett and elsewhere in the United States began donating land and money to the school, and by 1891 the campus consisted of 260 acres of land and an additional brick hall, named after the benefactor, Michigan United States Senator James McMillan.

Though the students were all black, the faculty of the seminary was initially composed of white women. In 1921, a Presbyterian newspaper advertised the position of "white lady teachers" at the school, promising 44 dollars per month for an eight-month term, plus "maintenance and railroad fare both ways."

=== Junior college ===
In 1924, the Texas school board appointed the first black administrator, the Reverend Burt Randall Smith, to restructure Mary Allen Seminary. Over the next eight years, Smith oversaw an overhaul of the curriculum, including expansion of the library and science facilities, and in 1932 the school became an accredited junior college with an all-black faculty. In 1933, the school changed its name to Mary Allen Junior College and became a coeducational institution.

The school was closed in 1943 after a failed proposal to transform it into a black state college. In 1944, it was reopened by the National Missionary Baptist Convention of America and operated until 1972.

== See also ==
- National Register of Historic Places listings in Houston County, Texas
