= Varsity Bell =

Bell at educational institution

The Varsity Bell (also called the Denny Bell) is a large bell that, as of 2016, is installed in the cupola of Denny Hall at the University of Washington in Seattle, Washington.

The 400-pound (180 kg) bell was cast in Troy, New York in 1861 and purchased by the Territorial University of Washington for $368. It was shipped to Seattle, around the Cape Horn, to be installed in the original building of the university in 1862. After installation, its first ringing was conducted by Clarence Bagley on March 19, 1862.

During its service at the Territorial University, the bell was rung to announce the start of classes and also used to sound citywide alert at other critical moments: it solemnly tolled to mark the announcement of Abraham Lincoln's assassination; during the riot of 1886 it was used to call-out the militia; three years later it was rung to sound the alarm at the start of the Great Seattle Fire.

When the University relocated from its original downtown site to its current location in the 1890s, the bell was moved and installed in the new campus' first building, Denny Hall. From 1996 to 2005, the bell was removed from Denny Hall for restoration work.

In the 20th and 21st centuries, the bell has typically been rung only once annually, during Homecoming. From 1961, until his death in 2013, Brewster Denny was responsible for the annual ringing of the bell. (Note: Several Homecoming celebrations were canceled in the 1970s, at the height of the Vietnam War.) Since then, the bell has been rung by Denny's daughter.

== See also ==
- Cloke Plaza bell
