= Mid-European Union =

The Mid-European Union was a post-World War I political association established in the United States of America on 16 September 1918 "to negotiate territorial disputes between the emerging nations" of Central Europe "and to work towards some form of federal union or economic alliance."

President Wilson accepted a "Union" delegation with Thomas Garrigue Masaryk as the head and received its resolution in Friday 20 September 1918.

On 26 October 1918, Thomas Masaryk proclaimed the association's Declaration of Common Aims for the independence for the Czechoslovaks, Poles, Yugoslavs, Ukrainians, Uhro-Rusyns, Lithuanians, Romanians, Italian-Irredentists, Unredeemed Greeks, Albanians, Zionists, and Armenians. This occurred at a meeting in Philadelphia, Pennsylvania, at Independence Hall.

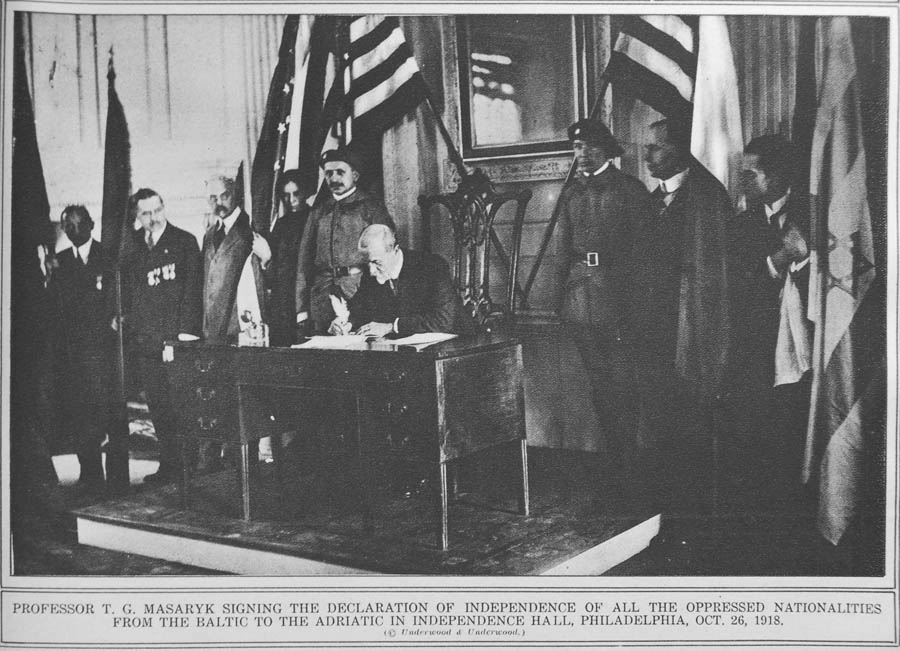
Masaryk Independence Hall 1sm

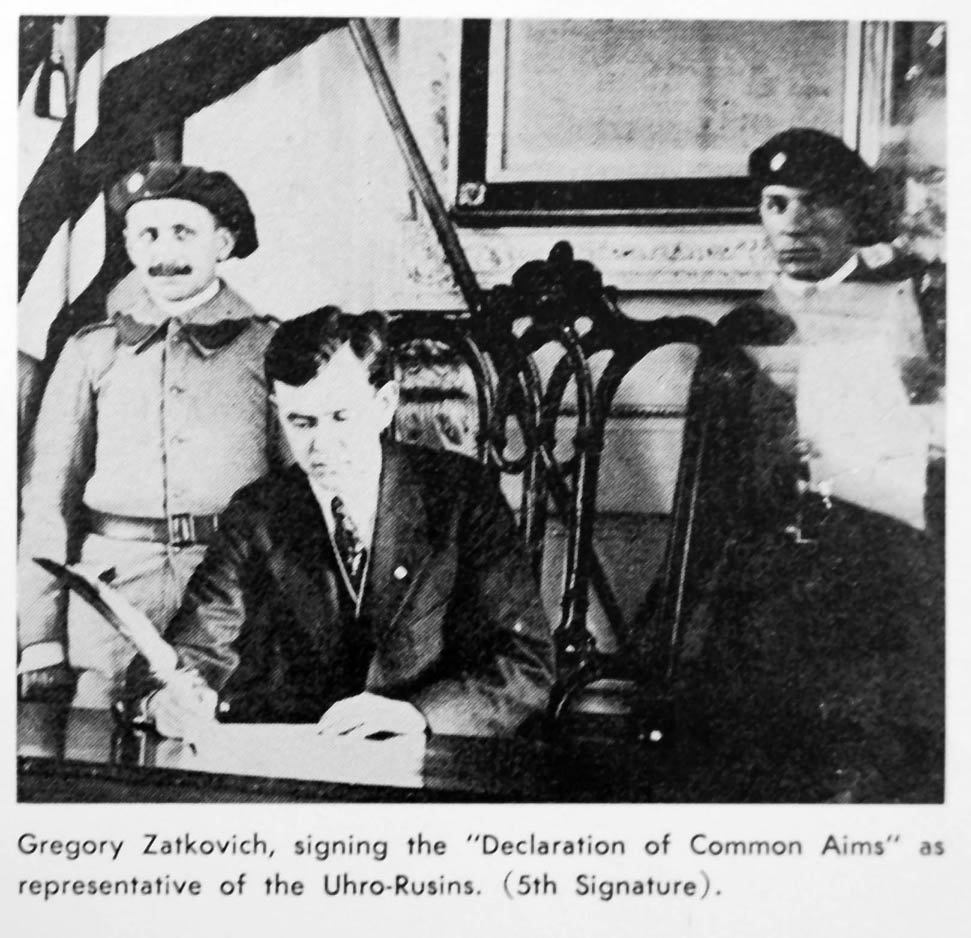
Zatkovich signing sm

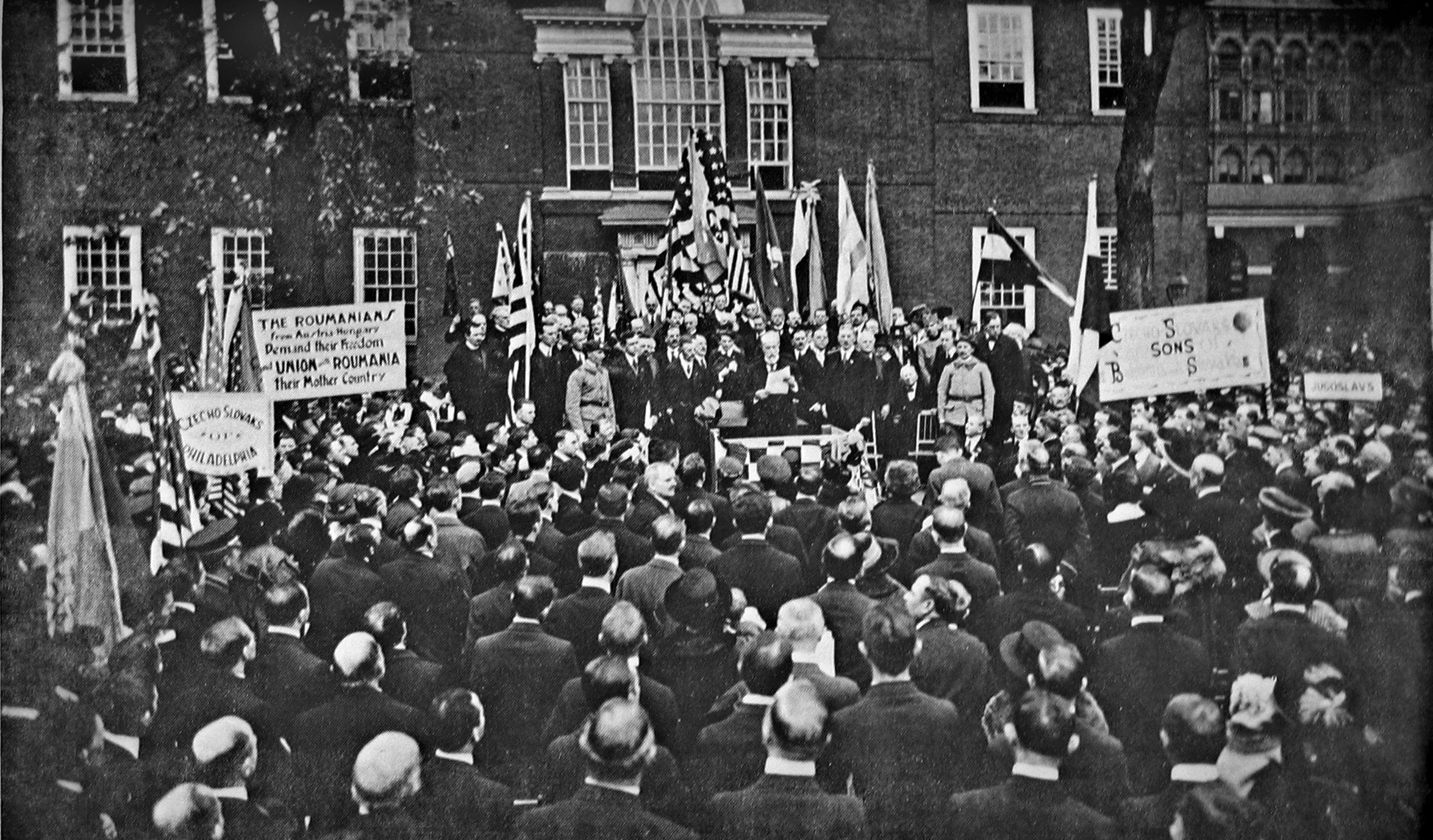
Masaryk Independence Hall2

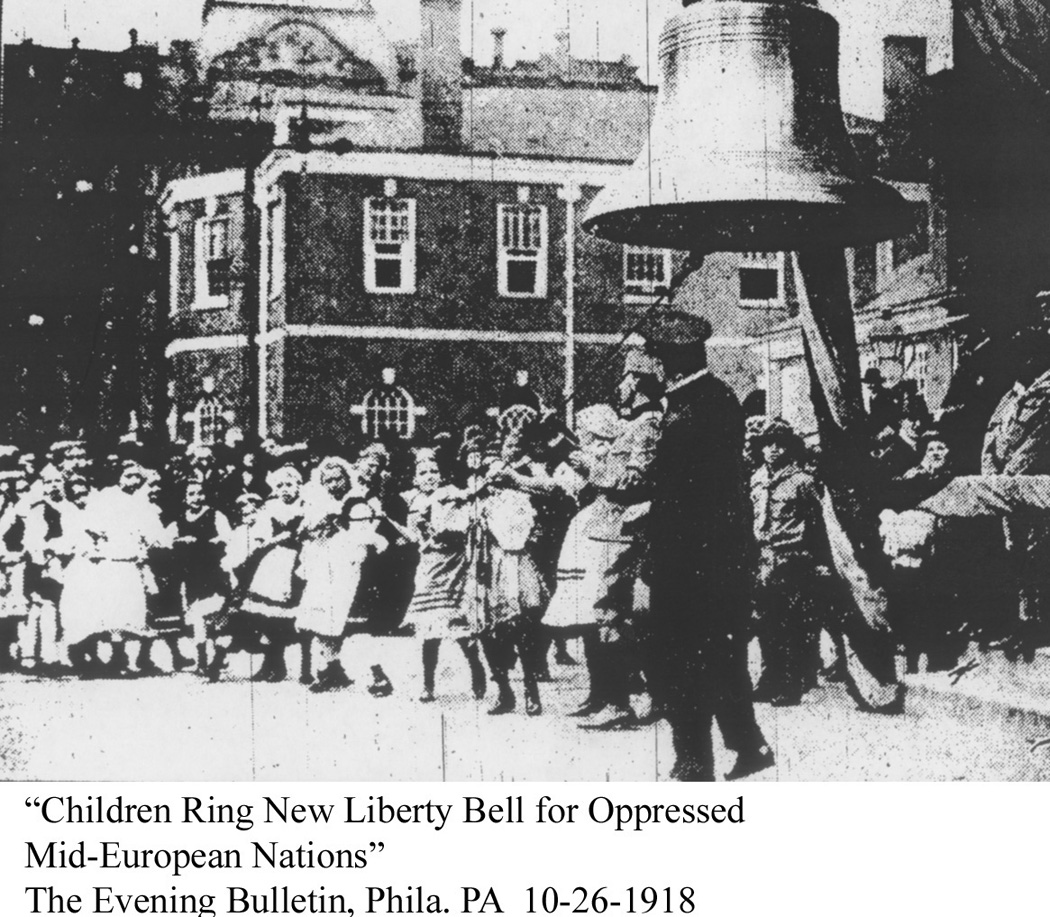
New Liberty Bell sm

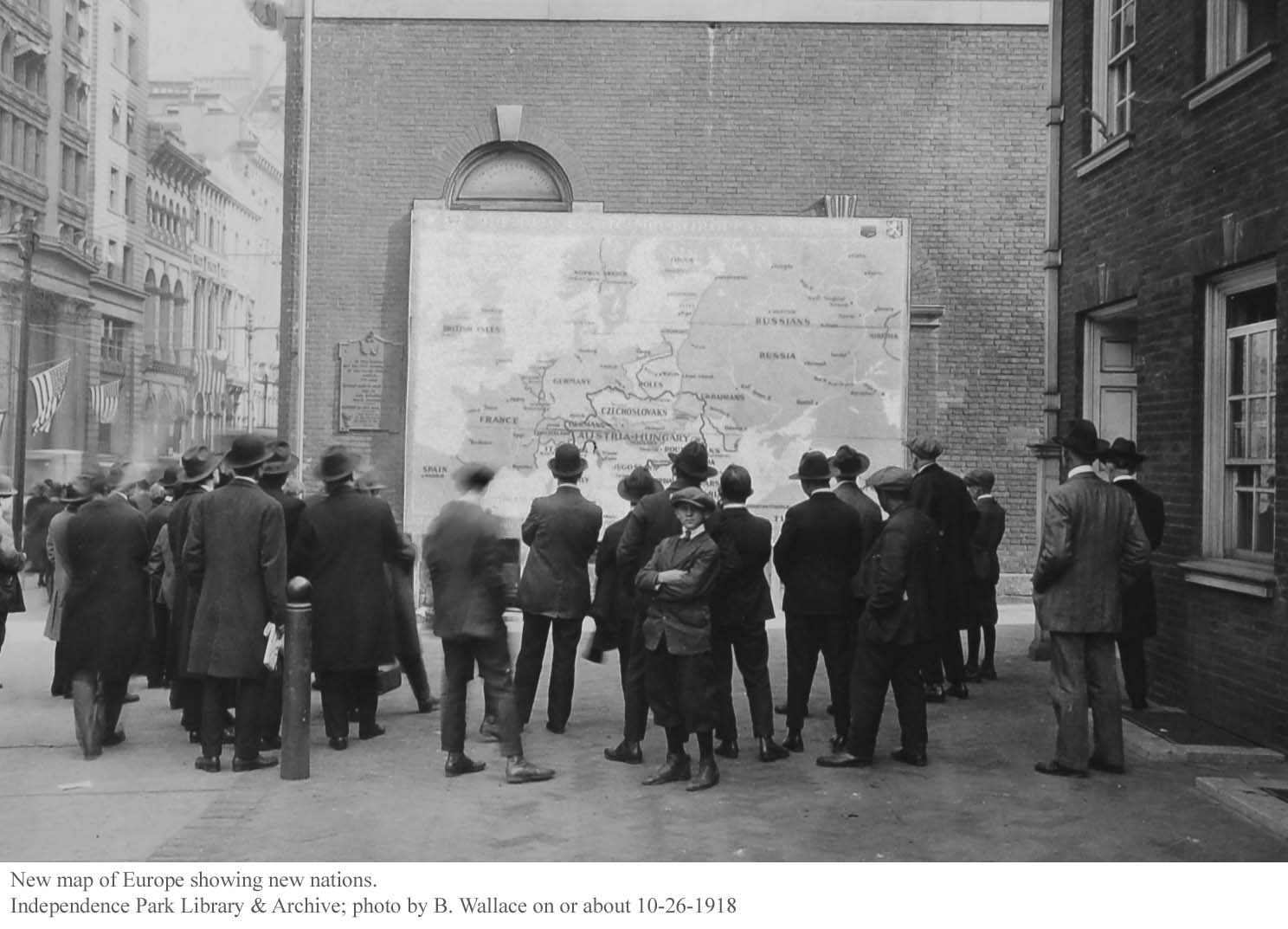
New Map of Europe 1918
