= Camp Mini-Yo-We =

Christian camping and outdoor center in Ontario, Canada

Coordinates: 45.24463°N 79.24173°W

- Named after: Bible verse John 4:14
- Formation: January 28, 1947
- Legal status: Non-profit organization
- Headquarters: Port Sydney, Ontario, Canada
- Leader: Steve McCready
- Key people: Steve McCready (Executive Director), Cynthia Heidman (Finance Director), Spencer Tamming (Operations Director).
- Website: www.campmyw.com
- Formerly called: The Fountain of Living Waters

Camp Mini-Yo-We is a Christian camping and outdoor center founded on January 28, 1947. It is located in the district of Muskoka in Central Ontario, Canada. The Camp provides outdoor programs for young people from 5 to 18 years old. Camp Mini-Yo-We focuses on leadership development and spiritual growth of young boys and girls. Rich Birch, a long time ministry leader, was the camp Executive director.

== History ==
Camp Mini-Yo-We has more than 80 years of history. Sunday school teachers and superintendents from various Brethren churches in Toronto wanted a place for children to escape from the city, experience nature, and receive religious teachings. The first camps were held in 1946 using rented facilities from the Fair Havens Bible Conference in Beaverton, Ontario.

Originally, the Camp was named The Fountain of Living Waters after the Bible verse John 4:14. Its success prompted the committee to seek land for a permanent summer camp. In 1946, the Brethren Assemblies purchased a property on Mary Lake in Muskoka. On January 28, 1947, the organization was officially incorporated and its name changed to Camp Mini-Yo-We.

In Camp Mini-Yo-We's early years, boys attended in July and girls in August. This gender separation camp would continue until 1992 when "parallel camping" was introduced. Over 10 years, there have been many construction initiatives at South Camp, including the first aid centre (1949), lodge (1951), staff house (1956), gatehouse (1958), and waterfront (1960). By 1960, the Camp was organizing programs for more than 750 children each summer.

The District of Muskoka in Huntsville, Ontario, awarded a prize to Camp Mini-Yo-We in recognition to its exceptional partnership and leadership in providing a camp experience to children.

== Programs ==
Camp Mini-Yo-We operates many programs at three camp sites organized around gender and age groups: Girls Camp (ages 10 to 15), Junior Camp (ages 5 to 9), Boys Camp (ages 10 to 15), Enterprise (ages 14 to 15), Leaders in Training (LIT, ages 15-17), and Day Camps (ages 5 to 12). A camp site includes a lodge and is made up different sections of cabins separated by age group. More specialized programs for older age groups aim to teach campers specific skills. For example, the LIT program aims to teach teenagers how to handle house chores, survival skills, and what a role model is. Campers engage in communal, sports and recreational activities, games, instructional periods, and Bible studies. Camp Mini-Yo-We can accommodate at most 400 campers per week and focuses on their physical, mental and spiritual development.

== See also ==
- Camping (recreational activity)
- Outdoor education
- Prayer camps
