= CKAR-FM =

Community radio station in Hunters Bay, Ontario

Coordinates: 45.32520°N 79.22373°W

- Huntsville, Ontario; Canada
- Frequency: 88.7 MHz
- Branding: The Bay Muskoka

Ownership
- Owner: Hunter's Bay Radio, Inc.

History
- First air date: 2014

Technical information
- Class: B
- ERP: 5.7 kilowatts horizontal polarization only
- HAAT: 182.1 metres (597 ft)

Links
- Website: muskokaradio.com

CKAR-FM, is a community radio station which is operating as Hunters Bay Radio (The Bay) at 88.7 MHz (FM) in Huntsville, Ontario, Canada. It is located in the District Municipality of Muskoka.

The Bay was originally created in 2010 as an online internet radio station, Hunters Bay Radio received approval by the CRTC on November 21, 2013, to operate a terrestrial radio station at 88.7 MHz, with an average effective radiated power of 5,700 watts (non directional antenna with an effective height of antenna above average terrain of 182.1 metres). The station would eventually be issued its call sign, CKAR-FM.

Hunters Bay Radio transitioned to FM on May 18, 2014. In 2017 On August 15, 2018, Hunters Bay Radio Inc. submitted an application to operate a new FM transmitter at Bracebridge. The new transmitter in Bracebridge would operate at 104.7 MHz with 18,000 watts. The CRTC denied Hunters Bay Radio Inc.'s application to operate a new FM transmitter at Bracebridge on February 5, 2019.

On August 8, 2019, Hunters Bay Radio 88.7 FM was knocked off the air as a result of an arson that took place at its transmitter facility in Dwight that damaged the stations' equipment. A short time later, the station was restored with reduced power. A new transmitter was replaced and turned on October 8 that same year. The radio station announced in January 2026 that it had reached a milestone of $800,000 in donations from the station to area charities and not for profit organizations through its weekly bingo initiative which was started in 2016. The station has supported healthcare and seniors and youth mental health organizations among others including local food banks through its Bay Food Crew partnership with other local businesses.

The CKAR call sign was used for a number of years at another station in Huntsville, known today as CFBK-FM; was also used at present-day CKDO in Oshawa, Ontario and a defunct television station in Armstrong, Ontario, known as CHFD-TV.
