= Denny Hall =

Building at the University of Washington

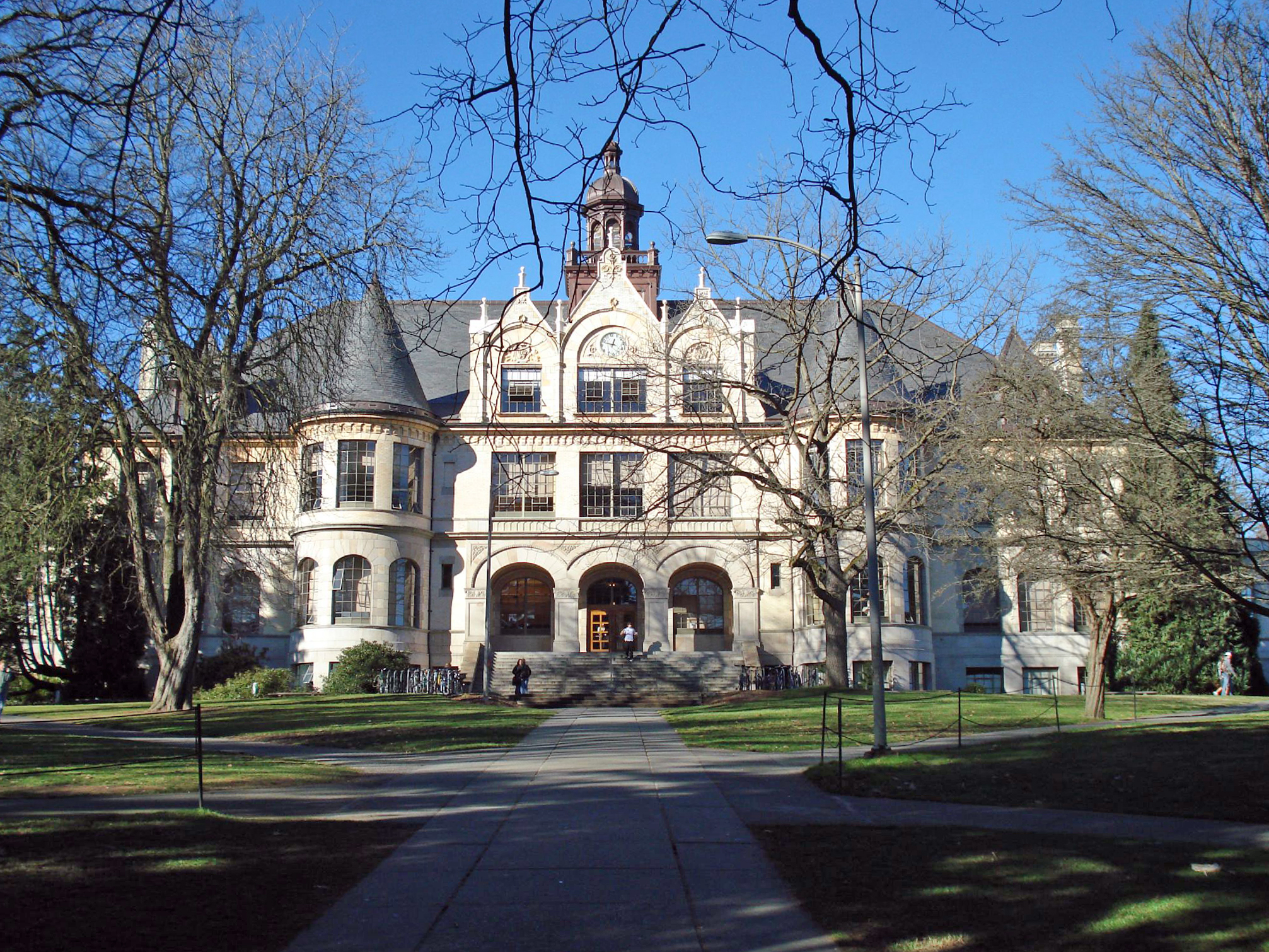
- Interactive map of the Denny Hall area
- Former names: Administration Building

General information
- Architectural style: French Renaissance Revival
- Coordinates: 47.6585°N 122.3086°W
- Named for: Arthur A. Denny
- Groundbreaking: 1894
- Opened: 1895
- Owner: University of Washington

Design and construction
- Architect: Charles Saunders

Website
- washington.edu/maps/den

Denny Hall is a building on the main campus of the University of Washington, in Seattle, Washington, United States. Built between 1894 and 1895, it is named after Arthur A. Denny.

== Design ==
Denny Hall was designed by Charles Saunders and constructed between 1894 and 1895. The brick and sandstone, French Renaissance Revival building is the oldest on the University of Washington's current campus. (Note: The University of Washington was founded in 1861 at a different location. It moved from its original Downtown Seattle site in the Metropolitan Tract to its current campus in the 1890s.) Denny Yard, a landscaped lawn with mature canopy trees, is in front of the building.

== History ==
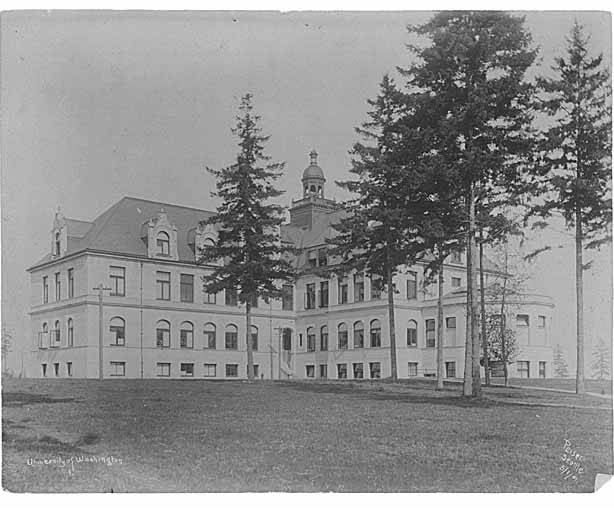
Photograph of the Administration Building in 1901

The cornerstone was laid in a July 1894 at a ceremony attended by about 1,000. Originally called the Administration Building, in 1910 it was renamed after Arthur A. Denny, one of the founders of Seattle and an early benefactor of the university. The building was renovated, first in 1957, and a second time beginning in 2008. The $56 million renovation of 2008 was stalled by the Great Recession but resumed in 2014 and was completed two years later.

An engraving of Denny Hall is featured on the University of Washington's mace, which is carried and displayed by the Marshal of the University during Convocation and Commencement ceremonies.

Installed in the cupola of Denny Hall is a 400-pound (180 kg), 1859 bell ("the Varsity Bell") which is rung once per year, on Homecoming, to ceremonially summon the university's alumni to campus. From 1961 until his death in 2013, Brewster Denny was responsible for the annual ringing of the Varsity Bell.

As of 2016, the building houses the university's departments of Anthropology, Classics, Germanics and Near Eastern Languages & Civilization, It is located on the University of Washington's Seattle campus.
