= Huntsville, Ontario =

Town in Muskoka, Canada

Huntsville
- Town (lower-tier)
- Town of Huntsville
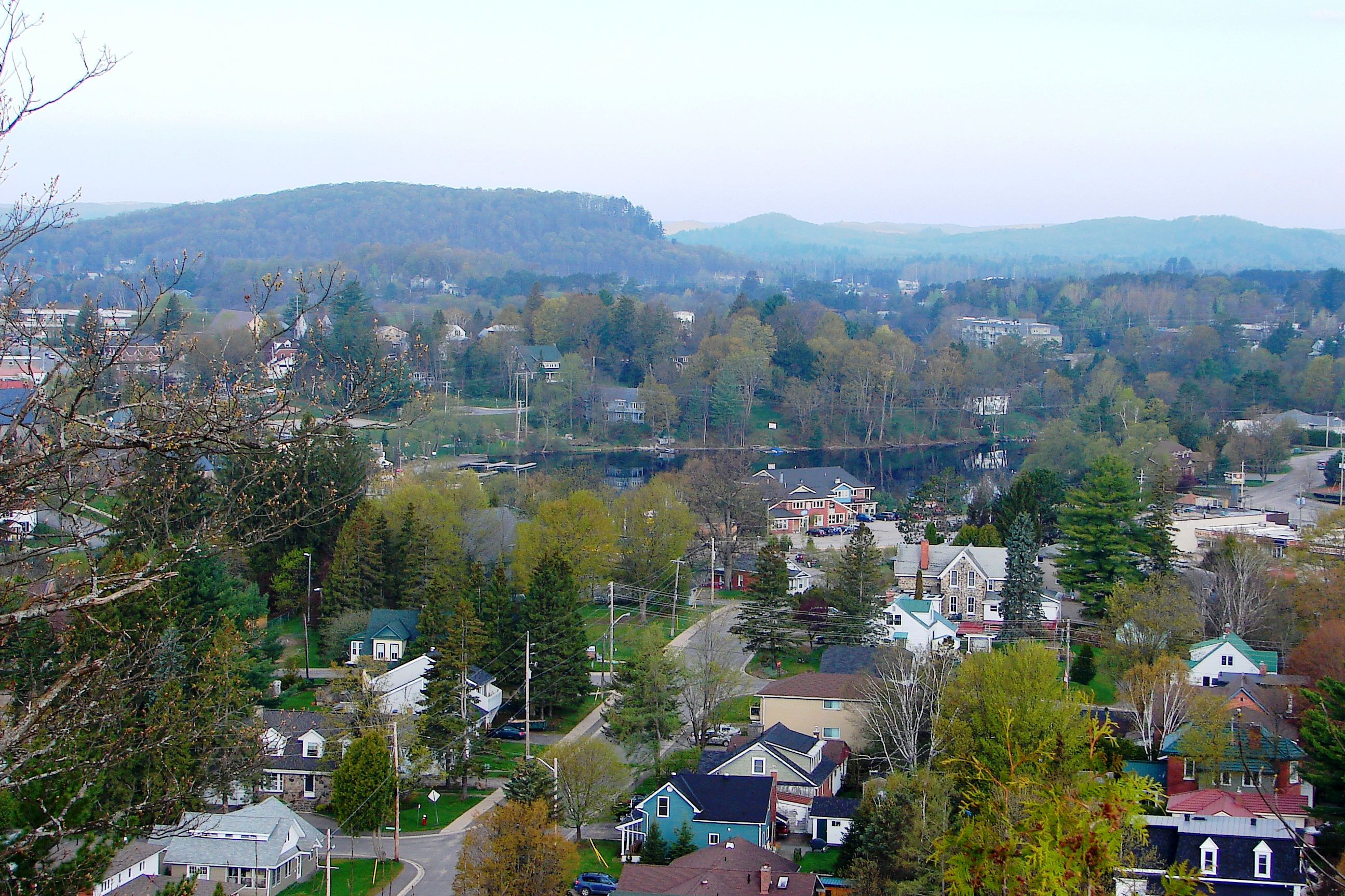
- Motto: Touch the Past, Embrace the Future
- Location within Southern Ontario
- Coordinates: 45°20′N 79°13′W
- Country: Canada
- Province: Ontario
- District: Muskoka
- Settled: 1869
- Incorporated: 1886

Government
  - Type: Town
  - Mayor: Nancy Alcock
  - Fed. riding: Parry Sound-Muskoka
  - Prov. riding: Parry Sound—Muskoka

Area
  - Land: 705.18 km^{2} (272.27 sq mi)
  - Urban: 8.73 km^{2} (3.37 sq mi)

Population (2021)
  - Total: 21,147
  - Density: 30/km^{2} (78/sq mi)
  - Urban: 6,639
  - Urban density: 760.6/km^{2} (1,970/sq mi)
- Time zone: UTC−5 (EST)
  - Summer (DST): UTC−4 (EDT)
- Postal code FSA: P1H
- Area codes: 705, 249, 683
- Highways: Highway 11; Highway 60
- Website: www.huntsville.ca

Huntsville is a town in the District Municipality of Muskoka, Ontario, Canada. It is located 215 kilometres (134 mi) north of Toronto and 130 kilometres (81 mi) south of North Bay. Of the three major Muskoka towns (the others being Gravenhurst and Bracebridge), Huntsville has the largest population (21,147 per 2021 census) and land area (710.64 square kilometres (274.38 sq mi)).

Huntsville is located in the hilly terrain of the Canadian Shield and is dotted with many lakes. Due to its natural environment and natural resources, Huntsville is a tourist destination that draws many people from around the world. The Toronto Star ranked the town the #1 place to take a summer trip in 2011.

Huntsville serves as the western gateway to Algonquin Provincial Park via Ontario Highway 60 and was the host to the 36th G8 summit in June 2010, at Deerhurst Resort.

== History ==
The first European who settled in the area in 1869 was George Hunt, who built a small agricultural centre. In 1870, a post office was built and the area was named Huntsville after Hunt, who became the first postmaster. Huntsville's economic development was stimulated by the engineering of a navigable water route north from Port Sydney to Huntsville, which opened in 1877. A railway route from Gravenhurst was built by the Northern and Pacific Junction Railway in 1885, which encouraged development and resulted in Huntsville becoming officially incorporated in 1886.

In the following year, the Muskoka Colonization Road reached this area. The central Ontario community became an important industrial area in the late 19th century and had several saw, planing, and shingle mills, as well as a tannery. Today, the many lakes and hills in the area, combined with the town's proximity to both Algonquin Park and Toronto, make Huntsville and the Muskoka region a major tourist destination.

In 1965, the town annexed part of Chaffey Township. On January 1, 1971, the Town of Huntsville was greatly enlarged during the district's restructuring when it amalgamated with the townships of Brunei, Chaffey, Stephenson, and Stisted, as well as the Village of Port Sydney.

In June 2010, Deerhurst Resort in Huntsville was host to the 36th G8 summit.

=== Empire Hotel ===
On 8 October 2009, Huntsville lost one of its valued landmarks, the Empire Hotel. The first building erected at the site of the Empire Hotel was Jacob's Hotel, built around 1875 by James W. Jacobs. He later renamed it Dominion Hotel. Jacobs died in 1890 and left behind his wife and eldest daughter, both of whom were named Emma. It is unknown which woman married a McLaughlin man, but the McLaughlin family renovated the building after the horrible Main Street fire of 1894.

The 26 July 1906 issue of the Huntsville Forester reported the sale of the hotel to Robert T. McNairney and D. Kehoe, who demolished it to expand it three stories. By 1922, the Dominion was owned by Bruce Simmons. Organized in 1933, the town's rotary club began to meet at the hotel and would for many years. In 1945, the hotel was bought Louis Mascioli of Timmins. From 1947 to 1948, the Mascioli brothers renovated and expanded the facility, removing the porches, adding street level retail units, and erecting the adjoining four-story red brick building. They also renamed it the Empire Hotel. The first shops were a barbershop, a jewelry store, and a shoe store. Beilhartz shoes remained in business in the Empire Block until 1985.

In the mid-1980s, Jim Tumber, who acquired the building along with Gary Macklaim, obtained a grant from the Government of Ontario to help convert the now-derelict building from a hotel into an apartment building.

Dave Keay, the building's last owner, bought the Empire in 1999. Over the next 10 years, he refurbished the basement bar and the 52 apartments and did most of the work personally. The fire happened on the day that Keay had just finished the outside painting.

The fire was believed to be caused by an electrical problem, but the exact cause is still unclear. As of March 2026, the lot is empty.

== Geography ==
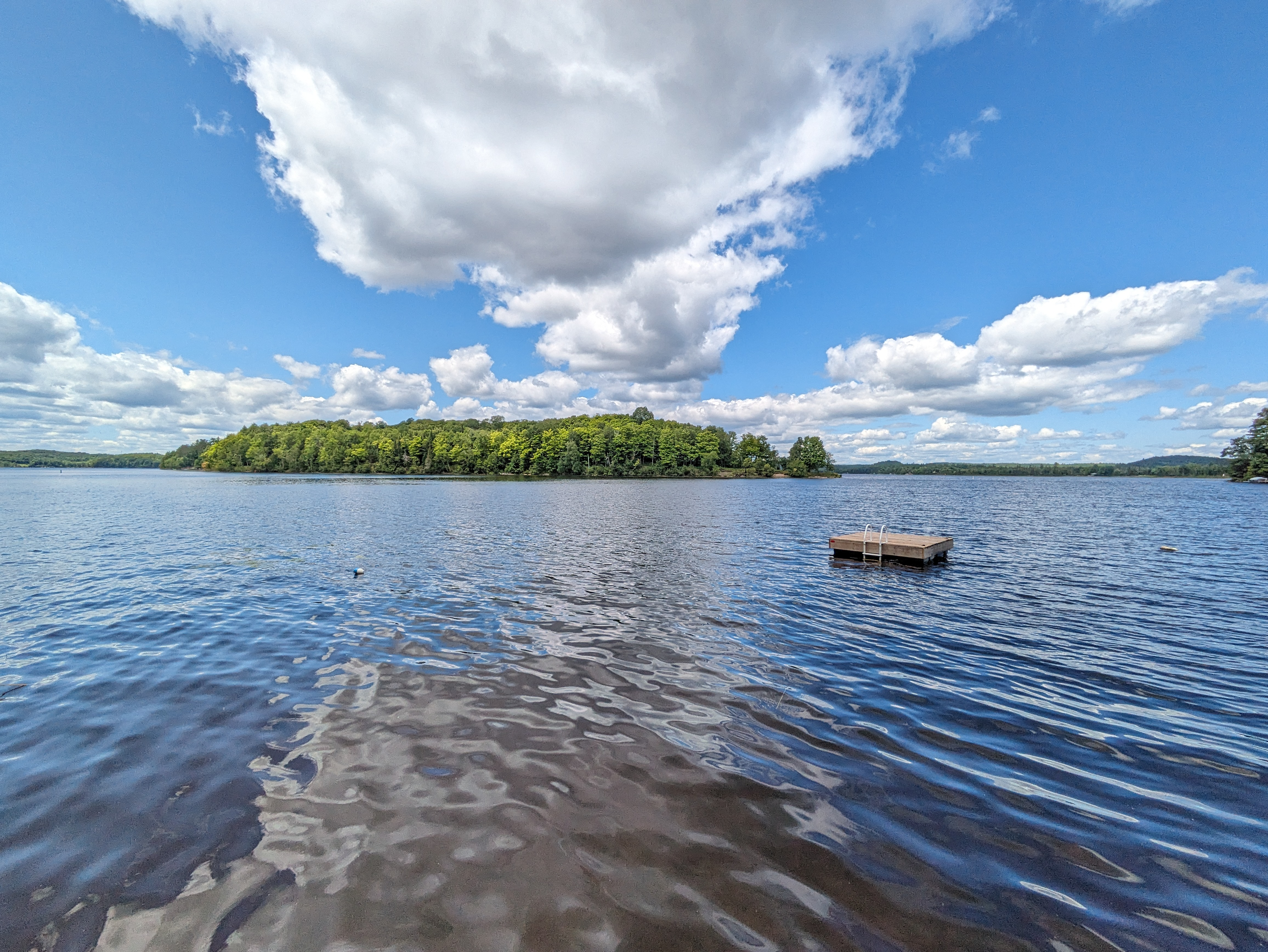
Lake Vernon, with Gallaugher island in the centre

There are three large lakes within the township boundary: Mary Lake, Lake Vernon, and Fairy Lake, as well as countless smaller lakes. Peninsula Lake, Skeleton Lake, and Lake of Bays lie directly outside the town. The Muskoka River winds its way through the city's downtown, and the Big East River empties into Lake Vernon. The Arrowhead Provincial Park is also located within city limits.

The Canadian Shield causes many scenic hills and sweeping landscapes throughout the region. The city centre is made up of hills and steep roadways. While there are some flat, low-lying areas, much of the city lies on uneven terrain.

=== Climate ===
Huntsville experiences a humid continental climate (Köppen Dfb), with warm, humid summers, and cold winters. The town has four distinct seasons. Particularly during the colder weather season, there is considerable variance in day-to-day temperatures. Huntsville is located in the snowbelt region of Central Ontario, near the Great Lakes, causing snowy winters and lake-effect snow. The town has comfortable summer temperatures and occasional heatwaves accompanied by high humidity and active thunderstorm weather. Huntsville and the Muskoka region have the highest annual precipitation of any region in Ontario.

Climate data for Huntsville (1981–2010)
Month	Jan	Feb	Mar	Apr	May	Jun	Jul	Aug	Sep	Oct	Nov	Dec	Year
Record high °C (°F)	12.5 (54.5)	13.0 (55.4)	21.7 (71.1)	30.0 (86.0)	31.1 (88.0)	34.0 (93.2)	34.5 (94.1)	34.0 (93.2)	35.0 (95.0)	26.7 (80.1)	22.8 (73.0)	17.0 (62.6)	35.0 (95.0)
Mean daily maximum °C (°F)	−4.7 (23.5)	−2.3 (27.9)	2.7 (36.9)	10.6 (51.1)	17.9 (64.2)	22.8 (73.0)	25.2 (77.4)	23.9 (75.0)	18.9 (66.0)	12.0 (53.6)	4.5 (40.1)	−1.6 (29.1)	10.8 (51.4)
Daily mean °C (°F)	−10.3 (13.5)	−8.1 (17.4)	−3.2 (26.2)	4.8 (40.6)	11.8 (53.2)	16.9 (62.4)	19.5 (67.1)	18.5 (65.3)	13.8 (56.8)	7.5 (45.5)	0.8 (33.4)	−5.7 (21.7)	5.5 (41.9)
Mean daily minimum °C (°F)	−15.6 (3.9)	−13.9 (7.0)	−9.1 (15.6)	−1.0 (30.2)	5.7 (42.3)	11.1 (52.0)	13.8 (56.8)	13.1 (55.6)	8.7 (47.7)	3.0 (37.4)	−2.9 (26.8)	−9.9 (14.2)	0.3 (32.5)
Record low °C (°F)	−39.5 (−39.1)	−38.3 (−36.9)	−35.0 (−31.0)	−18.3 (−0.9)	−7.8 (18.0)	−1.0 (30.2)	4.4 (39.9)	−10.0 (14.0)	−4.0 (24.8)	−8.9 (16.0)	−22.0 (−7.6)	−36.5 (−33.7)	−39.5 (−39.1)
Average precipitation mm (inches)	92.8 (3.65)	71.9 (2.83)	67.7 (2.67)	61.0 (2.40)	88.7 (3.49)	78.2 (3.08)	82.7 (3.26)	81.2 (3.20)	111.5 (4.39)	105.0 (4.13)	99.4 (3.91)	93.9 (3.70)	1,034 (40.71)
Average rainfall mm (inches)	18.2 (0.72)	15.9 (0.63)	31.6 (1.24)	51.5 (2.03)	88.3 (3.48)	78.2 (3.08)	82.7 (3.26)	81.2 (3.20)	111.5 (4.39)	100.9 (3.97)	69.8 (2.75)	21.6 (0.85)	751.3 (29.58)
Average snowfall cm (inches)	74.6 (29.4)	56.0 (22.0)	36.1 (14.2)	9.5 (3.7)	0.4 (0.2)	0 (0)	0 (0)	0 (0)	0 (0)	4.1 (1.6)	29.6 (11.7)	72.3 (28.5)	282.7 (111.3)
Average precipitation days (≥ 0.2 mm)	15.5	11.4	10.2	11.3	13.1	11.7	10.9	12.6	13.4	14.7	14.2	14.7	153.7
Average rainy days (≥ 0.2 mm)	2.5	1.8	4.4	9.6	13.1	11.7	10.9	12.6	13.4	14.0	9.2	3.6	106.8
Average snowy days (≥ 0.2 cm)	13.9	10.0	6.8	2.6	0.2	0	0	0	0	1.1	6.2	12.5	53.3
Source: Environment Canada

=== Communities ===
In addition to the city centre, the following communities are also located within the municipal boundaries:

- Allensville
- Ashworth
- Aspdin
- Britannia Road
- Canal
- Centurion
- Etwell
- Grassmere
- Hidden Valley
- Hoodstown
- Ilfracombe
- Lancelot
- Martins
- Melissa
- Muskoka Lodge
- Newholm
- Norvern Shores
- Parkersville
- Port Sydney
- Ravenscliffe
- Stanleydale
- Utterson
- Vernon Shores
- Williamsport
- Yearley

The ghost town of Emberson was a rural postal village from 1874 to 1924 serving near by bush farms and logging camps. Today, the area is covered over and reached by foot from the northern terminus of Brunel Sideroad 1.

== Demographics ==
In the 2021 Census of Population conducted by Statistics Canada, Huntsville had a population of 21,147 living in 8,817 of its 11,214 total private dwellings. This is a change of 6.7% from its 2016 population of 19,816. With a land area of 705.18 km^{2} (272.27 sq mi), it had a population density of 30.0/km^{2} (77.7/sq mi) in 2021.

Historical census populations – Huntsville, Ontario

Year	Pop.	±%
1891	1,159	—
1901	2,152	+85.7%
1911	2,358	+9.6%
1921	2,246	−4.7%
1931	2,817	+25.4%
1941	2,800	−0.6%
1951	3,286	+17.4%

Year	Pop.	±%
1955	3,051	−7.2%
1961	3,189	+4.5%
1966	3,342	+4.8%
1971	9,784	+192.8%
1976	11,123	+13.7%
1981	11,467	+3.1%
1986	12,131	+5.8%

Year	Pop.	±%
1991	14,997	+23.6%
1996	15,918	+6.1%
2001	17,338	+8.9%
2006	18,280	+5.4%
2011	19,056	+4.2%
2016	19,816	+4.0%
2021	21,147	+6.7%

Population counts are not adjusted for boundary changes.
Source: Statistics Canada

== Economy ==
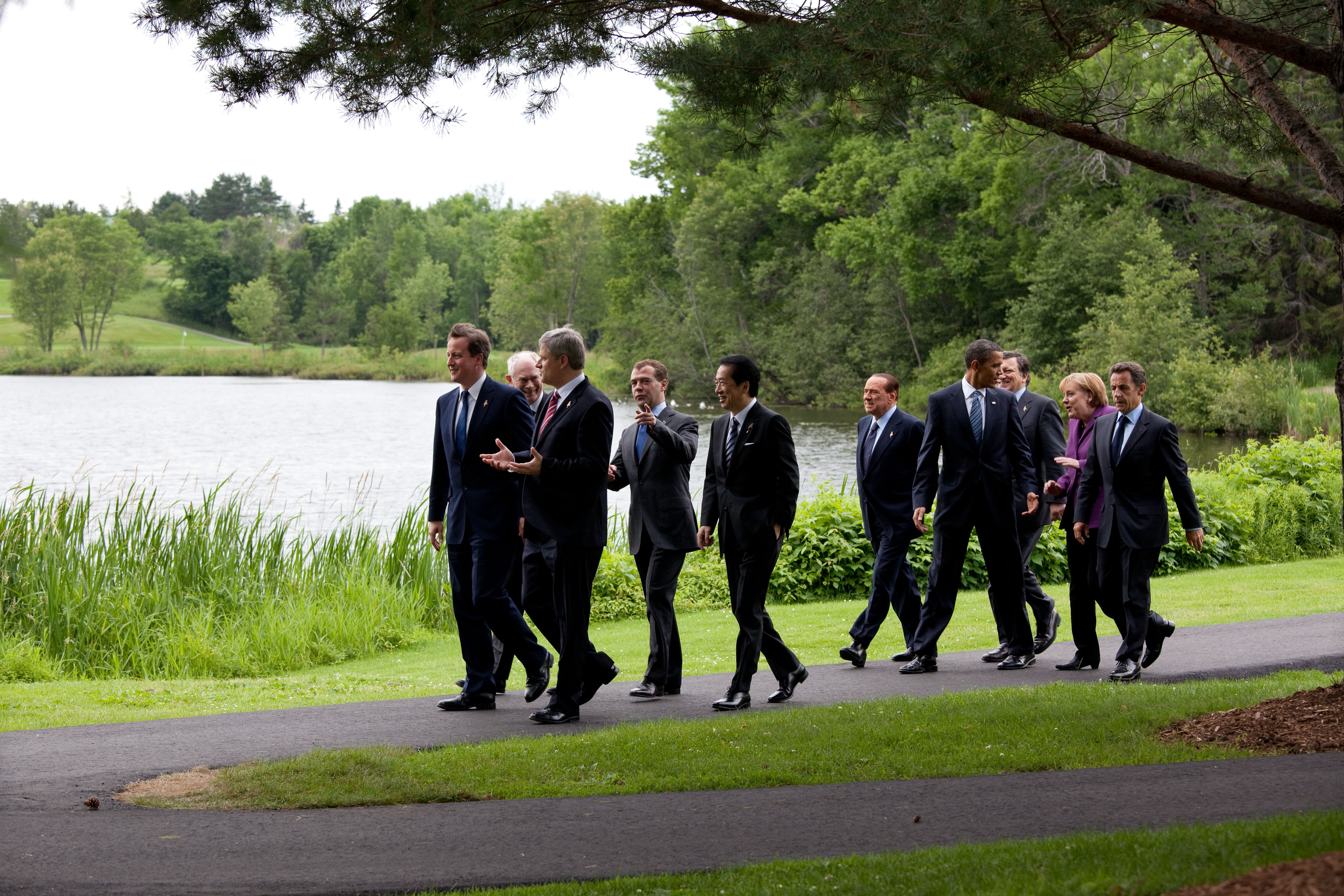
World Leaders at the 36th G8 summit

Major employers in Huntsville include Deerhurst Resort, Trillium Lakelands District School Board, and Kimberly Clark.

Due to the influx of tourists during the summer months and the abundance of seasonal residents, Huntsville's economy is primarily service based. There are also many people employed in construction trades. Although there is progress being made, Huntsville's unemployment rate has long been above the provincial average. This is largely due to the seasonal nature of its tourism industry.

Main Street is home to various business and services for Huntsville. Huntsville Place Mall, on Main Street East, features many retailers. The mall also has ten Tesla superchargers.

== Government ==
The town's council is made up of nine members. The members include the mayor, three town and district councillors who represent the town at the municipality of Muskoka council, and ward councillors who represent the wards of Huntsville (Ward 1), Chaffey (Ward 2), Stephenson-Stisted-Port Sydney (Wards 3, 4, 5), and Brunel (Ward 6).

A regular council meeting is held once a month in the Council Chambers in the Huntsville Civic Centre. From December 2019 to November 2022, the mayor of Huntsville was Karin Terziano. She had served as the acting mayor between 12 November 2019 and 17 December 2019. On 17 December 2019, Terziano was appointed to fill the vacancy of the mayor's office because of Scott Aitchison's resignation to become a federal MP for Parry Sound-Muskoka.

On 11 February 2019, Bob Stone was appointed to fill the vacant Ward One seat vacated when Mayor Terziano was appointed mayor.

On 24 February 2019, the council appointed Councillor Nancy Alcock to serve as Deputy Mayor. Alcock had previously served as the alternate deputy mayor. Councillor Jason FitzGerald was appointed alternate deputy mayor.

Members of the 2018–2022 council term were:

- Deputy Mayor Nancy Alcock (Town and District Councillor)
- Brian Thompson (Town and District Councillor)
- Tim Withey (Town and District Councillor)
- Bob Stone (Huntsville Ward Councillor, Ward 1)
- Jonathan Wiebe (Chaffey Ward Councillor, Ward 2)
- Dione Schumacher (Stephenson-Stisted-Port Sydney, Ward 3, 4, 5)
- Jason FitzGerald (Stephenson-Stisted-Port Sydney, Ward 3, 4, 5)
- Dan Armour (Brunel Ward Councillor, Ward 6)
- Mayor Terziano

In early 2022, Mayor Terziano announced her intention to retire at the end of the term. Four individuals announced their bids to become mayor. Former Fire Chief Steve Hernen, incumbent Town and District Councillor Tim Withey, taxi stand owner Ruben Bullion and incumbent Deputy Mayor Nancy Alcock ran for the office. Deputy Mayor Alcock won the election. Hernen, Withey, and Bullion placed second, third, and fourth respectively. Nancy Alcock was sworn in as the second female mayor of Huntsville and the first elected female on 21 November 2022.

- Mayor Nancy Alcock
- Deputy Mayor and Town and District Councillor Dan Armour
- Town and District Councillor Scott Morrison
- Town and District Councillor Bob Stone
- Helena Renwick (Huntsville Ward Councillor, Ward 1)
- Cory Clarke (Chaffey Ward Councillor, Ward 2)
- Dione Schumacher (Stephenson-Stisted-Port Sydney, Ward 3, 4, 5)
- Jason FitzGerald (Stephenson-Stisted-Port Sydney, Ward 3, 4, 5)
- Monty Clouthier (Brunel Ward Councillor, Ward 6)

=== Huntsville Town Hall ===
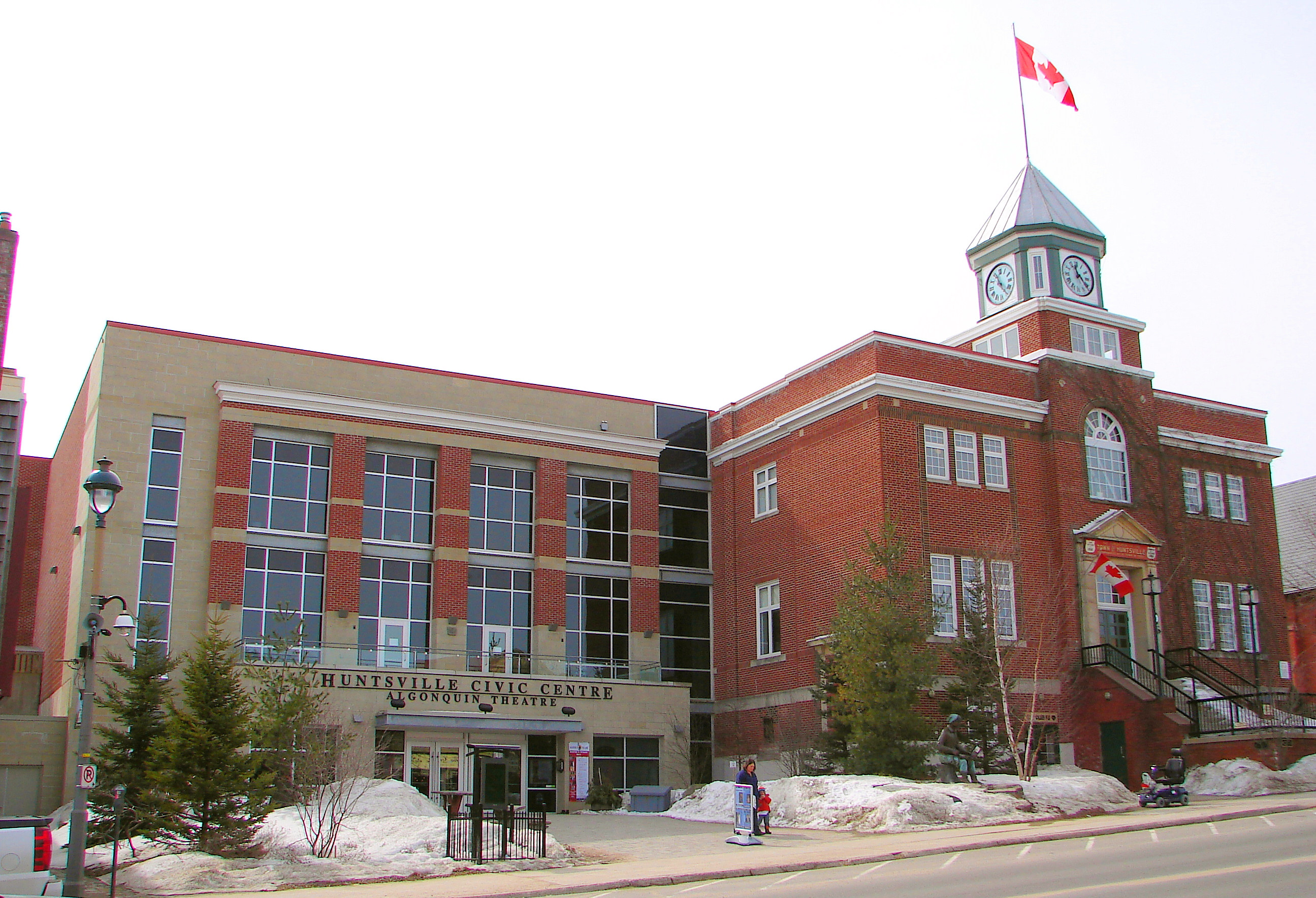
Huntsville Town Hall and Civic Centre

Built in 1926, the Classical Revival administration building was designed by Toronto-based Ellis and Belfry (James Ellis and Franklin Belfry) and was last renovated in 2006 with an added annex (Algonquin Theatre). Council is exploring options to deal with the aging structure. The clock faces were salvaged on 17 August 1927 from the demolition of the 1873 Union Station in Toronto. The building's land was once used as an early burial ground and Methodist manse for what was the Huntsville Methodist Church next door (c. 1897 and became Huntsville Trinity United Church in 1926). During the construction of the town hall in the 1920s, skeletal remains were unearthed, which showed that not everything had been moved to the new Locks Cemetery site. The building involved two decades of planning.

== Culture ==
Huntsville is a home to many acclaimed visual artists. Famed Canadian artists such as Tom Thomson and his successors, the Group of Seven, painted frequently in Huntsville. The Group of Seven Outdoor Gallery has over 40 outdoor murals celebrating the work of these Canadian heroes. Local community visual arts group, The Huntsville Art Society, hosts many annual shows, exhibits, and skills-sharing workshops throughout the year.

Many summer camps for children such as Ontario Pioneer Camp, Camp Wabanaki, Camp Mini-Yo-We, Muskoka Woods, Camp Nagiwa, Camp Tawingo, and Olympia Sports Camp are within a few kilometers of Huntsville. Resorts such as Deerhurst Resort, where Shania Twain was discovered in 1988–1989, Hidden Valley Resort and Cedar Grove Lodge are located within the town's boundaries.

Huntsville supports a number of arts festivals. The Huntsville Festival of the Arts provided a seed grant which funded a book of poetry entitled Fringe Festival Poetry, Poems from the Poetry Cafe, edited by June Salmon and Marta Mirecki-de Roode. Other local arts activities include the annual Muskoka Novel Marathon, started by Canadian authors Martin Avery and Mel Malton in 2001, the Film North – Huntsville International Film Festival which had its inaugural year in 2010, and most recently Nuit Blanche North, produced by the Huntsville Festival of the Arts and Edge of the Woods Theatre.

There are also many new arts organizations and associations. The Huntsville Art Society is a not-for-profit membership of local visual artists who opened an art gallery called The Art Space. Edge of the Woods Theatre presents artistic works by the community in Huntsville. They hold an annual traveling outdoor theatre event, as well as facilitate many different arts education projects for local seniors and youth within the community.

The Algonquin Theatre is a performing arts theatre, located within Huntsville's municipal centre. The theatre provides space for local dance, music, and school activities. For profit venues are also scheduled, and most of the labour is provided by local volunteers.

Keith Bellows, editor in chief of National Geographic Traveler and vice-president of the National Geographic Society, has included Huntsville and the Muskoka region in his book 100 Places That Can Change Your Child's Life.

== Sports ==
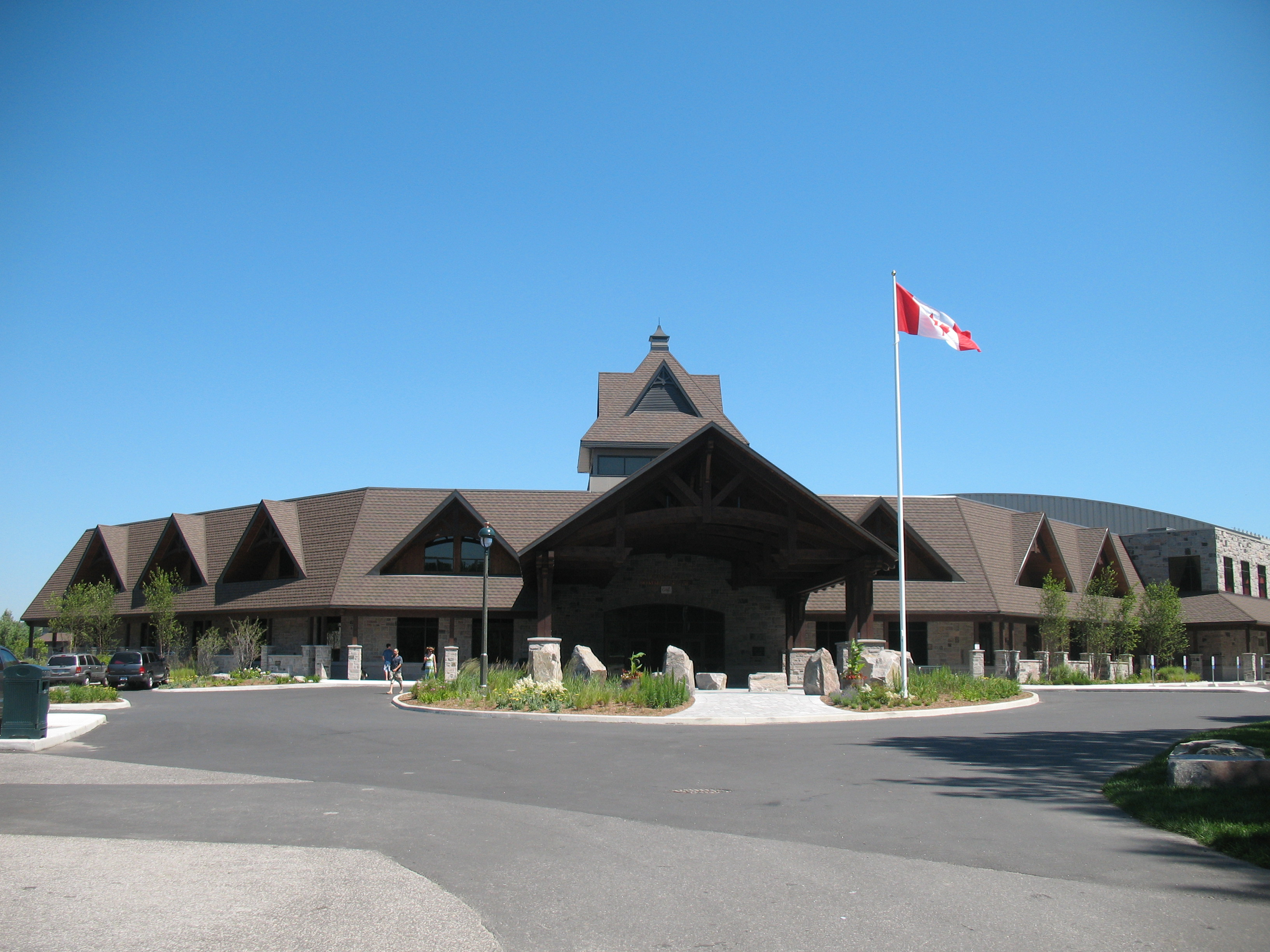
Canada Summit Centre

Hockey and lacrosse are popular sports in Huntsville. Within the Canada Summit Centre, there are two skating arenas. The Don Lough Arena is named after the beloved Huntsville citizen who was a key advocate for opening the rink. In the off season, the floor of the arena is used for lacrosse. The Summit Centre's second arena, the Jack Bionda, is named after a local sports icon.

Huntsville is home to one of the largest running Girls Hockey Associations. This association has been in existence since 1971/72, and is home to Huntsville Honeys Senior C Team, and the Huntsville Sting Bantam BB team.

The town has a lacrosse team, the Huntsville Hawks of the OLA Junior C Lacrosse League as well as a full complement of Minor Lacrosse, from Paperweight to Midget age players.

The town also had an Ontario Provincial Junior A Hockey League team called the Huntsville Otters, which has had players move on to major junior A in the Ontario Hockey League. There has been a new Junior C Hockey team reintroduced to the town as of 2012 season.

Huntsville is one of three Canadian towns hosting Ironman 70.3 triathlons.

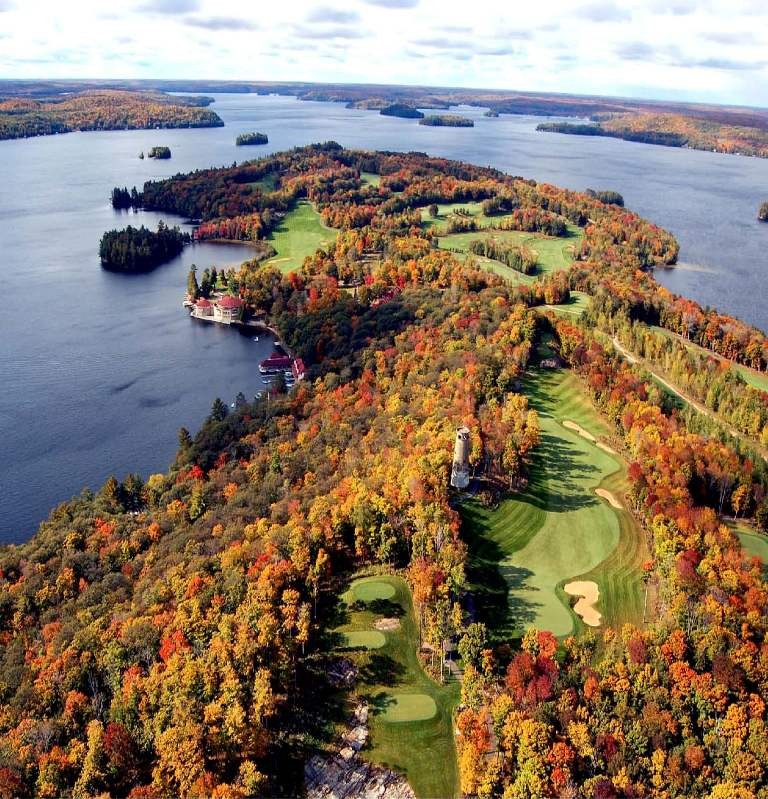
Bigwin in the fall

Huntsville also has a large soccer community, run by the Huntsville Soccer Club with over 1,000 participants in total. Over 800 kids between the ages of 2 and 19 play. The club also has many adult players.

Golf courses in Huntsville area include Deerhurst Highlands, the Mark O'Meara Course at Grandview Golf Club, and Bigwin Island Golf Club.

== Transportation ==
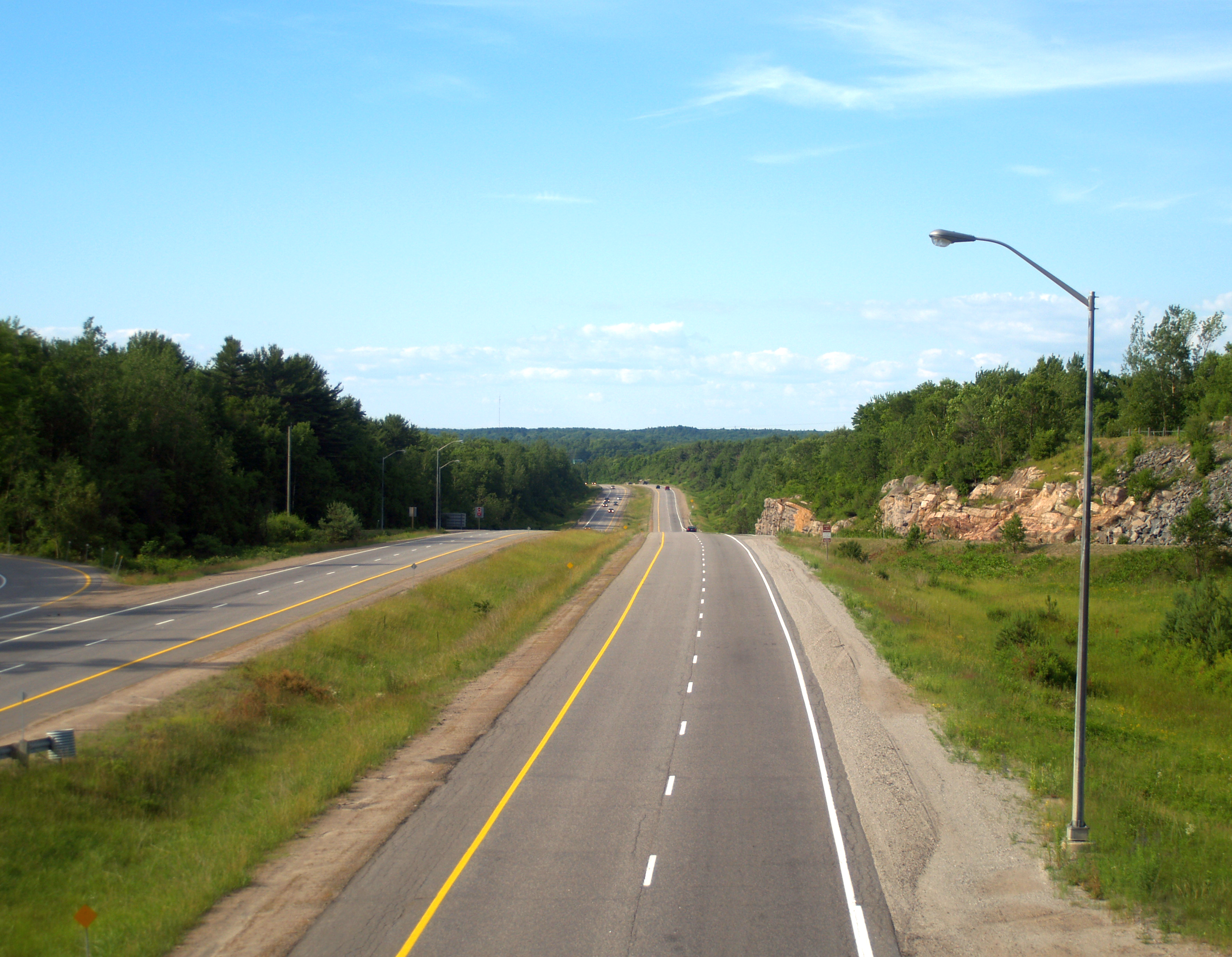
HWY 11 North towards Huntsville

Huntsville is accessible through a variety of roadways, including Highway 60, Highway 11, and Muskoka (Regional) Road 3. Buses to and from Toronto come into the city daily.

Main Street is the key in town road that connects with Highway 11 to the west and Highway 60 to the north.

Passenger train service to the city from Toronto was provided daily by the Northlander at the Huntsville railway station, until Northlander discontinued train services in September 2012. Today, the tracks are used by CN Rail and Ontario Northland for freight service. The station is now home to a music school.

Huntsville Transit provides local bus service in the town on a single east–west route. Service is provided Monday to Saturday.

== Education ==
Public education for students from kindergarten through high school is administered through the Trillium Lakelands District School Board. It oversees the town's single high school, Huntsville High School, and six elementary schools. A Primary Catholic school (Saint Mary Catholic Elementary School) is administered by the Simcoe Muskoka Catholic District School Board. There are several private schools that serve students through elementary and high school ages.

The Waterloo Summit Centre for the Environment, established with funding provided by the 2010 G8 Summit Legacy Fund as a partnership between the Town of Huntsville and the University of Waterloo. This facility was utilized by researchers and students of the University of Waterloo and the Northern Ontario School of Medicine. In 2017, the University of Waterloo terminated its lease with the Town of Huntsville, due to the distance between the centre and the university. The centre is permanently closed.

The Huntsville District Memorial Hospital is a community teaching hospital affiliated with the Northern Ontario School of Medicine (Lakehead University and Laurentian University).

== Media ==
=== Radio ===
Frequency	Call sign	Branding	Format	Owner	Notes
FM 88.7	CKAR-FM	Hunters Bay Radio	Community radio	Hunters Bay Radio Inc.	
FM 94.3	CBLU-FM	CBC Radio One	Talk radio, public radio	Canadian Broadcasting Corporation	Rebroadcaster of CBLA-FM (Toronto)
FM 98.9	CJLF-FM-3	Life FM	Contemporary Christian music	Trust Communications Ministries, Inc.	Rebroadcaster of CJLF-FM (Barrie)
FM 105.5	CFBK-FM	Moose FM	Pop music	Vista Broadcast Group	
FM 106.9	CBL-FM-1	CBC Radio 2	Adult contemporary, public radio	Canadian Broadcasting Corporation	Rebroadcaster of CBL-FM (Toronto)

=== Television ===
OTA channel	Call sign	Network	Notes
11 (VHF)	CKNY-TV-11	CTV	Rebroadcaster of CICI-TV (Sudbury)

Huntsville is served by a TVCogeco community channel for Cogeco cable subscribers.

The town was previously served by repeaters for CBC Television and TVO: CBLT-TV-2 and CICO-TV-13, respectively. Both repeaters were shut down following the 2012 closing of all CBC analogue transmitters, several of which were also used by TVO.

=== Newspaper ===
- Huntsville Forester (published by Metroland Media Group)

== Notable residents ==
- Jack Bionda, professional hockey and lacrosse athlete was born in Huntsville. Bionda was best known as a lacrosse player. He later owned a local restaurant.
- James Carroll, actor (Wind at My Back) and community radio personality (Hunters Bay Radio), resided here in his later years.
- Dara Howell, freestyle skier, 2014 Winter Olympics gold medalist in ski slopestyle.
- Sidney D. Kirkpatrick, award-winning American documentary filmmaker and a bestselling historical author.
- Ethan Moreau, a former NHL hockey player and current scout for the Montreal Canadiens.
- Kyle Nelson, mixed martial artist who competes in the UFC Featherweight division.
- Jason Reso, Wrestler. Former World Heavyweight and WWE Tag Team Champion. Resided in Huntsville during his early years.
- George Selkirk (1908–1987), major league baseball player born in Huntsville. Selkirk succeeded the legendary Babe Ruth as the right fielder for the New York Yankees.
- Normand Shay, a former NHL hockey player.
- Les Stroud, survival expert and host of the television program Survivorman. Toronto born and now based in Huntsville.
- Hawksley Workman, musician and songwriter. Former student at Huntsville High School.

== In film ==
- Most of the 1995 film It Takes Two, starring Kirstie Alley, Steve Guttenberg and Mary-Kate and Ashley Olsen, was filmed at Camp Mini-Yo-We, which is located within the city's boundaries.
- The opening sequence of the Walt Disney film The Incredible Journey showcases the village of Aspdin from the air. In this scene, Muskoka's oldest stone church, St. Mary's Anglican, can clearly be seen. Lake Vernon also appears.
- A part of the 1989 film Welcome Home, starring Kris Kristofferson, was shot at Lion's Lookout.
- Much of the 2018 Hallmark Film, A Veteran's Christmas, starring Eloise Mumford and Sean Faris was filmed in downtown Huntsville in the fall of 2018.

== See also ==
- List of townships in Ontario
- Limberlost Forest and Wildlife Reserve
