= Crockett, Texas =

- City
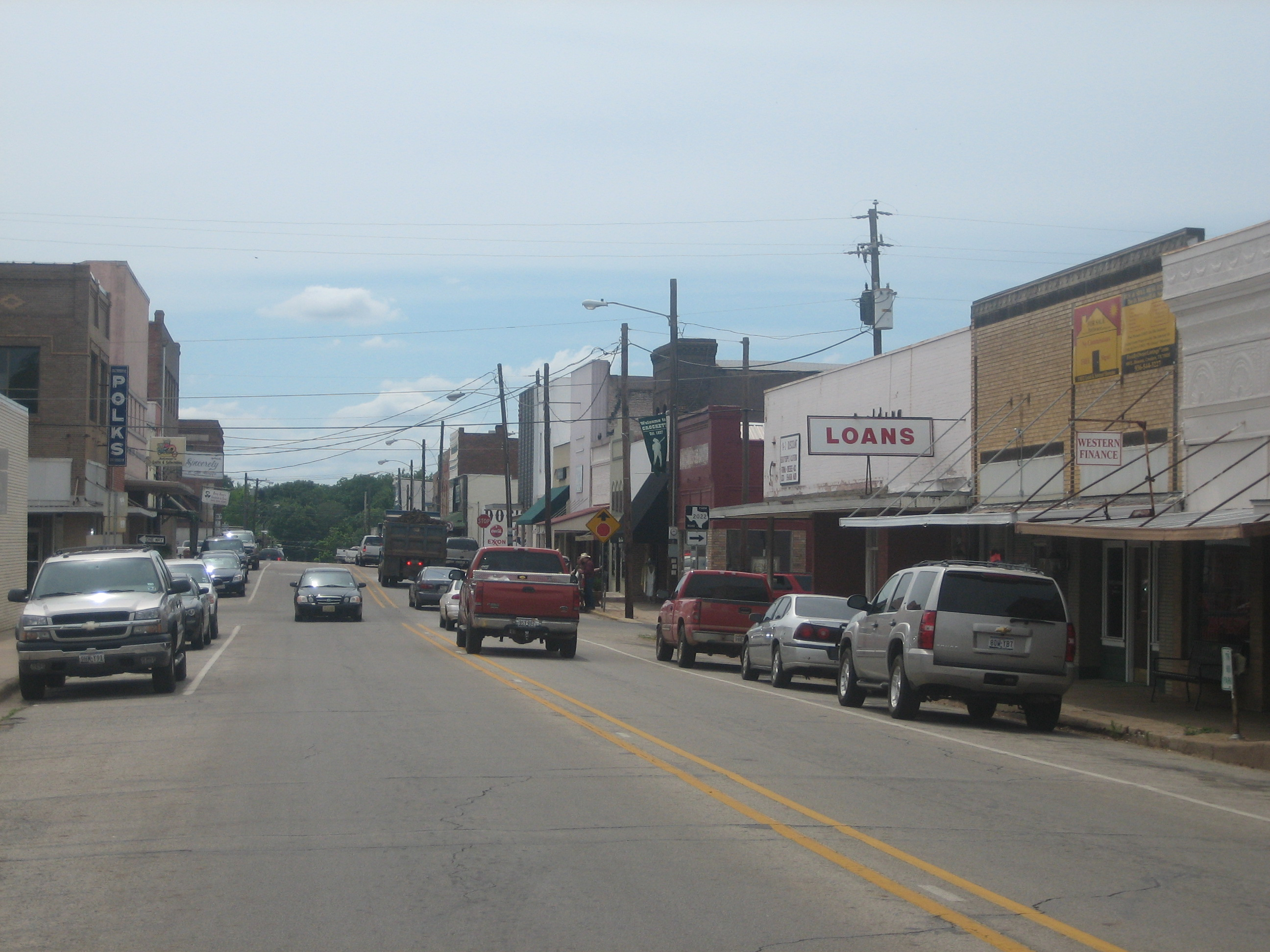
- Downtown Crockett, Texas

- Seal
- Nickname: Paradise in the Pines
- Location of Crockett, Texas
- Coordinates: 31°19′04″N 95°27′23″W
- Country: United States
- State: Texas
- County: Houston

Government
  - Type: Council-Manager

Area
  - Total: 8.85 sq mi (22.93 km^{2})
  - Land: 8.85 sq mi (22.92 km^{2})
  - Water: 0 sq mi (0.00 km^{2})
- Elevation: 367 ft (112 m)

Population (2020)
  - Total: 6,332
  - Density: 721.4/sq mi (278.53/km^{2})
- Time zone: UTC-6 (Central (CST))
  - Summer (DST): UTC-5 (CDT)
- ZIP code: 75835
- Area code: 936
- FIPS code: 48-17744
- GNIS feature ID: 2410266
- Website: www.crocketttexas.org

Crockett is a city and the county seat of Houston County, Texas, United States. As of the 2020 census, the city population was 6,332. Houston County is the oldest county and Crockett the fifth-oldest city in Texas.

== History ==
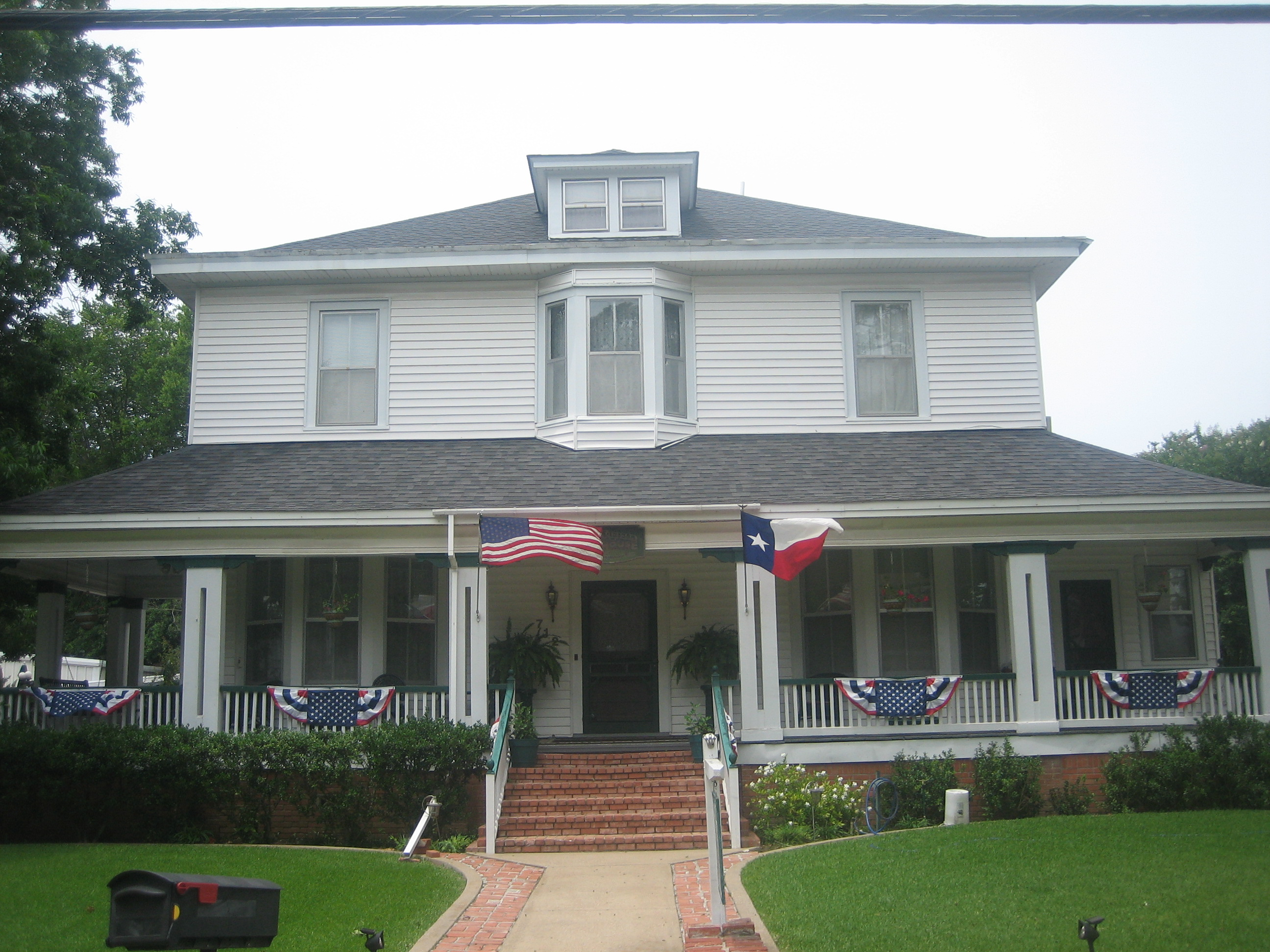
Warfield House in Crockett

The town was named after Davy Crockett, who had camped nearby on his way to the Alamo; the site was very near the Old San Antonio Road. Andrew Edwards Gossett, a Texas Revolution soldier from Maury, Tennessee, along with his father and brother, donated the land for the town in 1836, and named it after Crockett, whom they had previously known. The town was incorporated in 1837, and a post office was granted the following year. Crockett was connected to Nacogdoches by stage service. In 1839 raids by the Alabama-Coushatta and Cherokee Indians forced the town's residents to take shelter in the fortified log courthouse. Crockett was a training center for Confederate conscripts during the Civil War.

The railroad came through in 1872, enabling Crockett to exploit the county's timber resources. By 1885 the town was thriving with a population of 1,200, and the following year a school was opened for black girls. It evolved into Mary Allen Junior College, which operated into the 1970s. In 1904 lignite mining started, peaking about 1910. The stands of timber were seriously depleted by the 1920s. The population was over 3,000 in the mid-1920s, and by 1936 it was nearly 4,500. The population of Crockett increased while most of East Texas declined after World War II. It had reached 5,000 by the 1960 census.

On March 28, 1956, one of the first loop roads in the nation (Loop 304) was built around the city. This traffic reliever was procured through the works of heavyweight politicians who called Crockett home. Blues singer Lightnin' Hopkins was once arrested in Crockett. In recent years, the economy of Crockett has expanded with the construction of new retail space on Loop 304. Several historic buildings in downtown have been renovated to accommodate new office and service space. Renewed interest in reserves of natural gas in the surrounding area has led to construction of energy infrastructure and receipt of royalty revenues for land.

In late 2022, the now popular Crockett Insider satire page was founded on Facebook. The page has gained popularity with a number of humorous posts with one of the most popular being a satire post about the infamous Timeout club in Tyler, Tx mentioned in Whiskey Myer's hit song "Broken Window Serenade," jokingly being reopened in Crockett, Tx. Many residents enjoyed the humor, while many others who believed it were real expressed their anger in comments and local posts. There were even reports of residents reaching out to city leaders to voice their opposition to such a business being opened in Crockett.

In 2023, the local Walmart commissioned a mural for their store. When a photo of the completed mural was published in the newspaper, African Americans were outraged that it included cotton plants. Walmart later removed the mural.

== Government and infrastructure ==
The United States Postal Service operates the Crockett Post Office.

The Texas Youth Commission operated the Crockett State School in Crockett. However, the facility closed on or around August 31, 2011 and is no longer in operation.

History was made in Crockett on Monday, May 13, 2019, as Dr. Ianthia Fisher became the first African-American female to be sworn in as the city's mayor.

== Geography ==
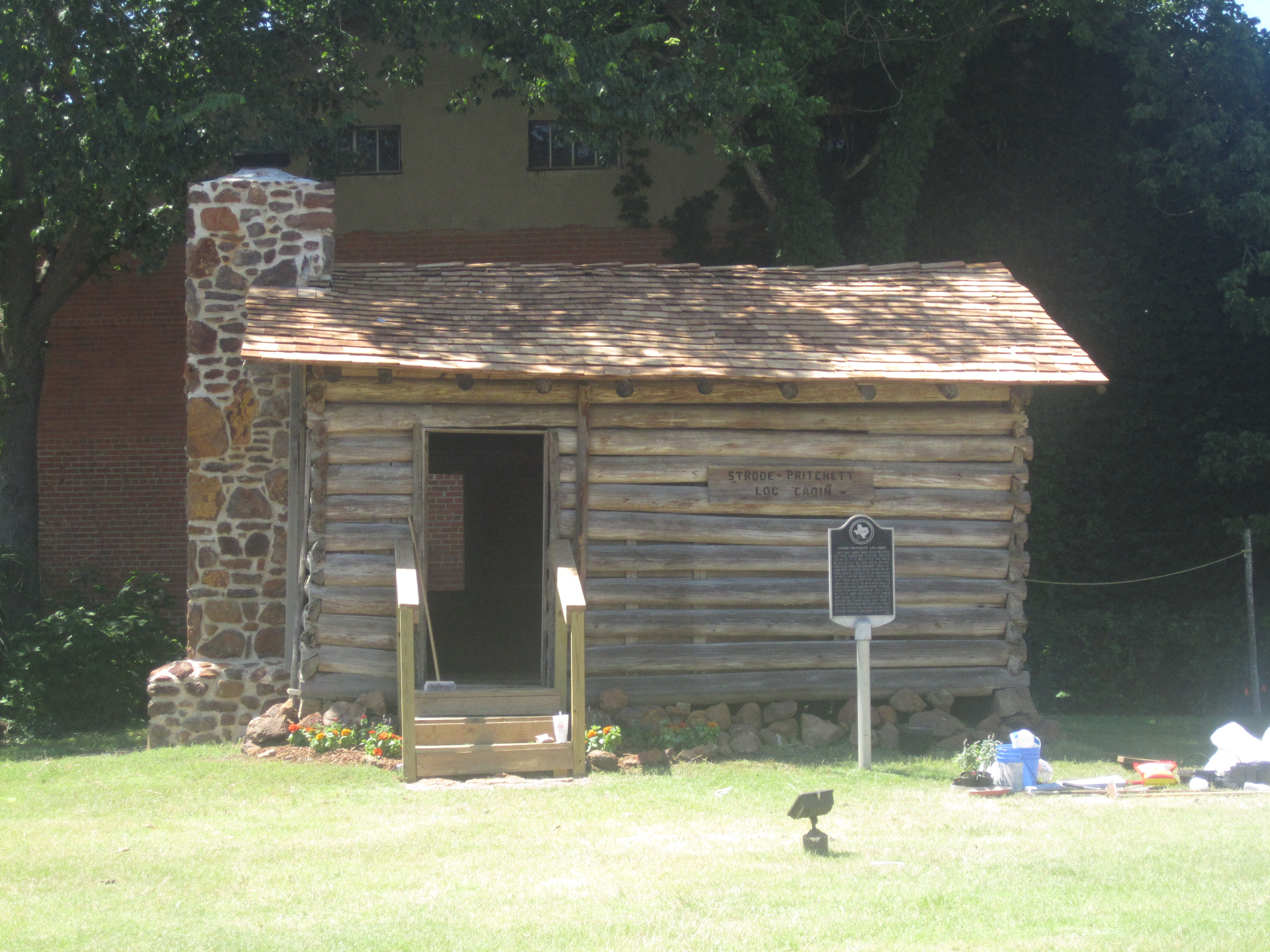
The historic Strode-Pritchett Cabin was located to Crockett for the 1976 bicentennial. At the site is a painting of Davy Crockett by the artist Lucas Short.

Crockett is located near the center of Houston County. Several highways converge on the city. U.S. Route 287 leads north 35 miles (56 km) to Palestine and southeast 46 miles (74 km) to Corrigan. Texas State Highway 21 leads northeast 33 miles (53 km) to Alto and southwest 38 miles (61 km) to Madisonville at Interstate 45. State Highway 7 leads east 54 miles (87 km) to Nacogdoches and west 33 miles (53 km) to Centerville along I-45. State Highway 19 leads south from Crockett 48 miles (77 km) to Huntsville.

According to the United States Census Bureau, Crockett has a total area of 8.8 square miles (22.9 km^{2}), all land. The city is within the Trinity River watershed, with the north side of the city draining toward Hurricane Bayou, which joins the Trinity River west of Crockett, and the south side draining toward Gail Creek, a tributary of White Rock Creek, which joins the Trinity at Lake Livingston.

The terrain of the town is hilly, and (as with many East Texas towns) contains significant forest, mostly loblolly pine and pecan trees.

=== Climate ===
The climate in this area is characterized by hot, humid summers and generally mild to cool winters. According to the Köppen climate classification, Crockett has a humid subtropical climate, Cfa on climate maps.

Climate data for Crockett, Texas (1991–2020 normals, extremes 1904–1917, 1948–present)
Month	Jan	Feb	Mar	Apr	May	Jun	Jul	Aug	Sep	Oct	Nov	Dec	Year
Record high °F (°C)	86 (30)	95 (35)	91 (33)	96 (36)	100 (38)	106 (41)	110 (43)	114 (46)	110 (43)	101 (38)	91 (33)	93 (34)	114 (46)
Mean maximum °F (°C)	76.4 (24.7)	80.1 (26.7)	84.0 (28.9)	88.1 (31.2)	93.2 (34.0)	97.4 (36.3)	101.2 (38.4)	102.6 (39.2)	98.8 (37.1)	92.6 (33.7)	84.4 (29.1)	78.6 (25.9)	103.6 (39.8)
Mean daily maximum °F (°C)	59.1 (15.1)	63.1 (17.3)	70.2 (21.2)	77.6 (25.3)	84.3 (29.1)	91.0 (32.8)	94.4 (34.7)	95.3 (35.2)	89.8 (32.1)	80.3 (26.8)	69.0 (20.6)	61.2 (16.2)	77.9 (25.5)
Daily mean °F (°C)	47.5 (8.6)	51.6 (10.9)	58.2 (14.6)	65.3 (18.5)	73.4 (23.0)	80.3 (26.8)	83.1 (28.4)	83.4 (28.6)	77.8 (25.4)	67.7 (19.8)	56.9 (13.8)	49.5 (9.7)	66.2 (19.0)
Mean daily minimum °F (°C)	35.9 (2.2)	40.1 (4.5)	46.3 (7.9)	53.0 (11.7)	62.5 (16.9)	69.5 (20.8)	71.8 (22.1)	71.5 (21.9)	65.9 (18.8)	55.1 (12.8)	44.8 (7.1)	37.9 (3.3)	54.5 (12.5)
Mean minimum °F (°C)	22.4 (−5.3)	27.6 (−2.4)	31.2 (−0.4)	38.1 (3.4)	49.0 (9.4)	63.0 (17.2)	68.2 (20.1)	66.9 (19.4)	54.4 (12.4)	40.7 (4.8)	28.8 (−1.8)	25.1 (−3.8)	20.3 (−6.5)
Record low °F (°C)	6 (−14)	0 (−18)	18 (−8)	30 (−1)	37 (3)	48 (9)	54 (12)	55 (13)	39 (4)	27 (−3)	17 (−8)	0 (−18)	0 (−18)
Average precipitation inches (mm)	4.13 (105)	3.80 (97)	3.44 (87)	3.68 (93)	4.79 (122)	5.05 (128)	2.53 (64)	3.44 (87)	3.64 (92)	4.45 (113)	3.81 (97)	4.56 (116)	47.32 (1,202)
Average precipitation days (≥ 0.01 in)	8.5	8.2	7.4	6.5	7.0	7.3	5.6	5.7	5.7	5.9	6.8	8.5	83.1
Source: NOAA

== Demographics ==
Historical population
Census	Pop.	Note	%±
1850	150		—
1860	319		112.7%
1870	538		68.7%
1880	599		11.3%
1890	1,445		141.2%
1900	2,612		80.8%
1910	3,947		51.1%
1920	3,061		−22.4%
1930	4,441		45.1%
1940	4,536		2.1%
1950	5,932		30.8%
1960	5,356		−9.7%
1970	6,616		23.5%
1980	7,405		11.9%
1990	7,024		−5.1%
2000	7,141		1.7%
2010	6,950		−2.7%
2020	6,332		−8.9%
U.S. Decennial Census

As of the 2020 census, Crockett had a population of 6,332 people, 2,573 households, and 1,421 families residing in the city.

The median age was 39.6 years. 25.6% of residents were under the age of 18 and 19.6% of residents were 65 years of age or older. For every 100 females there were 83.3 males, and for every 100 females age 18 and over there were 78.1 males age 18 and over.

There were 2,573 households in Crockett, of which 32.4% had children under the age of 18 living in them. Of all households, 33.2% were married-couple households, 19.2% were households with a male householder and no spouse or partner present, and 42.1% were households with a female householder and no spouse or partner present. About 34.9% of all households were made up of individuals and 16.9% had someone living alone who was 65 years of age or older.

There were 3,025 housing units, of which 14.9% were vacant. The homeowner vacancy rate was 3.4% and the rental vacancy rate was 8.3%.

93.7% of residents lived in urban areas, while 6.3% lived in rural areas.

=== Racial and ethnic composition ===
Racial composition as of the 2020 census
Race	Number	Percent
White	2,282	36.0%
Black or African American	2,674	42.2%
American Indian and Alaska Native	48	0.8%
Asian	60	0.9%
Native Hawaiian and Other Pacific Islander	3	0.0%
Some other race	749	11.8%
Two or more races	516	8.1%
Hispanic or Latino (of any race)	1,318	20.8%

=== 2000 census ===
As of the 2000 census, 7,141 people, 2,672 households, and 1,747 families were residing in the city. The population density was 805.6 people per square mile (311.2/km^{2}). The 3,081 housing units averaged 347.6 per square mile (134.3/km^{2}). The racial makeup of the city was 48.54% White, 44.67% African American, 0.36% Native American, 0.46% Asian, 0.14% Pacific Islander, 4.78% from other races, and 1.05% from two or more races. Hispanics or Latinos of any race were 10.50% of the population.

Of the 2,672 households, 31.1% had children under the age of 18 living with them, 38.5% were married couples living together, 23.3% had a female householder with no husband present, and 34.6% were not families. About 31.3% of all households were made up of individuals, and 16.7% had someone living alone who was 65 years of age or older. The average household size was 2.46, and the average family size was 3.08.

In the city, the age distribution was 29.8% under 18, 8.9% from 18 to 24, 23.1% from 25 to 44, 19.2% from 45 to 64, and 18.9% who were 65 or older. The median age was 35 years. For every 100 females, there were 85.5 males. For every 100 females age 18 and over, there were 75.5 males.

The median income for a household in the city was $21,455, and for a family was $27,069. Males had a median income of $26,098 versus $18,674 for females. The per capita income for the city was $11,708. About 26.6% of families and 33.9% of the population were below the poverty line, including 44.6% of those under age 18 and 26.0% of those age 65 or over. Crockett is one of the poorest cities in the United States.

== Education ==
=== Public schools ===
Most of the city is served by the Crockett Independent School District, although a few acres of the city limits are within the Latexo Independent School District.

== Notable people ==
- John Arledge, actor
- Les Beasley, gospel music performer
- Jerald Clark, retired Major League Baseball player (San Diego Padres)
- Phil Clark, retired Major League Baseball player, coach of the Detroit Tigers AA team
- Ja'Gared Davis, NFL and CFL football player
- Myrtis Dightman, champion rodeo bull rider
- Jamie Easterly, pitcher for the Atlanta Braves, Milwaukee Brewers, and Cleveland Indians
- Edd Hargett, quarterback for Texas A&M University, New Orleans Saints and Houston Oilers
- Sam Hinton, folk music singer
- Eugene Lockhart, Dallas Cowboys linebacker from the 1980s
- Cartier Martin, former NBA and international basketball player born in Crockett
- Rain Phoenix, actress, musician, and singer born in Crockett
- River Phoenix, actor, lived in Crockett
- Claude Riley, retired basketball player
- Kenny Rogers, country music singer
- Lucille Elizabeth Bishop Smith (1892–1985), entrepreneur, chef, and inventor born in Crockett
- Jim Turner, former U.S. representative from Texas, Democrat
- Joe Washington, NFL player born in Crockett
