= James McKie =

James McKie may refer to:

- James McKie (footballer, born 1873) (1873–?), Scottish footballer who played in the 1890s for Southampton, Chatham and Dartford
- James McKie (businessman) (1859–1910), Scottish businessman with Jardine, Matheson and Co.
- James McKie (publisher) (1816–1891), Scottish publisher and collector of Robert Burns' works

== See also ==
- James McKee (disambiguation)
- James Mackie (disambiguation)
