= Wenonah II =

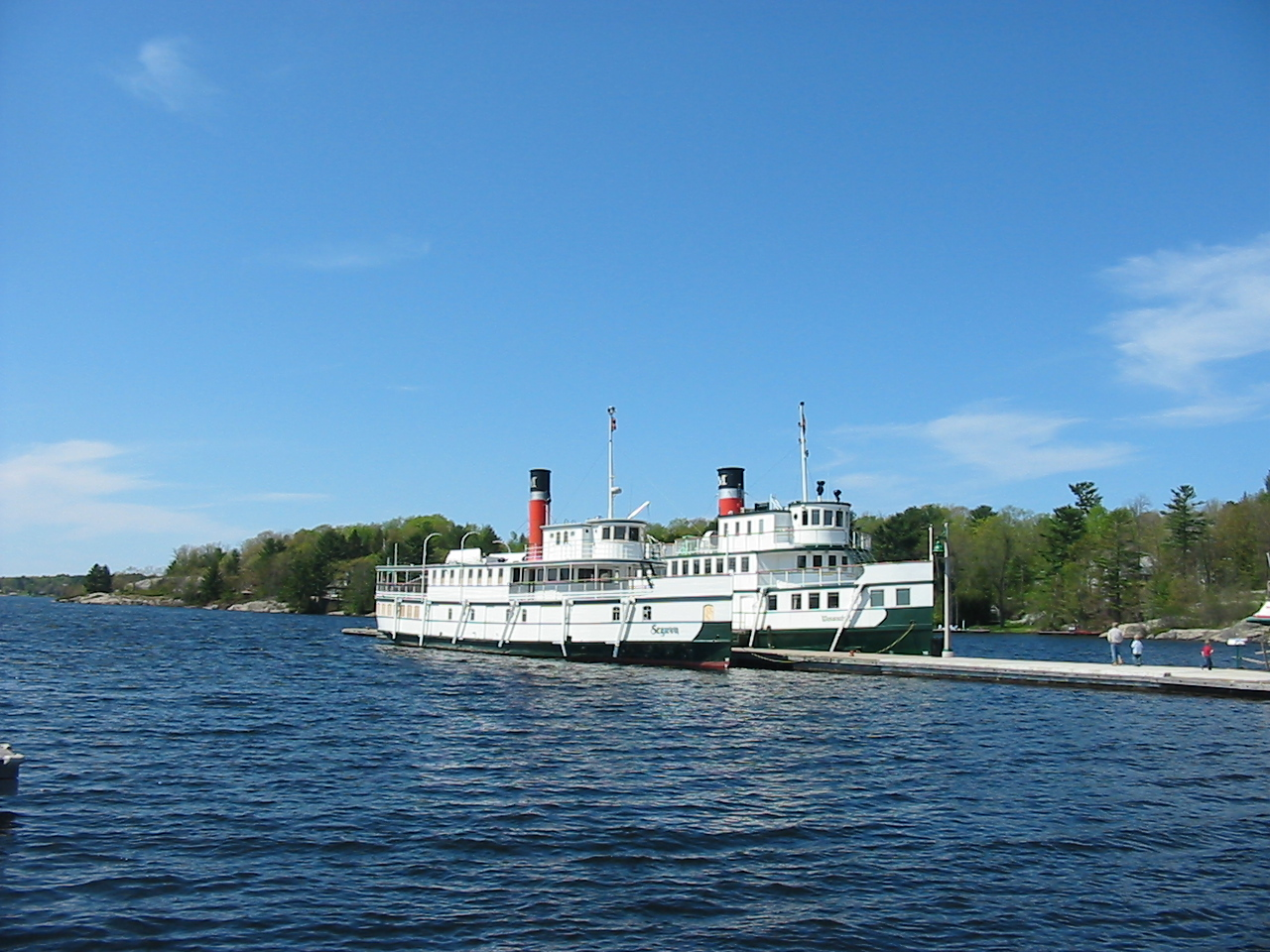
- The foreground vessel is the historic RMS Segwun the rear vessel is Wenonah II.

History
- Operator: Muskoka Steamships
- Completed: 2002

General characteristics
- Length: 126 ft (38 m)

Wenonah II is a modern excursion vessel constructed to offer passengers the look and feel of the early 20th century steamships. She is homeported in Gravenhurst, Ontario, and is operated by Muskoka Steamships, which also operates RMS Segwun. Segwun is the last surviving original steamship from the fleet of several dozen that served the county of Muskoka, Ontario in the late 19th and early 20th centuries.

As a road network was built the steamships became less useful and were either broken up, or not replaced when they were lost. The final two ships, Segwun and RMS Sagamo were retired in 1958. Sagamo was destroyed by a fire in 1969. In 1972, volunteers started to restore Segwun. In 1981 she started to carry sightseers on the lakes, and to host dinner cruises. She is the oldest steamship in North America.

Her cruises were so popular that Segwun's operators decided to construct a modern replica, inspired by the original vessels, named Wenonah II, to supplement the historic Segwun. The modern replica was completed in 2002 and while she has the appearance of an early twentieth century steamship, she has modern conveniences, like air conditioning, and an elevator.

She is larger than Segwun, and also carries sightseers and dinner cruises.

The first passenger to board the inaugural voyage of the Wenonah II was 9 year old Mark Timpson. Mark had followed the ship's construction with great interest. He and his father lined up for several hours, so that Mark could board first. Mark was featured in the local newspaper as ‘First Passenger’ and was again featured for 10th and 20th anniversary cruises.
