= Jim McKay (disambiguation) =

Jim McKay (1921–2008) was an American television sports journalist.

Jim McKay may also refer to:

- Jim McKay (director), American television director
- Jim McKay (footballer) (1918–1986), Scottish footballer
- Jim McKay (rugby union), Australian rugby union football coach
