= James McKee =

James McKee may refer to:

- James McKee (footballer), Scottish footballer of the 1890s and early 1900s
- James Y. McKee, (1836–1891), American interim president of Pennsylvania State University
- Jim McKee (1947–2002), American baseball pitcher

== See also ==
- Jaimes McKee (born 1987), English-born Hong Kong footballer
- James McKie (disambiguation)
- James McKay (disambiguation)
