= Beaumaris (disambiguation) =

Beaumaris is a town and community on the Isle of Anglesey in Wales.

Beaumaris may also refer to:

- Beaumaris Castle
- Beaumaris Gaol
- Beaumaris (UK Parliament constituency)
- Beaumaris Bay a bay in Victoria, Australia
- Beaumaris, Edmonton, a neighbourhood in Edmonton, Canada.
- Beaumaris, Ontario, a settlement on Lake Muskoka in Ontario, Canada
- Beaumaris, Tasmania, a small town in Tasmania
- Beaumaris, Victoria, a suburb in Melbourne, Victoria, Australia.
