= James McKay =

James McKay may refer to:

- James McKay (Canadian politician) (1862–1931), Canadian member of parliament
- James McKay (fur trader) (1828–1879), Canadian fur trader, interpreter, and politician
- James Iver McKay (1793–1853), United States representative from North Carolina
- James Wilson McKay (1912–1992), Scottish freemason, Lord Provost of Edinburgh
- James McKay (industrialist) (1830–1906), Pittsburgh industrialist and founder of James McKay & Co chain manufacturers
- James McKay Sr. (1808–1876), mayor of Tampa, Florida
- James McKay (New Brunswick politician) (1836–1916), farmer and political figure in New Brunswick, Canada
- James Russell McKay (1889–1966), American football player
- James C. McKay (1917–2015), American trial lawyer
- James McKay (footballer) (1901–1997), English footballer
- Jim McKay (footballer) (1918–1986), Scottish footballer

== See also ==
- Jim McKay (1921–2008), American journalist
- Jim McKay (director), American film and television director, producer and writer
- James MacKay (disambiguation)
- James Mackey (disambiguation)
- James Mackie (disambiguation)
