= James Mackay =

James, Jim, or Jim Mackay may refer to:

== Law and politics ==
- James Mackay (New Zealand politician, born 1804) (1804–1875), New Zealand MP
- James Mackay (New Zealand politician, born 1831) (1831–1912), New Zealand farmer, explorer and member of the Auckland Provincial Council
- James Mackay, 1st Earl of Inchcape (1852–1932), British colonial administrator
- James Alexander Kenneth Mackay (1859–1935), Australian politician, writer and military leader
- James Armstrong MacKay (1919–2004), US representative from Georgia
- James Mackay, Baron Mackay of Clashfern (1927–2026), Scottish lawyer and former Lord Chancellor
- James MacKay (New Hampshire politician), member of the New Hampshire House of Representatives

== Sports ==
- James Mackay (cricketer) (1880–1953), Australian cricketer
- James Mackay (rugby union) (1905–1985), New Zealand rugby union player
- Jimmy Mackay (1943–1998), Australian footballer
- Jim "Bones" Mackay (born 1965), American golf caddy for Phil Mickelson

== Others ==
- James Mackay (British Army officer) (1718–1785), Scottish captain in the British Army during the French and Indian War
- James Townsend Mackay (1775–1862), Scottish botanist who lived in Ireland
- James A. Mackay (1936–2007), Scottish historian and philatelist
- James Mackay (film producer) (born 1954), British film producer
- James Mackay (actor) (born 1984), Australian actor

== See also ==
- James McKay (disambiguation)
- James Mackey (disambiguation)
- James Mackie (disambiguation)
