= James Mackey =

James or Jim Mackey may refer to:

- Sir James Mackey (mayor) (1813–1892), Lord Mayor of Dublin
- Jim Mackey (footballer) (1897–1990), English footballer
- Biz Mackey (James Raleigh Mackey, 1897–1965), American catcher and manager in Negro league baseball
- James Page Mackey (1913–2009), chief of the Metropolitan Toronto Police
- James Mackey (theologian) (1934–2020), Irish Catholic theologian
- Sir Jim Mackey (healthcare administrator) (born 1966), British NHS executive
- James Mackey (poker player) (born 1986), American professional poker player

== See also ==
- James Mackie (disambiguation)
- James Mackay (disambiguation)
- James McKay (disambiguation)
