= Henry Kirke Porter =

American politician

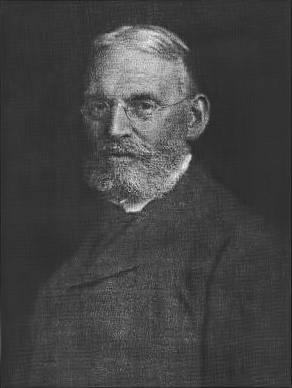

Member of the U.S. House of Representatives from Pennsylvania's 31st district
- In office March 4, 1903 – March 3, 1905
- Preceded by: district created
- Succeeded by: James F. Burke

Personal details
- Born: November 24, 1840 Concord, New Hampshire, U.S.
- Died: April 10, 1921 (aged 80) Washington, D.C., U.S.
- Party: Independent Republican
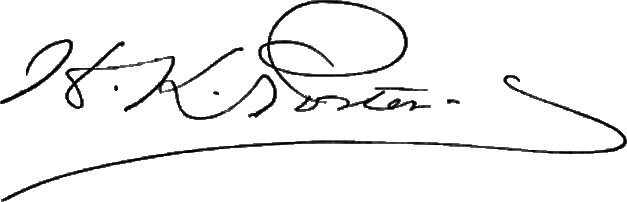
- Signature

Henry Kirke Porter (November 24, 1840 – April 10, 1921) was an American businessman and politician. Porter served as U.S. Representative for Pennsylvania's 31st congressional district as an Independent Republican from 1903 to 1905.

== Early life and education ==
Porter was born in Concord, New Hampshire on November 24, 1840. In 1860, he graduated from Brown University in Providence, Rhode Island. He also helped found the YMCA that year. He attended the Newton Theological Seminary in Newton Center, Massachusetts.

In 1862, he enlisted in the 45th Regiment, Massachusetts Volunteer Militia, and was mustered out in July 1863. He continued his theological training at the Rochester Theological Seminary in Rochester, New York.

== Career ==
In 1866, Porter was given a gift of $20,000 by his father, which changed the course of his life. He invested that money with a partner, John Y. Smith, and formed the Smith & Porter Machine works. They opened a small shop in Pittsburgh, Pennsylvania, which grew to become H.K. Porter, Inc. Porter served as president of the company.

He was President of the Pittsburgh YMCA from 1868 to 1887, and was President of the Western Pennsylvania Institute for the Blind in 1904. He served in the United States House of Representatives in the 58th United States Congress from 1903 to 1905 as an Independent Republican. Porter represented Pennsylvania's 31st congressional district.

== Later life and death ==
He was a member of the Jekyll Island Club (aka The millionaires Club) on Jekyll Island, Georgia. He continued as President of H.K. Porter, Inc. until his death at age 80 in Washington, D.C. on April 10, 1921. He was buried in the Allegheny Cemetery in Pittsburgh.

U.S. House of Representatives
Preceded by None (district created in 1903)	Member of the U.S. House of Representatives from Pennsylvania's 31st congressional district 1903–1905	Succeeded by James F. Burke
