= SS Sagamo =

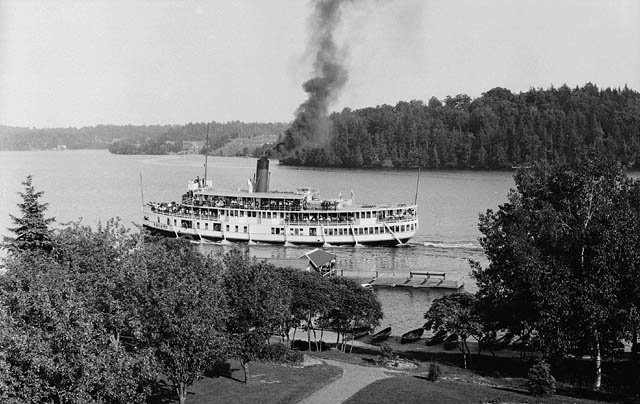
- SS Sagamo leaving Elgin House, Lake Joseph, circa 1907

History
- Name: RMS Sagamo
- Owner: Muskoka Lakes Navigation and Hotel Company
- Port of registry: Canada
- Ordered: 1905
- Builder: Canadian Ship Building Company and Muskoka Lakes Navigation and Hotel Company
- Laid down: 1905
- Launched: 25 July 1906
- Maiden voyage: 15 June 1907
- Fate: Destroyed by fire 1969

General characteristics
- Tonnage: 420 registered, 744 actual
- Length: 152 feet
- Beam: 29 feet
- Draft: 9 feet
- Propulsion: two reciprocating steam engines
- Speed: 18 mph
- Capacity: 800
- Crew: 26

The SS Sagamo was a large steamer. The ship was designed in 1905 and built in Ontario before being launched in 1906. She took her maiden voyage on 15 June 1907. The vessel was the largest steamer on any of the minor lakes in Ontario and it was operated as the trunk carrier of the Navigation Company system.

With the outbreak of World War I, the Sagamo was laid up for the 1917 and 1918 but returned to service after the war. Following the 1925 season when the Sagamo was being laid up for the winter she suffered the first of two major fires. The fire consumed the bulk of the ship's superstructure forward of the stack but management chose to rebuild the ship as the engines and machinery were intact. The stock market crash of 1929 and the depression of the 1930s would prove the ultimate undoing of the Sagamo and the other steamers of the Muskoka Lakes. In order to create jobs, the government engaged in a widespread program of road construction. World War II temporarily lifted the fortunes of the steamship line and the Sagamo. Following the war, however, the newfound prosperity brought a resurgence in automotive traffic. At the end of the 1949 season, a fire onboard the SS Noronic, ushered in new fire control requirements on steamships. The Muskoka Lakes Lines, then owner of the Sagamo, already suffering from declining passenger and freight business, lacked the resources to re-fit the entire fleet. The Sagamo was upgraded but after being sold in 1955, the ship was retired in 1958.

New owners bought the steamer with the intention of turning it into a restaurant but the restaurant was not a success and closed in 1963. She was sold again in 1968 but a fire broke out on 10 January 1969 which burned the entire wooden portion of the vessel, leaving only the steel hull. In 1980 she was partially cut up and the remains left to deteriorate near the Muskoka Wharf. Part of her steel hull can be seen by the Muskoka Wharf boat launch.

== Construction ==
The SS Sagamo was designed in 1905 by naval architect Arendt Engstrom of Cleveland, based roughly on the design of the SS Cayuga a ship on the Toronto to Niagara run which Engstrom had just completed designing. The ship's steel hull was fabricated by the Canadian Ship Building Company in Toronto and was assembled at the Gravenhurst yard of the Muskoka Lakes Navigation and Hotel Company, the ship's owner and operator. The hull was riveted steel with a steel frame above and a wooden superstructure. She was powered by two Triple expansion steam engines and four Scotch marine boilers, developing 68.8 horsepower for a top speed of 18 mph.

The Sagamo was designed with two full decks above the hull, and two additional partial decks above those. On the main deck was the galley and the dining room which seated 90 people, and the washrooms. The promenade deck above had forward and aft lounges. On the third deck was a smoking lounge. The ship could hold 800 passengers with luggage along with a crew of 26.

The ship was launched on 25 July 1906 in Gravenhurst and christened Sagamo or "big chief". She was towed to the Navigation Company shipyard to be completed. Her engines were tested in October, 1906 and she took her maiden voyage on 15 June 1907.

== Cruising career ==
=== Beginning ===
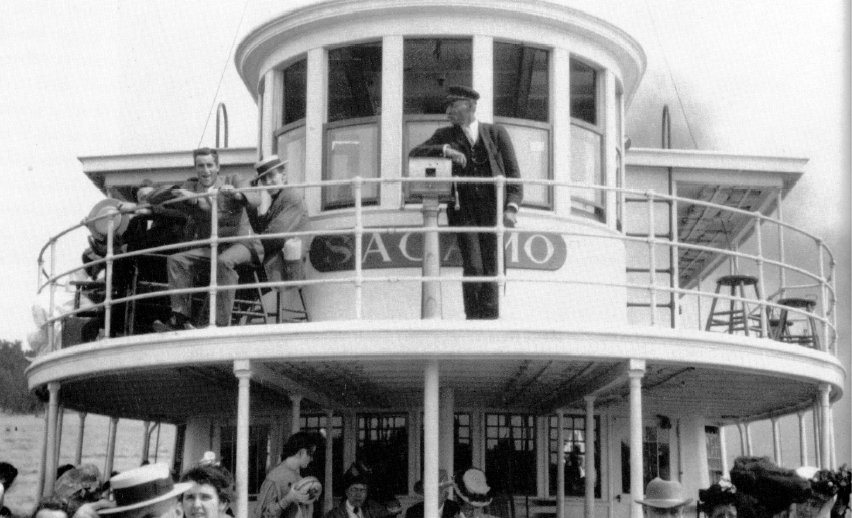
Pilothouse of the Sagamo on her first season in 1907 with Commodore Bailey on the bridge

Sagamo began her cruising career with the 1907 season, her maiden voyage taking place on 15 June under Commodore George Bailey, her first Captain. That year the Grand Trunk Railway expanded their station at Muskoka Wharf in Gravenhurst to accommodate the greater volume of traffic transferring from their trains to the Navigation Company's steamers.

Flagship of the Navigation Company's line, Sagamo was the largest steamer on any of the minor lakes in Ontario. Her size restricted where she could go. For instance she made only one trip to Bala, and it was such a harrowing experience it was never repeated. She never sailed up the Muskoka River to Bracebridge. Instead the Sagamo operated as the trunk carrier of the system, carrying traffic from the Muskoka Wharf in Gravenhurst to Beaumaris, Port Carling, Windermere, the Royal Muskoka Hotel, (also owned by the Navigation Company), and finally to Port Cockburn where she would exchange passengers with some of the company's smaller steamers who would then carry them to the smaller ports of call. Sometimes the passenger exchange would take place mid-lake.

=== World War I ===
The outbreak of World War I brought a depression to Muskoka Lakes tourism as the country turned its resources to materiel and many young men went overseas in uniform. By this point the number of steamers run by the Navigation company had grown to nine, but an accident put the Nipissing out of commission in 1915, (permanently, as it turns out, with the hull later to be resurrected as the RMS Segwun). In 1917 reflecting lower demand and higher priorities for the war, the Grand Trunk eliminated the overnight run to Gravenhurst and the number of day trains to two. As a result, the Sagamo was laid up for the 1917 and 1918 seasons at the company's facilities in Gravenhurst. After the war business picked up, and the loss of the Kenozha and Charlie M to fire left the company with only six ships to meet demand; the Sagamo was back in business.

=== Expanded vision ===
In the 1922 season, Commodore Bailey retired after a 55-year career and 15 years with the Sagamo. He was replaced by Captain Ralph Lee who had been Mate under Bailey. Shortly thereafter Lee proposed expanding the company's vision from simple transportation of tourists to more of a cruising destination. Management agreed and purchased property at the head of Little Lake Joseph which came to be known as "Natural Park" and served as a stretching point for what came to be known as the "One Hundred Mile Cruise". The Sagamo continued to run the main route from Gravenhurst to Port Cockburn and the smaller ships acted as feeders at the various ports of call. Sightseers now disembarked for an hour at the Natural Park prior to returning to Gravenhurst in the evening.

=== Fire ===
Following the 1925 season when the Sagamo was being laid up for the winter she suffered the first of two major fires. A worker placed a container of oil on the stove not realizing the stove was hot. The contents eventually burst into flames which ignited the wooden superstructure, blazing quickly out of control. Despite the efforts of the Gravenhurst Fire Department, the fire consumed the bulk of the ship's superstructure forward of the stack. Damage was estimated at $75,000, but fortunately there were no injuries. Management chose to rebuild the ship when they discovered the engines and machinery were intact and used the opportunity to add fifteen staterooms. This allowed patrons the opportunity to board the ship in the evening so they wouldn't have to arise at 6:30 am to make the normal departure. Work was performed over the winter and the ship was back in service in July 1926.

=== The Great Depression and wartime relief ===
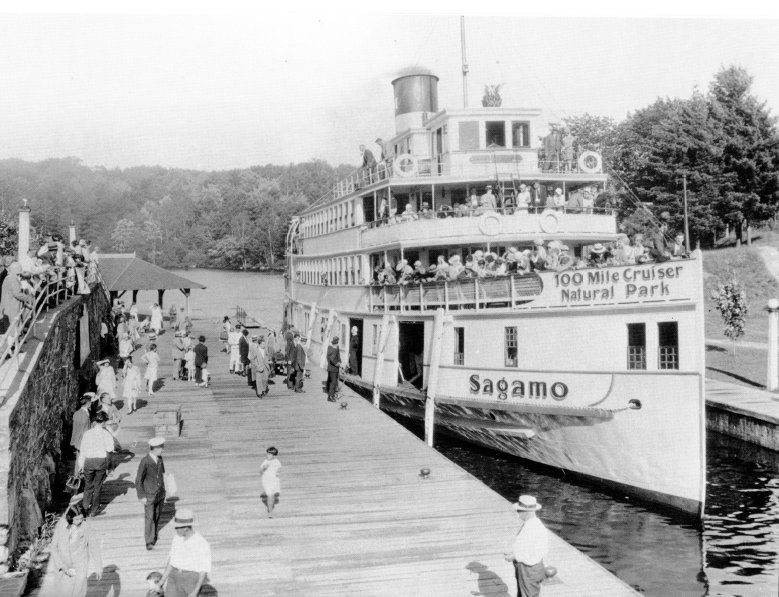
Sagamo passing through the locks at Port Carling circa 1935

The stock market crash of 1929 and the depression of the 1930s hit the company hard. Economic problems also accelerated the development that would prove the ultimate undoing of the Sagamo and the other steamers of the Muskoka Lakes. In order to create jobs, the government engaged in a widespread program of road construction. Not only did the new roads offer tourists the opportunity to reach their vacation destinations without engaging the steamers, it increased the competitiveness of the freight truckers and cut into the Navigation Company's freight revenues at a time it could ill afford the loss. Ironically it was the coming of war (again) which served to lift the fortunes of the steamship line and the Sagamo. Wartime rationing placed severe restrictions on the public's ability to drive and caused a resurgence of interest (and traffic) in public transportation, in a way re-creating the conditions of the early 1900s. A war-weary public looked to vacation closer to home and the Sagamo's One Hundred Mile Cruise saw good business. Management supplemented the cruise by adding a public address system in the ship which brought the live music from the lounge through the entire vessel.

=== Postwar decline ===
Following the war, however, the newfound prosperity brought a resurgence in automotive traffic along with disappointing traffic for the Navigation Company. At the end of the 1949 season an event occurred which would begin the final decline of steamboating in the area. On 16 September 1949 a fire broke out on the SS Noronic, then sailing the Great Lakes and docked at Toronto. Inadequate fire alarms and firefighting equipment allowed the fire to rage out of control resulting in between 118 and 139 deaths. In the aftermath, the Ministry of Transport imposed new fire control requirements on steamships. The Muskoka Lakes Lines, then owner of the Sagamo and the remaining steamships of the Muskoka Lakes Navigation and Hotel Company, already suffering from declining passenger and freight business due to new competition from the automobile and trucking lines, lacked the resources to re-fit the entire fleet. The Muskoka Lakes Lines filed bankruptcy and the ships were repossessed by the Navigation Company who chose to fit the required equipment only on the flagship Sagamo and her companion the Segwun. Sagamo received a complete sprinkler system and an alarm system costing $35,000 and weighing an additional eight tons.

In 1954 the Canadian National Railway, successor to the Grand Trunk Railway closed and abandoned the station at Muskoka Wharf. That same year the company lost its mail contract as trucks could now deliver the mail faster than steamers. In September that year the company sold the steamers, including the Sagamo to Morgan Cyril Penhorwood, an accountant with no boating experience. Pendorwood took delivery in February 1955 in a newly formed company named Gravenhurst Steamships Limited, and retubed the Sagamo's boilers for what would prove to be the last time. In an effort to improve profits fares rose and maintenance was cut, and the ships soon looked shabby. The ship continued running despite more frequent breakdowns until Labor Day, 1958 when she retired.

=== Retirement and end ===
In 1959 the Sagamo was purchased by George Morrison and Jack Vincent along with Segwun and Cherokee who planned to turn her into a restaurant. She was freshly painted and outfitted with $12,000 of furnishings and ran as a restaurant for a time. However the location proved to be too remote from Gravenhurst, and the restaurant was not a success, closing in 1963, after which she was left unused at the wharf. She was sold again in 1968 for $5,000 with plans to again operate her as a restaurant. However, during renovations a fire broke out on 10 January 1969 which burned the entire wooden portion of the vessel, leaving only the steel hull. The remains were sold and towed to West Gravenhurst where the new owner had hopes of restoring her, but in 1980 she was partially cut up and the remains left to deteriorate near the Muskoka Wharf. Part of her steel hull can be seen by the Muskoka Wharf boat launch.
