= RMS Segwun =

Passenger steamship in Canada

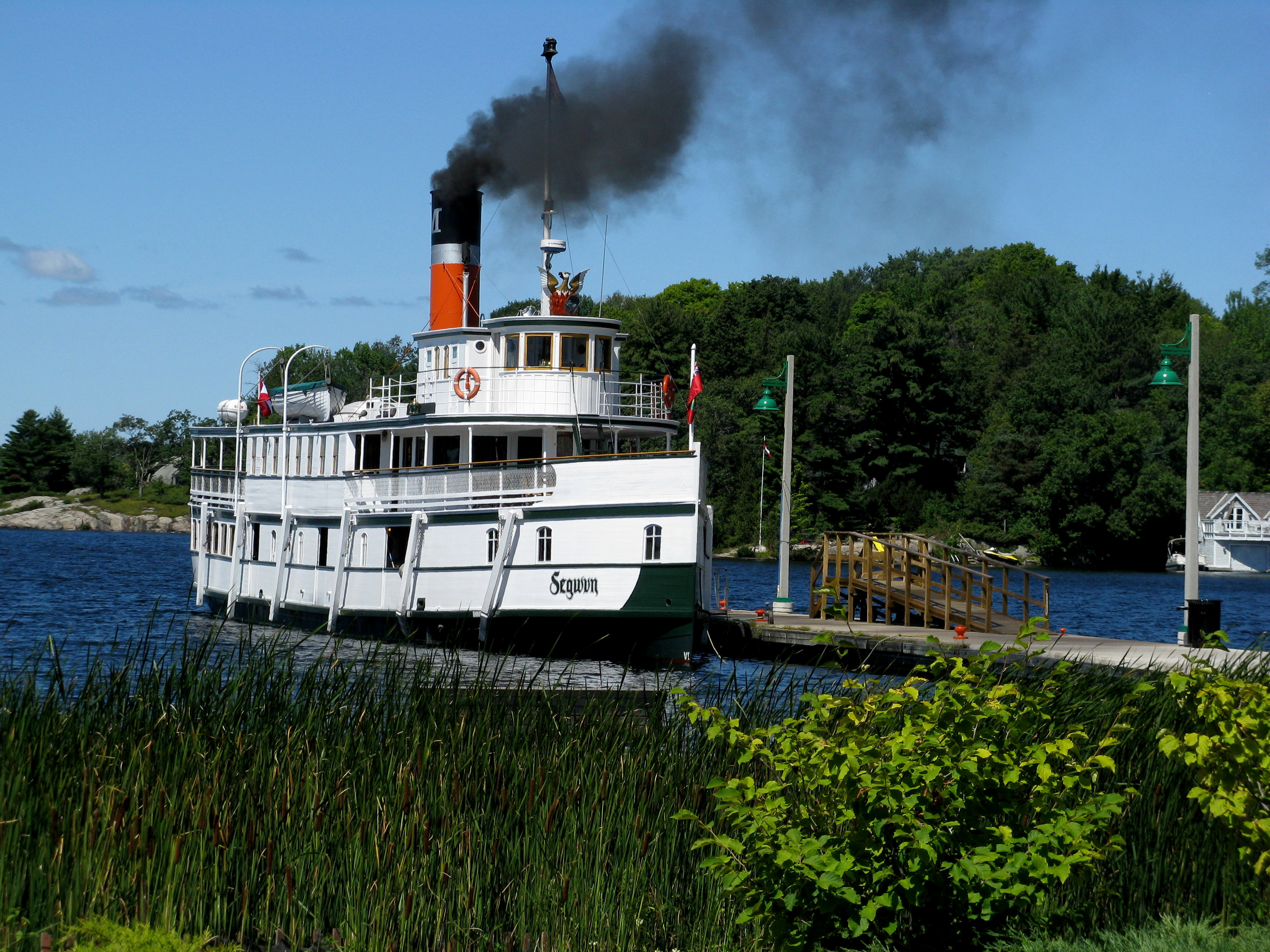
- Segwun approaches dock

History

Canada
- Name: 1887-1925: SS Nipissing; from 1925: RMS Segwun
- Namesake: Lake Nipissing; Ojibwe word for "spring (season)"
- Port of registry: Toronto, Ontario, Canada
- Ordered: 1887
- Builder: M Simpson, Gravenhurst, re-assembled from parts transported from River Clyde, Scotland
- Laid down: 1887
- Launched: 1887
- Completed: 1887, rebuilt 1925
- In service: 1887–1914 as SS Nipissing; 1925–1958 and from 1981 as RMS Segwun
- Out of service: 1914-1925 and 1958–1981
- Identification: Official number 92443
- Status: In service
- Notes: Oldest steam-powered vessel still in use in Canada

General characteristics
- Length: 125 feet
- Beam: 21 feet
- Propulsion: Two reciprocating steam engines, circa 1907, 1914

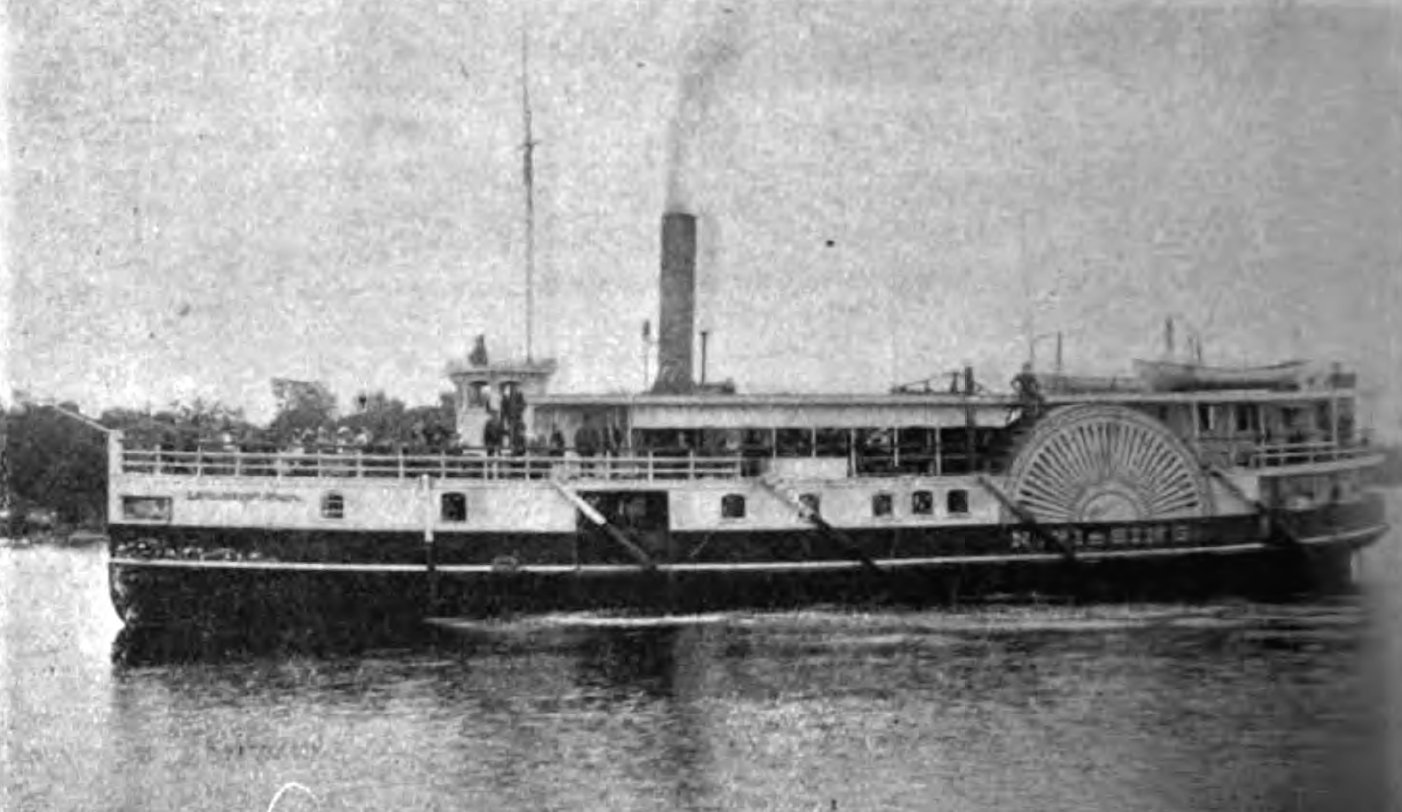
SS Nipissing circa 1893, launched 1887, rebuilt in 1924 as the RMS Segwun

RMS Segwun is the oldest operating steam driven vessel in North America, built in 1887 as Nipissing to cruise Muskoka Lakes in the Muskoka, Ontario, Canada, a resort area with many lakes and rivers. Early in the 20th century, Muskoka was poorly served by roads. Vacationers were transported to lodges, or private cottages, via a fleet of steamships. Segwun is the oldest of only three ships in the world still carrying the status of Royal Mail Ship, and the only steamer.

Ports of call included Gravenhurst, Bracebridge, Beaumaris, Port Sandfield, Port Carling and Bala.

== History ==
=== Construction ===
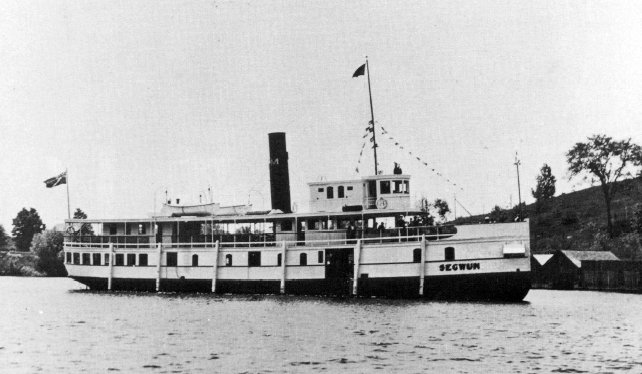
RMS Segwun on her maiden voyage to Bracebridge 9 July 1925. Note the separation between the oak lounge forward, and the gentleman's lounge aft on the upper deck.

In the 1920s the Muskoka Lakes saw strong growth in tourism as the Canadian economy recovered from the trauma of World War I. By 1924 the Muskoka Lakes Navigation Company found that the six steamers then serving the lakes were growing inadequate to the task and looked to add to their fleet. Rather than commission an entirely new boat, management decided to convert the decommissioned SS Nipissing from a paddle-wheeler to a twin propeller passenger steamer. Nipissing's wrought iron hull was built on the Clyde in 1887 and was in service on the lakes from 1887 through 1915. When Segwun was rebuilt on the hull of the second SS Nipissing she was also converted from a side paddle wheel steamer with a walking beam engine into the current two counter-rotating propellers.

The conversion was performed at the Navigation Company's yard in Gravenhurst, Ontario during the fall and winter of 1924–5, at which time the bulk of Nipissing's machinery was removed, including her engines. Workers installed a new Scotch marine boiler along with two secondhand Doty compound steam engines and stack. The bulk of the two lower decks were retained.

A carving of the Phoenix carried atop of Segwun's pilothouse is a replica of the one originally carried on Segwun in 1925. The first Phoenix statue was carved for a second version of SS Nipissing launched in 1887 to replace the original Nipissing destroyed in a fire the previous year. The new version of the Nipissing inherited the engines from the original Nipissing – which had to be raised from the bottom of the lake after the fire, so the second version carried on both the name and steam engine. At the close of the navigation season in 1925, SS Sagamo caught fire while being laid up, so in subsequent years the Phoenix was placed on "the Sag" where it was lost by fire a second time in 1969. SS Sagamo was not rebuilt; however the Phoenix did rise from its ashes and is now carried by the ship for which it was intended.

The ship was launched in June, 1925 for the summer passenger season. While originally she was intended to retain the Nipissing name, the extent of the alterations were so extensive that the Navigation Company chose to rename her Segwun, an Ojibwe word meaning "springtime" (modern orthography ziigwan).

=== Remodel ===
The Navigation Company underwent a change in ownership at the end of World War II, when Major Hugh C. MacLean, publisher, sold his 90% interest in the company to a Toronto businessman, Gordon Douglas Fairley. MacLean had owned his share in the company for several decades and the steamship line benefited from promotion in MacLean's publications. Perhaps anticipating another postwar economic boom similar to the 1920s Fairley made some significant investments in the company's fleet.

In the off season of 1946–7 Segwun was remodeled. The gentleman's lounge and two staterooms toward the aft of the upper deck were removed and a new series of seven carpeted staterooms were added in their place and connected to the forward oak-paneled lounge. The open space formerly present on that deck just aft of the stack was closed in. Additionally a new steel bulkhead salvaged from Medora was installed in the forward hold to create a crew sleeping area. The changes were generally favorable, but at the cost of increasing the craft's sensitivity to the wind. These changes finalized the silhouette of the ship to this day.

=== Refit ===
On 16 September 1949 a fire broke out on SS Noronic, then sailing the Great Lakes and docked at Toronto. Inadequate fire alarms and firefighting equipment allowed the fire to rage out of control resulting in between 118 and 139 deaths. In the aftermath, the Ministry of Transport imposed new fire control requirements on steamships. The Muskoka Lakes Lines, then owner of Segwun and the remaining steamships of the Muskoka Lakes Navigation and Hotel Company, already suffering from declining passenger and freight business due to new competition from the automobile and trucking lines, lacked the resources to re-fit the entire fleet. The Muskoka Lakes Lines filed bankruptcy and the ships were repossessed by the Navigation Company who chose to fit the required equipment only on the flagship Sagamo and her companion Segwun. Segwun was fitted with new hoses and hydrants and sailed the 1950 season, but her occupancy certificate was cut from 243 to only 100 by the Ministry.

=== Accident ===
In the 1958 season Segwun received a new captain to replace the aging crew who had long manned the ship. Unfortunately, on his first trip, the captain bumped the swing bridge at Port Carling, almost disabling it, then later struck the concrete dock at the Lockmaster's house, resulting in a badly dented forepeak.

=== Segwun Museum ===
Most of these vessels on the Muskoka Lakes were broken up or lost to fire, when roads were built. Segwun, and the fleet's former flagship, RMS Sagamo, the last two remaining vessels in service, were retired in 1958 and Segwun spent decades moored at the Town Dock in Gravenhurst. Sagamo, converted into a floating restaurant, was destroyed in a fire in 1969. Segwun Steamboat Museum, moored next to Sagamo, survived the fire.

=== Restoration ===
From 1972 through 1981, Segwun was restored, and put back into service on 27 June 1981. Segwun still maintains its Canada Post 'R.M.S.' designation as an official Royal Mail Ship. As part of a fundraising venture, she once carried her own private label wine which was distributed throughout Ontario by the L.C.B.O. In 2001 & 2002, Segwun was voted 'Best Large Attraction' by Attractions Canada.

== Current operations ==
Segwun now provides short sightseeing excursions, lunch and sunset dinner cruises. She is owned and operated by a registered charity – Muskoka Steamships and Discovery Centre.

== Commemorative stamp tribute ==
In 1987 Canada Post honoured RMS Segwun with a 36 cent commemorative stamp, one of four commemorating the 1987 centennial of Gravenhurst, Ont. A framed enlarged copy of the stamp hangs in the lobby of the Administration Offices of the District Municipality of Muskoka.
