= James F. Burke (politician) =

American politician (1867–1932)

James Francis Burke
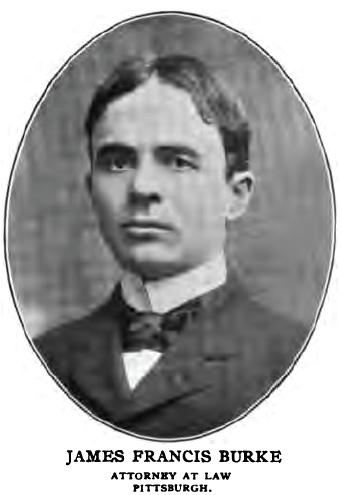

Member of the U.S. House of Representatives from Pennsylvania's 31st district
- In office March 4, 1905 – March 3, 1915
- Preceded by: Henry K. Porter
- Succeeded by: John M. Morin

Chairman of the College Republican National Committee
- In office 1892–1892
- Preceded by: Inaugural Officeholder
- Succeeded by: Delmar Hawkins

Personal details
- Born: October 21, 1867 Petroleum Center, Pennsylvania, U.S.
- Died: August 8, 1932 (aged 64) Washington, D.C., U.S.
- Party: Republican
- Spouse: Josephine Birch Scott
- Children: 2
- Education: University of Michigan Law School

James Francis Burke (October 21, 1867 – August 8, 1932) was an American politician, and a Republican member of the U.S. House of Representatives for Pennsylvania.

== Early life ==
James Burke was born in Petroleum Center, Pennsylvania to Irish immigrants. He studied law at the University of Michigan at Ann Arbor where he graduated 1892. While at Michigan he organized the American Republican College League, the predecessor to the College Republicans. Petitioning then president, Republican William McKinley Burke won approval for the organization and hosted an inaugural banquet attended by McKinley along with 1,500 college students The organization quickly spread to almost every college in the country. In 1888, at age 21, Burke was made secretary of the committee in charge of the dedication of the then-new Allegheny County Court House, at which President Rutherford B. Hayes made the dedicating address.

== Legal career ==
After graduating from the University of Michigan, he was admitted to the Allegheny County bar the same year. Subsequently, he was admitted to the Superior and Supreme courts of Pennsylvania, and later to the United States Supreme Court, and commenced practice in Pittsburgh, Pennsylvania. He was the secretary of the Republican National Committee in 1892, resigning during the same year to devote his entire time to his duties as president of the American Republican College League.

== Political career ==
Burke ran for Congress in 1904 and was elected by a wide majority. He subsequently served five consecutive terms. He was chairman of the congressional committee which inaugurated William Howard Taft as the president of the United States.

During his time in Congress, Burke served on a number of committees, including:

- Committee on Education – Chairman
- Committee on Military Affairs
- Committee on Banking and Currency

He had a hand in a number of important pieces of legislation, including taking an active role in framing the Federal Reserve Act which created the Federal Reserve Bank, America's central bank.

In 1905, he was appointed a delegate to the Parliamentary Peace Conference in Brussels in 1905. He was appointed by President Benjamin Harrison to codify the navigation laws of the United States. He was officer of, or a delegate to, the Republican National Conventions from 1892 to 1924, with the exception of the year 1912.

== Post-Congress career ==
He was not a candidate for renomination in 1914. In December, 1917, he became United States Government Director of War Savings during World War I.

Following his political career, Burke resumed the practice of law, practicing for 10 years as a criminal lawyer at the Allegheny county bar. He was elected General Counsel of the Republican National Committee in December 1927 and served until his death. He was parliamentarian of the Republican National Convention at Kansas City, Missouri, in 1928.

Burke wrote a number of treatises, including "The Powers of the President", investigating the role of the president during wartime, and a history of the World Peace Conference entitled "Perplexing Problems of the World's Peace Conference".

== Personal ==
Burke was an avid golfer and belonged to a number of golf and country clubs. He was founder of the Beaumaris Yacht Club, in Beaumaris, Ontario, where he had a summer house. He may also have been a member of the very exclusive Bath and Tennis Club in Palm Beach, Fl. At one point the United States Golf Association asked him to prepare a set of rules which was ultimately presented to the international committee at St. Andrews in Scotland.

In 1895, Burke married Josephine Birch Scott of Detroit, Michigan, and had two children, James Scott Burke and Josephine Frances Burke. He died in Washington, D.C., and is buried in the Roman Catholic Calvary Cemetery, Pittsburgh, Pennsylvania.

== Sources ==
- United States Congress. "James F. Burke (id: B001093)". Biographical Directory of the United States Congress.

Pittsburgh Press, Feb 17, 1929, Rep Burke hosted luncheon for Pres-Elect Hoover at the Bath and Tennis Club

U.S. House of Representatives
Preceded by Henry K. Porter	Member of the U.S. House of Representatives from Pennsylvania's 31st congressional district 1905–1915	Succeeded by John M. Morin
