= James Mackie =

James Mackie may refer to:

- James Stuart Mackie (1860–1949), Canadian businessman and politician
- Jamie Mackie (born 1985), English born footballer
- Jamie Mackie (academic) (1924–2011), Australian political scientist and SE Asian specialist
- Jim Mackie (1889–1917), Australian rules footballer
- James Mackie (EastEnders), fictional character
- James Mackie (MP) (1821–1867), British member of parliament for Kirkcudbright
- James Mackie (moderator), Church of Scotland minister and historian
- James Mackie (died 1744), commander of the Royal Navy fire-ship HMS Anne Galley, 1742–1744

== See also ==
- James Mackey (disambiguation)
- James McKay (disambiguation)
- James McKie (disambiguation)
