= James McKie (publisher) =

Scottish publisher

James M'Kie
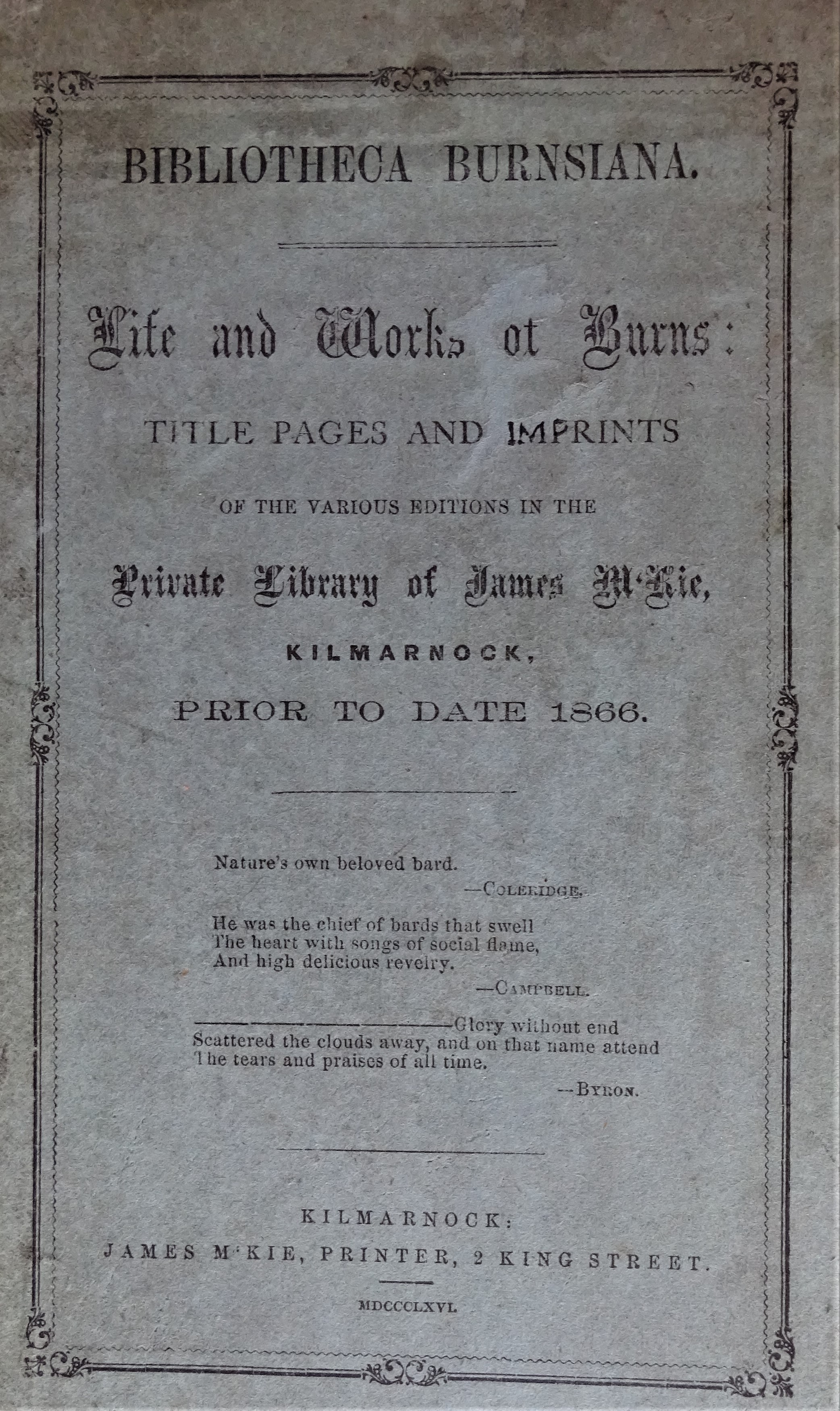
- Mckie's 'Bibliotheca Burnsiana'
- Born: 7 October 1816; Kilmarnock
- Died: 26 September 1891; Kilmarnock
- Occupations: Printer, Publisher, Bookbinder and Bookseller

James M'Kie or James McKie (1816–1891) was an apprentice of Hugh Crawford, John Wilson's successor at the Kilmarnock Cross printing business. In 1867, M'Kie published the first facsimile edition of the 1786 "Kilmarnock Edition" or Poems, Chiefly in the Scottish Dialect as well as various bibliographies, reprints, special editions, limited editions, etc. of Robert Burns' and other works for the Scottish, British, British Empire or North American markets. He became an avid collector of Burnsiana and put together the largest collection of published in the world at the time, that was eventually purchased by the local Kilmarnock Corporation and housed in the Kay Park Burns Museum.

== Life and character ==
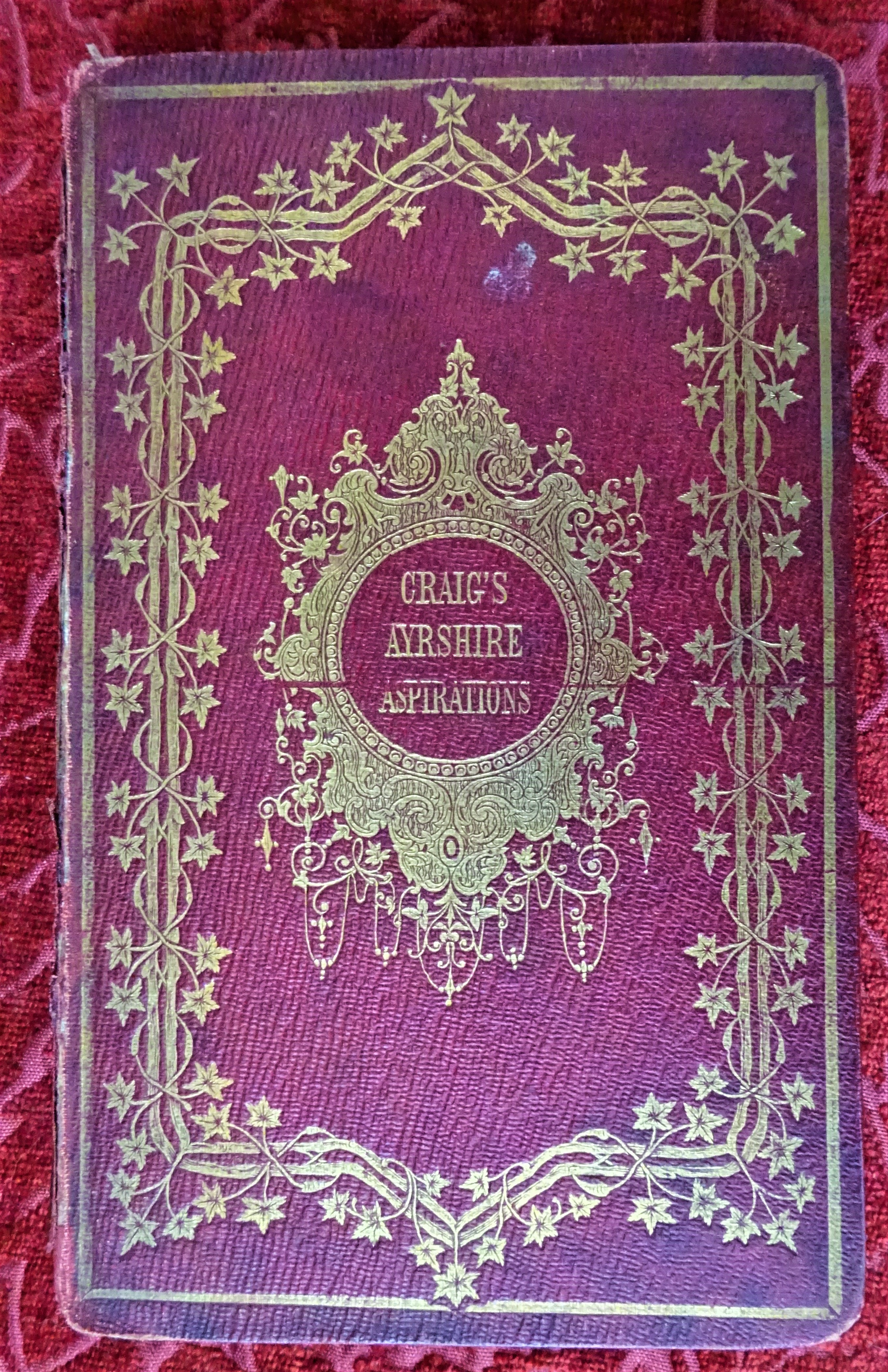
Hugh Craig's 'Ayrshire Aspirations' published by James M'Kie

M'Kie was born at Kilmarnock, East Ayrshire, on 7 October 1816, reportedly the illegitimate son of James M'Kie, a carpet weaver and Elizabeth Boyd, later married as Elizabeth Brown. At the age of 11 in 1828 he became an apprentice bookbinder at the Kilmarnock Cross premises of John Wilson's successor, Hugh Crawford. Crawford had been an apprentice to John Wilson. The apprenticeship lasted seven years, with a 6am to 8pm day, acquiring knowledge of bookbinding, counter-work and printing.

The local historian Archibald Mackay noted that the Kilmarnock Cross premises of John Wilson had belonged to Burns's supporter, John Goldie, who together with other local worthies had helped him publish his poems in the 'Kilmarnock Edition'.

In 1835 he moved to Elgin for six months, having finished his apprenticeship. In 1839 he obtained a job at a booksellers in Saltcoats and published a weekly periodical, the 'Ayrshire Inspirer,' containing work by local poets, writers, etc. His Kilmarnock friends persuaded him to publish an annual work, entitled the 'Ayrshire Wreath' based on the same idea of contributions as the 'Ayrshire Inspirer', and this was published on and off until 1855, partly due to the death of Hugh Crawford.

M'Kie married a widow, Agnes Jane Crawford on 8 March 1844. Agnes was the widow of a Dr. Drennan and the couple had three daughters.

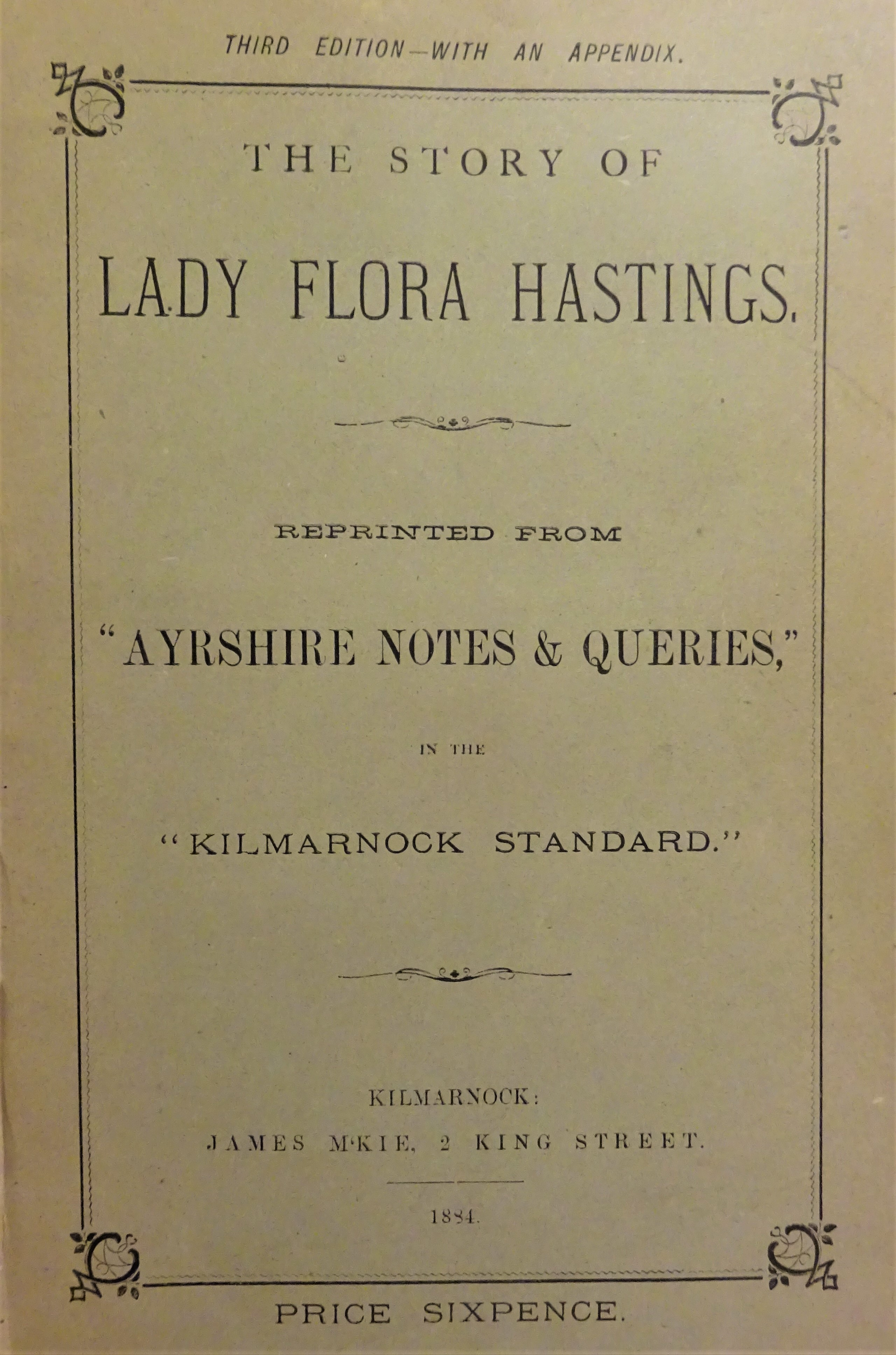
The Story of Lady Flora Hastings. Published by James McKie

He took over the printing business of Hugh Crawford & Son in Kilmarnock in 1845 which had previously moved to No.2, King Street from the Cross and later expanded to No.6 as well. He published a wide variety of pamphlets and books. Poetry, school textbooks, programmes for the ordination of clergy, a guide to the Crystal Palace exhibition, and Archibald MacKay's popular 'History of Kilmarnock,' the story of Lady Flora Hasting's were amongst the works. In 1847 he opened a branch in Dalry, eventually taken over by David Brown, his half-brother. James M'Kie's step-son became a partner in 1874 and the firm was renamed 'M'Kie & Drennan, Printers', a partnership that ceased in 1879.

Robert Irvine the bookseller and James M'Kie were good friends and both were described as of "irascible temperament, but were at heart 'tender as men, and gentle as women."

M'Kie was a member of the Kilmarnock Literary Society and the Ayr and Wigton Archaeological Association. He had an interest in Burns from an early age but circa 1843 he began to actively collect different editions of Robert Burns' works, etc. The collection developed an international reputation and attracted many visitors and his obituary records that his visitors were 'always assured of a hearty and hospitable welcome.'

The Burns Club of Kilmarnock approached M'Kie in 1882 to discuss buying his collection. The necessary funds were raised by public donations and the then Corporation of Kilmarnock placed the collection in the Burns Monument Museum in the Kay Park that they had purchased.

James M'Kie died on 26 September 1891, aged 75, five years after retiring. His home and library extension in Kings Street have been demolished. D.Brown & Co. took over the business of James M'kie at 2 and 6 King Street.

== M'kie, M'Kie & Drennan & D. Brown & Co. ==
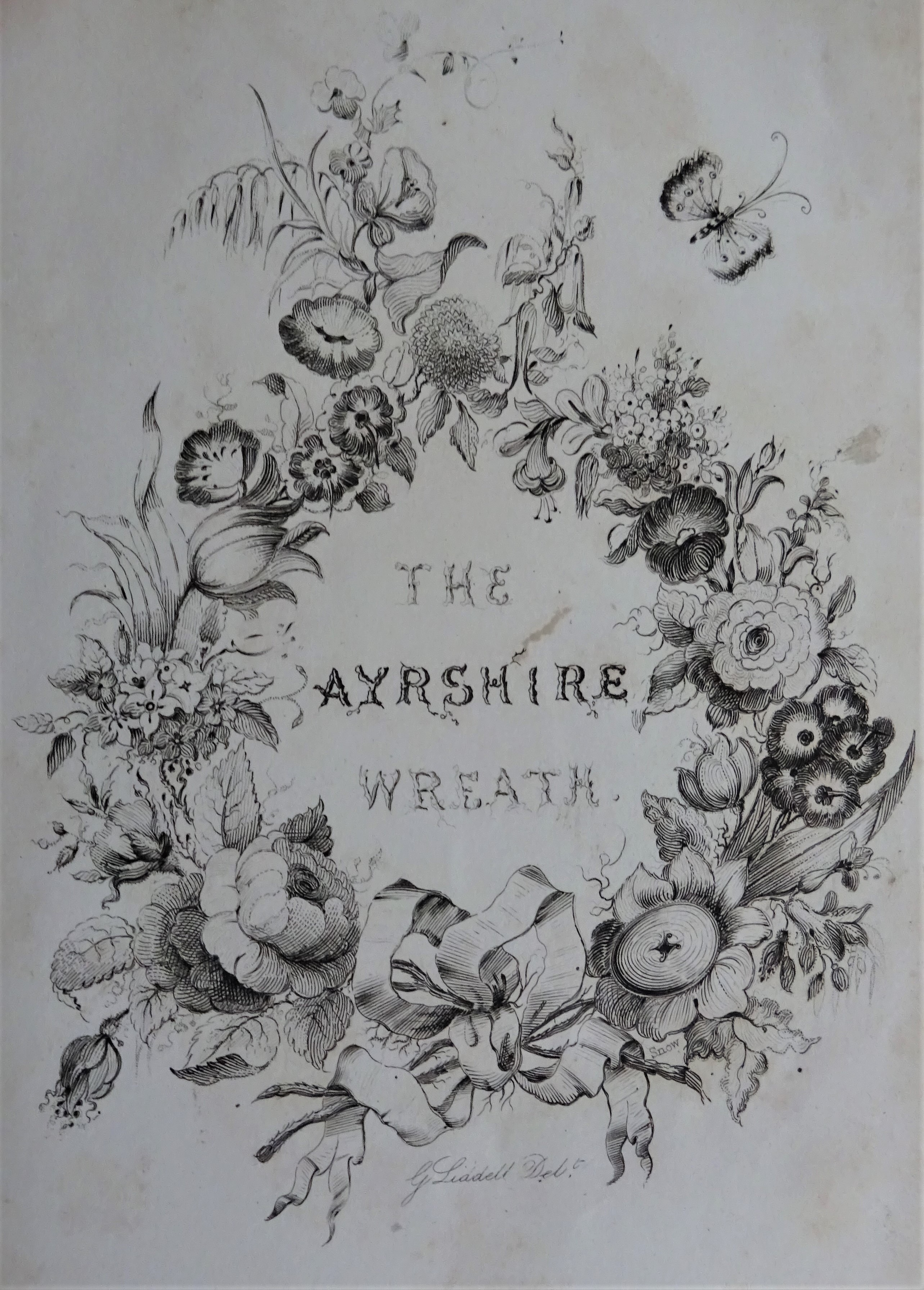
The Ayrshire Wreath. Edited and Published by James M'Kie.

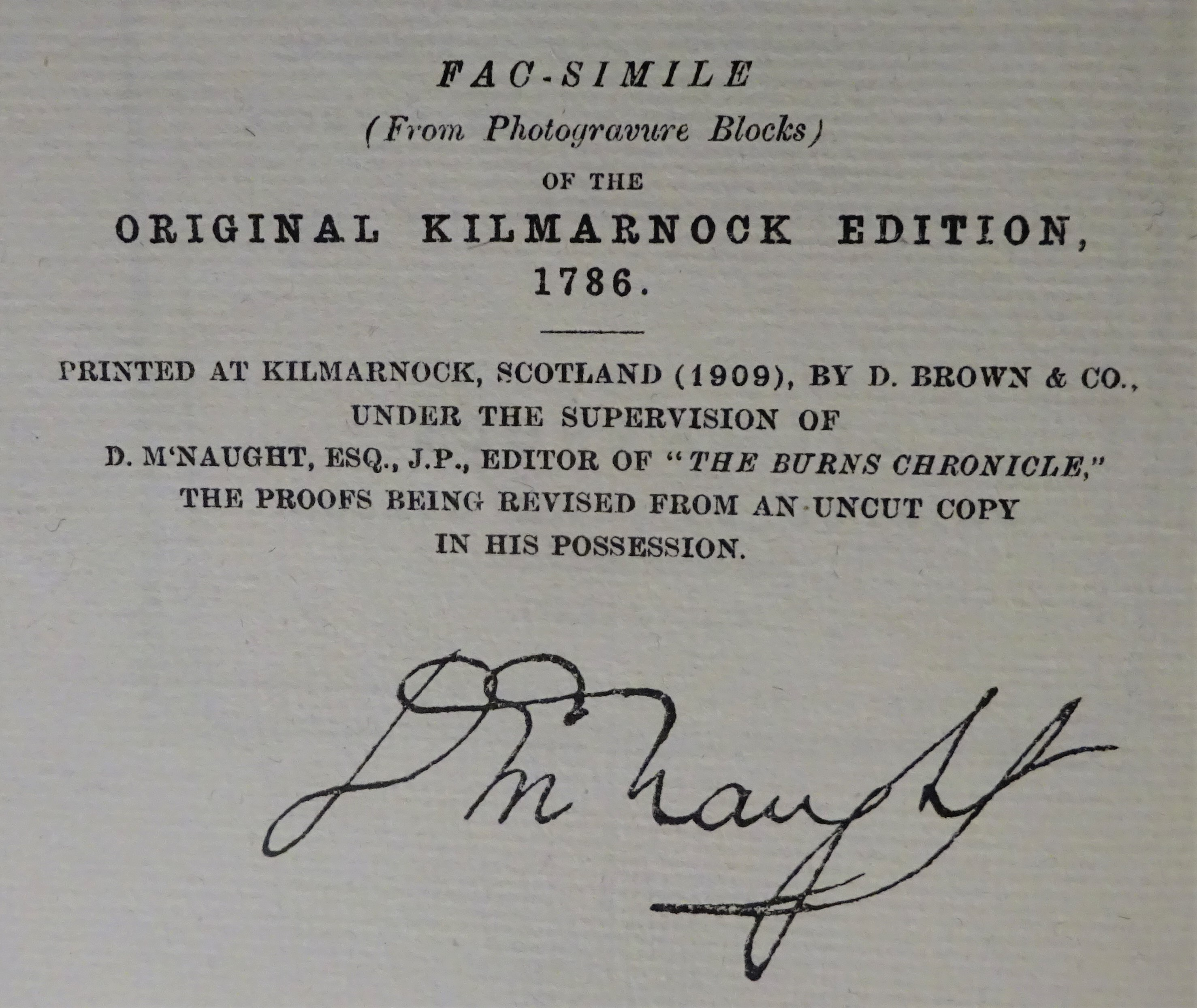
The D.Brown & Co. 1909 Facsimile as signed by Duncan McNaught.

In addition to the many other works, the companies produced facsimile editions of the 1786 Kilmarnock Edition or Poems, Chiefly in the Scottish Dialect, special editions, limited editions, reprints of Burns poems and songs, bibliographies, etc.

=== Burns Publications ===
M'Kie published works from 1866 to 1886, for the British, British Empire and North American markets.

- 1867, 1869, 1870: Poems, Chiefly in the Scottish Dialect, by Robert Burns. Kilmarnock : printed by John Wilson. MDCCLXXXVI. A facsimile. In 1870 the first American and Canadian editions were also published. Small numbers of volumes were issued on large paper.
- 1869: Songs, Chiefly in the Scottish Dialect. By Robert Burns. MDCCCLXIX. McKie claimed that he had achieved a complete collection of the poet's songs.
- 1871: Kilmarnock Popular Edition. The complete poetical Works of Robert Burns. Arranged in the Order of their earliest publication. Edited by William Scott Douglas.
- 1874: 'Burns and His Kilmarnock Friends, with other pieces in Prose and Verse. Printed for Archibald McKay.
- 1875: 'A Manual of Religious Belief with Biographical Preface'. The first published edition of William Burnes 'Manual' in a limited edition of 600 copies. The 'Preface' seems to have been written by James McKie. Printed and published by McKie and Drennan.
- 1876, 1886, 1887, 1890, 1891, 1893, 1896, 1903, 1923, etc. : The Complete poetical works of Robert Burns. A number of title variations such as 'Centenary Edition'.
- 1877: 'The People's Edition. Poems, Chiefly in the Scottish Dialect, by Robert Burns'.
- 1881: 'The Bibliography of Robert Burns with Biographical and Bibliographical Notes and Sketches of Burns Clubs, Monuments and Statues'.
- 1886: Poems, Chiefly in the Scottish Dialect, by Robert Burns. Centenary facsimile. 120 copies.

Publications included his own works:

- M'Kie, James (1886). Bibliotheca Burnsiana. Life and Works of Burns ... in the Private Library of James McKie. Kilmarnock : James M'Kie.
- M'Kie, James (1874). The Burns Calendar: A Manual of Burnsiana .. A Concise Bibliography and A Record of Burns Relics. Kilmarnock : James M'Kie. The 600 copies of the 'Burns Calendars' were sold out before publication.

== The Kilmarnock Edition facsimiles ==
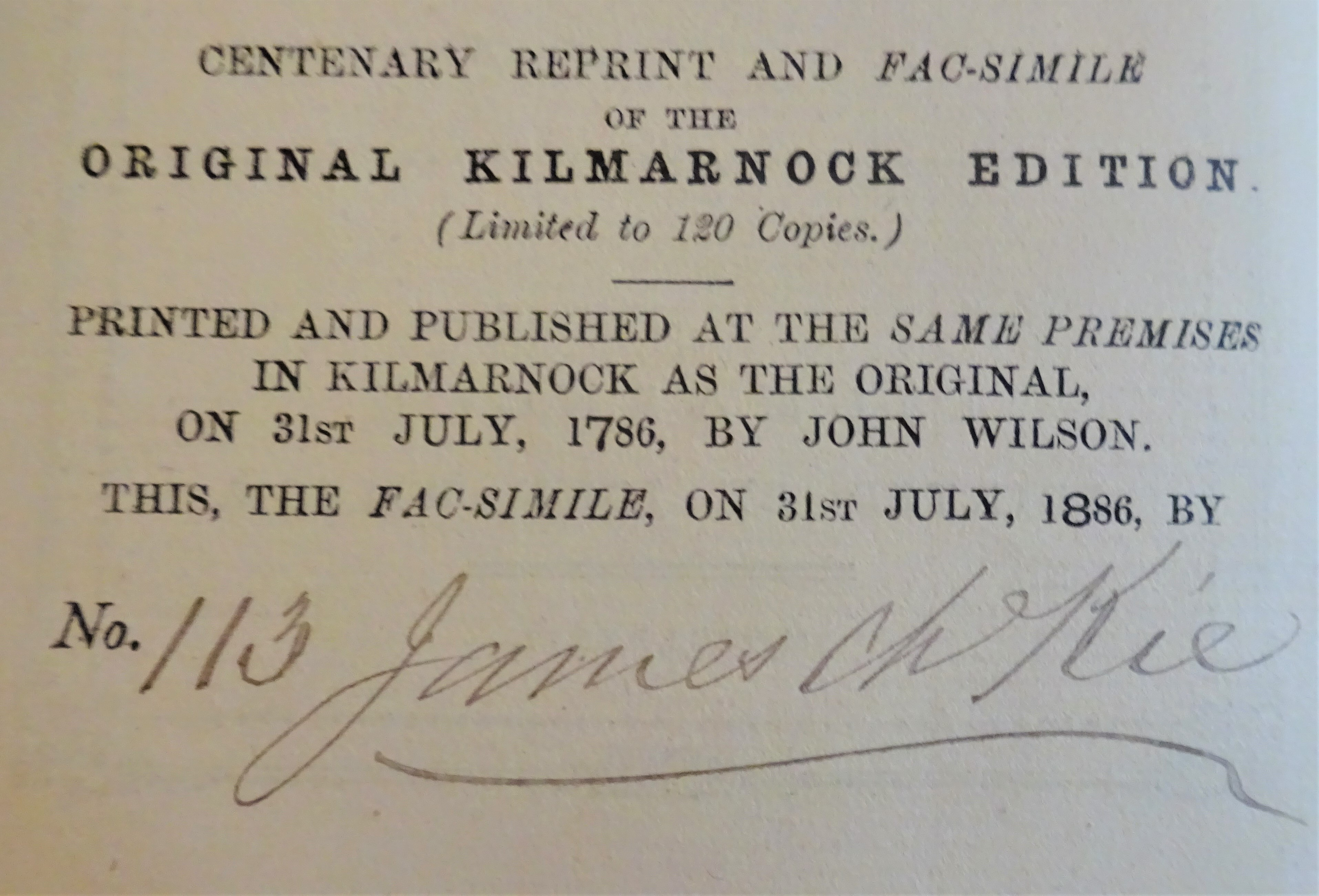
Centenary Facsimile with Jamies McKie's signature in a limited edition of 120 copies.

Only 612 copies of the Poems, Chiefly in the Scottish Dialect were printed by John Wilson in 1786 and M'Kie saw that most collectors of Robert Burns's works would be unable to acquire a copy and to satisfy this demand and satisfy his own interests as an admirer of Burns he produced the first facsimile edition for collectors in 1867 in a print run of 600 copies. These facsimiles were in original style boards, signed by James McKie. A large paper issue of 28 cm was also printed in a limited edition of 50, also signed by James McKie. This publication was widely praised and highly regarded, and all the copies were sold by subscription prior to being printed.

At least sixteen editions with variants were published between 1866 and 1886, including an edition limited to 120 copies in 1886 with a vellum spine and blue boards, with James McKie's signature on the title verso. The first American Edition was published in 1868.

Only 88 copies of the Kilmarnock Edition are known to have survived.

=== The McKie Collection ===
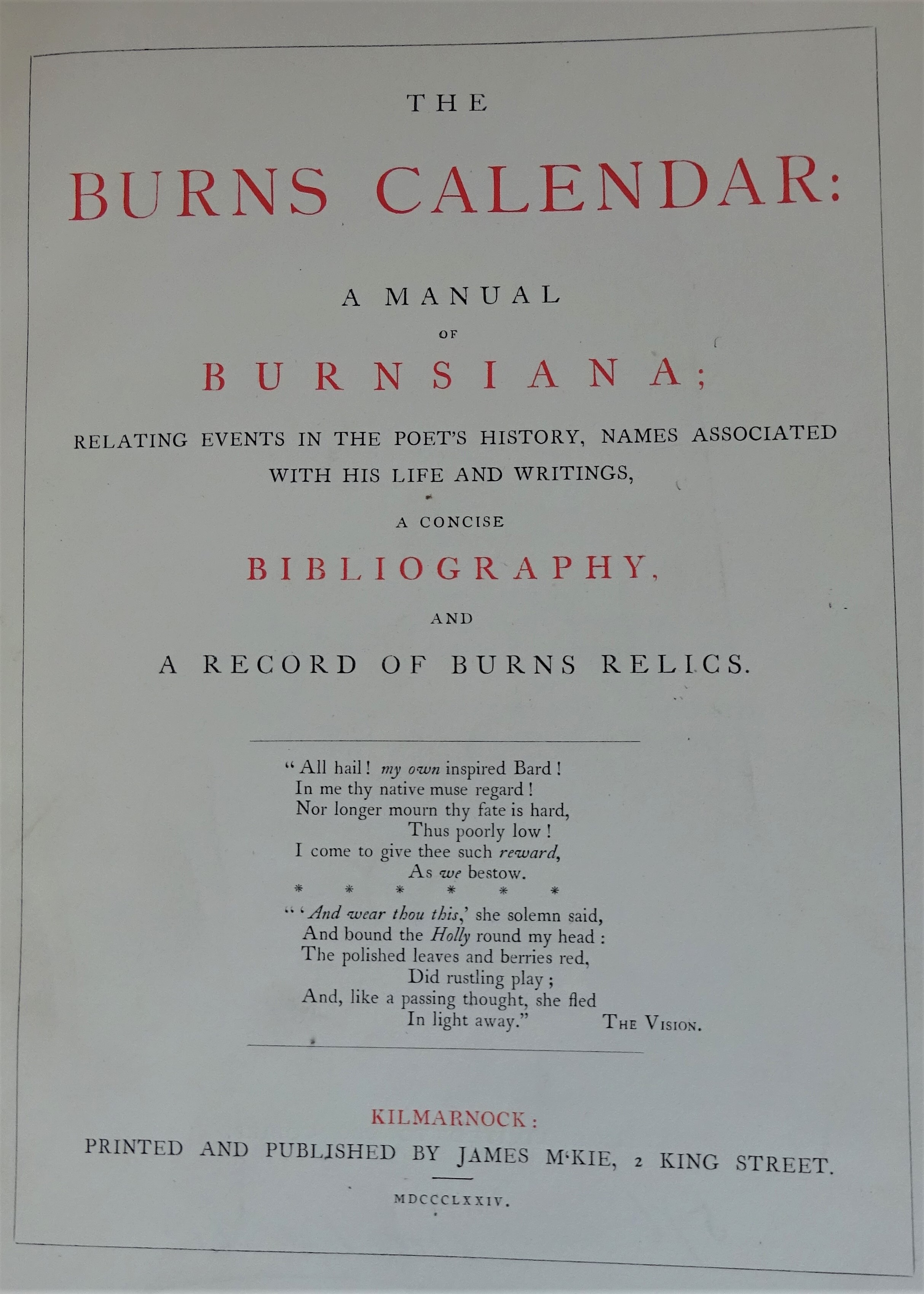
McKie's Burns Calendar, Bibliography and List of Relics.

M'Kie's collection of Burns books, paintings, manuscripts and general Burnsiana grew to become the world's largest collections of its kind of the bard's works at the time, with between 600 and 700 volumes, housed in a special extension built in 1870 known as the 'Ayrshire Burns Library' adjoining his home in Kilmarnock, 'Alpha House' in Kings Street. As stated, the town corporation purchased the 'M'Kie Collection' and it was displayed in the Burns Monument Museum in the 1880s, the construction of which McKie had been largely instrumental in establishing in 1879. A 'M'Kie Room' was once located in the towns library and museum, the Dick Institute. Following a fire at the Burns Monument Museum it is now housed by East Ayrshire Council Arts and Museums Service but only parts of it are viewable and these are an online source.

David Sneddon prepared a catalogue of M'Kie's collection which runs to 160 pages with over 1300 items, including 400 editions of the poet's works.

In addition to these items M'Kie had a small collection of Robert Burns and Burns family artifacts: A rush-bottomed Chair and a Dram Glass that had belonged to Burns; an odd volume of the Spectator that had belonged to his father William Burnes and carried his autograph; a holograph copy of The Whistle : A Ballad on foolscap paper with the official Excise stamp. It had an extra stanza addressed to "Mr.Cairns, Jun., Torr, Dumfries":

But one sorry quill, and that worn to the core;
No paper, but such as I shew it:
But such as it is, will the good Laird of Torr
Accept, and excuse the poor poet?

By the late 19th century the Burns collection of the Burnsian and Kilmaurs schoolmaster Duncan McNaught had surpassed that of James M'kie, however it was lost to Scotland in 1920 when the American businessman and antiquarian collector John Gribbel purchased his collection and took it back with him to America where it was sadly dispersed after his death in 1936.
