= James McKie (footballer, born 1873) =

Scottish footballer

Personal information
- Full name: James McKie (born John McCoy)
- Date of birth: 3 April 1873
- Place of birth: Dalry, Ayrshire, Scotland
- Position: Full-back

Youth career
- 15th Company Royal Artillery

Senior career*
Years	Team	Apps	(Gls)
18??–1896	Freemantle		
1896–1897	Southampton St. Mary's	6	(0)
1897–1899	Chatham		
1899–19??	Dartford		
- * Club domestic league appearances and goals

James McKie was a Scottish footballer who played as a full-back for Southampton St. Mary's in 1896–97, when they won the Southern League title for the first of six occasions over the next eight years.

== Football career ==
McKie was born in Dalry, a small town in Ayrshire, Scotland and had served in the 15th Company Royal Artillery. He had been a member of the Freemantle football team before being signed by Southampton St. Mary's in the summer of 1896.

He made his debut for the "Saints" at the County Ground in the opening match of the 1896–97 season, a 4–1 victory over Chatham. He played at left-back with his fellow Scotsmen Donald McKay at right-back and William McMillan at right-half. McKay retained his place for a further two games, before being replaced by Samuel Meston, who had moved back to accommodate Willie Naughton on the right wing. McKie had a further run of three matches, when he took over from McKay in December and January. Described as "tough and rugged", McKie also played in six of the seven FA Cup matches in which the "Saints" reached the Second round proper for the first time, going out to Newton Heath after a replay.

The Saints won the first nine games of the season and finished unbeaten in the league after twenty matches, thus claiming the Southern League title for the first time.

In the summer of 1897, McKie moved to Kent with spells for fellow Southern League teams Chatham and Dartford.

== Honours ==
Southampton St. Mary's

- Southern League champions: 1896–97
