= James McKay (industrialist) =

Irish-American industrialist (1830–1906)

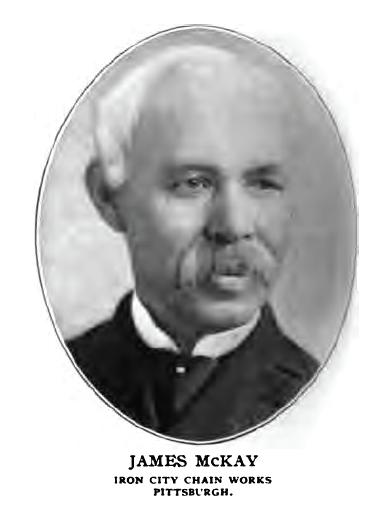
- Born: 15 December 1830; Ireland
- Died: 29 April 1906 (aged 75); Pittsburgh, Pennsylvania, US
- Occupation: Industrialist
- Spouse: Anna Eliza Watson
- Children: 9

James McKay (1830–1906) was an Irish-born American industrialist in Pittsburgh, Pennsylvania. The founder and owner of James McKay & Co of Pittsburgh, a manufacturer of metal chains, he was also active in oil and gas development, with one of the earliest producing properties in Pennsylvania. In addition, he was part owner of one of the largest silver mines in the state of Colorado.

== Early career ==
James McKay was born in Ireland in 1830, and he was the first of his family to come to the shores of the United States. He arrived there in 1848, and for a short time made his home in Philadelphia, Pennsylvania. The year after his arrival, he moved to Pittsburgh. He found employment with Robert Watson, the owner of a wholesale grocery house. Later, he succeeded Watson in this business and organized the firm of McKay & Philips. After a while, he purchased the interest of Philips and formed the firm of McKay & Brothers, who carried on this business very successfully.

== Oil Interests ==
Mr. McKay became identified with the oil industry in 1876, and took a small interest in a company which was formed in Pittsburgh, and which had a lease on some oil fields in Butler county, known as the "Jenkins" oil farm. Before oil was struck Mr. McKay bought out the interests of all the others concerned in this company, and shortly afterwards was successful in making a decided oil strike. This produced about three thousand dollars per day, but owing to the inadequate facilities of the time and the incompetency in handling the outflow, the greater part of this was lost. Mr. McKay, continued in this field for a number of years, and finally disposed of his interests in 1895.

== Mining Interests ==
He then, in conjunction with W. J. Hammond, purchased in Colorado what was known as the Yankee Girl Silver Mine, which was one of the largest mines ever worked in that region of Colorado. It contained rich deposits, and Mr. McKay continued in gold and silver mining until his death.

== James McKay & Co ==
The firm of McKay and Hammond was located at the corner of Twenty-ninth and Liberty streets, where they were engaged in the manufacture of chains. Mr. McKay purchased all the interests of his partners in 1887 and organized the firm of James McKay & Company, taking into partnership his two sons, Robert J. and J. Albert. The firm was changed to a stock company in 1905, and Mr. McKay retired, turning over all his interests to his three sons, the two mentioned above and Thomas J. The plant was located at McKee's Rocks, Pennsylvania, and was eventually sold in the 1960s to Teledyne Corporation.

== Other Business Interests ==
He was the vice-president of the Duquesne National Bank of Pittsburgh for many years, and held this office at the time of his death. He was an extensive property owner in Pittsburgh, as well as in West Virginia, Kentucky, Colorado, Idaho, New Mexico, Arizona and California.

== Marriage and children ==
McKay married Anna Eliza Watson, daughter of Robert and Eliza (Stewart) Watson, and granddaughter of the Rev. Robert Stewart, a Methodist minister of Ireland. Robert Watson and his wife were both natives of Ireland, where they were married, and they came to the U.S. in 1829 or 1830. They made their first home in Kentucky, going there on a barge along the Ohio River. In Kentucky, Robert Watson was a builder of flatboats. Upon coming to Pittsburgh, he became a contractor and builder of boats, but he later engaged in the grocery trade. Both he and his wife spent the remainder of their lives in Pittsburgh.

McKay and his wife were the parents of several children:

- Robert J. McKay
- Elizabeth McKay
- J. Albert McKay
- Anna E. McKay
- Thomas J. McKay
- Elizabeth P. McKay
- Edna M. McKay
- Carrie Isabel McKay
- Alice B. McKay

McKay died on April 30, 1906, and his wife died on July 15, 1929.

== Beaumaris ==
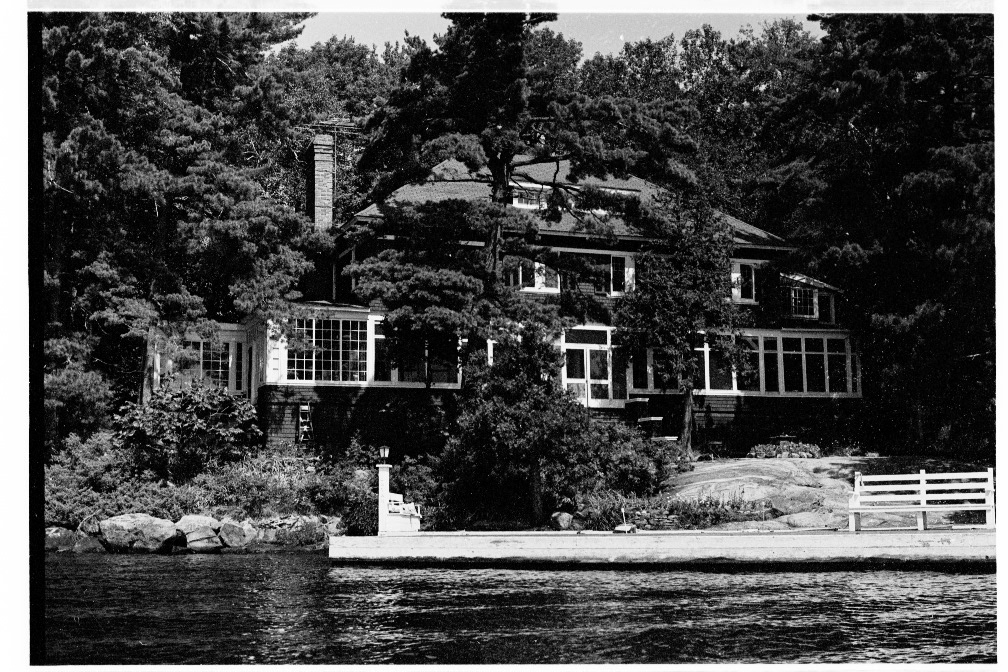
"Fairholm", summer residence of James McKay

During the 1880s, the McKays purchased an island near the then-newly settled resort area of Beaumaris on Lake Muskoka in Ontario. The island, named "Fairholm", was conceived as a family enclave for the summer, much like similar developments during this era in the Adirondack Mountains.

McKay eventually built four cottages on the island, which were shared by his children and passed down to their offspring. To this day, one of the cottages is still owned by McKay's descendants and are enjoyed by the seventh consecutive generation.

== Sources ==
- Boucher, John Newton (1908). A Century and a Half of Pittsburg and Her People. Pittsburgh: Lewis Publishing Company. pp. 305. "james mckay company."
