= Jim McKay (footballer) =

Scottish footballer

Personal information
- Full name: James McKay
- Date of birth: 11 June 1918
- Place of birth: Stirling, Scotland
- Date of death: 14 November 1986 (aged 68)
- Place of death: Denny, Scotland
- Position: Centre forward

Youth career
- Dunipace

Senior career*
Years	Team	Apps	(Gls)
1944–1945	Celtic		
1945–1946	Alloa Athletic		
1947–1948	Portadown		
1948–1949	Cowdenbeath		
1949–1950	Tranmere Rovers	12	(1)
Total		12	(1)
- * Club domestic league appearances and goals

James McKay (11 June 1918 – 14 November 1986) was a Scottish footballer who played as a centre forward.

McKay joined Celtic from the army in September 1944 during World War II after serving in Burma with The Cameronians. He made a scoring debut on 7 October as Celtic lost 3–2 to Rangers in the Glasgow Cup at Hampden Park. He played a total of three Regional League games for Celtic – scoring two goals – before asking to be released in March 1945. McKay later joined Alloa Athletic, and also went on to play for Portadown, Cowdenbeath and, in the 1949–50 season, Tranmere Rovers.
