= Beaumaris, Ontario =

- Community
- Interactive map of Beaumaris, Ontario
- Coordinates: 45°04′18″N 79°29′35″W
- Country: Canada
- Province: Ontario
- District: Muskoka
- Municipality: Muskoka Lakes
- Time zone: UTC-5 (EST)
  - Summer (DST): UTC-4 (EDT)
- Area code: 705

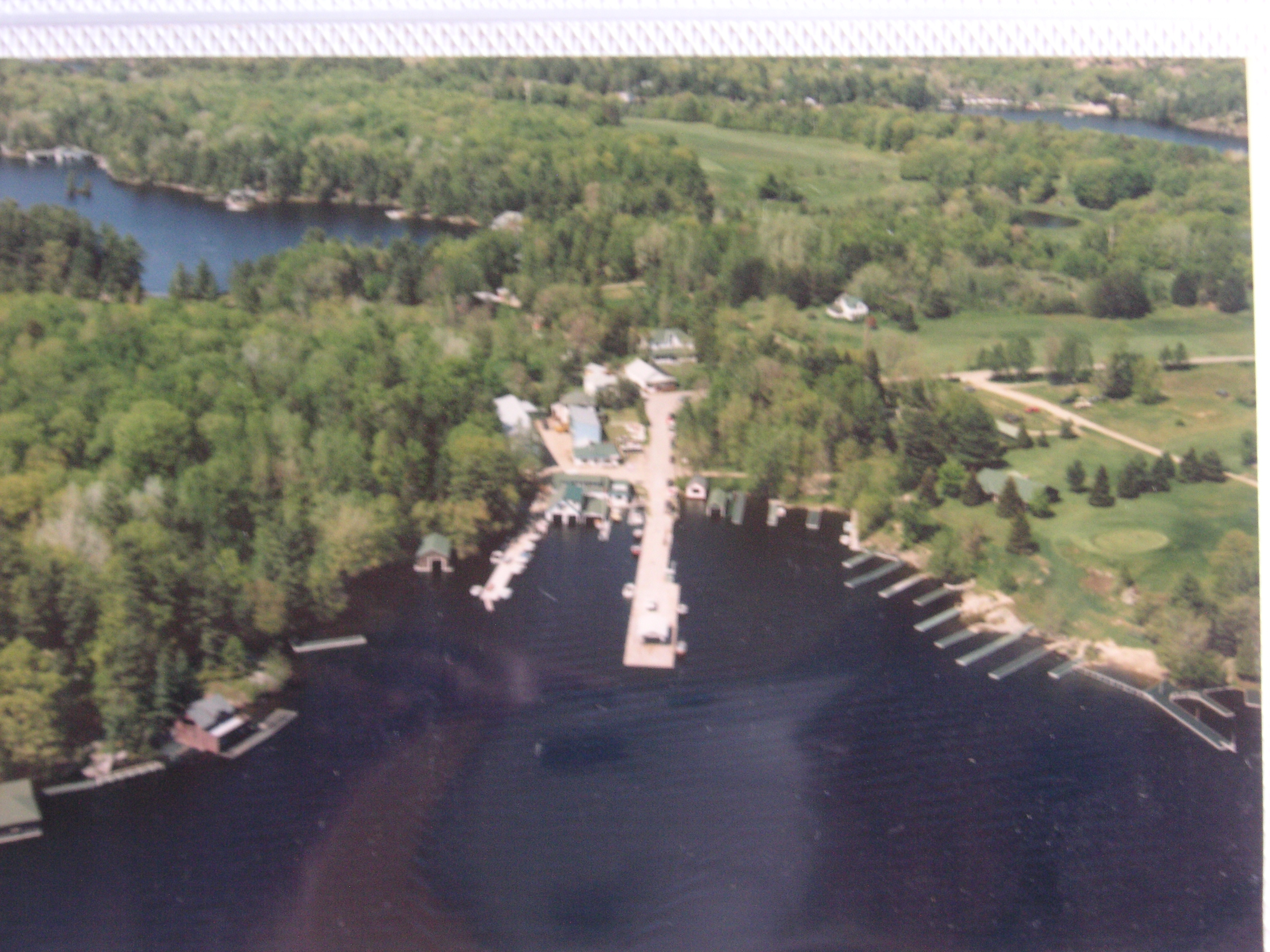
Beaumaris Ontario from the air circa 1968 with government dock in the centre with the marina at left and site of the former Beaumaris Hotel on the right

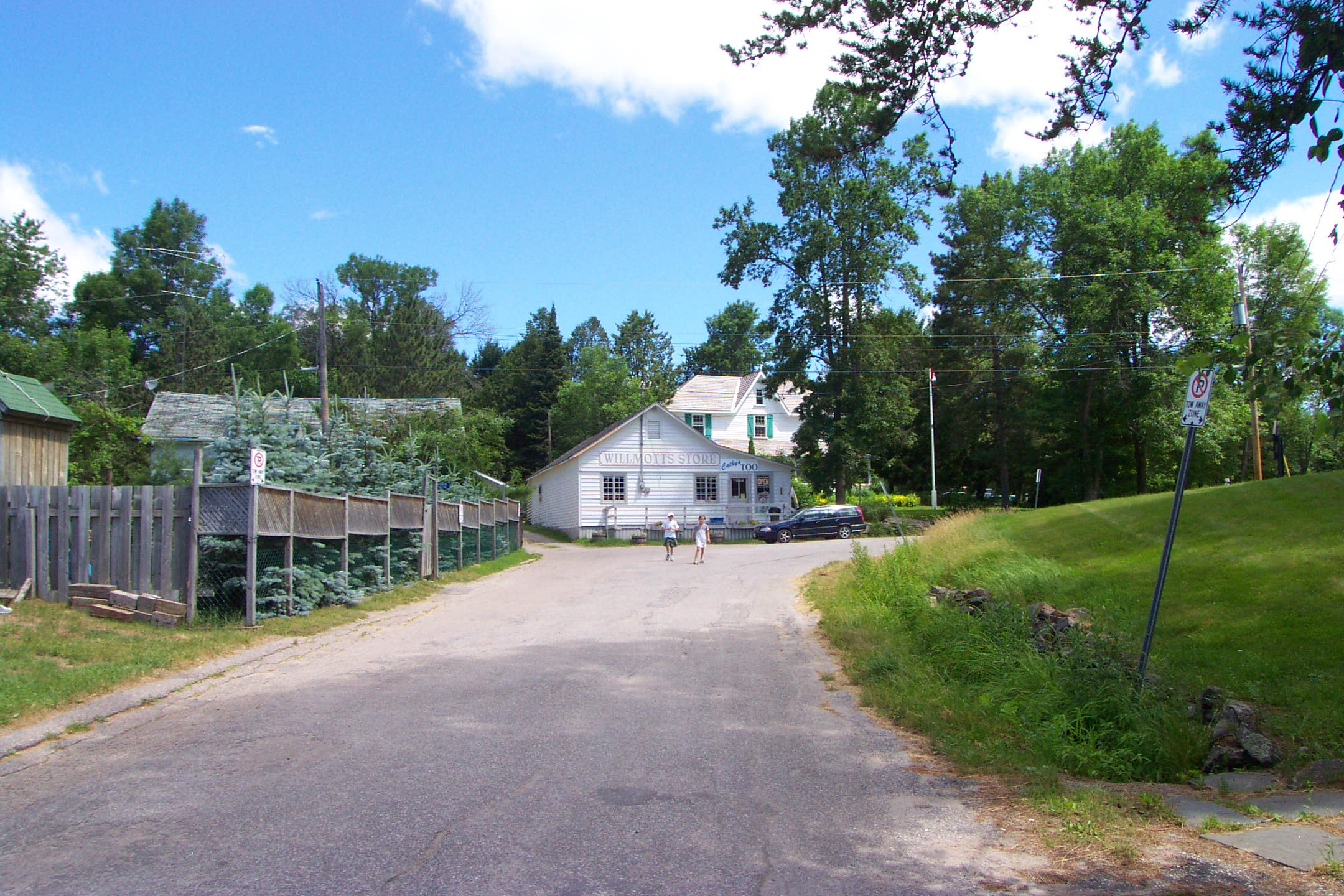
Beaumaris Ontario view looking up from the water toward the general store with the site of the former post office on the left

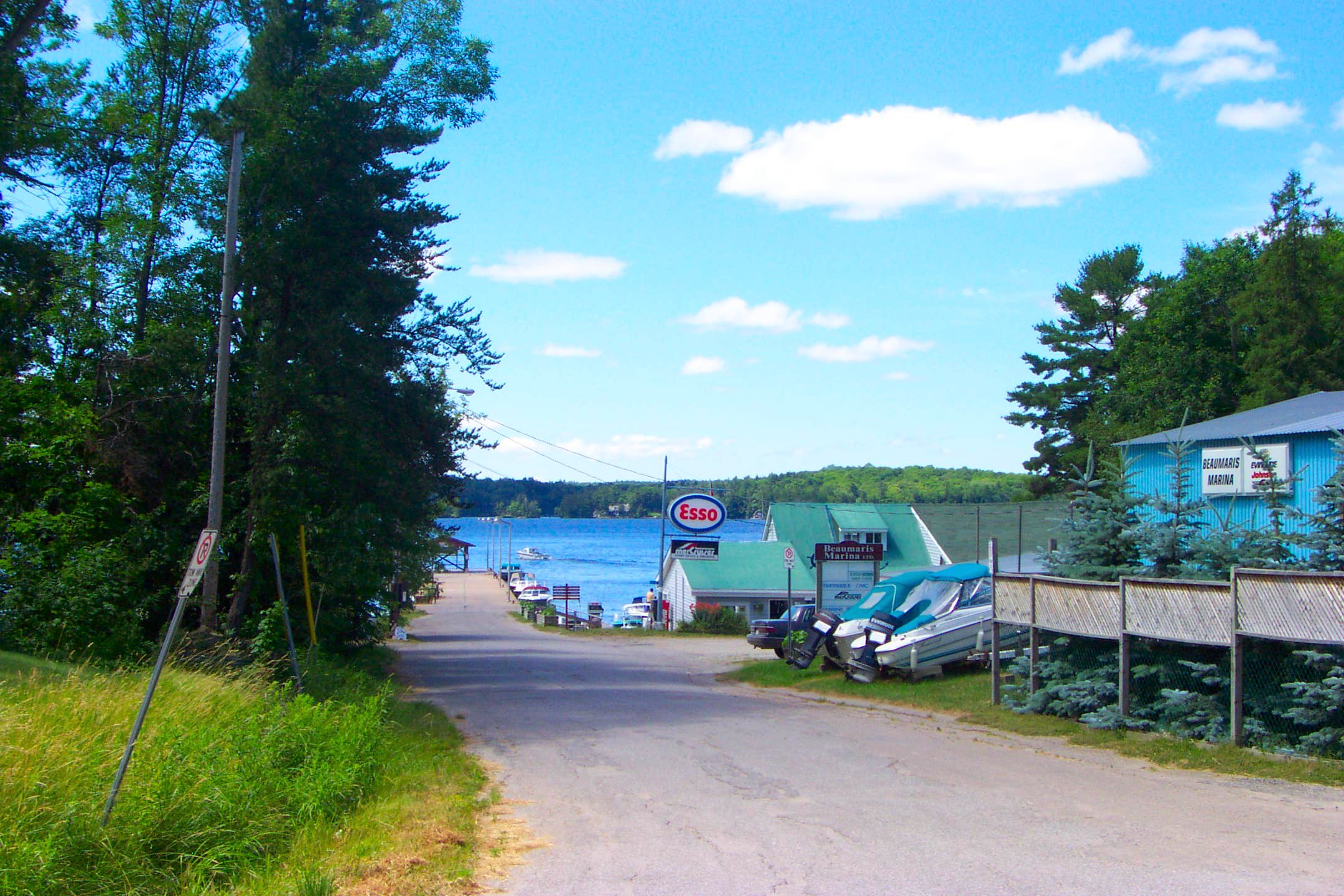
Beaumaris Ontario looking toward the government pier with the marina on the right

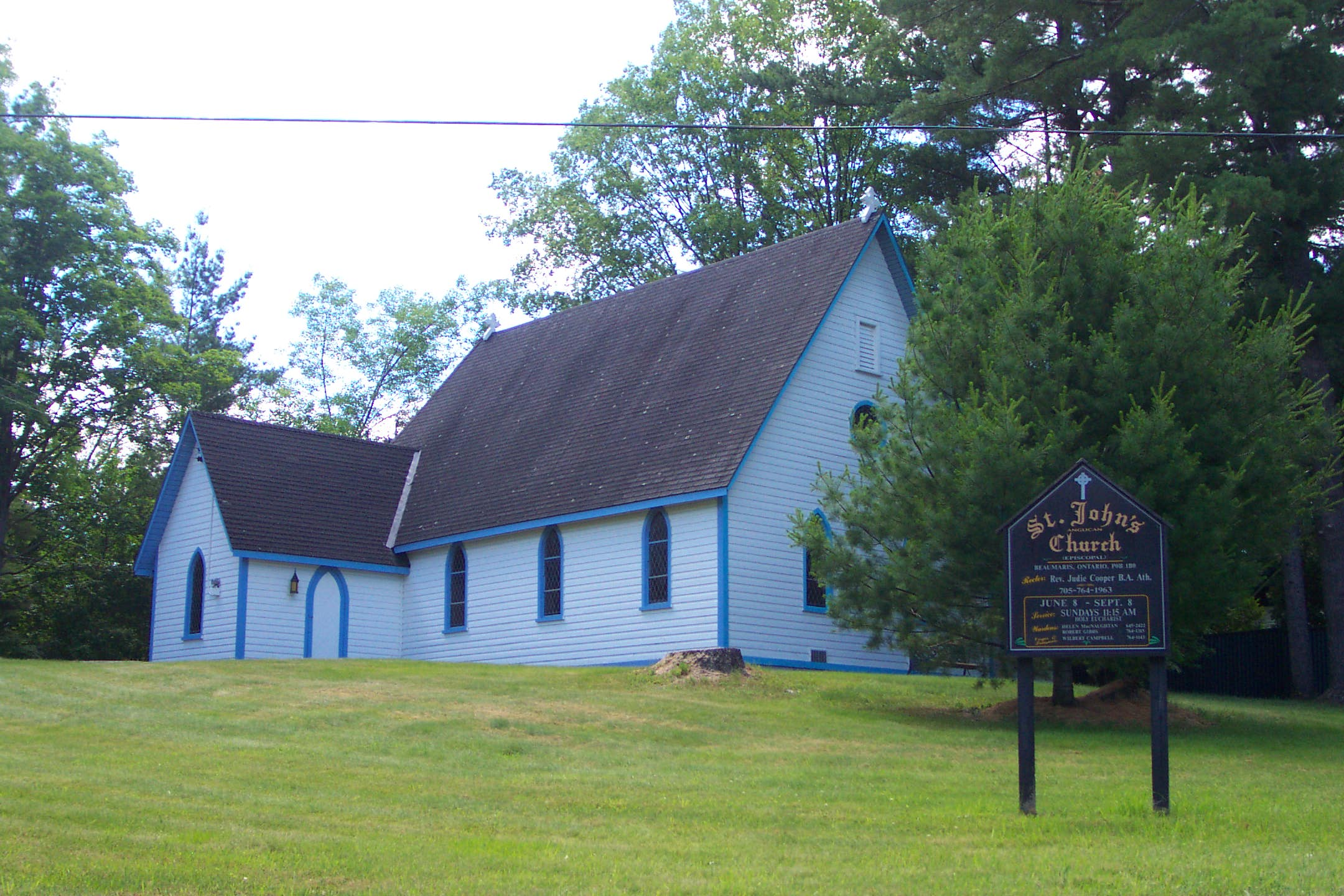
St. John's Anglican Church, Beaumaris Ontario

Beaumaris (/bjuːˈmærɪs/ bew-MAR-is) is a small settlement in Ontario, Canada, on Lake Muskoka which once served as an important transit point during the steamship era on the lake, and once hosted a summer hotel, called the Beaumaris Hotel. The settlement is located on Tondern Island which, though a true island, is attached to the mainland by a small bridge at Milford Bay. Currently the settlement sports a government pier, The Beaumaris Marina, a general store dubbed Willmotts Store after a prominent Beaumaris family, Saint John's Anglican Church, and a private summer club; the Beaumaris Yacht Club.

== History ==
=== First Nations ===
Geography drove history in the Muskoka region. Studded with lakes and abundant with rocks the land offered an abundance of fishing, hunting, and trapping, but was poorly suited to farming. Largely the land of the Ojibwa people, European inhabitants ignored it while settling the more promising area south of the Severn River. The Ojibwa leader associated with the area was Mesqua Ukie for whom the land was probably named. The tribe lived south of the region, near present-day Orillia and used Muskoka as their hunting grounds. Another Ojibwa tribe lived in the area of Port Carling which was called Obajewanung. The tribe moved to Parry Sound around 1866.

=== European arrival ===
Largely unsettled until the late 1760s the European presence in the region was largely limited to seasonal fur trapping, but no significant trading settlements were established. Canadian government interest increased following the American Revolution when, fearing invasion from its new neighbor to the south the government began exploring the region in hopes of finding travel lanes between Lake Ontario and Georgian Bay In 1826 Lieutenant Henry Briscoe became the first white man known to have crossed the middle of Muskoka. David Thompson drew the first maps of the area in 1837 and possibly camped near present-day Beaumaris.

Canada experienced heavy European immigration in the mid-19th century, especially from Ireland which experienced famine in the 1840s. As the land south of the Severn was settled, the government planned to open the Muskoka region further north to settlement. Logging licenses were issued in 1866 which opened Monck Township to logging. The lumber industry expanded rapidly denuding huge tracts of the area, but also prompting the development of road and water transportation. The railroad pushed north to support the industry, reaching Gravenhurst in 1875 and Bracebridge in 1885. Road transportation took the form of the Muskoka Colonization Road, begun in 1858 and reaching Bracebridge in 1861. The road was roughly hewn from the woods and was of corduroy construction, meaning logs were placed perpendicular to the route of travel to keep carriages from sinking in the mud and swamps. Needless to say this made for extremely rugged travel. The lumbering industry spawned a number of ancillary developments, including as mentioned, transport, but also settlements began springing up to supply the workers and Bracebridge, (formerly North Falls) saw some leather tanning businesses develop. Tanners used the bark from lumber to tan hides thereby using what otherwise would be a waste product.

=== Purchase of Tondern Island ===
The passages of the Free Grants and Homestead Act of 1868 brought opened the era of widespread settlement to Muskoka. This was the year an Irish immigrant from Enniskillen named Paul Dane purchased Tondern Island for $101 from the crown. The island comprises 338 acres (1.37 km^{2}) and is the home of present-day Beaumaris. Dane named the island after the Battle of Tondern between the Prussians and Denmark. Ownership of the island passed to Dane's nephew Maurice John McCarthy when Dane died in 1871. The only structure on the island at that time was a log house known as the "big white house" on the site of the future Beaumaris Hotel (now the Beaumaris Golf Club).

=== Founding of Beaumaris ===
In 1873 McCarthy sold the island to Edward Prowse and John Harry Willmott for $1,560. The two divided the island in half with Willmott taking the northern and Prowse the southern half. The new owners named the settlement Beaumaris after the resort in Anglesey, Wales where they had vacationed. Prowse settled in the big white house while Willmott built a log house next to the site of the present day Willmott store. They cleared part of the land for pasture, built a dock for the newly arrived steamships and connected the island to the mainland by a small log bridge.

As word of the excellent fishing, natural beauty, and an air completely free of ragweed providing relief for hay fever sufferers spread, tourists came to the area. Willmott responded by building a general store in Beaumaris selling everything from foodstuffs to construction materials. Early tourists built camps around the lake, but were joined by others desiring better accommodations. The first wilderness hotel was built at the head of Lake Rosseau in 1870, called Rosseau House. It was owned by New Yorker W.H. Pratt. Prowse saw success with his hotel due to Beaumaris' central location, approximately halfway between Bracebridge and Port Carling and the fine pier he had constructed near the hotel. Trains regularly made the run from Toronto to Gravenhurst where travelers and their luggage were transferred to the great steamers of the Muskoka Navigation Co such as the Sagamo. Making regular stops up the lakes, including Bracebridge, Beaumaris, and Port Carling, tourists there could transfer to smaller ships such as the Islander which could reach into smaller ports. Beaumaris became an important transfer point which brought business to the hotel and store. As the area developed it began to lose some of the wilderness qualities which initially led some of the early groups of campers to establish fishing camps in Beaumaris; Solid Comfort Camp and the Sharon Social Fishing Club. The Sharon Social Fishing Club was founded in 1891 by individuals living in Sharon, Pennsylvania, U.S.A. It is still in existence. Members of the Solid Comfort Camp departed for a more rustic site on the French River. Meanwhile, Willmott and Prowse mapped out lots which they intended to sell to vacationers seeking more permanent residence than the hotel.

=== Beaumaris Hotel ===
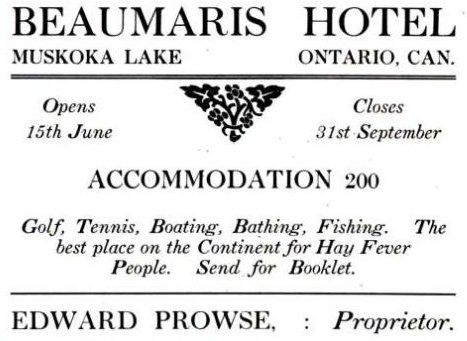
Advertisement for the Beaumaris Hotel circa 1905

The hotels became the centres of vacationers' lives which could stretch for weeks or even months in the summer. As families became seasonally established, they began building cottages near the hotels; at first simple affairs replicating the rustic environment of the early camps, but later grander including in some cases housing for significant staff. Initially cottagers relied on rowboats and canoes for daily transport and would sometimes row substantial distances. Eventually the era of the steam and gasoline launch came and people relied less on muscle power and more on motors. With the boats came the boathouses, often elaborate structures in their own right mimicking in many cases the look and feel of the main cottage. The Beaumaris Hotel enjoyed a commanding view of the lake and grew to accommodate 200 guests. It was 120 feet (37 m) long, 3 stories high, and had a 100-foot (30 m) wing. A 220-foot (67 m) verandah surrounded the structure providing a comfortable place for guests to relax. The hotel offered a full program of entertainment, including live music and dances, and had a large restaurant.

=== Beaumaris Golf and Yacht Clubs ===
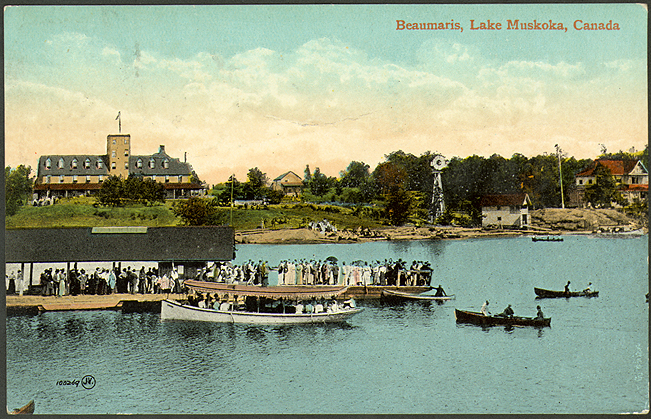
Beaumaris Government Pier circa 1910 with the Beaumaris Hotel and the Beaumaris Yacht Club in the background

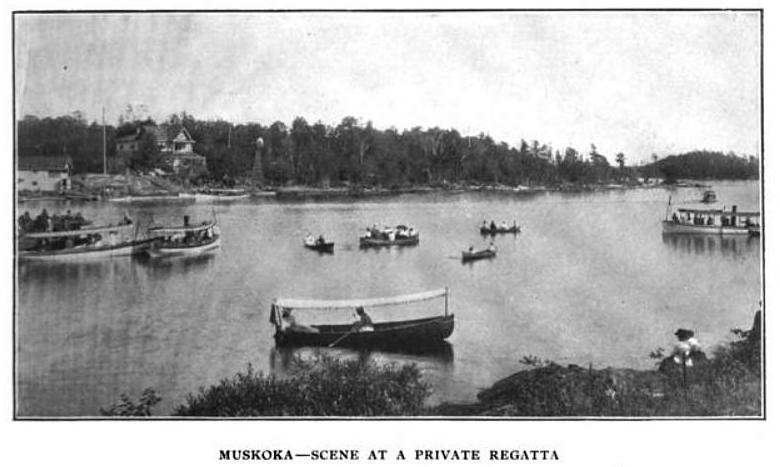
Beaumaris harbor with the cottage "Grumblenot", precursor to the Beaumaris Yacht Club in the background, circa 1903

In 1911 a number of cottagers formed the Beaumaris Golf and Tennis Association which leased the tennis courts and 5 hole golf course from the hotel. The Association enlarged the golf course to 9 holes and in 1919 expanded it to today's 18 holes. They built a clubhouse on the golf course and invited cottager to join. Reflecting the heavily American presence in the area, in 1921 only 3 of the 48 members of the association were Canadian. The Beaumaris Yacht Club was started in 1912 by James Francis Burke and American congressman to foster sailing in the area and to provide what was considered to be a more wholesome environment for children than the hotel's activities offer. In 1921 the Yacht Club purchased its present location, the Gill's cottages called the Grumblenot.

=== The coming of the car ===
World War I caused a significant dip in the tourist activity for the area and hence the economy. After the war, however, significant advances in the automobile brought demand for improved (paved) roads. These two developments, motorboats and private cars brought greater overall development of the area and spread development out over the lakes. Freed from the ports of call of the steamships, people built cottages farther afield. Demand began dropping for the steamship lines. World War II caused another decline as wartime shortages kept many Americans at home and many Canadians were engaged in war activities. Postwar prosperity brought another boom based around the automobile and the newly affordable fiberglass boat. Suddenly owning a summer cottage became possible not only for the adventurous or the wealthy, but for many in the middle class. The steamship companies retired their boats one by one until the last sailing in the late 1950s. The end of the old era for Beaumaris came on 21 July 1945 when, from a small fire in the kitchen, the Beaumaris Hotel was engulfed in flames and burned to the ground. Edward John Van Buren, an employee of the hotel, pleaded guilty to arson and was sentenced to 2 years for the crime. The land under the hotel was eventually purchased by the Beaumaris Land Company which also owned the physical property for the golf and yacht clubs. After several attempts to attract a new hotel to the site, it was eventually turned over to the new golf clubhouse.

== Notable residents ==
Through the years, Beaumaris has hosted a number of prominent cottagers and seasonal residents, including:

- James F. Burke, U.S. Congressman
- Henry Hillman, Pittsburgh businessman
- Tommy Hitchcock Jr., polo player and aviator
- James McKay, Pittsburgh industrialist
- William Larimer Mellon Sr., co-founder of Gulf Oil
