= Joe Satriani discography =

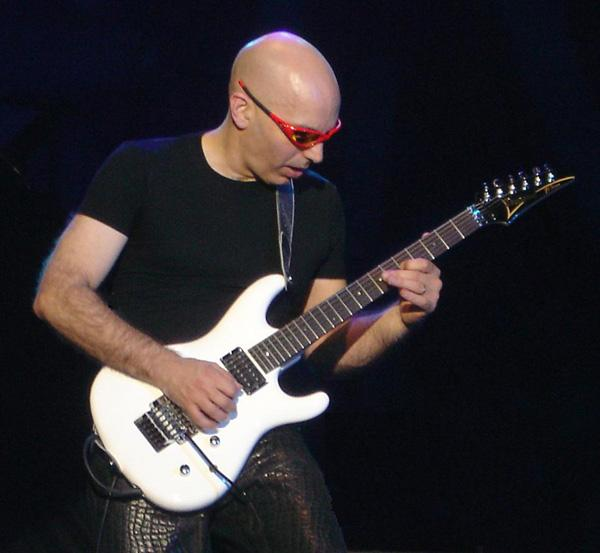
- Satriani in 2005
- Studio albums: 18
- Extended plays: 3
- Live albums: 5
- Compilation albums: 4

This is the discography of Joe Satriani, an American multi-instrumentalist known primarily for his work as an instrumental rock guitarist, with multiple Grammy Award nominations. This discography includes all of his albums, including collaborations with Chickenfoot, Blue Öyster Cult, Stuart Hamm, Alice Cooper, and Spinal Tap, as well as early Squares material and G3 projects (see the collaborations section for more details).

Since his self-titled debut EP in 1984, Satriani has released five live albums, five compilations, four extended plays, and eighteen studio albums, three of which have received Gold certification in the United States, while Surfing with the Alien went Platinum.

== Studio albums ==
| Year | Album details | Peak chart positions | | | | | | | | | Sales | Certifications |
| Year | Album details | US | US Hard Rock | AUS | FRA | GER | NZ | SWE | SWI | UK | Sales | Certifications |
|---|---|---|---|---|---|---|---|---|---|---|---|---|
| 1986 | Not of This Earth: Released: December 18, 1986; Label: Epic; Format: CD, LP, CS, DD | — | — | — | — | — | — | — | — | — | | |
| 1987 | Surfing with the Alien: Released: October 15, 1987; Label: Epic; Format: CD, LP, CS, DD | 29 | — | 10 | — | — | 16 | — | — | — | | ARIA: Gold; BPI: Silver; RIAA: Platinum; RMNZ: Gold |
| 1989 | Flying in a Blue Dream: Released: October 30, 1989; Label: Epic; Format: CD, LP, CS, DD | 23 | — | 21 | — | — | 7 | 34 | — | — | US: 850,000 | ARIA: Gold; BPI: Silver; RIAA: Gold; RMNZ: Gold |
| 1992 | The Extremist: Released: July 21, 1992; Label: Epic; Format: CD, LP, CS, DD | 22 | — | 29 | 13 | 55 | 16 | 35 | 11 | 13 | FR: 134,000; US: 810,000 | RIAA: Gold; SNEP: Gold |
| 1993 | Time Machine: Released: October 26, 1993; Label: Sony Music Distribution; Format: CD, LP, CS, DD | 95 | — | 85 | 8 | 87 | — | — | — | 32 | FR: 122,500 | RIAA: Gold |
| 1995 | Joe Satriani: Released: October 1995; Label: Sony Music Distribution; Format: CD, CS, DD | 51 | — | 72 | 10 | — | 27 | — | 36 | 21 | FR: 72,800; US: 256,422 | |
| 1998 | Crystal Planet: Released: March 3, 1998; Label: Epic; Format: CD, CS, DD | 50 | — | — | 10 | 73 | — | — | 40 | 32 | US: 221,000 (Note: Sales figures for Crystal Planet.) | |
| 2000 | Engines of Creation: Released: March 14, 2000; Label: Epic; Format: CD, SACD, CS, DD | 90 | — | — | 37 | — | — | — | 86 | 78 | US: 111,851 (Note: Sales figures for Engines of Creation.) | |
| 2002 | Strange Beautiful Music: Released: June 25, 2002; Label: Epic; Format: CD, SACD, DD | 80 | — | — | 45 | — | — | — | 83 | 86 | | |
| 2004 | Is There Love in Space?: Released: April 13, 2004; Label: Epic; Format: CD, DD | 80 | — | — | 45 | — | — | — | 83 | 86 | | |
| 2006 | Super Colossal: Released: March 14, 2006; Label: Epic; Format: CD, DD | 86 | — | — | 86 | — | — | — | 83 | 107 | US: 108,000 (Note: Sales figures for Super Colossal.) | |
| 2008 | Professor Satchafunkilus and the Musterion of Rock: Released: April 1, 2008; Label: Epic/RED; Format: CD, DD | 89 | — | 64 | 57 | 92 | — | — | 67 | 75 | FR: 4,200; US: 176,000 (Note: Sales figures for Professor Satchafunkilus.) | |
| 2010 | Black Swans and Wormhole Wizards: Released: October 5, 2010; Label: Epic/RED; Format: CD, DD | 45 | 5 | 84 | 39 | 85 | — | — | 34 | 62 | US: 60,000 (Note: Sales figures for Black Swans and Wormhole Wizards.) | |
| 2013 | Unstoppable Momentum: Released: May 7, 2013; Label: Epic/RED; Format: CD, DD | 42 | 1 | 81 | 77 | 67 | — | 54 | 32 | 44 | US: 50,000 (Note: Sales figures for Unstoppable Momentum.) | |
| 2015 | Shockwave Supernova: Released: July 24, 2015; Label: Sony Music; Format: CD, LP, DD | 46 | 3 | 23 | 32 | 40 | — | — | 13 | 22 | US: 40,000 (Note: Sales figures for Shockwave Supernova.) | |
| 2018 | What Happens Next: Released: January 12, 2018; Label: Sony Music; Format: CD, LP, DD | 42 | 2 | 20 | — | 51 | — | — | 9 | 40 | | |
| 2020 | Shapeshifting: Released: April 10, 2020; Label: Sony Music; Format: CD, LP, DD | — | — | 28 | 101 | 61 | — | — | 6 | 70 | | |
| 2022 | The Elephants of Mars: Released: April 8, 2022; Label: earMUSIC; Format: | — | — | — | — | 22 | — | — | 5 | 57 | | |
"—" denotes releases that did not chart.

== EPs ==
| Year | EP details | Peak positions | | | Certifications |
| Year | EP details | US | SWE | UK | Certifications |
|---|---|---|---|---|---|
| 1984 | Joe Satriani: Released: 1984; Label: Rubina Records; Format: CS, LP, DD | — | — | — | |
| 1988 | Dreaming #11: Released: November 1, 1988; Label: Epic; Format: CD, LP, CS, DD | 42 | 55 | 100 | RIAA: Gold |
| 2000 | Additional Creations: Released: March 14, 2000; Label: Epic; Format: CD | — | — | — | |
| 2016 | Supernova Remix – The Free EP: Released: December 5, 2016; Label: Strange Beautiful Music; Format: MP3, FLAC | — | — | — | |
"—" denotes releases that did not chart.

== Compilations ==
| Year | Album details | Peak |
| Year | Album details | GER |
|---|---|---|
| 1993 | The Beautiful Guitar: Released: 1993; Label: Relativity Records; Format: CD, DD | 53 |
| 2003 | The Electric Joe Satriani: An Anthology: Released: November 18, 2003; Label: Epic/Legacy; Format: CD, DD | — |
| 2005 | One Big Rush: The Genius of Joe Satriani: Released: November 29, 2005; Label: Sony BMG; Format: CD | — |
| 2008 | Joe Satriani Original Album Classics: Released: June 16, 2008; Label: Sony BMG; Format: CD, DD | — |
| 2010 | The Essential Joe Satriani: Released: October 26, 2010; Label: Epic/Legacy; Format: CD | — |
"—" denotes releases that did not chart.

== Live/video albums ==
| Year | Album details | Peak chart positions | | | | | Certifications |
| Year | Album details | US (Video) | AUS (Video) | FRA (Album) | SWE (Video) | SWI (Video) | Certifications |
|---|---|---|---|---|---|---|---|
| 1993 | The Satch Tapes: Released: January 27, 1993; Label: Sony Music; Format: VHS, DVD | — | — | — | — | — | SNEP: Gold |
| 2001 | Live in San Francisco: Released: June 19, 2001; Label: Sony Music Distribution; Format: CD, DVD, DD | 10 | 9 | 69 | 13 | — | ARIA: Gold; BPI: Gold; RIAA: 2× Platinum |
| 2006 | Satriani Live!: Released: October 31, 2006; Label: RED; Format: CD, DVD, DD | — | — | — | — | — | SNEP: Gold |
| 2010 | Live in Paris: I Just Wanna Rock: Released: February 2, 2010; Label: Sony Music; Format: CD, DVD, DD | — | 29 | 197 | — | — | |
| 2012 | Satchurated: Live in Montreal: Released: April 24, 2012; Label: Sony Music; Format: CD, DVD, Blu-ray, DD | 3 | 15 | 198 | 7 | 6 | |
"—" denotes releases that did not chart.

== Projects and collaborations ==
In 1986, Satriani teamed up with Crowded House to record their eponymous studio album, Crowded House. The same year, he also recorded Love and Rock and Roll with The Greg Kihn Band. A year later, the guitarist played on Danny Gottlieb's Aquamarine. He also produced The Eyes of Horror by Possessed. In 1988, Satriani contributed to Radio Free Albemuth by Stuart Hamm and Imaginos by Blue Öyster Cult. For the last release, Satriani worked as the record's producer. In 1991, he played guitar parts on the Alice Cooper album Hey Stoopid. The next year, he worked with Brian May on Back to the Light as well as Break Like the Wind by Spinal Tap. In 1997, he worked with Pat Martino on the album All Sides Now and King Biscuit Flower Hour by the Greg Kihn Band.

Also in 1997, Satriani recorded the album Merry Axemas Volume 1 with Steve Vai, Alex Lifeson, and Joe Perry. In 2003, he worked on The Yardbirds album Birdland. A year later, he was a guest on Jordan Rudess' release, entitled Rhythm of Time. In 2006, the guitarist played on Gillan's Inn by Ian Gillan as well as Transformations Live for the People by Particle. The following year saw Satriani playing on The Devil Knows My Name by John 5 and Guitar Masters, Vol. 1 by Stanley Clarke. In 2008, Satriani added guitar parts to YouTube Live by Funtwo, Jason Becker's Collection, as well as Clean by Dave Martone. In 2010, he worked on Bingo! by the Steve Miller Band and What Lies Beneath by Tarja, followed in 2013 by Steve Hunter's The Manhattan Blues Project. In 2017, Satriani contributed to the tracks "The Healer", "North Bound", "Horsepower", and "Hometown" on the Marco Minnemann album Borrego.

In 2019, he released the album Squares, a collection of tracks recorded by the band Squares, which he formed with his brother-in-law Neil Sheehan in the late 1970s.

Satriani has taken part in all releases by the supergroup Chickenfoot. Their debut studio album, Chickenfoot, sold 560,000 copies in the United States and more than 40,000 in Canada, where the record was also certified Gold. The band's second studio album, Chickenfoot III, sold 35,000 copies in the United States.

In 2020, Satriani played a guitar solo on the track "Get Out! Now!" from Dutch metal opera project Ayreon's tenth album, Transitus. Also in 2020, Satriani was featured on the Cory Wong song "Massive" from Wong's release The Striped Album.

In 2021, Satriani was featured on two Kitt Wakeley singles, "Conflicted" and "Forgive Me". Both are from Wakeley's album Symphony of Sinners & Saints.

=== G3 projects ===
| Year | Release details | Peak positions | | | | | | | | Sales | Certifications |
| Year | Release details | US (Album) | FIN (Album) | FRA (Album) | GER (Album) | ITA (Album) | NED (Album) | SWE (Video) | UK (Album) | Sales | Certifications |
|---|---|---|---|---|---|---|---|---|---|---|---|
| 1997 | G3: Live in Concert: feat. Steve Vai, Eric Johnson; Released: June 3, 1997; Label: Sony Music Distribution; Format: CD, VHS, DVD | 108 | 35 | 20 | 92 | — | 52 | — | 82 | US: 100,000 | RIAA: Platinum (Video) |
| 2003 | G3: Rockin' in the Free World: feat. Steve Vai, Yngwie Malmsteen; Released: February 17, 2004; Label: Epic Records; Format: CD, DVD | — | — | 156 | — | 58 | — | 2 | — | US: 100,000 | RIAA: Platinum (Video) |
| 2005 | G3: Live in Tokyo: feat. Steve Vai, John Petrucci; Released: October 25, 2005; Label: Epic Records; Format: CD, DVD | — | — | — | — | — | — | 6 | — | AU: 15,000 | ARIA: Platinum (Video) |
"—" denotes releases that did not chart.

=== Chickenfoot ===
==== Studio albums ====
| Title | Album details | Peak chart positions | | | | | | | | | | Certifications |
| Title | Album details | US | AUS | AUT | CAN | FIN | FRA | NL | SWE | SWI | UK | Certifications |
|---|---|---|---|---|---|---|---|---|---|---|---|---|
| Chickenfoot | Released: June 5, 2009; Label: Redline Entertainment; Formats: CD, LP, music download | 4 | 50 | 36 | 5 | 36 | 67 | 25 | 36 | 11 | 23 | US: Gold; CAN: Gold |
| Chickenfoot III | Released: September 27, 2011; Label: eOne Music; Formats: CD, LP, music download | 9 | 46 | 11 | 19 | 41 | 81 | 36 | 45 | 12 | 102 | |
"—" denotes releases that did not chart

==== Live albums ====
| Title | Album details |
|---|---|
| LV | Released: December 7, 2012; Label: Edel Records; Formats: CD, music download |

==== Compilations ====
| Title | Album details |
|---|---|
| Best + Live | Released: March 10, 2017; Label: eOne Music; Formats: CD, music download |

==== Singles ====
| Year | Single | US Main. | Album |
|---|---|---|---|
| 2009 | "Oh Yeah" | 21 | Chickenfoot |
| 2009 | "Soap on a Rope" | — | Chickenfoot |
| 2009 | "Sexy Little Thing" | 40 | Chickenfoot |
| 2010 | "Get It Up" | — | Chickenfoot |
| 2010 | "My Kinda Girl" | — | Chickenfoot |
| 2011 | "Big Foot" | 32 | Chickenfoot III |
| 2011 | "Three and a Half Letters" | — | Chickenfoot III |
| 2012 | "Different Devil" | — | Chickenfoot III |
| 2013 | "Something Going Wrong" | — | LV |
| 2017 | "Divine Termination" | — | Best + Live |
"—" denotes releases that did not chart
