= The Electric Joe Satriani: An Anthology =

Compilation album by Joe Satriani
- Released: November 18, 2003
- Recorded: 1985–2002
- Genres: Instrumental rock, hard rock, blues rock
- Length: 144:13
- Label: Epic
- Producer: Joe Satriani

Joe Satriani chronology
The Beautiful Guitar (1993)	The Electric Joe Satriani: An Anthology (2003)	One Big Rush: The Genius of Joe Satriani (2005)

Professional ratings
Review scores
Source	Rating
Allmusic	4.5/5 stars

The Electric Joe Satriani: An Anthology is an album by the guitarist Joe Satriani, released in 2003. On two CDs, it consists of a collection of the best of Satriani's electric guitar tracks remastered. It also contains the songs "Slick" and "The Eight Steps", which were previously only available in Japan. It was released exactly the same day as the release of his former student Steve Vai's compilation album The Infinite Steve Vai: An Anthology.

== Track listing ==
All tracks are written by Joe Satriani.

Disc one
No.	Title	Original release	Length
1.	"Surfing with the Alien"	Surfing with the Alien, 1987	4:24
2.	"Satch Boogie"	Surfing with the Alien	3:13
3.	"Always with me, Always with You"	Surfing with the Alien	3:22
4.	"Crushing Day"	Surfing with the Alien	5:14
5.	"Flying in a Blue Dream"	Flying in a Blue Dream, 1989	5:23
6.	"The Mystical Potato Head Groove Thing"	Flying in a Blue Dream	5:09
7.	"I Believe"	Flying in a Blue Dream	5:51
8.	"Big Bad Moon"	Flying in a Blue Dream	5:15
9.	"Friends"	The Extremist, 1992	3:29
10.	"The Extremist"	The Extremist	3:43
11.	"Summer Song"	The Extremist	4:58
12.	"Why"	The Extremist	4:45
13.	"Time Machine"	Time Machine, 1993	5:07
14.	"Cool #9"	Joe Satriani, 1995	5:59
15.	"Down, Down, Down"	Joe Satriani	6:11

Disc two
No.	Title	Original release	Length
1.	"The Crush of Love"	Dreaming #11, 1988	4:20
2.	"Ceremony"	Crystal Planet, 1998	4:52
3.	"Crystal Planet"	Crystal Planet	4:34
4.	"Raspberry Jam Delta-V"	Crystal Planet	5:21
5.	"Love Thing"	Crystal Planet	3:50
6.	"Borg Sex"	Engines of Creation, 2000	5:27
7.	"Until We Say Goodbye"	Engines of Creation	4:31
8.	"Devil's Slide"	Engines of Creation	5:09
9.	"Clouds Race Across the Sky"	Engines of Creation	6:12
10.	"Starry Night"	Strange Beautiful Music, 2002	3:53
11.	"Mind Storm"	Strange Beautiful Music	4:10
12.	"Slick"	previously unreleased	3:41
13.	"The Eight Steps"	Strange Beautiful Music (Japanese release only bonus track)	5:44
14.	"Not of This Earth"	Not of This Earth, 1986	3:57
15.	"Rubina"	Not of This Earth	5:52
