= Starry Night (Joe Satriani song) =

Single by Joe Satriani

from the album Strange Beautiful Music
- Released: June 10, 2002
- Recorded: Early 2002
- Genre: Instrumental rock
- Length: 3:53
- Label: Epic
- Songwriter: Joe Satriani
- Producers: Joe Satriani, John Cuniberti, Eric Caudieux

Joe Satriani singles chronology
"Until We Say Goodbye" (2000)	"Starry Night" (2002)	"Light Years Away" (2010)

"Starry Night" is a single by guitarist Joe Satriani, released on June 10, 2002, through Epic Records. It is an instrumental track from his ninth studio album Strange Beautiful Music, and was nominated for Best Rock Instrumental Performance at the 2003 Grammys.

== Track listing ==
All music is composed by Joe Satriani.

No.	Title	Length
1.	"Starry Night"	3:53
Total length:		3:53
