= Ceremony (Joe Satriani song) =

Single by Joe Satriani

from the album Crystal Planet
- Released: 1998
- Genre: Instrumental rock
- Length: 3:42
- Label: Epic
- Songwriter(s): Joe Satriani
- Producer(s): Mike Fraser

Joe Satriani singles chronology
"(You're) My World" (1995)	"Ceremony" (1998)	"Until We Say Goodbye" (2000)

"Ceremony" is a single by guitarist Joe Satriani, released in 1998 through Epic Records. It is an instrumental track from his seventh studio album, Crystal Planet, and reached No. 28 on the U.S. Billboard Mainstream Rock chart.

== Track listing ==
All music is composed by Joe Satriani

No.	Title	Length
1.	"Ceremony" (radio edit)	3:42
2.	"Ceremony" (album version)	4:53
Total length:		08:35
