= Is There Love in Space? =

Studio album by Joe Satriani
- Released: April 13, 2004
- Recorded: Late 2003–early 2004 at The Plant Studios in Sausalito, California; Studio 21 in San Francisco
- Genre: Instrumental rock, hard rock
- Length: 58:08
- Label: Epic
- Producer: Joe Satriani

Joe Satriani chronology
G3: Rockin' in the Free World (2004)	Is There Love in Space? (2004)	G3: Live in Tokyo (2005)

Professional ratings
Review scores
Source	Rating
AllMusic	3.5/5 stars

Is There Love in Space? is the tenth studio album by guitarist Joe Satriani, released on April 13, 2004, through Epic Records. The album reached No. 80 on the U.S. Billboard 200 and remained on that chart for two weeks, as well as reaching the top 100 in three other countries.

== Overview ==
Recording for Is There Love in Space? took place from late 2003 to early 2004 and the title was announced on March 22, 2004. Notably, Satriani sings for the first time since his self-titled 1995 album, Joe Satriani, on the songs "Lifestyle" and "I Like the Rain".

== Coldplay plagiarism allegation ==
On December 4, 2008, a lawsuit was filed by Satriani accusing the band Coldplay of plagiarizing "substantial original portions" of his composition "If I Could Fly" on their 2008 song "Viva la Vida". The case was dismissed by the California Central District Court on September 14, 2009, with both parties agreeing to pay their own trial costs.

== Track listing ==
All tracks are written by Joe Satriani.

No.	Title	Length
1.	"Gnaahh"	3:33
2.	"Up in Flames"	4:33
3.	"Hands in the Air"	4:27
4.	"Lifestyle"	4:34
5.	"Is There Love in Space?"	4:50
6.	"If I Could Fly"	6:31
7.	"The Souls of Distortion"	4:58
8.	"Just Look Up"	4:50
9.	"I Like the Rain"	4:00
10.	"Searching"	10:07
11.	"Bamboo"	5:45
Total length:		58:08

iTunes edition bonus track
No.	Title	Length
12.	"Tumble"	3:44

Japanese edition bonus track
No.	Title	Length
12.	"Dog with Crown & Earring"	4:32

== Personnel ==
- Joe Satriani – vocals, guitar, keyboard, bass, harmonica, engineering, production
- Jeff Campitelli – drums, percussion
- Matt Bissonette – bass
- John Cuniberti – tambourine, engineering
- Z.Z. Satriani – bass (track 11)
- Mike Manning – sound effects (track 9)
- Eric Caudieux – digital editing
- Justin Phelps – engineering assistance
- Mike Boden – engineering assistance
- Mike Fraser – mixing
- George Marino – mastering

== Charts ==
Chart (2004)	Peak position
Dutch Albums (Album Top 100)	97
French Albums (SNEP)	45
Greek Albums (IFPI)	11
Italian Albums (FIMI)	53
Scottish Albums (Official Charts)	77
Swiss Albums (Schweizer Hitparade)	83
UK Albums (Official Charts)	86
UK Rock & Metal Albums (Official Charts)	7
US Billboard 200	80
US Top Internet Albums (Billboard)	80
