= Professor Satchafunkilus and the Musterion of Rock =

Studio album by Joe Satriani
- Released: March 31, 2008
- Recorded: October 29, 2007 – early 2008
- Studios: The Plant (Sausalito, California); Studio 21 (San Francisco)
- Genre: Instrumental rock
- Length: 54:15
- Label: Epic
- Producers: Joe Satriani, John Cuniberti

Joe Satriani chronology
| Satriani Live! (2006) | Professor Satchafunkilus and the Musterion of Rock (2008) | Live in Paris: I Just Wanna Rock (2008) |

Professor Satchafunkilus and the Musterion of Rock is the twelfth studio album by guitarist Joe Satriani, released on April 1, 2008, through Epic Records. The album reached No. 89 on the U.S. Billboard 200 and remained on that chart for two weeks, as well as reaching the top 100 in four other countries.

== Release and tour ==
Recording for Professor Satchafunkilus began in October 2007 and the title was announced on March 13, 2008. Touring began in Europe from April to June with guitarist Paul Gilbert as the opening act, followed by Australia and New Zealand in July, Mexico and South America from late July to August, and concluding in North America from October to November.

== Overview ==
The album's title has two meanings: the first part is a homage to Satriani's nickname of "Satch", while "Musterion" is a Greco–Biblical word meaning "hidden thing", "secret", or "mystery". From the date of the album's release until April 11, 2008, Satriani began a special "Guitar Center Sessions" tour, followed by a worldwide tour on April 30.

All tracks were composed in 2007, with the exception of "Come on Baby", which, as Satriani explains, was written in 1993 amid a snowstorm during a vacation in Lake Tahoe. His son ZZ later encouraged him to finish the piece, upon which it became the third song dedicated to his wife Rubina (after "Rubina" from Not of This Earth, and "Rubina's Blue Sky Happiness" from The Extremist). It was later used by Canadian figure skater Vaughn Chipeur for his short program at the 2010 Canadian Figure Skating Championships.

"Revelation" was written about the death of fellow guitarist Steve Morse's father, as well as being a tribute of sorts to Morse's playing.

As with "One Robot's Dream" from Super Colossal (2006), Satriani continues with the theme of exploring the humanistic side of robots on "I Just Wanna Rock". On a podcast detailing the making of the album, he explained the track to be about a robot's experiences at a rock concert.

The final two tracks, "Asik Vaysel" and "Andalusia", were both inspired by the late Aşık Veysel, a critically acclaimed figure of Turkish folk literature. "Andalusia" features a melody (from 1:40 to 1:53) which was previously played by Satriani on his 1993 video The Satch Tapes, during an acoustic guitar segment. On a podcast prior to the album's release, Satriani explained that a publishing error was the reason why Aşık Veysel's name was misspelled "Asik Vaysel" on the back cover, and that it would be corrected on subsequent pressings.

== Critical reception ==
Professional ratings
Review scores
| Source | Rating |
|---|---|
| AllMusic | 3/5 stars |
| Record Collector | 4/5 stars |

Jason Lymangrover at AllMusic gave Professor Satchafunkilus three stars out of five, saying that Satriani "shines in his ability to hold back and write tasteful verse/chorus songs with memorable hooks." The songs on the album were described as "technically impressive numbers that never go overboard with the showboating and rely on a sense of feeling rather than virtuoso technique." One song that was criticized as a low point was "I Just Wanna Rock", but highlights included "Overdriver", "Musterion", "Andalusia", "Asik Vaysel", and the title track.

== Track listing ==
All music is composed by Joe Satriani.

| No. | Title | Length |
|---|---|---|
| 1. | "Musterion" | 4:37 |
| 2. | "Overdriver" | 5:06 |
| 3. | "I Just Wanna Rock" | 3:27 |
| 4. | "Professor Satchafunkilus" | 4:47 |
| 5. | "Revelation" | 5:57 |
| 6. | "Come on Baby" | 5:49 |
| 7. | "Out of the Sunrise" | 5:43 |
| 8. | "Diddle-Y-A-Doo-Dat" | 4:16 |
| 9. | "Asik Vaysel" | 7:42 |
| 10. | "Andalusia" | 6:51 |
| Total length: | | 54:15 |

iTunes edition bonus track
| No. | Title | Length |
|---|---|---|
| 11. | "Ghosts" | 4:28 |

== Personnel ==
- Joe Satriani – vocals, guitar, keyboard, piano, organ, bass (tracks 1, 4, 7), talk box, hand claps (track 4), engineering, mixing, production
- Jeff Campitelli – drums, percussion (tracks 2, 4, 9, 10), bongos, shaker, tambourine (track 3), cowbell, hand claps (tracks 4, 10)
- John Cuniberti – tambourine (tracks 6–8), hand claps (track 4), engineering, mixing, production
- Matt Bissonette – bass (tracks 2–6, 8–10)
- ZZ Satriani – saxophone
- Eric Caudieux – digital editing, sound design
- Mike Boden – hand claps (tracks 4, 10), digital editing, engineering assistance
- Bernie Grundman – mastering

== Charts ==
Chart performance for Professor Satchafunkilus and the Musterion of Rock
| Chart (2008) | Peak position |
|---|---|
| Australian Albums (ARIA) | 64 |
| Dutch Albums (Album Top 100) | 57 |
| French Albums (SNEP) | 57 |
| German Albums (Offizielle Top 100) | 92 |
| Italian Albums (FIMI) | 77 |
| UK Albums (Official Charts) | 75 |
| US Billboard 200 | 89 |
| US Independent Albums (Billboard) | 9 |
