= Satriani Live! =

Live album by Joe Satriani
- Released: October 31, 2006
- Recorded: May 2, 2006
- Genre: Instrumental rock
- Length: 128:28
- Label: Red Ink
- Producer: Joe Satriani

Joe Satriani chronology
Super Colossal (2006)	Satriani Live! (2006)	Professor Satchafunkilus and the Musterion of Rock (2008)

Satriani Live! is a live album and DVD by Joe Satriani. It was recorded on May 2, 2006, in Anaheim, California, and released on October 31, 2006.

== Critical reception ==
Professional ratings
Review scores
Source	Rating
Allmusic	4/5 stars

In his review for AllMusic, William Ruhlmann described ‘‘Satriani Live!’’ as a retrospective of Joe Satriani’s career, noting that its setlist drew heavily from ‘‘Surfing with the Alien’’ (1987), alongside selections from ‘‘Flying in a Blue Dream’’ (1989), ‘‘The Extremist’’ (1992) and ‘‘Joe Satriani’’ (1995). He praised the concert’s pacing, highlighting the contrast between the energetic opening performances and the more melodic material in the second half, before Satriani brought the show to a powerful conclusion. Ruhlmann considered the album an effective introduction to Satriani’s catalogue for casual listeners, while established fans could appreciate the differences between the live arrangements and their studio counterparts.

== Track listing ==
On some copies of the CD, Tracks 1 and 3 are mistakenly swapped. All songs written by Joe Satriani.

=== Disc 1 ===
1. "Flying in a Blue Dream" - 8:38
2. "The Extremist" - 3:40
3. "Redshift Riders" - 4:46
4. "Cool #9" - 8:02
5. "A Cool New Way" - 10:00
6. "Satch Boogie" - 5:18
7. "Super Colossal" - 4:17
8. "Just Like Lightnin'" - 5:00
9. "Ice 9" - 4:28
10. "One Robot's Dream" - 8:02

=== Disc 2 ===
1. "Ten Words" - 3:35
2. "The Mystical Potato Head Groove Thing" - 7:36
3. "The Meaning of Love" 4:59
4. "Made of Tears" - 10:23
5. "Circles" - 9:49
6. "Always with Me, Always with You" - 9:43
7. "Surfing with the Alien" - 7:48
8. "Crowd Chant" - 3:14
9. "Summer Song" - 9:11

== Personnel ==
- Joe Satriani - lead guitar, harmonica, keyboards
- Galen Henson - rhythm guitar
- Dave LaRue - bass
- Jeff Campitelli - drums

== Charts ==
=== Weekly charts ===
Chart performance for Satriani Live!
Chart (2006–07)	Peak position
Greek Musik DVD (IFPI)	8
Portuguese Music DVD (AFP)	26
US Music Videos (Billboard)	26
