= Until We Say Goodbye =

Single by Joe Satriani

from the album Engines of Creation
- Released: 2000
- Recorded: 1999
- Genre: Instrumental rock, soft rock
- Length: 4:31
- Label: Epic
- Songwriter(s): Joe Satriani
- Producer(s): Joe Satriani, Eric Caudieux, Kevin Shirley

Joe Satriani singles chronology
"Ceremony" (1998)	"Until We Say Goodbye" (2000)	"Starry Night" (2002)

"Until We Say Goodbye" is a single by guitarist Joe Satriani, released in 2000 through Epic Records. It is an instrumental track from his eighth studio album Engines of Creation, and was nominated for Best Rock Instrumental Performance at the 2001 Grammys.

== Track listing ==
All music is composed by Joe Satriani

No.	Title	Length
1.	"Until We Say Goodbye"	4:31
Total length:		4:31
