= The Beautiful Guitar =

Compilation album by Joe Satriani
- Released: 1993
- Genre: Instrumental rock
- Length: 58:18
- Label: Relativity Records

Joe Satriani chronology
The Beautiful Guitar (1993)	The Electric Joe Satriani: An Anthology (2003)

The Beautiful Guitar is a compilation album released by instrumental rock artist Joe Satriani in 1993. It was only released in Europe, and contained various softer, ballad-like songs (As opposed to more rock-oriented hits such as "Surfing with the Alien") from his six previous albums.

== Track listing ==
1. "Cryin'" – 5:44
2. "Always with Me, Always with You" – 3:24
3. "Thinking of You" – 3:56
4. "The Crush of Love" (Satriani, John Cuniberti) – 4:22
5. "I Believe" – 5:54
6. "Rubina" – 5:54
7. "Tears in the Rain" – 1:18
8. "All Alone" – 4:23
9. "Why" – 4:46
10. "Echo" – 5:39
11. "Midnight" – 1:43
12. "Rubina's Blue Sky Happiness" – 6:10
13. "Day at the Beach" – 2:05
14. "Saying Goodbye" – 2:51
