= One Big Rush: The Genius of Joe Satriani =

Compilation album by Joe Satriani
- Released: November 29, 2005
- Genre: Instrumental rock
- Label: Sony
- Producer: Joe Satriani

Joe Satriani chronology
The Electric Joe Satriani: An Anthology (2003)	One Big Rush: The Genius of Joe Satriani (2005)	Joe Satriani Original Album Classics (2008)

One Big Rush: The Genius of Joe Satriani is a music album by guitarist Joe Satriani, released in 2005. The album contains numerous hits that he has created over the past few decades.

In addition to production and guitar by Joe Satriani, Featured artists include direction by Joel Zimmerman and cover photography by Jay Blakesberg.

== Track listing ==
1. "One Big Rush" - 3:27
2. "Surfing with the Alien" - 4:23
3. "Sleep Walk" - 2:45
4. "Belly Dancer" - 5:02
5. "Back to Shalla-Bal" - 3:16
6. "(You're) My World" - 3:56
7. "Motorcycle Driver" - 4:58
8. "All Alone" - 4:22
9. "Cryin'" - 5:43
10. "Up In Flames" - 4:33
