= SATCHVAI Band =

American rock supergroup

- Origin: United States
- Genres: Hard rock; blues rock
- Years active: 2024–present
- Label: earMUSIC
- Members: Joe Satriani; Steve Vai; Kenny Aronoff; Marco Mendoza; Pete Thorn
- Website: satchvaiband.com

SATCHVAI Band is an American rock supergroup formed by guitarists Joe Satriani and Steve Vai. It also includes drummer Kenny Aronoff, bassist Marco Mendoza, and guitarist Pete Thorn. The group was announced in December 2025, following a series of tours and collaborative releases.

== History ==
In 2025, Joe Satriani and Steve Vai announced the Surfing with the Hydra Tour across Europe as SATCHVAI Band, marking their first permanent band collaboration beyond their long-term friendship and occasional co-bill performances.

In 2026, the band announced a North American leg of the tour, with support from Animals as Leaders, spanning April to May. Their debut album, The Sea of Emotion, was released on November 6, 2026.

== Band members ==
- Joe Satriani – guitar
- Steve Vai – guitar
- Kenny Aronoff – drums
- Marco Mendoza – bass
- Pete Thorn – rhythm guitar
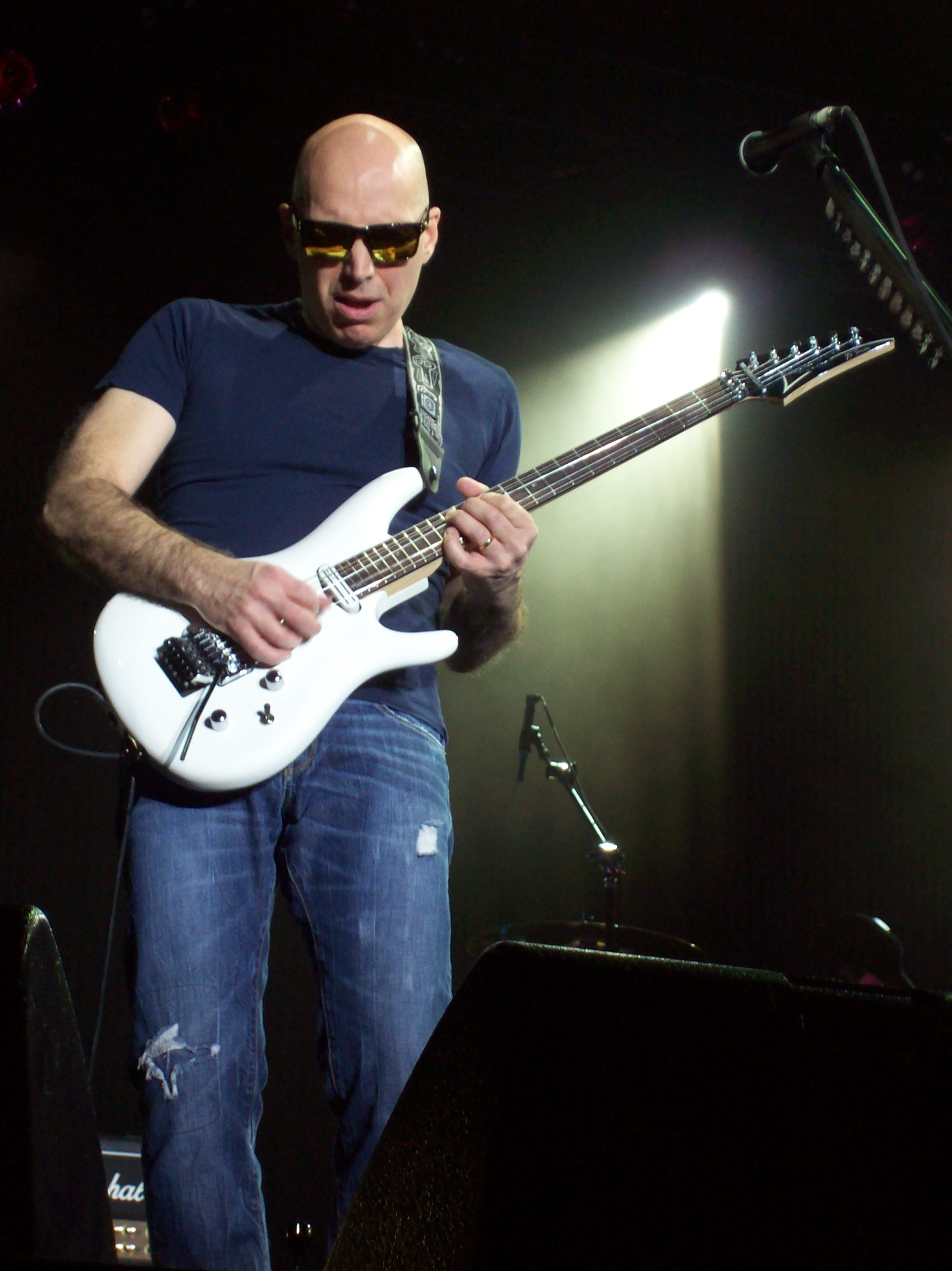
Joe Satriani in 2010

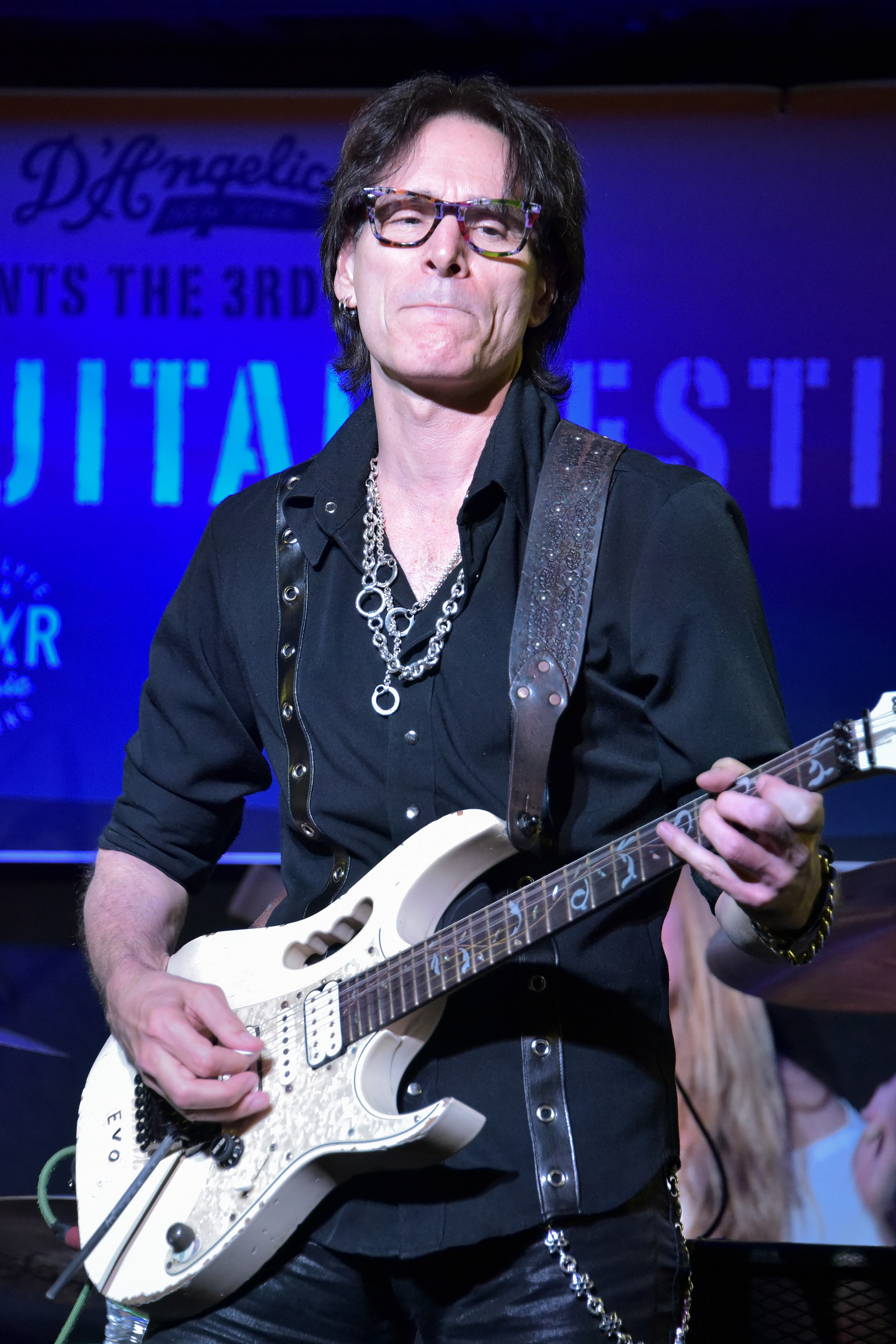
Steve Vai in 2017

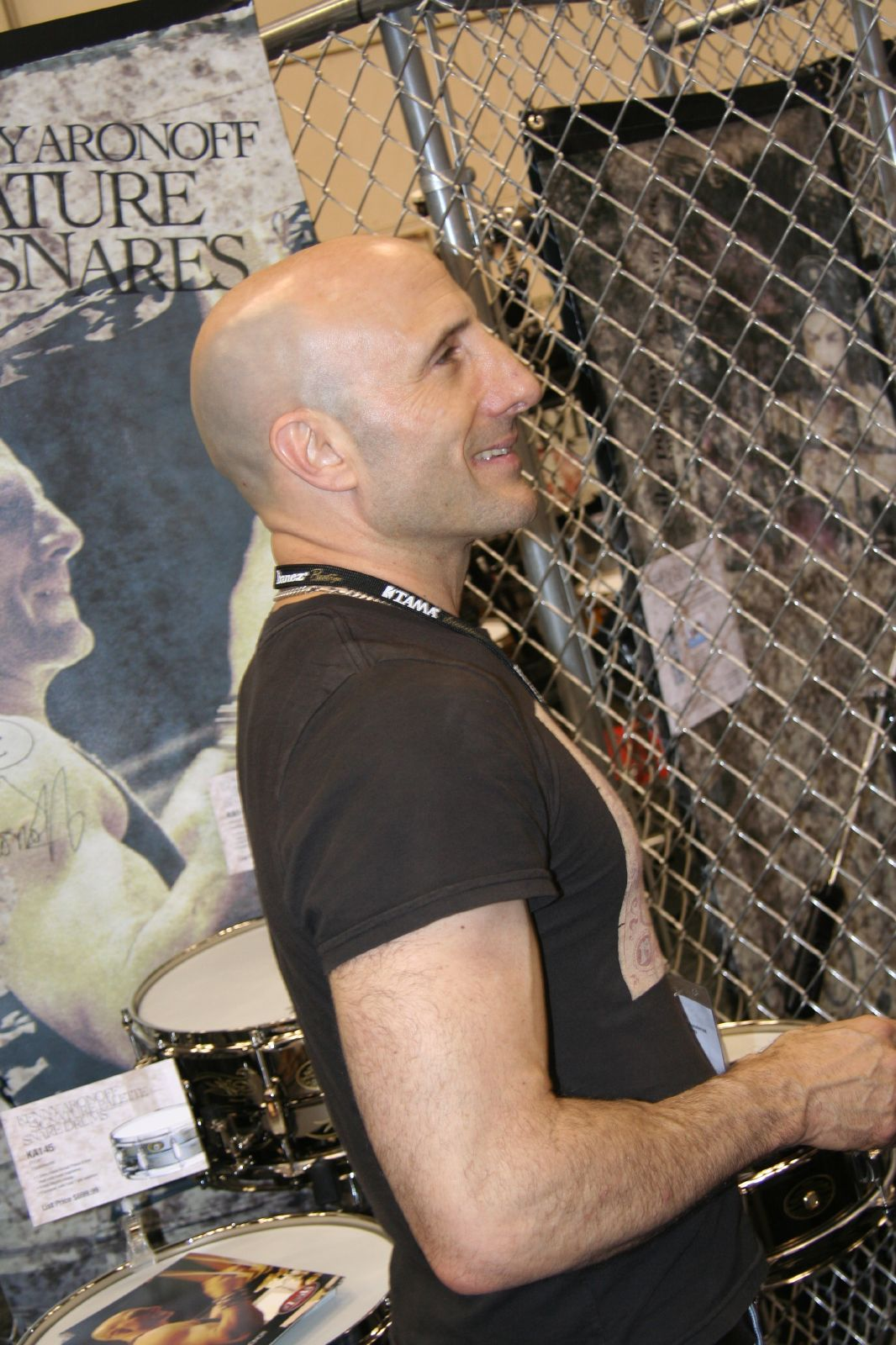
Kenny Aronoff in 2005

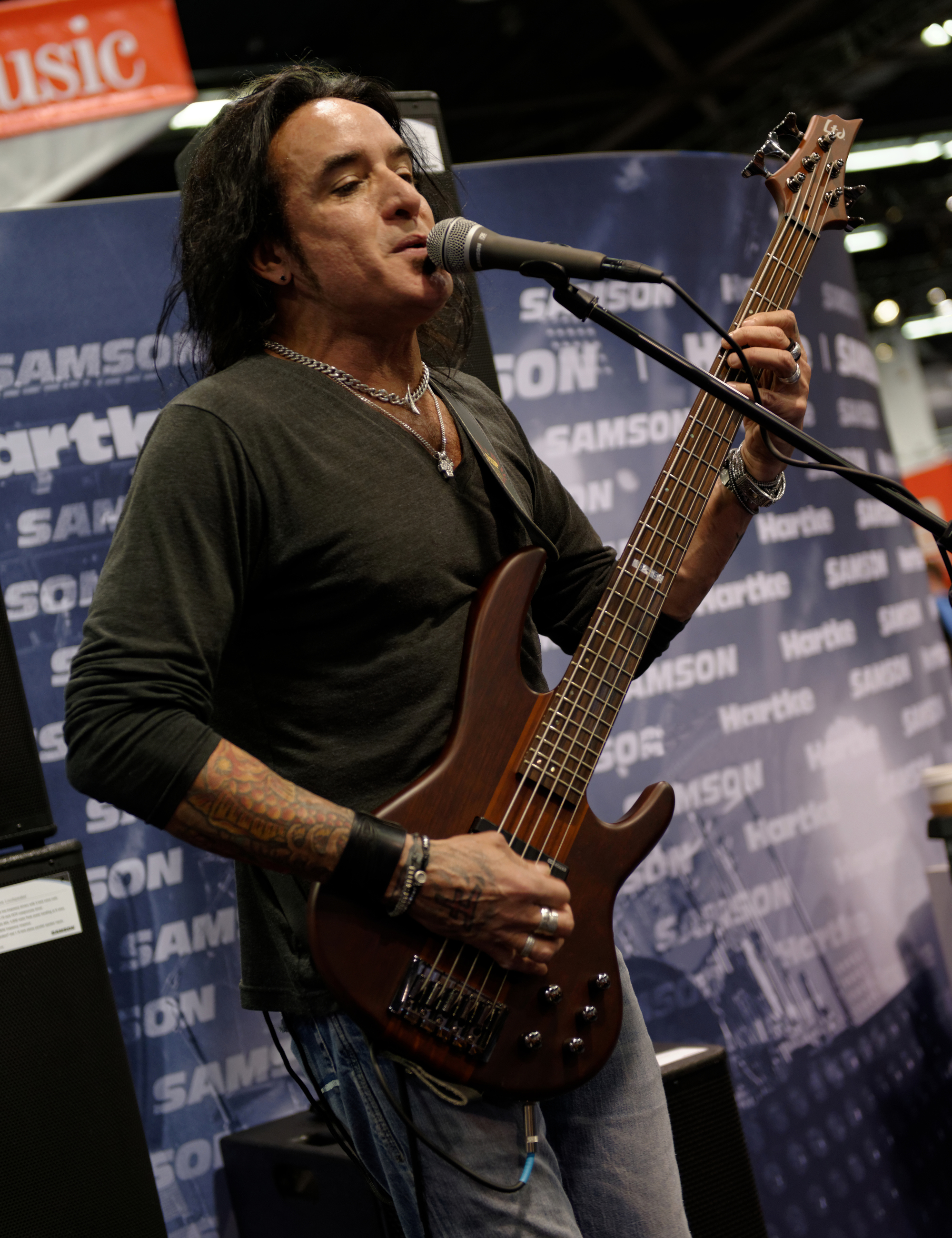
Marco Mendoza in 2014

== Discography ==
Studio albums

- The Sea of Emotion (2026)

Singles

- "The Sea of Emotion, Pt. 1" (2024)
- "I Wanna Play My Guitar" (featuring Glenn Hughes) (2025)
- "Dancing" (2026)
- "Mayhem" (2026)
