= Live in San Francisco (Joe Satriani album) =

Live album by Joe Satriani
- Released: June 19, 2001
- Recorded: December 28 and/or December 29, 2000
- Venue: The Fillmore (San Francisco)
- Genre: Instrumental rock
- Length: 147:32
- Label: Sony
- Producer: Joe Satriani

Joe Satriani chronology
Engines of Creation (2000)	Live in San Francisco (2001)	Strange Beautiful Music (2002)

Professional ratings
Review scores
Source	Rating
AllMusic	4/5 stars
Kerrang!	2/5 stars

Live in San Francisco is a 2001 live album by instrumental rock solo artist Joe Satriani. Also available on DVD, including non-performance bonus footage (backstage, etc.).

== Track listing ==
All songs by Joe Satriani except where noted.

=== Disc one ===
1. "Time" – 8:10
2. "Devil's Slide" – 4:44
3. "The Crush of Love" (Satriani, John Cuniberti) – 5:04
4. "Satch Boogie" – 5:28
5. "Borg Sex" – 5:28
6. "Flying in a Blue Dream" – 6:41
7. "Ice 9" – 4:54
8. "Cool #9" – 6:16
9. "Circles" – 4:20
10. "Until We Say Goodbye" – 5:36
11. "Ceremony" – 5:57
12. "The Extremist" – 3:39
13. "Summer Song" – 8:45

=== Disc two ===
1. "House Full of Bullets" – 6:55
2. "One Big Rush" – 4:06
3. "Raspberry Jam Delta-V" – 6:53
4. "Crystal Planet" – 6:02
5. "Love Thing" – 3:48
6. "Bass Solo" (Stuart Hamm) – 6:28
7. "The Mystical Potato Head Groove Thing" – 6:24
8. "Always with Me, Always with You" – 3:50
9. "Big Bad Moon" – 6:32
10. "Friends" – 4:07
11. "Surfing with the Alien" – 9:17
12. "Rubina" – 8:08

== Personnel ==
- Joe Satriani – Guitar, Harmonica, Vocals
- Jeff Campitelli – Percussion and Drums
- Stuart Hamm – Bass
- Eric Caudieux – Keyboards and rhythm guitar

== Charts ==
Chart performance for Live in San Francisco
Chart (2001–06)	Peak position
Argentine Music DVD (CAPIF)	11
Australian Music DVD (ARIA)	9
French Albums (SNEP)	69
New Zealand Music DVD (RMNZ)	5
Swedish Music DVD (Sverigetopplistan)	13
US Top Music Videos (Billboard)	10

== Certifications ==
Region	Certification	Certified units/sales
United Kingdom (BPI)	Gold	25,000^{*}
United States (RIAA)	2× Platinum	200,000^{^}
^{*} Sales figures based on certification alone.^{^} Shipments figures based on certification alone.
