= Crystal Planet =

Studio album by Joe Satriani
- Released: March 3, 1998
- Studios: The Plant Studios (Sausalito); The Site; H.O.S. Recording; Hyde Street (San Francisco); Fantasy (Berkeley)
- Genre: Instrumental rock
- Length: 67:37
- Label: Epic
- Producers: Joe Satriani; Eric Valentine; Mike Fraser; John Cuniberti

Joe Satriani chronology
G3: Live in Concert (1997)	Crystal Planet (1998)	Engines of Creation (2000)

Singles from Crystal Planet
- 1. "Ceremony" Released: 1998

Crystal Planet is the seventh studio album by the American guitarist Joe Satriani, released on March 3, 1998, by Epic Records. It was his first album to be released on Epic, whereas his previous six albums were released by Relativity Records. Crystal Planet reached No. 50 on the U.S. Billboard 200 and remained on that chart for eight weeks, as well as reaching the top 100 in five other countries. "Ceremony" was released as a single, reaching No. 28 on Billboard's Mainstream Rock chart and featuring Satriani's first recorded use of a seven-string guitar, the Ibanez Universe. "A Train of Angels" was nominated for Best Rock Instrumental Performance at the 1999 Grammy Awards, Satriani's ninth nomination.

== Reissues ==
Crystal Planet has been reissued twice. The first was on June 16, 2008, as part of the Original Album Classics box set, and then again as part of The Complete Studio Recordings, released on April 22, 2014, by Legacy Recordings; this is a box set compilation containing remastered editions of every Satriani studio album from 1986 to 2013.

== Critical reception ==
Professional ratings
Review scores
Source	Rating
AllMusic	4/5 stars

Stephen Thomas Erlewine at AllMusic called Crystal Planet "an instrumental record with a difference" and Satriani's "finest all-instrumental effort since Surfing With the Alien". He praised Satriani for "taking more chances than ever" and further developing his technique, saying that it reaches "new, uncharted waters".

== Track listing ==
All music is composed by Joe Satriani, except where noted.

No.	Title	Length
1.	"Up in the Sky"	4:09
2.	"House Full of Bullets"	5:33
3.	"Crystal Planet"	4:34
4.	"Love Thing"	3:50
5.	"Trundrumbalind"	5:13
6.	"Lights of Heaven"	4:23
7.	"Raspberry Jam Delta-v"	5:21
8.	"Ceremony"	4:53
9.	"With Jupiter in Mind"	5:46
10.	"Secret Prayer"	4:27
11.	"A Train of Angels" (J. Satriani, Z.Z. Satriani)	3:42
12.	"A Piece of Liquid" (J. Satriani, Z.Z. Satriani)	3:04
13.	"Psycho Monkey" (J. Satriani, Z.Z. Satriani)	4:36
14.	"Time"	5:05
15.	"Z.Z.'s Song"	3:01
Total length:		67:37

== Personnel ==
- Joe Satriani – guitar, guitar synthesizer, keyboard (tracks 5, 7, 13, 14), bass (tracks 2, 13, 14), harmonica, clapping (track 7), mixing (tracks 14, 15), producer (tracks 13–15)
- Eric Caudieux – keyboard (tracks 3, 7, 9, 12), programming, orchestration, editing
- Eric Valentine – keyboard (track 14), drums (tracks 13, 14), percussion (tracks 13, 14), bass (track 14), engineering (tracks 13, 14), mixing (track 14), production (tracks 13, 14)
- Jeff Campitelli – drums (tracks 1–12), percussion (tracks 1, 4, 6, 8–12), clapping (track 7)
- Elk Thunder – percussion (track 8)
- Rhoades Howe – percussion (track 14), engineering assistance (tracks 13, 14)
- Stuart Hamm – bass (tracks 1, 3–12)
- Mike Manning – clapping (track 7)
- Mike Fraser – clapping (track 7), engineering (tracks 1–13), mixing (tracks 1–13), production (tracks 1–13)
- John Cuniberti – engineering (tracks 14, 15), mixing (tracks 15), production (tracks 14, 15)
- Kent Matcke – engineering assistance (tracks 1–10, 12)
- Kevin Scott – engineering assistance (tracks 1–12), mixing assistance (track 14)
- Stephen Hart – engineering assistance (track 15)
- Judy Kirschner – engineering assistance
- Zac Allentuck – mixing assistance (tracks 1–10, 12, 13)
- George Marino – mastering

== Charts ==
Chart (1998)	Peak position
Canada Top Albums/CDs (RPM)	59
Dutch Albums (Album Top 100)	54
Finnish Albums (Suomen virallinen lista)	35
French Albums (SNEP)	10
German Albums (Offizielle Top 100)	73
Hungarian Albums (MAHASZ)	33
Scottish Albums (Official Charts)	41
Swiss Albums (Schweizer Hitparade)	40
UK Albums (Official Charts)	32
UK Rock & Metal Albums (Official Charts)	1
US Billboard 200	50

== Sales ==
Region	Certification	Certified units/sales
United States	—	202,416

== Awards ==
Event	Title	Award	Result
1999 Grammys	"A Train of Angels"	Best Rock Instrumental Performance	Nominated
