= Live in Paris: I Just Wanna Rock =

Live In Paris: I Just Wanna Rock

Live album by Joe Satriani
- Released: February 2, 2010
- Recorded: May 27, 2008
- Genre: Instrumental rock
- Length: 126:31
- Label: Sony
- Producer: Joe Satriani

Joe Satriani chronology
| Professor Satchafunkilus and the Musterion of Rock (2008) | Live In Paris: I Just Wanna Rock (2010) | Black Swans and Wormhole Wizards (2010) |

Live In Paris: I Just Wanna Rock is the third live album by guitarist Joe Satriani, released in February 2010. It is a 2-CD live set of his live concert in Paris, France, on May 27, 2008.

== Critical reception ==
Professional ratings
Review scores
| Source | Rating |
|---|---|
| AllMusic | 3/5 stars |

Stephen Thomas Erlewine of AllMusic praised Live in Paris: I Just Wanna Rock, describing it as a crowd-pleasing release that showcased Satriani's ability to find new approaches to familiar material. He noted that the set drew heavily from Professor Satchafunkilus and the Musterion of Rock, but argued that the performances were more significant than the song selection, highlighting Satriani's fluid and inventive guitar playing. Erlewine particularly commended the guitarist's nuanced phrasing, which he observed remained effective regardless of playing speed or volume, concluding that the album offered "as many marvelous moments as his other live sets".

== Track listing ==
All songs written by Joe Satriani except where noted.

=== Disc 1 ===
1. "I Just Wanna Rock" - 3:53
2. "Overdriver" - 5:18
3. "Satch Boogie" - 4:36
4. "Ice 9" - 4:38
5. "Diddle-Y-A-Doo-Dat" - 4:15
6. "Flying In A Blue Dream" - 5:40
7. "Ghosts" - 4:52
8. "Revelation" - 6:31
9. "Super Colossal" - 4:36
10. "One Big Rush" - 3:38
11. "Musterion" - 4:53
12. "Out Of The Sunrise" - 6:28

=== Disc 2 ===
1. "Time Machine" - 8:46
2. "Cool #9" - 6:06
3. "Andalusia" 6:49
4. "Bass Solo" (Stuart Hamm) - 6:31
5. "Cryin'" - 6:42
6. "The Mystical Potato Head Groove Thing" - 5:53
7. "Always with Me, Always with You" - 9:01
8. "Surfing with the Alien" - 6:16
9. "Crowd Chant" - 3:27
10. "Summer Song" - 8:05

== Personnel ==
- Joe Satriani – guitar, vocals
- Galen Henson – rhythm guitar
- Stuart Hamm – bass
- Jeff Campitelli – drums

== Charts ==
Chart performance for Live in Paris
| Chart (2010) | Peak position |
|---|---|
| Argentine Music DVD (CAPIF) | 20 |
| Australian Music DVD (ARIA) | 29 |
| Dutch Music DVD (MegaCharts) | 12 |
| French Albums (SNEP) | 197 |
| Greek Albums (IFPI) | 20 |
| Portuguese Music DVD (AFP) | 7 |
