= Rhythm of Time =

Studio album by Jordan Rudess
- Released: August 31, 2004
- Genre: Progressive rock
- Length: 59:33
- Label: Magna Carta
- Producer: Jordan Rudess

Jordan Rudess chronology
Christmas Sky (2002)	Rhythm of Time (2004)	Prime Cuts (2006)

Professional ratings
Review scores
Source	Rating
AllMusic	3.5/5 stars

Rhythm of Time is an album by Jordan Rudess recorded and released in 2004.

In order to create the album before he went on tour with Dream Theater in 2004, Rudess lived in complete seclusion from the rest of the world for 14 days. With no telephone, e-mail, or other social contact, Rudess only spoke to his family and his personal assistant.

The initial printing run of the United States version of the album contained a bonus CD-ROM section. This section included audio tracks featuring Rudess singing the parts that Kip Winger would later fill in and a video "The Making of 'The Rhythm of Time'."

"Ra" is said to have been inspired by Jordan Rudess' life.

== Track listing ==
All pieces are composed by Jordan Rudess.

1. "Time Crunch" – 6:30
2. "Screaming Head" – 7:22
3. "Insectsamongus" – 9:36
4. "Beyond Tomorrow" – 9:59
5. "Bar Hopping with Mr. Picky" – 4:39
6. "What Four" – 6:53
7. "Ra" – 7:56
8. "Tear Before the Rain" – 6:36

== Personnel ==
=== Musicians ===
- Jordan Rudess – keyboards
- Greg Howe – guitar (4, 6)
- Joe Satriani – guitar (2, 3)
- Steve Morse – guitar (5, 6)
- Vinnie Moore – guitar (1, 7)
- Daniel Jakubovic – guitar (4)
- Dave LaRue – bass guitar
- Rod Morgenstein – drums
- Bill Ruyle – tabla
- Kip Winger – vocals on "Beyond Tomorrow" and "Tear Before the Rain"

=== Production ===
- Arranged and produced by Jordan Rudess
- Recorded and engineered by John Huth and Dani Koesterich
- Mixed by John Huth
- Mastered by Jim Brick
