= Strange Beautiful Music =

Studio album by Joe Satriani
- Released: June 25, 2002
- Recorded: Early 2002
- Studios: The Plant in Sausalito, California; Studio 21 in San Francisco
- Genre: Instrumental rock
- Length: 60:22
- Label: Epic
- Producers: Joe Satriani, Eric Caudieux, John Cuniberti

Joe Satriani chronology
Live in San Francisco (2001)	Strange Beautiful Music (2002)	G3: Rockin' in the Free World (2004)

Singles from Strange Beautiful Music
- 1. "Starry Night" Released: June 10, 2002

Strange Beautiful Music is the ninth studio album by guitarist Joe Satriani, released on June 25, 2002, through Epic Records; a Super Audio CD edition was released on September 10. The album reached No. 140 on the United States Billboard 200 and remained on that chart for a week, as well as reaching the top 100 in four other countries.

"Starry Night" was released as a single on June 10 and received a nomination for Best Rock Instrumental Performance at the 2003 Grammy Awards, Satriani's twelfth such nomination.

The title Strange Beautiful Music is also the name of Satriani's publishing company, as well as a lyric from "Third Stone from the Sun", a song by Jimi Hendrix, whom Satriani has cited as his main inspiration to start playing the guitar in his youth.

== Release and tour ==
Recording for Strange Beautiful Music began in January 2002 and the title was announced on March 25. Worldwide touring began in Europe in July, followed by North America from August to September, East Asia in October, additional dates in North America from November through to February 2003, Central America in March, and concluding in South America in April.

== Critical reception ==
Professional ratings
Review scores
Source	Rating
AllMusic	3/5 stars

Mike Gowan of AllMusic praised Satriani’s ability to combine technical guitar playing with melody and strong hooks, while noting that ‘‘Strange Beautiful Music’’ incorporates world music influences and elements of techno. He highlighted “Belly Dancer” for its combination of rock riffs, Middle Eastern-influenced melodies and rapid guitar passages, and “Oriental Melody” for its use of delay and keyboards. Gowan also praised the catchy melody of “New Last Jam”, but felt that the album did not match the pop brilliance of ‘‘Surfing with the Alien’’. He described the album as inconsistent, arguing that the experimental approach worked effectively on some tracks but less successfully on others. He was critical of “Chords of Life”, which he felt combined disparate musical elements awkwardly, and considered “Starry Night” a less successful attempt to recreate the qualities of “Always with Me, Always with You”.

== Track listing ==
All music is composed by Joe Satriani, except where noted.

No.	Title	Length
1.	"Oriental Melody"	3:56
2.	"Belly Dancer"	5:02
3.	"Starry Night"	3:55
4.	"Chords of Life"	4:13
5.	"Mind Storm"	4:12
6.	"Sleep Walk" (Santo Farina, Johnny Farina)	2:46
7.	"New Last Jam"	4:19
8.	"Mountain Song"	3:31
9.	"What Breaks a Heart"	5:20
10.	"Seven String"	4:02
11.	"Hill Groove"	4:10
12.	"The Journey"	4:09
13.	"The Traveler"	5:39
14.	"You Saved My Life"	5:02
Total length:		60:22

Bonus tracks
No.	Title	Length
15.	"The Eight Steps"	5:44
16.	"Slick"	3:41

== Personnel ==
- Joe Satriani – guitar, banjo, keyboard (tracks 11, 14), sitar, autoharp (track 2), bass, engineering, mixing, production
- Robert Fripp – Frippertronics (track 6)
- Eric Caudieux – keyboard (track 4), digital editing, production
- Jeff Campitelli – drums, percussion (track 14)
- Gregg Bissonette – drums (track 2)
- John Cuniberti – percussion (tracks 1, 2, 5, 10, 11), engineering, mixing, production
- Matt Bissonette – bass
- Pia Vai – harp (track 4)
- Justin Phelps – engineering assistance, digital editing
- Bernie Grundman – mastering

== Charts ==
Chart (2002)	Peak position
Dutch Albums (Album Top 100)	84
French Albums (SNEP)	38
German Albums (Offizielle Top 100)	92
Italian Albums (FIMI)	33
Swiss Albums (Schweizer Hitparade)	78
UK Rock & Metal Albums (Official Charts)	14
US Billboard 200	140

== Awards ==
Event	Title	Award	Result
2003 Grammys	"Starry Night"	Best Rock Instrumental Performance	Nominated
