= The Elephants of Mars =

Studio album by Joe Satriani
- Released: April 8, 2022
- Studios: Chateau Faf, Acton, CA; Studio 21, San Francisco, CA; Sweetwater Studios, Agua Dulce, CA; Uncommon Studios, Los Angeles, CA; The Apex Studio, Los Angeles, CA; Various locations in Australia and Tasmania
- Genre: Instrumental rock
- Length: 66:31
- Label: earMUSIC
- Producer: Eric Caudieux

Joe Satriani chronology
Shapeshifting (2020)	The Elephants of Mars (2022)

Singles from The Elephants of Mars
- 1. "Sahara" Released: January 19, 2022; 2. "Faceless" Released: February 18, 2022; 3. "Pumpin'" Released: March 18, 2022

The Elephants of Mars is the eighteenth studio album by guitarist Joe Satriani, released on April 8, 2022, by earMUSIC. It is Satriani's first release with earMUSIC. The album was ranked as the 7th best guitar album of 2022 by Guitar World readers.

== Album Concept ==
As part of the creative process Satriani stated he wanted to make sure he wrote the best songs with arrangements that were ‘super creative’, while wanting some more interesting sounds, and that meant really concentrating on the meaning behind every song. He had started writing a song with a curious noise that made him think of an alien elephant like creature with musical powers. He developed this into a story where Earth scientists terraform Mars, creating a beautiful garden planet. By accident they create gigantic telepathic elephants that can play music with their trunks. Wanting to form an independent Mars the elephants team up with the colonists to fight the corporations of Earth who are stripping Mars of its’ resources.

== Recording ==
Due to the COVID-19 pandemic Satriani and his bandmates could not convene at a single studio to record the album, instead recording each part remotely from their own homes and personal studios.

“So I was getting Rai’s keyboard stuff from Australia. Ned [Evett] was in Galveston, Texas, when he did the voiceover for us. And the other guys are in the general LA area but travelling. Kenny Aronoff is travelling around the world all the time. So it was very interesting putting the record together that way and giving all of us that carte blanche to just relax and apply ourselves more than we would if we had that tight three-hour session time.”

Every guitar part on the album was recorded in Satriani’s home studio, direct input using a SansAmp plugin, made by Avid in the mid 90’s. Satriani tried using traditional amps but every time the band put one against the other, the SansAmp version won. The only pedals used were a TC Sub ‘N’ Up (Octaver) and a wah-wah. Delays, flangers and phasers were all done with plugins, or Greg Koller (mixer and masterer) using outboard gear. Koller also had Les Paul’s very own 1176 limiter that he ran all the guitars through.

== Song Writing ==
Satriani spoke across numerous interviews about the background, writing and recording process of some of the songs from the album.

Sahara was originally written with a story and lyrics about a guy who was lost in an urban environment and feels like he is in a spiritual desert so he can’t find anybody. Satriani used 12 string electric guitars, playing microtonal bends to create a “sexy rhythmic vibe”. The song moved to being an instrumental, with the melody reflecting the mantra of the lyrics ‘Everything is going to be alright’. Eric Caudieux added influences from North Africa to india, fleshing the song out with interesting textures around the clean guitar before Satriani’s “total Hendrix octave guitar takes over”.

The Elephants of Mars is about giant sentient elephants roaming a newly terraformed Mars. Although the track took years to put together, the solo was completed in a single take. Satriani plugged into a Palmer signal splitter, sending the left channel through the SansAmp, and the right through an Electro-Harmonix Micro Q-Tron, with phasing between the channels giving a martian charm and the distinctive elephant sound.

Faceless. Satriani was reacting to normal situations in life where you feel misunderstood as a person. He saw people in the pandemic outside with face coverings, he thought they felt unseen, nobody knew their unique personalities, and this created loneliness. The person playing the guitar is trying to reach out and say ‘I want you to see me, I’m somebody special’. the solo section is a moment of hope in the song, before returning to the minor key of despair as the person goes back to feeling faceless.

Blue Foot Groovy is about a guy strutting his stuff, feeling good, and trying to sell himself to a potential partner. It started out as ‘Blue Foot’, Satriani had Sammy Hagar in mind to sing it as they had been talking about simplifying songs, but it ended up as an instrumental on this album, with everybody telling him to name it Blue Foot Groovy.

The Doors of Perception. Inspiration came from the idea that the more you open the doors of perceiving the world, you let good and bad in, so scary and wonderful things. The song purposely ends on a strange eerie questioning riff. It was recorded using Satriani’s Martin Guitar, multilayered with his Ibanez JSA.

E 104th St. NYC 1973, this is the area that Satriani’s father grew up in, and Satriani would visit throughout his childhood to visit grandparents. 1973 was chosen as the mid point between Satriani visiting as a little kid, to when he was a young adult, a time when he would play guitar in the local clubs to the early hours of the morning. This was the inspiration he drew on when improvising a demo live take that played over a dual drum beat, one straight, one swinging.

Dance of the Spores. Satriani had an idea that all the world’s troubles are always on our mind, but at microscopic level there is life, and the spores are having the time of their lives at a circus party in a forest at night. He recorded the breakdown section on guitar and piano, including very prominent pizzicato strings, expecting his producer to lose them in the final mix. Instead, Caudieux kept everything, adding in a Bulgarian orchestra and a Mexican horn band to produce a song Satriani found fantastical and magical.

Through a Mother’s Day Darkly. “I recorded that track really fast. I pulled out my JS6 signature prototype that was turned into a seven-string. I hadn’t played it in years; it had been in its case, and the strings were never changed. They were so loose because they’d lost their tension, but I found that interesting. I just wrote the song based on that tactile response and the fact that it was such a weird Mother’s Day, in lockdown.”

Desolation, which came from a really dark feeling, is about someone going through a total spiritual and emotional crisis. It’s from two different perspectives, someone who knows they’re dying, and someone who is sitting there saying goodbye. Satriani admitted he didn’t know what, or how, to play the song, he just kept coming back each day and improvising “until the moment happened”.

== Critical reception ==
Professional ratings
Review scores
Source	Rating
AllMusic	3.5/5 stars
Classic Rock	4.5/5 stars
Dansende Beren	4/5 stars

The Elephants of Mars received generally positive reviews from music critics, who widely praised the album's experimental nature and melodic depth.

Writing for Classic Rock, Grant Moon gave the album a highly favorable review, declaring it Satriani's "strongest album since 1998's Crystal Planet". Moon observed that the 14 tracks showcased the guitarist "totally in the zone," praising his playing as being at its "most beautiful, experimental and fiery.". The review particularly highlighted the "spine-tingling melodies" on songs such as "Faceless," "22 Memory Lane," and "Desolation," alongside the "stylish and consummate" ventures into funk and jazz rock.

Bart Van Goethem of Belgian music publication Dansende Beren awarded the album four out of five stars, commending the composition process born out of pandemic-induced isolation. He noted that the lack of studio deadlines allowed Satriani to record entirely without compromise, resulting in a record where he essentially "reinvented himself.". Though Van Goethem felt the 14-track runtime was slightly too long to sustain its stratospheric quality consistently, he lauded individual tracks like "Tension and Release" for its funky 7/4 riff and "Desolation" for its impressive, opera-soprano guitar phrasing.

Fred Thomas of AllMusic gave the record three and a half out of five stars, describing it as a "warped, fantastical, and often fun-loving" body of work. He noted that while the COVID-19 pandemic had slowed down the recording process, “the extra time he took to completely explore every idea makes the album more interesting and offers a deeper look into the guitar god’s psyche.” Thomas commended the album's rapid stylistic shifts, specifically pointing to how tracks like "Sailing the Seas of Ganymede" combined multi-tracked leads to give his guitar a rich, synth-like character that successfully merged space-age funk with high-level technical execution.

== Track listing ==
All music is composed by Joe Satriani, except where noted.

No.	Title	Music	Length
1.	"Sahara"	Satriani; Eric Caudieux	4:36
2.	"The Elephants of Mars"	Satriani; Caudieux	5:21
3.	"Faceless"		4:48
4.	"Blue Foot Groovy"		5:09
5.	"Tension and Release"		5:49
6.	"Sailing the Seas of Ganymede"		5:58
7.	"Doors of Perception"		3:17
8.	"E 104th St NYC 1973"		5:36
9.	"Pumpin'"		3:22
10.	"Dance of the Spores"		6:19
11.	"Night Scene"		4:33
12.	"Through a Mother's Day Darkly"	Satriani; Caudieux; Ned Evett	4:12
13.	"22 Memory Lane"		4:11
14.	"Desolation"	Satriani; Caudieux	3:20
Total length:			66:31

== Personnel ==
- Joe Satriani – guitar, keyboards
- Kenny Aronoff – drums
- Bryan Beller – bass
- Rai Thistlethwayte – keyboards
- Eric Caudieux – keyboards
- Eduardo Pena Dolhun – portrait photography
- Ned Evett – composer, spoken word
- Todd Gallopo – art direction, design, photo illustration
- Greg Koller – mastering, mixing

== Charts ==
Chart (2022)	Peak position
Austrian Albums (Ö3 Austria)	64
Belgian Albums (Ultratop Flanders)	107
Belgian Albums (Ultratop Wallonia)	38
French Albums (SNEP)	64
German Albums (Offizielle Top 100)	22
Dutch Albums (Album Top 100)	46
Spanish Albums (Promusicae)	49
Swiss Albums (Schweizer Hitparade)	5
US Top Album Sales (Billboard)	15
US Top Rock Albums (Billboard)	44
US Top Hard Rock Albums (Billboard)	11
