= Shapeshifting (Joe Satriani album) =

2020 studio album by Joe Satriani

Studio album by Joe Satriani
- Released: April 10, 2020
- Studios: PLYRZ Studios, Valencia, CA, US
- Genres: Instrumental rock, hard rock, blues rock
- Length: 46:23
- Label: Sony Music
- Producers: Jim Scott; Joe Satriani

Joe Satriani chronology
What Happens Next (2018)	Shapeshifting (2020)	The Elephants of Mars (2022)

Shapeshifting is the seventeenth studio album by American guitarist Joe Satriani, released on 10 April 2020 through Sony Music. Co-produced by Satriani and Jim Scott, the album explores a variety of musical styles, incorporating elements of rock, blues, jazz and world music. Satriani conceived the record around the idea of adapting his playing and songwriting to different musical approaches rather than fitting each composition into his established sound.

Recorded at Scott’s PLYRZ Studio in Valencia, California, the album features drummer Kenny Aronoff, bassist Chris Chaney and keyboardist Eric Caudieux, with additional contributions from pianist Lisa Coleman and mandolin player Christopher Guest. The lead single, ‘Nineteen Eighty’, was released ahead of the album.

Shapeshifting received generally positive reviews from music critics, who praised its melodic songwriting, musicianship and stylistic diversity, although some reviewers criticised its production and perceived inconsistencies. Amongst other international chart positions the album reached number 6 on the Swiss Albums Chart. Released during the COVID-19 pandemic, it was Satriani’s final album for Sony Music before he moved to earMUSIC for his 2022 album The Elephants of Mars.

== Album concept ==
Satriani explained the concept in an interview with Tommy Marz at Sound Vapors. In a contrarian moment he thought instead of deciding how an album would be produced and what style of music it was, what if he approached the opposite way. Thinking about the old mythological shape shifting people turning into other people or animals, he thought

“what if I, in a partly humorous but sci-fi way, thought about myself changing my musical style to make every song happen instead of changing the song to make it fit with the Joe Satriani style.”

This propelled him to writing in different areas creating a “mind expanding and emotionally fun journey” through the album. He stated that the freedom this gave both him and the band, added energy to the project.

== Recording ==
The album was recorded at Jim Scott’s PLYRZ Studio in Valencia, California. Satriani had not worked with Scott before, but linked up with him after a recommendation from Kenny Aronoff. Satriani was touring with Aronoff on the Experience Hendrix tour and had invited him to work on the album (which he was already writing). The band, consisting of Satriani, Aronoff, Chris Chaney, and Eric Caudieux, found a 10 day window spanning August to September (2019) when they could all get together in the studio to record. Satriani moved to Valencia for a couple of months to complete recording and co-production. In an interview with Guitariste, a French language website, Satriani gave a comprehensive list of the gear he used when recording the album:

Guitars:

- 2018 Ibanez JS1CR #3 and #2
- 2010 Ibanez JS2410 MCO Prototype #1
- 2016 Fender Custom Shop ‘63 Red Sparkle Telecaster
- 2019 Fender Custom Shop ‘50s Relic Violin Burst Telecaster
- 2015 Fender Custom Shop 1969 Stratocaster Firemist Gold
- 1969 Gibson Les Paul Custom – original
- 1997 Gibson Custom Shop Reissue Les Paul “Plain Top”
- 2012 Gibson Custom Shop ‘59 Les Paul Reissue Aged Historic with Bigsby Tailpiece
- 2014 Martin HD D28E Retro
- 2008 Gibson Custom Shop Reissue ‘58 Gold Top
- 2010 Gibson Custom Shop Reissue 335 Block ‘63 Reissue Antique Faded Cherry
- 1989 Deering 6 String Banjo

Pedals:

- TC Sub N Up
- VOX BBW Wah Wah
- VOX Time Machine Delay
- MXR Dyna Comp
- MXR EP3
- MXR Flanger
- EVH117 Flanger
- EVH Phaser
- Vemuram Jan Ray

Amps and cabinets:

- Marshall ‘14 JVM410HJS Head – #2
- Marshall ‘71 JMP50 Tremolo 50watt Head
- Marshall ‘71 Super Lead 100watt Head
- Marshall ‘69 Super Lead 100watt Head
- Marshall ‘18 JCM 25/50 2555X Silver Jubilee Head
- Marshall ‘69 4 x 12 Cabinet with original 25watt Greenback speakers
- Marshall ‘10 1960B 4 x 12 Cabinet with 75watt speakers
- Peavey ‘92 5150 Head – #2
- KSR Orthos
- Fender ‘65 Princeton Reissue
- Fender ‘68 Custom Princeton Reverb
- Fender ‘68 Custom Deluxe Reverb
- Fender ‘65 Deluxe Reverb Reissue
- Fender ‘64 Custom Deluxe Reverb Handwired
- Fender ‘57 Bandmaster 3 x 10 Combo Reissue
- Fender 1967 Dual Showman Head
- Fender 1966 Bassman Head (Jim’s)
- Fender 1966 Tremolux Head (Jim’s)
- Fender 1967 Bandmaster Head (Jim’s)
- Fender 1967 Vibratone Rotating Speaker (Jim’s)
- Fender ‘03 FM 212R Combo (Jim’s)
- Roland 1985 JC120 Combo

== Release during pandemic ==
In several interviews, Satriani discussed the recording and release of the album during the coronavirus pandemic. He told Ultimate Classic Rock

“We were all pretty innocent, we didn’t know what was coming. We were making it when this crisis was just beginning to get started. But everybody made the record, we all traveled, we finished it. This is beyond catastrophic for all the people who work in the business.”

Speaking to Guitar website he went into detail regarding the release and the cancellation of the Shapeshifting world tour. He had an honest conversation with Sony where they agreed to put out the album as planned. Satriani had already spent close to $100,000 on travel arrangements for the tour. Promoters around the world delayed making decisions for as long as possible, as venues were refusing to issue refunds unless their governments declared a pandemic. Satriani said that France held out the longest, but eventually everything had to be cancelled. He then had to work with organisers to reschedule the tour, telling Sound Vapors he was able to move most of the European tour forward exactly a year.

== Songs ==
In a 2021 interview with Music Radar, Satriani discussed the inspiration and recording process behind each track:

"Shapeshifting" was written to introduce the idea that every song would be musically and stylistically different “so get ready”.

"Big Distortion" was performed with the attitude of a group of friends hanging out in a clubhouse looking for the most enjoyable thing to play. Some of the studio techs and engineers were drafted in for hand clapping to build the fun. Satriani told Guitar World that the riff that opens the song was the kind he loved playing in his high school bands.

"All For Love" originally written in the 1990s as an orchestral piece, then given to John Paul Jones in 2001 when the pair were talking about an orchestral collaboration which never happened. Satriani re-discovered the demo, managing with difficulty, to adapt the song for guitar.

"Ali Farka, Dick Dale, An Alien, And Me" the song originated from a synthesizer sequence Satriani had developed while writing music for his sci-fi project Crystal Planet. He thought it had a North African vibe, and when he played guitar alongside it he adopted the style of Ali Farka. He intended the song to be a tribute to Farka, but with the death of Dick Dale Satriani began imagining himself playing the song with both musicians at a late night party in an African oasis, with the synthesizer representing the alien.

"Teardrops" drummer Kenny Aronoff was given a demo of this track by Satriani, with minimal drums. This allowed him the space and freedom to express the drums tonal sounds. During mixing, Jim Scott removed some of the guitar parts to enhance the track’s dynamics.

"Perfect Dust" inspired by the poem "Mexico City Blues" by Jack Kerouac which contains the phrase ‘perfect dust’. Satriani visualised being in a cemetery, below ground the dead have no worries and are partying, above ground the bereaved are sad at the loss of loved ones. The song was written around those two parts.

"Nineteen Eighty" Satriani wrote the song to capture the enthusiasm he felt at the beginning of 1980, when he was a member of the Squares. He wanted it to be fun, evoking Eddie Van Halen, Mark Knopfler, Brian May, and AC/DC, before the guitar scene became ‘shreddy’ later in the decade

"All My Friends Are Here" started life as a demo that Satriani hoped everyone on the team would respond to. When he gave it to Eric Caudieux he immediately wanted to change some of the keyboard parts to make them more transparent. Satriani welcomed Caudieux's suggestions, praising the keyboardist's “enormous amount of good taste”.

"Spirits, Ghosts and Outlaws" came from the idea of Nicolas Cage being chased through the desert at night by spirits and outlaws. For Satriani, the song needed to feel like it was always moving forward very fast into some unknown territory but maintain a good spiritual feeling.

"Falling Stars" was based on a set of dreams Satriani had, he explained:

“Things in the dream didn’t go together and I kept hearing in my mind this major chord and this minor chord, two separate things, and then I was feeling like it is a song that isn’t quite sure if it is night or day, if it’s light or dark, and represented by the two chord changes. The song really is trying to put music, to create a soundtrack, to this dream..”

"Waiting" Satriani was full of praise for Lisa Coleman’s piano on this track, saying he couldn’t make his albums without the talent and support of those around him.

"Here The Blue River" inspired by reading the poem "The River" by Ralph Waldo Emerson Satriani began thinking of his childhood and visiting places in nature with his parents. This reflection guided him towards the pace of the song, and without setting out to make a reggae track, he ended up with one.

"Yesterday’s Yesterday" Satriani said he loved the idea of doing something acoustic, and started off writing the melody on his Deering banjo. Wanting some Mandolin on the track he sent it off to his friend Christopher Guest a.k.a Nigel Tufnel who sent him a couple of options. Lisa Coleman subsequently added piano. The song lifted everybody’s spirits, and somewhere down the line they started whistling along with it.

== Critical reception ==
Professional ratings
Review scores
Source	Rating
AllMusic	4/5 stars
Apocalypse Later Music Reviews	6/10 stars
Classic Rock	3/5 stars
Sea of Tranquility	4/5 stars
Sonic Perspectives	8/10 stars

Shapeshifting received generally positive reviews from music critics. AllMusic’s Thom Jurek rated the album four out of five stars, praising Satriani’s songwriting and his ability to combine different musical styles, dynamics and forms of expression. Classic Rock critic Polly Glass gave the album three out of five stars, describing it as a thoughtful and well-produced record and highlighting Satriani’s use of blues, rock, world music and jazz influences, but added that the album was unlikely to attract many new listeners to Satriani’s music.

Alan Cox of Sonic Perspectives gave the album 8/10, praising its stylistic variety and Satriani’s emphasis on melody and songwriting. Cox wrote that the album moves between different musical approaches while retaining accessibility, although he considered “Yesterday’s Yesterday” one of its weaker tracks. Pete Pardo of Sea of Tranquility awarded the album four out of five stars, praising its memorable compositions, musicianship and stylistic variety, but felt that the album became less engaging towards its conclusion and questioned the broader appeal of instrumental guitar music in 2020.

A more critical assessment came from Hal C. F. Astell of Apocalypse Later Music Reviews, who rated the album 6/10. Astell praised Satriani’s technical ability and the variety of styles explored, but criticised the highly produced sound, which he felt made the album feel artificial and constrained the spontaneity of Satriani’s playing.

== Track listing ==
All tracks are written by Joe Satriani.

No.	Title	Length
1.	"Shapeshifting"	3:54
2.	"Big Distortion"	4:13
3.	"All for Love"	2:31
4.	"Ali Farka, Dick Dale, an Alien and Me"	3:42
5.	"Teardrops"	4:08
6.	"Perfect Dust"	3:30
7.	"Nineteen Eighty"	3:34
8.	"All My Friends Are Here"	3:24
9.	"Spirits, Ghosts and Outlaws"	3:22
10.	"Falling Stars"	3:41
11.	"Waiting"	2:36
12.	"Here the Blue River"	5:01
13.	"Yesterday's Yesterday"	2:47
Total length:		46:23

== Personnel ==
- Joe Satriani – guitars, banjo, keyboards, whistling, handclaps
- Chris Chaney – bass guitar, rhythm guitar (track 10)
- Eric Caudieux – keyboards, percussion, whistling, handclaps, editing, sound designing
- Kenny Aronoff – drums
- Lisa Coleman – piano (tracks 11 and 13)
- Christopher Guest – mandolin (track 13)
- Jim Scott – percussion, whistling, handclaps, producing, recording, mixing
- John Cuniberti – mastering

== Charts ==
Chart performance for Shapeshifting
Chart (2020)	Peak position
Australian Albums (ARIA)	28
Belgian Albums (Ultratop Wallonia)	151
Czech Albums (ČNS IFPI)	89
French Albums (SNEP)	101
German Albums (Offizielle Top 100)	61
Hungarian Albums (MAHASZ)	28
Polish Albums (ZPAV)	38
Portuguese Albums (AFP)	16
Scottish Albums (Official Charts)	4
Swiss Albums (Schweizer Hitparade)	6
UK Albums (Official Charts)	70

== See also ==
- List of 2020 albums
