= Super Colossal =

Studio album by Joe Satriani
- Released: March 14, 2006
- Recorded: Late 2005 – early 2006 at Studio 21 in San Francisco; Armoury Recording Studios in Vancouver
- Genre: Instrumental rock
- Length: 58:53
- Label: Epic
- Producers: Joe Satriani, Mike Fraser

Joe Satriani chronology
G3: Live in Tokyo (2005)	Super Colossal (2006)	Satriani Live! (2006)

Super Colossal is the eleventh studio album by guitarist Joe Satriani, released on March 14, 2006, through Epic Records. The album reached No. 86 on the U.S. Billboard 200 and remained on that chart for two weeks, as well as reaching the top 100 in three other countries. Super Colossal was nominated for Best Rock Instrumental Performance at the 2007 Grammy Awards, Satriani's thirteenth such nomination.

== Release and touring ==
Recording for Super Colossal began around September 2005 and the title was announced on February 2, 2006. Touring began in North America from March to May 2006, followed by Europe from June to July.

== Overview ==
Satriani provides detailed explanations of the story behind each track in the album's liner notes. "Crowd Chant" was originally going to be named "Party on the Enterprise" with sampled sounds of the Enterprise spacecraft from the Star Trek series. However, prior to the album's release, Satriani explained on a podcast that he was unable to acquire the legal rights to use the samples, choosing instead to replace them with his own sounds and rename the track. "Crowd Chant"'s ending theme was inspired by composer Gabriel Fauré's "Pavane in F-sharp minor, Op. 50".

"Crowd Chant" is used by various American football teams after touchdowns. It is also a popular goal song for ice hockey teams, most notably the Minnesota Wild and the New York Islanders of the NHL. It was later featured on the soundtrack to the 2009 video game NHL 2K10, while a cover version appears in Madden NFL 11. The MLB Network TV series Quick Pitch used the song as its opening theme but replaced it with Fitz and the Tantrums's song "HandClap" in 2017.

== Critical reception ==
Professional ratings
Review scores
Source	Rating
AllMusic	3.5/5 stars

Rob Theakston at AllMusic gave Super Colossal 3.5 stars out of 5, saying that Satriani "doesn't pull any new tricks out of his bag, but lets his fingers do the talking throughout most of the record." The title track was described as "big and booming", with an instantly recognizable tone and delivery. "It's So Good" was likened to Flying in a Blue Dream (1989) and Steve Vai's 1990 album Passion and Warfare, while the final track, "Crowd Chant", was criticized as being "painfully out of place" despite its catchiness.

== Track listing ==
All music is composed by Joe Satriani.

No.	Title	Length
1.	"Super Colossal"	4:14
2.	"Just Like Lightnin'"	4:01
3.	"It's So Good"	4:14
4.	"Redshift Riders"	4:50
5.	"Ten Words"	3:28
6.	"A Cool New Way"	6:13
7.	"One Robot's Dream"	6:16
8.	"The Meaning of Love"	4:34
9.	"Made of Tears"	5:32
10.	"Theme for a Strange World"	4:39
11.	"Movin' On"	4:05
12.	"A Love Eternal"	3:33
13.	"Crowd Chant"	3:14
Total length:		58:53

== Personnel ==
- Joe Satriani – guitar, keyboard, bass, engineering, production
- Jeff Campitelli – drums (except tracks 6–9), percussion (except tracks 6–9)
- Simon Phillips – drums (tracks 6–9), engineering
- Eric Caudieux – editing, sound design
- Mike Fraser – engineering, mixing, production
- Rob Stefanson – engineering assistance
- Stephan Nordin – engineering assistance
- George Marino – mastering

== Charts ==
Chart (2006)	Peak position
Dutch Albums (Album Top 100)	89
French Albums (SNEP)	86
Italian Albums (FIMI)	97
Scottish Albums (Official Charts)	94
Swiss Albums (Schweizer Hitparade)	83
UK Rock & Metal Albums (Official Charts)	4
US Billboard 200	86
US Top Internet Albums (Billboard)	12

== Awards ==
Event	Title	Award	Result
2007 Grammys	Super Colossal	Best Rock Instrumental Performance	Nominated
