= What Happens Next (Joe Satriani album) =

Studio album by Joe Satriani
- Released: January 12, 2018
- Studios: Sunset Sound, Los Angeles; The Foot Locker, San Francisco; Studio 21
- Genre: Instrumental rock
- Length: 51:17
- Label: Sony Music
- Producer: Mike Fraser

Joe Satriani chronology
Shockwave Supernova (2015)	What Happens Next (2018)	Shapeshifting (2020)

What Happens Next is the sixteenth studio album by the American guitarist Joe Satriani, released on January 12, 2018, through Sony Music's Legacy Recordings. Produced by Mike Fraser, the album features a power-trio lineup of Satriani on guitar, Glenn Hughes on bass, and Chad Smith on drums. Described by Satriani as an "anti-concept" album, it marked a return to a more direct rock sound, drawing on his early influences rather than the elaborate conceptual approach of his preceding releases.

The album received generally positive reviews from music critics, with reviewers praising the musicianship, energy, and interplay between the three performers. What Happens Next charted internationally, reaching number 42 on the US Billboard 200 and number 40 on the UK Albums Chart.

== Background ==
Following the release of Shockwave Supernova (2015), Satriani sought to move away from the elaborate arrangements and conceptual approach of his preceding albums. He described What Happens Next as an "anti-concept", explaining that he wanted to return to his earliest influences in rock and soul music rather than develop another elaborate narrative. He also aimed for a simpler, more direct sound built around a power trio, featuring bassist Glenn Hughes and drummer Chad Smith.

Satriani explained that the album's title originated in a question he had repeatedly asked himself during the year before recording: "What happens next?" He described the phrase as an internal voice that continued to recur while he was writing the music. When he completed the song of the same name, he realized that the title could serve as his answer to the question: what happened next was the album itself. He therefore removed the question mark, turning the phrase into an ambiguous statement that he hoped would prompt listeners to reflect on its meaning for themselves.

Mike Fraser produced the album and also handled the recording and mixing, with sessions taking place at Sunset Sound in Los Angeles and Satriani's studio, the Foot Locker, in San Francisco.

== Release and promotion ==
What Happens Next was released on January 12, 2018, through Sony's Legacy Recordings. Speaking to Guitar World in February 2018, Satriani shared details on the songwriting and recording process. On the album as a whole, he stated:

"I wanted everything to hit hard but still have those unexpected 'oh, wow!' moments", "And more importantly, I wanted it to sound like three crazy musicians making noise together. I have to give my producer, Mike Fraser, a lot of credit. He gave us just enough room to go nuts, but he always kept his eye on the original idea of each song."

The album's release coincided with a new series of G3 concerts. The tour was announced alongside the album in September 2017 and featured Satriani with John Petrucci of Dream Theater and Phil Collen of Def Leppard in North America. In Europe, the lineup included Petrucci and former Scorpions guitarist Uli Jon Roth.

In a January 2018 interview with Westword, Satriani revealed that the album had been completed in mid-May of the previous year, and he recalled that the recording sessions with Hughes and Smith at Sunset Sound had taken seven days. He also explained that his touring band had rehearsed around half of the album, with the intention of performing at least six new songs during the G3 shows.

== Critical reception ==
Professional ratings
Review scores
Source	Rating
AllMusic	3.5/5 stars
Classic Rock	3.5/5 stars
Modern Drummer	Positive

In a review for Classic Rock, Philip Wilding praised What Happens Next for its virtuosity, energy, and dynamic range, highlighting the tracks "Cherry Blossoms", "Righteous", and "Headrush". He considered the addition of bassist Glenn Hughes and drummer Chad Smith particularly effective, writing that the trio brought cohesion and energy to the album.

Stephen Thomas Erlewine of AllMusic awarded the album three and a half out of five stars. He noted that Satriani moved away from the progressive, space-themed approach of his preceding albums, while retaining heavy riffs and elaborate instrumental passages. Erlewine praised the balance between intense rock and more restrained material, observing that the musician's use of space and swing gave the music a liveliness that distinguished it from straightforward hard rock.

Modern Drummer reviewed the album from the perspective of Smith's drumming in its September 2018 issue, praising his forceful playing on the opening track, "Energy", and highlighting his contributions to "Headrush" and "Super Funky Badass". It described the album as a powerful example of the rock trio format, commending Smith's combination of groove, intensity, and an intentionally unpolished feel.

== Track listing ==
All tracks are written by Joe Satriani.

No.	Title	Length
1.	"Energy"	3:27
2.	"Catbot"	3:38
3.	"Thunder High on the Mountain"	4:46
4.	"Cherry Blossoms"	4:29
5.	"Righteous"	3:34
6.	"Smooth Soul"	3:51
7.	"Headrush"	3:35
8.	"Looper"	3:43
9.	"What Happens Next"	4:24
10.	"Super Funky Badass"	7:35
11.	"Invisible"	4:11
12.	"Forever and Ever"	4:04
Total length:		51:17

== Personnel ==
- Joe Satriani – guitar, keyboards, programming, additional recording
- Glenn Hughes – bass
- Chad Smith – drums

=== Additional personnel ===
- Eric Caudieux – sound designer, digital editing
- Mike Fraser – producing, recording, engineering, mixing
- Adam Ayan – mastering
- Geoff Neal – Sunset Sound assistant engineering
- Jaimeson Durr – the Foot Locker assistant engineering
- Hayden Watson – assistant engineering, mixing
- Zach Blackstone – assistant engineering, mixing
- Joseph Cultice – photography
- Todd Gallopo – art direction, design
- TJ River – design

== Charts ==
Chart (2018)	Peak position
Australian Albums (ARIA)	20
Austrian Albums (Ö3 Austria)	53
Belgian Albums (Ultratop Flanders)	75
Belgian Albums (Ultratop Wallonia)	93
Canadian Albums (Billboard)	45
Czech Albums (ČNS IFPI)	18
Dutch Albums (Album Top 100)	61
Finnish Albums (Suomen virallinen lista)	50
French Albums (SNEP)	56
German Albums (Offizielle Top 100)	51
Hungarian Albums (MAHASZ)	26
Italian Albums (FIMI)	74
Japanese Albums (Oricon)	74
New Zealand Heatseeker Albums (RMNZ)	4
Polish Albums (ZPAV)	22
Portuguese Albums (AFP)	36
Scottish Albums (Official Charts)	22
Spanish Albums (Promusicae)	33
Swiss Albums (Schweizer Hitparade)	9
UK Albums (Official Charts)	40
US Billboard 200	42
