= Black Swans and Wormhole Wizards =

Studio album by Joe Satriani
- Released: October 5, 2010
- Recorded: June–August 2010
- Studio: Skywalker Sound (Nicasio); Studio 21 (San Francisco)
- Genre: Instrumental rock, progressive rock
- Length: 53:12
- Label: Epic
- Producer: Joe Satriani, Mike Fraser

Joe Satriani chronology
Live in Paris: I Just Wanna Rock (2010)	Black Swans and Wormhole Wizards (2010)	Satchurated: Live in Montreal (2012)

Singles from Black Swans and Wormhole Wizards
- 1. "Light Years Away" Released: September 7, 2010

Black Swans and Wormhole Wizards is the thirteenth studio album by guitarist Joe Satriani, released on October 5, 2010 through Epic Records.

== Release and touring ==
Recording for Black Swans and Wormhole Wizards took place between June and August 2010 and the title was announced on August 20. A podcast of each track was put up on Satriani's official Facebook profile and YouTube channel leading up to the album's release, with "Light Years Away" being released as a free MP3 single download on September 7, 2010 in exchange for the customer advertising it in a Facebook post or Twitter tweet. Two bonus tracks, "Heartbeats" and "Longing", were made available through Best Buy and Napster.

Touring began in Europe from October to November, followed by North America in December to January 2011.

== Critical reception ==
Professional ratings
Review scores
Source	Rating
AllMusic	3/5 stars

Stephen Thomas Erlewine at AllMusic gave Black Swans and Wormhole Wizards three stars out of five, calling it "a mature work from one of the great rock guitarists" and "pure guitar prog, filled with compressed boogies, sci-fi synths, exotic flourishes, and all of Satch's phasers and flangers in full-tilt overdrive."

The album reached No. 45 on the U.S. Billboard 200 and remained on that chart for two weeks, as well as reaching the top 100 in ten other countries.

== Track listing ==
All music is composed by Joe Satriani.

No.	Title	Length
1.	"Premonition"	3:52
2.	"Dream Song"	4:48
3.	"Pyrrhic Victoria"	5:08
4.	"Light Years Away"	6:11
5.	"Solitude"	0:57
6.	"Littleworth Lane"	3:46
7.	"The Golden Room"	5:19
8.	"Two Sides to Every Story"	4:10
9.	"Wormhole Wizards"	6:27
10.	"Wind in the Trees"	7:42
11.	"God Is Crying"	4:52
Total length:		53:12

Best Buy edition bonus tracks
No.	Title	Length
12.	"Heartbeats"	3:25
13.	"Longing"	3:55

== Personnel ==
- Joe Satriani – guitar, keyboard, bass, engineering, production
- Mike Keneally – keyboard
- Jeff Campitelli – drums, percussion
- Allen Whitman – bass
- Mike Fraser – engineering, mixing, production
- Mike Boden – engineering, digital editing
- Dann Michael Thompson – engineering assistance
- Judy Kirschner – engineering assistance
- Eric Mosher – additional editing, mixing
- George Marino – mastering

== Charts ==
Chart performance for Black Swans and Wormhole Wizars
Chart (2010)	Peak position
Australian Albums (ARIA)	84
Austrian Albums (Ö3 Austria)	65
Belgian Albums (Ultratop Flanders)	77
Belgian Albums (Ultratop Wallonia)	65
Croatian International Albums (HDU)	32
Czech Albums (ČNS IFPI)	33
Dutch Albums (Album Top 100)	32
French Albums (SNEP)	39
German Albums (Offizielle Top 100)	85
Italian Albums (FIMI)	35
Scottish Albums (OCC)	54
Swiss Albums (Schweizer Hitparade)	34
UK Albums (OCC)	62
US Billboard 200	45
US Independent Albums (Billboard)	7
US Top Hard Rock Albums (Billboard)	5
US Top Rock Albums (Billboard)	14
US Indie Store Album Sales (Billboard)	23
