= Engines of Creation (album) =

Studio album by Joe Satriani
- Released: March 14, 2000
- Recorded: 1999
- Studio: Chateau FAF, Los Angeles; Avatar, New York City
- Genre: Instrumental rock; electronica; techno
- Length: 53:27
- Label: Epic
- Producer: Joe Satriani, Eric Caudieux, Kevin Shirley

Joe Satriani chronology
Crystal Planet (1998)	Engines of Creation (2000)	Live in San Francisco (2001)

Singles from Engines of Creation
- 1. "Until We Say Goodbye" Released: 2000

Engines of Creation is the eighth studio album by guitarist Joe Satriani, released on March 14, 2000, through Epic Records. The album reached No. 90 on the U.S. Billboard 200 and remained on that chart for three weeks, as well as reaching the top 100 in three other countries. "Until We Say Goodbye" was released as a single and received a nomination for Best Rock Instrumental Performance at the 2001 Grammy Awards, Satriani's tenth such nomination.

== Release and tour ==
Mixing for Engines of Creation took place in June–July 1999 and the title was revealed on December 13. A limited edition EP, Additional Creations, was released free of charge alongside the album in some stores. Worldwide touring began in the U.S. in April–May 2000, followed by Europe in June–July, Central and South America in August, and concluding in the U.S. in December.

== Style and composition ==
In a unique and notable departure from Satriani's usual style, Engines of Creation mainly features experimentation with electronic and techno music rather than the straightforward instrumental rock heard on his previous albums; Satriani has described the album as "completely techno." With the exception of "Until We Say Goodbye", all tracks were made using guitars recorded and mixed non-traditionally on computer platforms, as well as being digitally manipulated using synthesizers and computer software.

== Critical reception ==
Professional ratings
Review scores
Source	Rating
AllMusic	3/5 stars

Steve Huey at AllMusic gave Engines of Creation three stars out of five, calling it "the biggest stylistic shift [Satriani has] made yet" and "a brave and sporadically successful experiment". He suggested that longtime fans of Satriani's regular material may be disappointed, as well as those who dislike electronic sounds in guitar-based music, but praised Satriani for challenging himself to "find ways of coaxing totally new sounds from his guitar", and that "his melodies and main themes have rarely been this angular and off-kilter, meaning that exploring this music has indeed helped Satriani refresh and re-imagine his signature sound."

== Track listing ==
All music is composed by Joe Satriani.

No.	Title	Length
1.	"Devil's Slide"	5:10
2.	"Flavor Crystal 7"	4:26
3.	"Borg Sex"	5:27
4.	"Until We Say Goodbye"	4:31
5.	"Attack"	4:22
6.	"Champagne?"	6:04
7.	"Clouds Race Across the Sky"	6:14
8.	"The Power Cosmic 2000-Part I"	2:09
9.	"The Power Cosmic 2000-Part II"	4:23
10.	"Slow and Easy"	4:44
11.	"Engines of Creation"	5:57
Total length:		53:27

== Personnel ==
- Joe Satriani – guitar, keyboard, programming, arrangement, production
- Eric Caudieux – keyboard, programming, bass, arrangement, editing, engineering, mixing, production
- Anton Fig – drums
- Pat Thrall – bass
- Enrique Gonzalez – engineering assistance
- Mike Pilar – engineering assistance
- Mike Fraser – mixing
- Howie Weinberg – mastering
- Kevin Shirley – production

== Charts ==
Chart (2000)	Peak position
Dutch Albums (Album Top 100)	79
French Albums (SNEP)	37
Swiss Albums (Schweizer Hitparade)	86
UK Albums (OCC)	78
UK Rock & Metal Albums (OCC)	6
US Billboard 200	90

== Sales ==
Region	Certification	Certified units/sales
United States	—	111,851

== Awards ==
Event	Title	Award	Result
2001 Grammys	"Until We Say Goodbye"	Best Rock Instrumental Performance	Nominated
