= Joe Satriani (album) =

1995 album by Joe Satriani

Studio album by Joe Satriani
- Released: October 1995
- Recorded: The Site; H.O.S. Recording; Coast Recorders in San Francisco; Fantasy Studios in Berkeley, California
- Genre: Instrumental rock, blues rock
- Length: 60:18
- Label: Relativity
- Producer: Glyn Johns

Joe Satriani chronology
Time Machine (1993)	Joe Satriani (1995)	G3: Live in Concert (1997)

Singles from Joe Satriani
- 1. "Look My Way" Released: 1995; 2. "(You're) My World" / "If" / "Slow Down Blues" Released: 1995; 3. "Luminous Flesh Giants" Released: 1996

Professional ratings
Review scores
Source	Rating
AllMusic	2.5/5 stars

Joe Satriani is the sixth studio album by guitarist Joe Satriani, released in October 1995 through Relativity Records. This was his last album for Relativity, as he would switch record labels to Epic (or Sony Music) for his next eleven albums. Joe Satriani reached No. 51 on the U.S. Billboard 200 and remained on that chart for seven weeks, as well as reaching the top 100 in four other countries. "(You're) My World" was released as a single, reaching No. 30 on Billboard's Mainstream Rock chart and receiving a nomination for Best Rock Instrumental Performance at the 1997 Grammy Awards, Satriani's seventh such nomination.

== Overview ==
The album is a slight departure from Satriani's previous instrumental rock stylings, instead showcasing a more laid back, blues-laden sound with less reliance on effects and overdubs. Recorded in the space of a few weeks, Satriani also relinquished his usual production duties to Glyn Johns (of Led Zeppelin, The Who and The Rolling Stones fame). "S.M.F." stands for "Sick Mother Fucker".

== Reissues ==
Joe Satriani has been reissued twice. The first was on June 16, 2008, as part of the Original Album Classics box set, and most recently as part of The Complete Studio Recordings, released on April 22, 2014, through Legacy Recordings; this is a box set compilation containing remastered editions of every Satriani studio album from 1986 to 2013.

== Track listing ==
All tracks are written by Joe Satriani.

No.	Title	Length
1.	"Cool #9"	6:00
2.	"If"	4:49
3.	"Down, Down, Down"	6:13
4.	"Luminous Flesh Giants"	5:55
5.	"S.M.F."	6:43
6.	"Look My Way"	4:01
7.	"Home"	3:27
8.	"Moroccan Sunset"	4:23
9.	"Killer Bee Bop"	3:48
10.	"Slow Down Blues"	7:25
11.	"(You're) My World"	3:56
12.	"Sittin' 'Round"	3:38
Total length:		60:18

== Personnel ==
- Joe Satriani – vocals, guitar, Dobro, harp, bass (track 11)
- Andy Fairweather Low – guitar (tracks 1–5, 7–10, 12)
- Eric Valentine – piano (track 1), keyboard, percussion (track 4), bass (track 4), engineering (tracks 1, 4, 6)
- Manu Katché – drums (tracks 1–3, 5, 7–10, 12)
- Ethan Johns – drums (track 4)
- Jeff Campitelli – drums (track 11)
- Gregg Bissonette – percussion (track 6)
- Nathan East – bass (tracks 1–3, 5, 7–10, 12)
- Matt Bissonette – bass (track 6)
- Steve Holroyd – engineering (tracks 1–5, 7–10, 12)
- John Cuniberti – engineering (tracks 4, 6, 7, 11)
- Kevin Scott – engineering assistance (tracks 1–10, 12)
- Rhoades Howe – engineering assistance (tracks 4, 6)
- Stephen Hart – engineering assistance (tracks 7, 11)
- Bob Ludwig – mastering
- Glyn Johns – mixing, production

== Charts ==
Chart (1995)	Peak position
Australian Albums (ARIA)	72
Dutch Albums (Album Top 100)	66
Finnish Albums (Suomen virallinen lista)	34
French Albums (SNEP)	10
New Zealand Albums (RMNZ)	27
Scottish Albums (OCC)	36
Swiss Albums (Schweizer Hitparade)	36
UK Albums (OCC)	21
US Billboard 200	51

== Sales ==
Sales for Joe Satriani
Region	Certification	Certified units/sales
United States	—	256,422

== Awards ==
Event	Title	Award	Result
1997 Grammys	"(You're) My World"	Best Rock Instrumental Performance	Nominated
