= Joe Satriani =

American guitarist (born 1956)

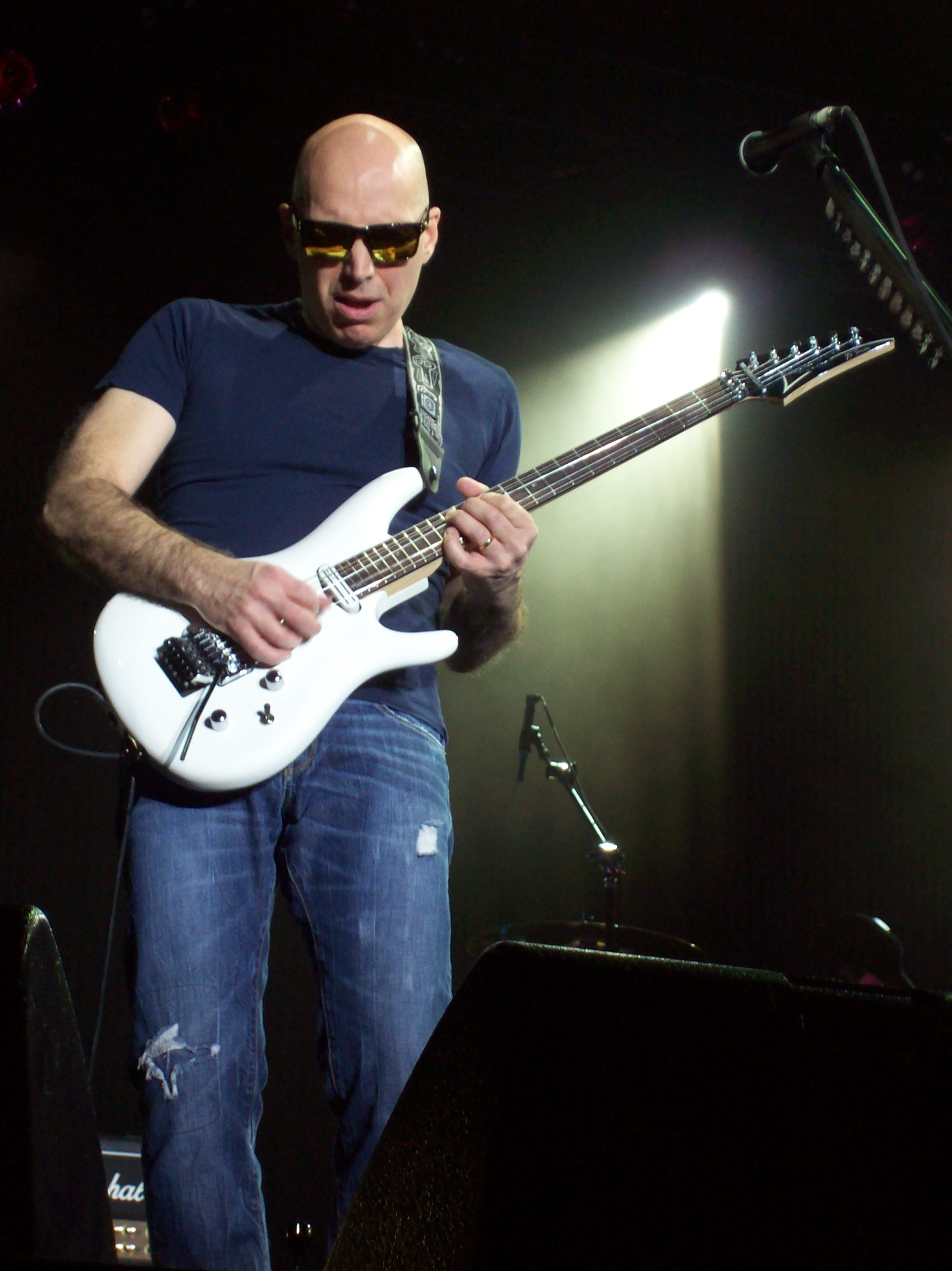
- Satriani performing in 2010

Background information
- Also known as: Satch
- Born: Joseph Satriani; July 15, 1956 (age 70); Westbury, New York, U.S.
- Genres: Instrumental rock; hard rock; blues rock
- Occupations: Musician; songwriter; composer; guitar instructor; producer
- Instruments: Guitar
- Works: Discography
- Years active: 1978–present
- Labels: Epic; Relativity
- Member of: G3; Chickenfoot; SATCHVAI Band
- Formerly of: Deep Purple; The Greg Kihn Band
- Website: satriani.com

Joseph Satriani (born July 15, 1956) is an American rock guitarist, composer, record producer, and songwriter. Early in his career, he worked as a guitar instructor, with many of his former students achieving fame, including Steve Vai, Larry LaLonde, Rick Hunolt, Kirk Hammett, Andy Timmons, Charlie Hunter, Kevin Cadogan, and Alex Skolnick. Satriani went on to have a successful solo music career, starting in the mid-1980s. He is a 15-time Grammy Award nominee and has sold over ten million albums, making him the bestselling instrumental rock guitarist of all time.

In 1988, Satriani was recruited by Mick Jagger as lead guitarist for his first solo tour. Satriani briefly toured with Deep Purple, joining shortly after the second departure of Ritchie Blackmore, in 1993. He has worked with a range of guitarists during the G3 tour, which he founded in 1995. Satriani has been the guitarist for the supergroup Chickenfoot since joining the band in 2008.

== Early life ==
Satriani was born to an Italian-American family in Westbury, New York. His paternal grandparents were from Piacenza and Bobbio, while his maternal grandparents were from Bari. He was raised Roman Catholic. He was inspired to play guitar at age 14, after hearing of the death of Jimi Hendrix. Satriani heard the news during football practice, where he then announced to his coach that he was quitting to become a guitarist.

Satriani graduated from Carle Place High School. In 1974, he studied music with jazz guitarist Billy Bauer and with reclusive jazz pianist Lennie Tristano. The technically demanding Tristano greatly influenced Satriani's playing. He began teaching guitar, with his most notable student at the time being fellow Long Island native Steve Vai (who also went to Carle Place). While he was teaching Vai, he was attending Five Towns College for studies in music. In 1978, Satriani moved to Berkeley, California, to pursue a music career. Soon after, he resumed teaching. His students included Kirk Hammett of Metallica, David Bryson of Counting Crows, Kevin Cadogan of Third Eye Blind, Larry LaLonde of Primus and Possessed, Alex Skolnick of Testament, Rick Hunolt (ex-Exodus), Phil Kettner of Lȧȧz Rockit, Geoff Tyson of T-Ride, Charlie Hunter, and Emit Bloch.

== Career ==
=== 1980s–2000 ===
Satriani started playing in a San Francisco-based band called Squares, which he formed with his brother-in-law Neil Sheehan in the late 1970s. He was later invited to join the Greg Kihn Band, who were on the downside of their career, but whose generosity helped Satriani pay off the overwhelming credit card debt from recording his first album, Not of This Earth, released in 1986. The same year, he also sang backing vocals on the self-titled Crowded House album.

In 1987, Satriani's second album, Surfing with the Alien, produced radio hits and was the first all-instrumental release to chart so highly in many years. The track "Crushing Day" was featured on the soundtrack of a low-budget film titled It Takes Two. Also in 1987, Satriani helped produce the EP The Eyes of Horror for the death metal band Possessed. The following year, he released his second EP, titled Dreaming #11, which featured the song "The Crush of Love". In 1989, Satriani issued the album Flying in a Blue Dream. It was said to be inspired by the death of his father, who died in 1989 during the recording of the album. "One Big Rush" featured on the soundtrack to the Cameron Crowe movie Say Anything.... "The Forgotten Part II" was featured on a Molson Dry commercial in Canada in 1993. "Can't Slow Down" featured in a car chase sequence in the Don Johnson-starring show Nash Bridges.

In 1992, Satriani released The Extremist, his most commercially successful album to date. The album was certified Gold in the United States and peaked at number 22 on the Billboard 200. Radio stations across the US picked up "Summer Song", which got a major boost when Sony used it in a major commercial campaign for their Discman portable CD players. "Cryin'", "Friends", and the title track were regional hits on radio. In late 1993, Satriani joined Deep Purple as a temporary replacement for departed guitarist Ritchie Blackmore during the band's Japanese tour. The concerts were a success, and Satriani was asked to join the band permanently, but he declined, having just signed a multi-album solo deal with Sony, and Steve Morse took the guitarist slot in Deep Purple.

In 1996, Satriani founded G3, a concert tour intended to include a rotating trio of guitarists. The original lineup featured Satriani, Steve Vai, and Eric Johnson. The G3 tour has continued periodically since its inaugural version, with Satriani the only permanent member. Other guitarists who have performed in G3 include Yngwie Malmsteen, John Petrucci, Kenny Wayne Shepherd, Robert Fripp, Andy Timmons, Uli Jon Roth, Michael Schenker, Adrian Legg, Paul Gilbert, Steve Morse, and Steve Lukather. In 1998, Satriani recorded and released Crystal Planet, followed by Engines of Creation, one of his more experimental works featuring the electronica genre. Two shows at the Fillmore West in San Francisco were recorded in December 2000 and released as Live in San Francisco, a two-disc live album and DVD.

=== 2000–present ===
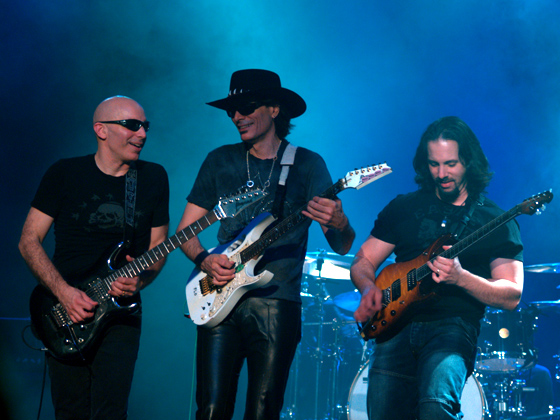
Satriani with Steve Vai (center) and John Petrucci (right) as part of G3 in Melbourne, 2006.

Satriani released Strange Beautiful Music in 2002 and Is There Love in Space? in 2004. In May 2005, the musician toured India for the first time, playing concerts in Delhi, Kolkata, and Mumbai. In 2006, he recorded and released Super Colossal and Satriani Live!, another two-disc live album and DVD recorded May 3, 2006, at the Grove in Anaheim, California. In 2006, Satriani signed on as an official supporter of Little Kids Rock, a nonprofit organization that provides free musical instruments and instruction to children in underserved public schools throughout the US. The artist has personally delivered instruments to children in the program through a charity raffle for the organization, and like Steve Vai, sits on its board of directors as an honorary member. On August 7, 2007, Epic/Legacy Recordings re-released Surfing with the Alien to celebrate the 20th anniversary of its publication. This was a two-disc set that includes a remastered album and a DVD of a never-before-seen live show filmed at the Montreux Jazz Festival in 1988. Satriani's next album, Professor Satchafunkilus and the Musterion of Rock, was released on April 1, 2008. On May 29, 2008, Satriani revealed that he was joining hard rock supergroup Chickenfoot, composed of former Van Halen members Sammy Hagar and Michael Anthony, and Red Hot Chili Peppers drummer Chad Smith. They released their debut, self-titled album on June 5, 2009. A second album, titled Chickenfoot III, followed on September 27, 2011. On December 4, 2008, he filed a copyright infringement suit against Coldplay in the United States District Court for the Central District of California. Satriani's suit claims that the band's song "Viva la Vida" includes "substantial original portions" of the Satriani song "If I Could Fly" from his 2004 album, Is There Love in Space? The Coldplay song in question received two Grammy Awards. Coldplay denied the allegation. The case was dismissed in September 2009, with each party paying their own trial costs.

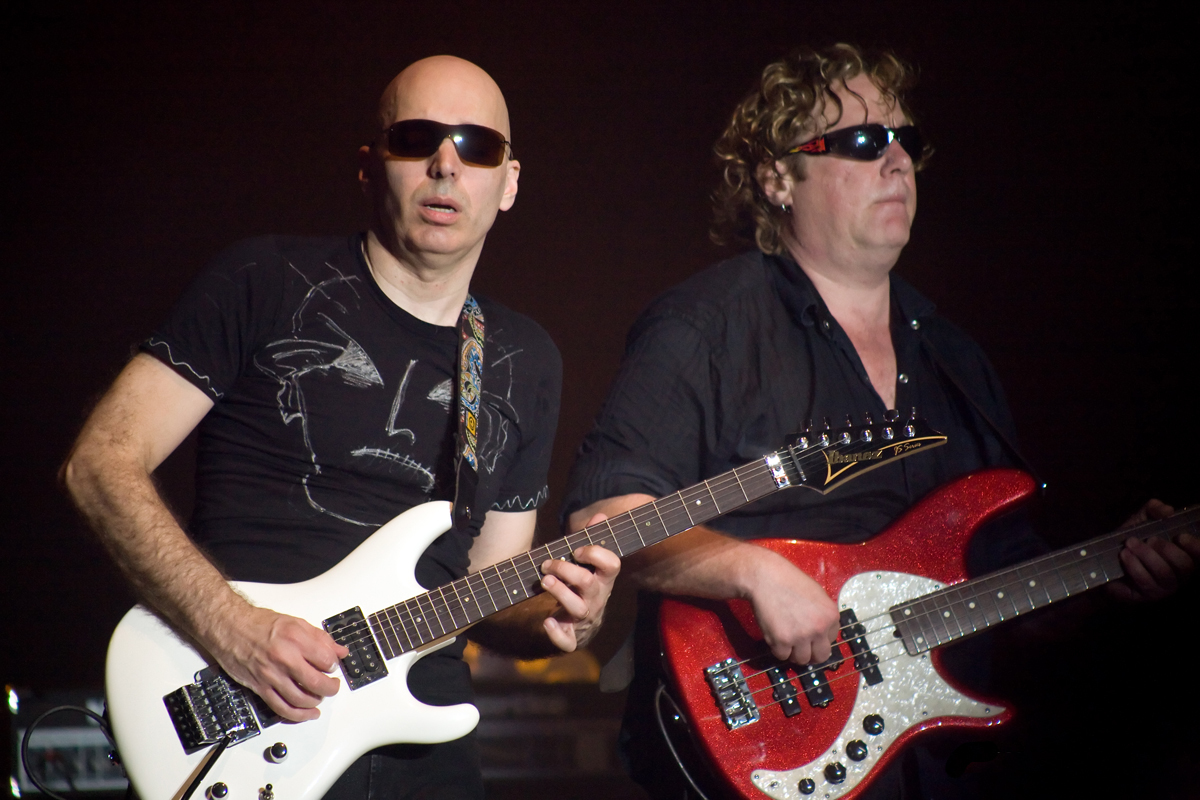
Satriani with Stuart Hamm in the Rijnhal, Arnhem, 2008

The artist released a live DVD recording of a concert in Paris titled Live in Paris: I Just Wanna Rock and a companion two-CD set on February 2, 2010. In March 2010, he participated with other guitarists in the Experience Hendrix Tribute Tour, performing music written and inspired by Jimi Hendrix. In May 2010, Satriani announced he was about to enter the studio to record a new album, and dates were released for an autumn tour. He also said that demos had been recorded for a second Chickenfoot record. Satriani released his 13th studio album, Black Swans and Wormhole Wizards, on October 5, 2010. He issued the DVD/Blu-ray of his three-dimensional concert film Satchurated: Live in Montreal on April 24, 2012, after its limited showing in theaters. The film was shot in December 2010 in Montreal and was directed by award-winning filmmakers François and Pierre Lamoureux. Satchurated 3D is the first Blu-ray concert film available with Dolby TrueHD 7.1. On May 7, 2013, Satriani released his 14th studio album, titled Unstoppable Momentum. A career retrospective box set titled Joe Satriani: The Complete Studio Recordings, which contains remastered editions of every studio album from Not of This Earth to Unstoppable Momentum was released on April 22, 2014. A book titled Strange Beautiful Music: A Memoir was also published, to coincide with the release of the box set.

In August 2014, Satriani participated in the G4 Experience—a weeklong guitar camp—with fellow guitarists Paul Gilbert and Andy Timmons, and keyboardist Mike Keneally. In February 2015, the first dates were announced for the Shockwave World Tour, in support of Satriani's 15th studio album, slated for release in July. Shockwave Supernova was released on July 24, 2015. The album was conceived after Satriani found himself playing guitar with his teeth a lot during the Unstoppable Momentum tour, and had a daydream about an alter ego, "Shockwave Supernova", making him do it. On September 16, 2017, Satriani teased his upcoming 16th studio album, What Happens Next, through social media. The album was released on January 12, 2018. He collaborated with former Deep Purple bassist Glenn Hughes and Red Hot Chili Peppers drummer Chad Smith, two Rock and Roll Hall of Fame members.

On April 5, 2019, the guitarist released an eponymous retrospective collection of songs he had recorded in the 1970s with his band Squares. The following April, he published his seventeenth solo album, Shapeshifting. On January 19, 2022, Satriani released "Sahara" as the first single from his eighteenth album, The Elephants of Mars. The record was released on April 8, 2022, by earMUSIC, making it Satriani's first since his 1995 self-titled album to be released by a label other than Epic Records or its parent company, Sony Music. In late 2022, Satriani announced a continuation of his G3 touring project, under the title G4 Experience V6.0, which took place on January 3–7, 2023. The event was led by Satriani, together with Peter Frampton—among his final performances before retirement, Steve Lukather, and Steve Morse, and included workshops and jam sessions led by Alex Skolnick, Andy James, Cory Wong, Eric Gales, John 5, Mateus Asato, and Nili Brosh.

In early 2024, Satriani, Steve Vai, and Eric Johnson embarked on a limited-run "Reunion" tour of the original G3 lineup. Subsequently, Satriani and Vai continued touring as a double bill under the name SATCHVAI. After more than fifty years of professional and personal friendship, the pair wrote and recorded their first single together, "The Sea of Emotion, Pt.1", which was released on March 29, 2024. In December 2025, it was announced that Animals as Leaders would support SATCHVAI on their 2026 North American tour.

=== Chickenfoot ===
In May 2008, Satriani joined hard rock supergroup Chickenfoot, composed of former Van Halen members Sammy Hagar and Michael Anthony, and Red Hot Chili Peppers drummer, Chad Smith. The band features Hagar on vocals, Satriani on guitar, Anthony on bass, and Smith on drums. Their eponymous debut album was released on June 5, 2009. The first single and video released was the track "Oh Yeah", which was played on The Tonight Show with Conan O'Brien on June 5, 2009. Satriani received a co-writing credit on all the songs on the band's debut album. Broken Records magazine asked Satriani about his new band, and he enthusiastically mentioned, "it was great fun" and it gives him a "kick in the music bone" to play with such great talent. He said it felt natural to step back and play more rhythm than solo guitar. Chickenfoot's second album, Chickenfoot III, was released on September 27, 2011. The album's first single was the track "Bigfoot".

=== Other work ===
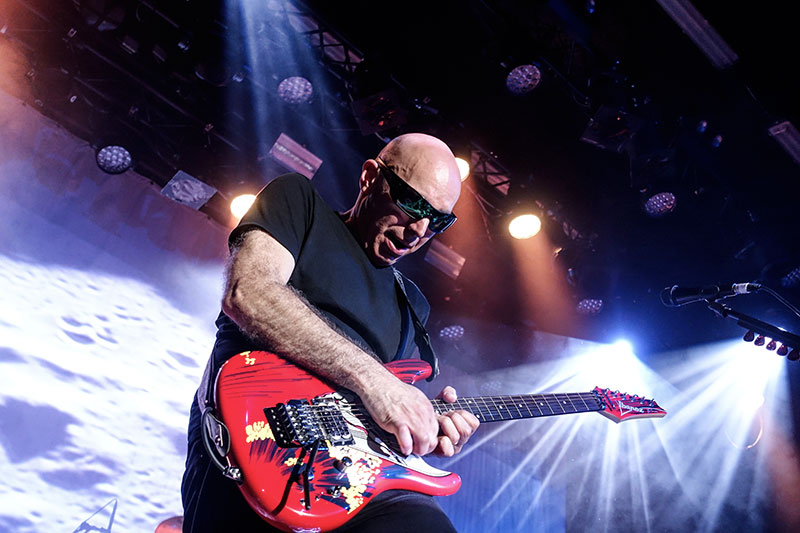
Satriani performing in Aarhus, 2016

Satriani is credited on many other records, including on Blue Öyster Cult's 1988 album, Imaginos, Alice Cooper's 1991 album, Hey Stoopid, Spinal Tap's 1992 album, Break Like the Wind, and on band members Stu Hamm and Gregg Bissonette's solo works. He was credited with singing backing vocals on the 1986 debut album by Crowded House. In 2003, he played lead guitar on the Yardbirds's release Birdland. In 2006, he made appearances on tracks for Deep Purple vocalist Ian Gillan's solo CD/DVD dual disc, Gillan's Inn.

On Dream Theater's 2007 album, Systematic Chaos, Satriani contributed spoken lyrics to the song "Repentance". He also contributed a guitar solo to Jordan Rudess' 2004 solo release, Rhythm of Time. He composed much of the soundtrack for the racing video game NASCAR 06: Total Team Control, while his song "Crowd Chant" was featured in NHL 2K10 and Madden NFL 11. In 2009, he played two characters in season three of Adult Swim's Metalocalypse. Satriani has starred in several movies, including the 2006 Christopher Guest film For Your Consideration, as the guitarist in the band that played for the late-night show. He appeared as himself in the film Moneyball, playing "The Star-Spangled Banner". The American Dad! episode "Why Can't We Be Friends" featured the song "Always with Me, Always with You". The song was also sampled in the Nicki Minaj single "Right Thru Me". Satriani joined Chickenfoot in voicing themselves in the Aqua Teen Hunger Force episode "IAMAPOD".

== Style and influence ==
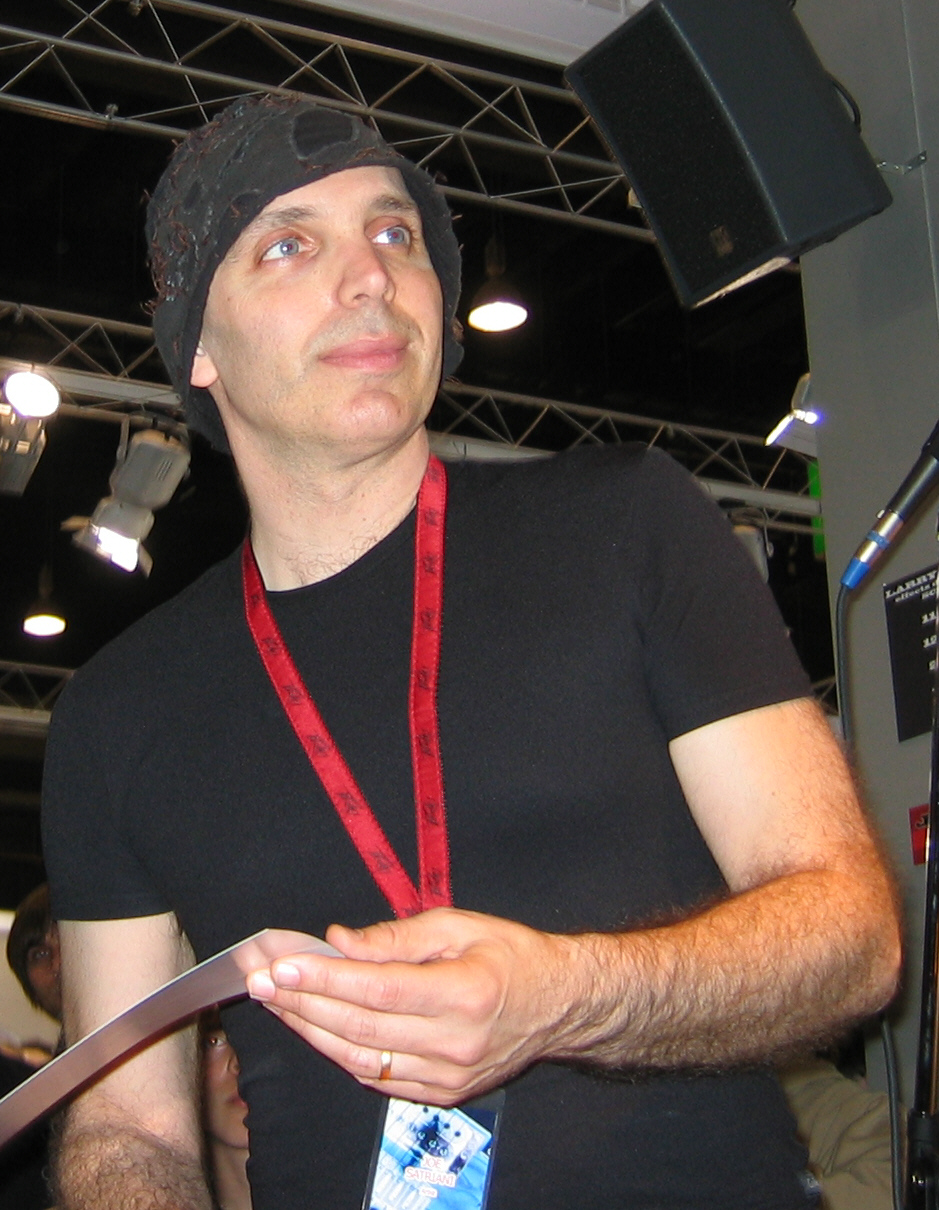
Satriani in 2004

Satriani is considered a highly technical guitarist, and has been referred to as a top guitar virtuoso. He has mastered many playing techniques on electric guitar, including legato, two-handed tapping and arpeggio tapping, volume swells, harmonics, and extreme whammy bar effects. During fast passages, Satriani favors a legato technique (achieved primarily through hammer-ons and pull-offs) that yields smooth and flowing runs. He is also adept at other speed-related techniques such as rapid alternate picking and sweep picking.

Satriani was influenced by Jimi Hendrix and by English rock guitarists such as Brian May, Eric Clapton, Jimmy Page, Ritchie Blackmore, and Jeff Beck. He was also influenced by jazz fusion guitarist Allan Holdsworth.

== Equipment ==
Satriani endorses Ibanez's JS Series guitars and the Marshall JVM410HJS amplifier. Both lines were designed specifically for him as signature products. The Ibanez JS1 (the original JS model) was based on, and replaced, the Ibanez 540 Radius model that Satriani first endorsed. Many of his guitars are made by the company, including the JS1000 and JS1200. These guitars typically feature the DiMarzio PAF Pro (which he used up until 1993 in both the neck and bridge positions), the DiMarzio Fred (which he used in the bridge position from 1993 to 2005), and the Mo' Joe and the Paf Joe (which he has used in the bridge and neck positions from 2005 to the present). He has more recently introduced the Satch Track single-coil pickup that he used in his humbucker/single coil-equipped signature Ibanez guitars. He has since replaced the Satch Track with the Sustainiac.

The JS line of guitars is Satriani's signature line, with the JS1000, JS1200, JS2400, JSBDG, and JS20th using Ibanez's original Edge double-locking tremolo bridge. The JS100 and JS120s both use Ibanez's Edge 3 tremolo bridge. The JS1600 is a fixed-bridge guitar with no tremolo system. The guitar he was most associated with during the 1990s was a chrome-finished guitar nicknamed "Chrome Boy". This instrument can be seen on the Live in San Francisco DVD. However, the guitar used for most of the concert was in fact a lookalike nicknamed "Pearly", which featured Seymour Duncan Pearly Gates pickups.

Satriani uses a number of other JS models, such as the JS double neck model, JS700 (primary axe on his self-titled CD, seen on the 1995 Joe Satriani tour, which features a fixed bridge, P-90 pickups, and a matching mahogany body and neck), JS6/JS6000 (natural body), JS1 (the original JS model), JS2000 (fixed-bridge model), a variety of JS100s, JS1000s and JS1200s with custom paint work, and a large number of prototype JSs. All double-locking bridges have been the original Edge tremolo, not the newer models, which point to a more custom guitar than the off-the-shelf models. Satriani played a red 7-string JS model, seen in the G3 Live in Tokyo DVD from 2005. He also has a prototype 24-fret version of the JS, now called the JS–2400, which he has used with Chickenfoot. He has also used other prototypes featuring a Sustainiac or a JS model with three single coil-sized humbucker pickups.

Satriani has used a wide variety of guitar amps, with Marshalls being his main amplifier (notably the limited-edition blue-colored 6100 LM model) up until 2001, and his Peavey signature series amps, the Peavey JSX, up until his time with Chickenfoot.

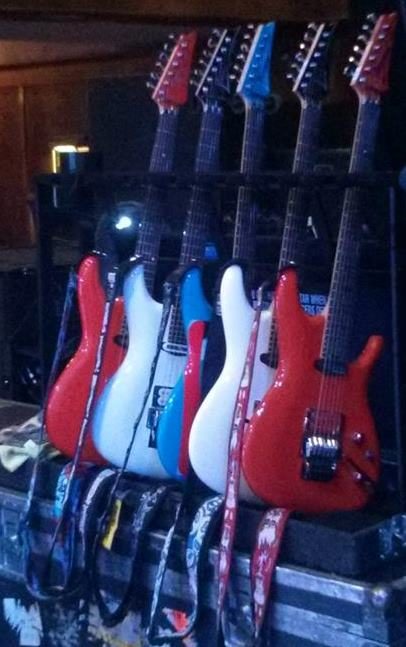
Guitars used by Satriani during the 2013 Unstoppable Momentum tour

The JSX began life as a prototype Peavey XXX and developed into the Joe Satriani signature Peavey model. However, Satriani still used distortion pedals with the clean channel rather than the built-in overdrive channels. He has used other amplifiers over the years in the studio, such as the Peavey 5150 (used to record the song "Crystal Planet"), Cornford, and the Mesa/Boogie Mark IIC+ (used to record the song "Flying in a Blue Dream"), among others. He later switched to the Marshall JVM series, having used a modified JVM 410H in his Black Swans and Wormhole Wizards tour in 2010 and with Chickenfoot in 2010 and 2011.

These modified JVM Marshall amps were prototypes for a signature amp that Marshall scheduled for release in 2011. They replaced the reverb with noise gates that eliminate lag when switching channels. The clean channel was replaced by the clean channel of a 6100 LM model, which Satriani likes as an option to use distortion pedals with. The orange overdrive channel and the modern red overdrive channel have been better matched with each other as Satriani claims to prefer the organic overdrive of the JVM over pedals. The red overdrive channel was modified for a beefy rock rather than a nu metal sound. The effect loop has been simplified to be serial only.

Satriani has used many amps in the studio when recording, including the Peavey Classic. He used Marshall heads and cabinets, including live, prior to his Peavey endorsement. Recently, he used the JSX head through a Palmer Speaker Simulator. He has released a Class-A 5-watt tube amp called the "Mini Colossal". In 2009, Satriani split from Peavey and returned to using Marshall amps. Live, he has been using a Marshall JVM410JS since 2009.

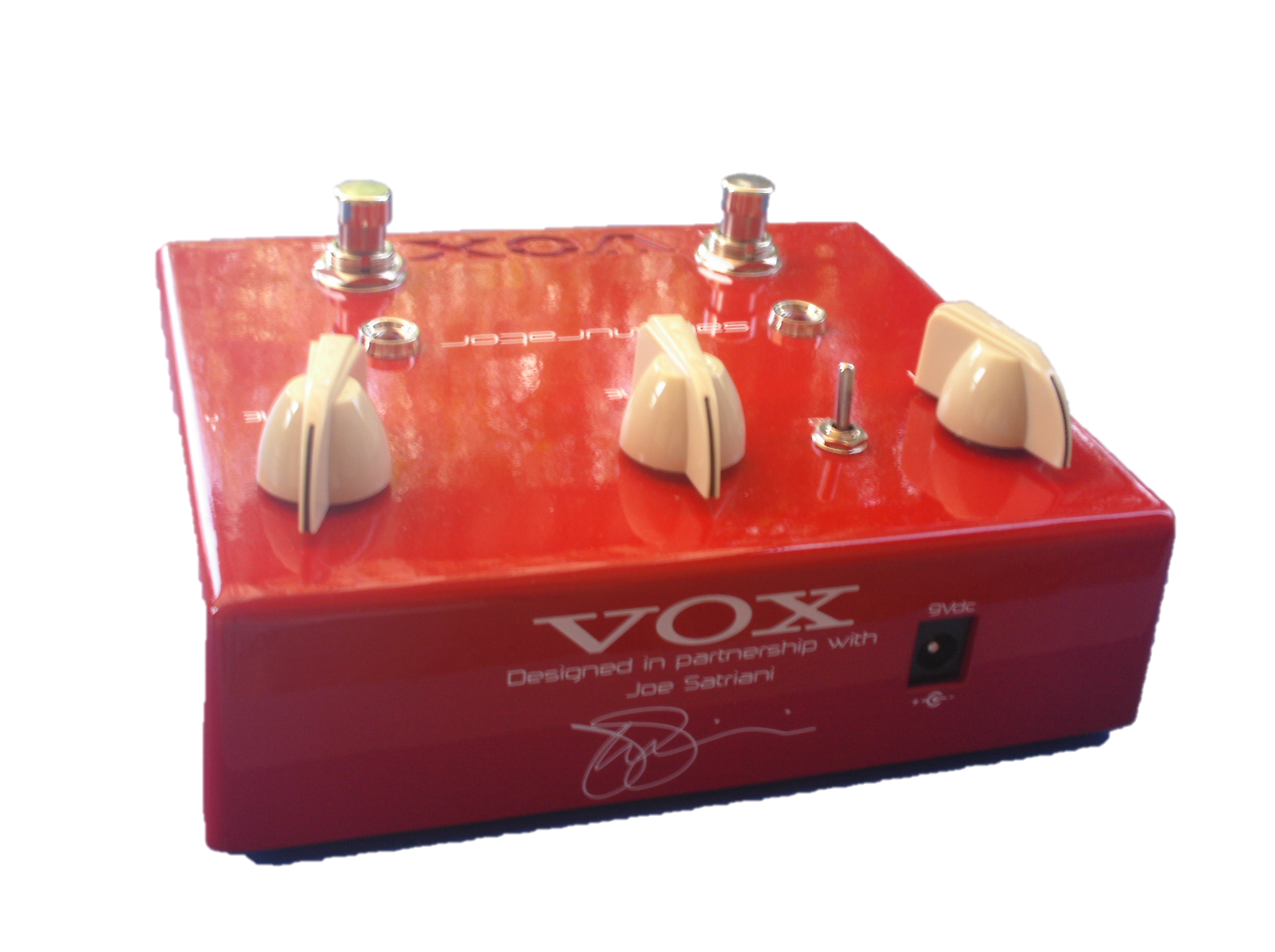
Satriani's signature distortion pedal, "Satchurator", by Vox.

His effects pedals include the Vox wah, Dunlop Cry Baby wah, RMC Wizard wah, DigiTech Whammy, B.K. Butler Tube Driver, Boss DS-1, Boss CH-1, Boss CE-2, Boss DD-2 and a standard Boss DD-3 (used together to emulate reverb effects), Boss BF-3, Boss OC-2, Barber Burn Drive Unit, Fulltone Deja Vibe, Fulltone Ultimate Octave, and Electro-Harmonix POG (Polyphonic Octave Generator), the latter being featured prominently on the title cut to his 2006 Super Colossal. He has collaborated with Vox on a range of signature-effect stompboxes. These include the "Satchurator" and "Ice 9" distortions, the "Time Machine" delay, and the "Big Bad Wah".

Satriani's 2000 guitar rig has been documented in detail.

== Musical themes ==
Satriani's work frequently makes references to various science fiction stories and ideas. "Surfing with the Alien", "Back to Shalla-Bal", and "The Power Cosmic 2000" refer to the comic book character Silver Surfer, while "Ice 9" refers to the secret government ice weapon in Kurt Vonnegut's Cat's Cradle. "Borg Sex" is a reference to Star Trek, which features a cybernetic race known as the Borg. His albums and songs often have otherworldly titles, such as Not of this Earth, Crystal Planet, Is There Love in Space?, and Engines of Creation.

On the album Super Colossal, the song titled "Crowd Chant" was originally called "Party on the Enterprise". It would have featured sampled sounds from the Starship Enterprise from Star Trek. But as Satriani explained in a podcast, legal issues regarding the samples could not be resolved, and he was unable to get permission to use them. He then removed the sounds from the song and called it "Crowd Chant". Its ending theme was inspired by composer Gabriel Fauré's "Pavane in F-sharp minor, Op. 50". The song is used as goal celebration music for a number of National Hockey League and Major League Soccer teams, including the Minnesota Wild (NHL), New York Islanders (NHL), and New England Revolution (MLS). The song is also used in the 2K Sports hockey video game NHL 2k10.

"Redshift Riders", another song from Super Colossal, is "...based on the idea that in the future, when people can travel throughout space, they will theoretically take advantage of the cosmological redshift effect so they can be swung around large planetary objects and get across [the] universe a lot faster than normal", according to Satriani. On the album Professor Satchafunkilus and the Musterion of Rock, the song "I Just Wanna Rock" is about a giant robot on the run who happens to stumble upon a rock concert.

== Awards and nominations ==
=== California Music Awards ===
Originated by the now-defunct magazine BAM in 1977 as the Bay Area Music Awards, the "Bammies" were expanded and renamed in 1998 to honor music across California.

Year	Nominee / work	Award	Result
1991	Joe Satriani	Outstanding Guitarist	Won

=== Classic Rock Roll of Honour Awards ===
Year	Nominee / work	Award	Result
2015	Joe Satriani	The Maestro	Won

=== Grammy Awards ===
Satriani has the fourth-most Grammy Award nominations (15, after Brian McKnight, Snoop Dogg, and Zubin Mehta) of any artist without winning. See further artists.

Nominations
Year	Album	Category
1989	"Always With Me, Always With You"	Best Pop Instrumental Performance
1989	Surfing with the Alien	Best Rock Instrumental Performance
1990	"The Crush of Love"	Best Rock Instrumental Performance
1991	Flying in a Blue Dream	Best Rock Instrumental Performance
1993	The Extremist	Best Rock Instrumental Performance
1994	"Speed of Light"	Best Rock Instrumental Performance
1995	"All Alone"	Best Rock Instrumental Performance
1997	"(You're) My World"	Best Rock Instrumental Performance
1998	"Summer Song" (Live)	Best Rock Instrumental Performance
1999	"A Train of Angels"	Best Rock Instrumental Performance
2001	"Until We Say Goodbye"	Best Rock Instrumental Performance
2002	"Always With Me, Always With You" (Live)	Best Rock Instrumental Performance from Live in San Francisco
2003	"Starry Night"	Best Rock Instrumental Performance
2006	Super Colossal	Best Rock Instrumental Performance
2008	"Always With Me, Always With You" (Live)	Best Rock Instrumental Performance from Satriani Live!

== Discography ==
- Not of This Earth (1986)
- Surfing with the Alien (1987)
- Flying in a Blue Dream (1989)
- The Extremist (1992)
- Time Machine (1993)
- Joe Satriani (1995)
- Crystal Planet (1998)
- Engines of Creation (2000)
- Strange Beautiful Music (2002)
- Is There Love in Space? (2004)
- Super Colossal (2006)
- Professor Satchafunkilus and the Musterion of Rock (2008)
- Black Swans and Wormhole Wizards (2010)
- Unstoppable Momentum (2013)
- Shockwave Supernova (2015)
- What Happens Next (2018)
- Shapeshifting (2020)
- The Elephants of Mars (2022)
