= Jeff Campitelli =

American drummer

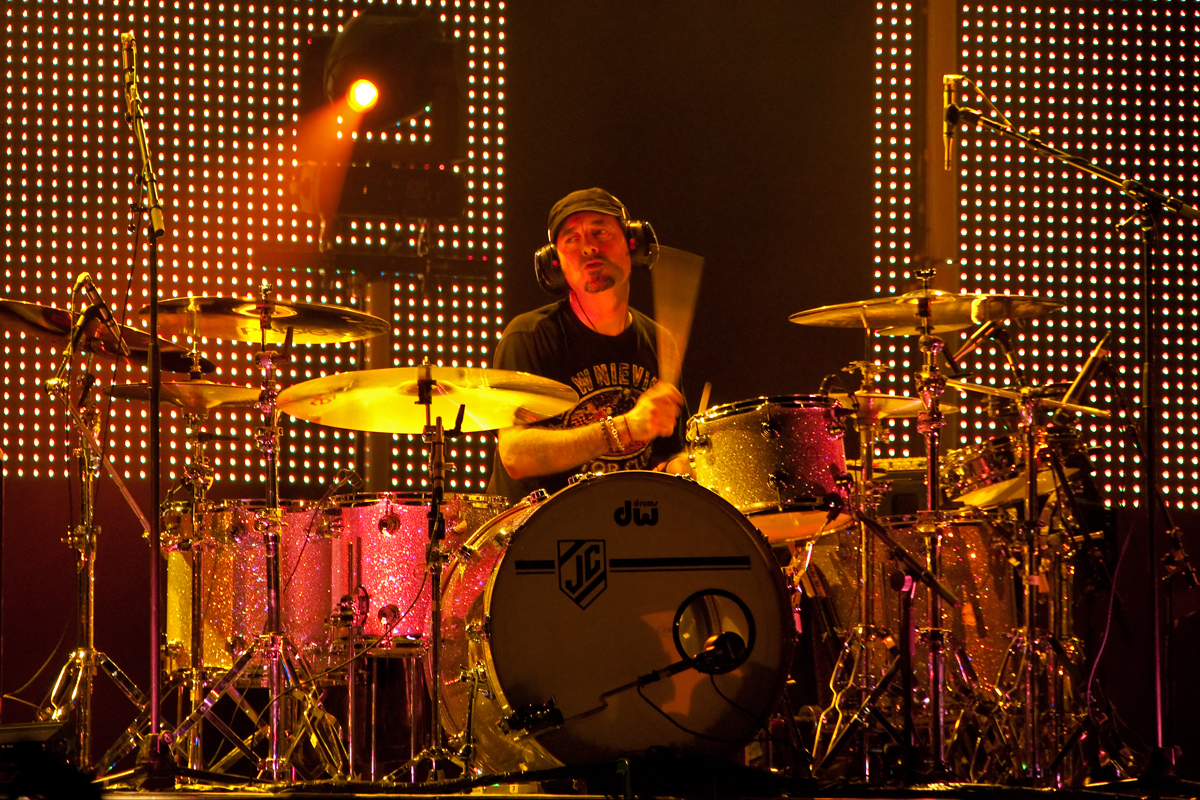
- Campitelli playing with Joe Satriani, Heineken Music Hall, Amsterdam 29 October., 2010

Background information
- Born: 29 December 1960 (age 65)
- Occupation: Musician
- Instrument: Drums
- Label: Roadrunner

Jeff Campitelli (born 29 December 1960) is an American drummer best known for his collaborations with Joe Satriani. He has played on most of Satriani's albums and is a frequent member of his touring band. Before Satriani's breakthrough in instrumental music he played with Joe Satriani in a band called The Squares. Jeff taught drums at Danville Music Studio in Danville, CA in the 1990s.
