= Mike Fraser (music producer) =

Canadian record producer

- Origin: Canada
- Occupations: Record producer; engineer; mixer
- Website: mikefrasermix.com

Mike Fraser is a Canadian record producer, engineer, and mixer. He has recorded and mixed six records for AC/DC: The Razors Edge, Ballbreaker, Stiff Upper Lip, Black Ice, Rock or Bust, and Power Up.

He has also worked with artists such as Franz Ferdinand (including on the singles "No You Girls" and "Ulysses"), Metallica, Aerosmith (Pump and Permanent Vacation), Zac Brown Band (The Grohl Sessions, Vol. 1), Joe Satriani, the Cult, Enter Shikari, Chickenfoot, Van Halen (Balance), Elvis Costello, and Led Zeppelin.

== Selected credits ==
Legend: P – producer; E – engineer; M – mixer

Year	Artist	Title	Album	Contribution
1987	Aerosmith		Permanent Vacation	E/M
1987	Paul Janz		Electricity	M
1987	Loverboy	"Notorious"	Wildside	M
1988	Tom Cochrane & Red Rider		Victory Day	E
1988	Dan Reed Network		Dan Reed Network	E/M
1988	Shades Apart		Shades Apart	E/M
1989	Aerosmith		Pump	E/M
1989	Bad English		Bad English	M
1989	Blue Murder		Blue Murder	E/M
1989	The Cult		Sonic Temple	E/M
1989	Rush		A Show of Hands	M
1990	AC/DC		The Razors Edge	E/M
1990	Kim Mitchell		I Am a Wild Party (Live)	M
1990	Robert Palmer		Don't Explain	M
1990	Poison		Flesh & Blood	Co-P/E/M
1990	Andy Taylor		Dangerous	M
1990	Thunder		Backstreet Symphony	E/M
1991	The Cult		Ceremony	M
1991	Dan Reed Network		The Heat	E/M
1991	SouthGang		Tainted Angel	M
1993	Bryan Adams		So Far So Good	M
1993	Blue Murder		Nothin' But Trouble	M
1993	David Coverdale & Jimmy Page		Coverdale–Page	Co-P/E/M
1993	Dio		Strange Highways	P/E/M
1993	Horsehead		Horsehead	M
1993	Metallica		Live Shit: Binge & Purge	M
1994	Aerosmith		Big Ones	M
1994	Jackyl		Push Comes to Shove	E/M
1994	Yngwie Malmsteen		The Seventh Sign	M
1995	AC/DC		Ballbreaker	Co-P/E/M
1995	Thunder		Behind Closed Doors	P/E/M
1995	Van Halen		Balance	M
1995	Vince Neil		Carved in Stone	M
1996	Metallica		Load	M
1997	Metallica		Reload	M
1997	Jackyl		Cut the Crap	P/E/M
1998	Jackyl		Stayin' Alive	E/M
1998	Metallica		Garage Inc.	M
1998	Joe Satriani		Crystal Planet	P/E/M
1998	Thunder		The Only One	E/M
1999	Blue Man Group		Audio	M
1999	Guns N' Roses		Live Era '87–'93	M
1999	Mötley Crüe		Supersonic and Demonic Relics	M
1999	Pound		Same Old Life	M
1999	Shades Apart		Eyewitness	E/M
2000	AC/DC		Stiff Upper Lip	E/M
2000	Amen		We Have Come for Your Parents	E/M
2000	Jesse James Dupree		Foot Fetish	M
2001	30 Odd Foot of Grunts		Bastard Life or Clarity	M
2001	Joe Satriani		Live in San Francisco	M
2001	Slipknot		Iowa	E
2002	Adema	"Immortal"	Insomniac's Dream	M
2002	Glassjaw		Worship and Tribute	E/M
2002	Gob		F.U. EP	P/E/M
2002	Something Corporate		Leaving Through the Window	E
2002	Vex Red		Start with a Strong and Persistent Desire	E/M
2003	30 Odd Foot of Grunts		Other Ways of Speaking	M
2003	The Blood Brothers		...Burn, Piano Island, Burn	E/M
2003	Hatebreed		The Rise of Brutality	M
2004	Amen		Death Before Musick	E/M
2004	The Higgins		Wild Minds	M
2004	Yngwie Malmsteen		Instrumental Best Album	M
2004	Joe Satriani		Is There Love in Space?	M
2005	Hedley	"Trip"	Hedley	M
2005	Hinder		Extreme Behavior	M
2005	Yngwie Malmsteen		Unleash the Fury	M
2005	Primal Fear		Seven Seals	M
2005	Team Sleep		Team Sleep	E
2006	Jakalope		Born 4	M
2006	Marianas Trench		Fix Me	E/M
2006	Mötley Crüe		Carnival of Sins Live	M
2006	Rush		Rush Replay X 3	M
2006	Joe Satriani		Satriani Live!	M
2006	Joe Satriani		Super Colossal	Co-P/E/M
2006	Satyricon		Now, Diabolical	M
2006	Strapping Young Lad		The New Black	M
2007	Biffy Clyro		Puzzle	E
2007	Hedley		Famous Last Words	M
2007	IllScarlett		All Day with It	M
2007	Kelly Rowland	"Unity"	Ms. Kelly	M
2007	Koritni		Lady Luck	M
2007	Neurosonic		Drama Queen	E/M
2007	Paradise Lost		In Requiem	M
2007	Social Code		Social-Code	M
2007	State of Shock		Life, Love & Lies	M
2007	Nathan Wiley		The City Destroyed Me	M
2008	AC/DC		Black Ice	E/M
2008	Hail the Villain		Population: Declining	M
2008	Jackie Greene	3 tracks	Giving Up the Ghost	M
2008	Matt Mays		Terminal Romance	M
2008	Sam Roberts		Love at the End of the World	M
2008	Steeve Estatof		Poison Idéal	M
2008	Stone Gods		Silver Spoons & Broken Bones	M
2008	Voodoo Six		First Hit for Free	M
2009	The Answer		Everyday Demons	M
2009	Bif Naked		The Promise	M
2009	Chickenfoot		Chickenfoot	M
2009	Colin James		Rooftops and Satellites	Co-P/E/M
2009	Die Mannequin		Fino + Bleed	M
2009	Doc Walker	"I'm Gonna Make You Love Me"	Go	M
2009	The Dudes		Blood. Guts. Bruises. Cuts	M
2009	Faber Drive	"By Your Side"	Can't Keep a Secret	M
2009	Fast Romantics		The Fast Romantics	M
2009	Franz Ferdinand		Tonight: Franz Ferdinand	M
2009	Hedley	6 tracks	The Show Must Go	M
2009	Jets Overhead	3 tracks	No Nations	M
2009	Young Artists for Haiti	"Wavin' Flag"		E
2009	Koritni		Game of Fools	M
2009	Marianas Trench	6 tracks	Masterpiece Theatre	M
2009	Pointed Sticks		Three Lefts Make a Right	M
2009	The Rankin Family	3 tracks	These Are the Moments	M
2009	Shiloh		Picture Imperfect	M
2009	Social Code		Rock 'n' Roll	M
2010	Airbourne		No Guts. No Glory.	M
2010	Bad Company		Live at Wembley DVD 5.1	E/M
2010	Bad Religion		30 Years Live	M
2010	Brother Clyde	"Lately"	Brother Clyde	M
2010	Buckcherry		All Night Long	M
2010	Fast Romantics		Kidcutter	M
2010	Jonas and the Massive Attraction	3 tracks	Big Slice	M
2010	Lillix	"Dance Alone", "Nowhere to Run"	Tigerlily	M
2010	Melissa Auf der Maur	4 tracks	Out of Our Minds	M
2010	Joe Satriani		Black Swans and Wormhole Wizards	Co-P/E/M
2010	The Virginmarys	6 tracks	Cast the First Stone	M
2011	Art of Dying	"Die Trying"	Vices and Virtues	M
2011	Chickenfoot		Chickenfoot III	Co-P/E/M
2011	Marea		En mi hambre mando yo	M
2011	Mother Mother		Eureka	M
2011	State of Shock		Rock N' Roll Romance	M
2011	Syndicate		Syndicate	M
2011	The Trews		Hope & Ruin	M
2012	Blackberry Smoke	4 tracks	The Whippoorwill	M
2012	Citizens!	"Reptile"	Here We Are	M
2012	Terri Clark	3 tracks	Roots and Wings	M
2012	The Cult		Choice of Weapon	M
2012	The Dudes	2 tracks	Barbers, Thieves and Bartenders	M
2012	Enter Shikari		A Flash Flood of Colour	M
2012	Danko Jones		Rock and Roll Is Black and Blue	M
2012	Mumiy Troll		Vladivostok	M
2012	Joe Satriani		Satchurated: Live in Montreal	M
2012	The Stanfields		Death & Taxes	Co-P/E/M
2012	Buckcherry	"Wherever I Go"	Avengers Assemble	M
2013	The Answer		New Horizon	M
2013	Clay Cook	5 tracks	North Star	M
2013	Franz Ferdinand	5 tracks	Right Thoughts, Right Words, Right Action	M
2013	Incura	"The Greatest Con"	Incura	M
2013	Leslie West		Still Climbing	M
2013	Newsted		Heavy Metal Music	M
2013	Joe Satriani		Unstoppable Momentum	Co-P/E/M
2013	Zac Brown Band		The Grohl Sessions, Vol. 1	E/M
2014	AC/DC		Rock or Bust	E/M
2015	Cancer Bats		Searching for Zero	M
2015	Thunder		Wonder Days	M
2016	Airbourne		Breakin' Outta Hell	E/M
2017	Satyricon		Deep Calleth Upon Deep	M
2018	Corrosion of Conformity		No Cross No Crown	M
2018	Joe Satriani		What Happens Next	Co-P/E/M
2020	AC/DC		Power Up	E/M
2021	Thunder		All the Right Noises	M
