= Lost Melodies: A Collection of Rarities, Demos, and Remixes =

Compilation album by Jets Overhead
- Released: June 26, 2007
- Genre: Dream pop, alternative rock
- Length: 31:43
- Label: Microgroove
- Producer: Neil Osborne

Jets Overhead chronology
Bridges (2006)	Lost Melodies: A Collection of Rarities, Demos, and Remixes (2007)	No Nations (2009)

Lost Melodies: A Collection of Rarities, Demos, and Remixes is a compilation album by the Canadian alternative rock band Jets Overhead. The album was released on June 26, 2007, and contains demo versions of a number of tracks from the group's first album, Bridges, remixes of two songs from the Jets Overhead EP, as well as two b-sides.

== Track listing ==
1. "No More Nothing (Demo)" – 3:07
2. "Suicide Machines" – 3:41
3. "Blue Is Red (Demo)" – 4:14
4. "Bridges (Demo)" – 3:38
5. "Shadow Knows (Demo)" – 5:29
6. "Shooting Star" – 2:57
7. "Addiction (Warne Livesey remix)" – 4:42
8. "Sun Sun Sun (Warne Livesey remix)" - 3:55
