= When Moonshine and Dynamite Collide =

Studio album by Jackyl
- Released: 2010
- Genre: Hard rock
- Length: 40:42

Jackyl chronology
Live at the Full Throttle Saloon (2004)	When Moonshine and Dynamite Collide (2010)	Best in Show (2012)

When Moonshine and Dynamite Collide is the 6th studio album from Jackyl and is Jackyl's first studio album in 8 years since Relentless from 2002.

When Moonshine and Dynamite Collide features a cover of Janis Joplin's "Mercedes Benz", and a lyrically reworked cover of "Just Like A Negro", originally by the funk rock band Mother's Finest. The album also contains a studio version of "Deeper in Darkness" which first appeared in a live version on their live album Night of the Living Dead from 1996.

The album was rated 3.5 out of 5 stars by AllMusic.

== Track listing ==
1. "Loads of Fun" - 3:27
2. "I Can't Stop" - 3:21
3. "She's Not a Drug" - 3:39
4. "My Moonshine Kicks Your Cocaine's Ass" - 3:25
5. "Get Mad at It" - 2:58
6. "The Overflow of Love" - 3:20
7. "When Moonshine and Dynamite Collide" - 4:26
8. "Just Like a Negro" - 3:51
9. "Deeper in Darkness" - 4:20
10. "Freight Train" - 2:53
11. "Mercedes Benz" - 1:38
12. "Full Throttle" - 3:19

== Just Like a Negro ==
Due to Jackyl's southern-redneck reputation, the band has come under fire on blogs and message boards all over the internet for their cover of "Just Like a Negro", calling the band racist. The song was originally released by the funk rock band Mother's Finest, with whom the members of Jackyl are good friends. The vocals on the cover version have been reworked into a song about unity and the black roots in rock’n’roll music.

During an interview with Kansas City's the Johnny Dare Morning Show on July 19, 2010, Jesse James Dupree released that Darryl "D.M.C." McDaniels (of Run-D.M.C. fame) had contacted the band about teaming together to re-work "Just Like a Negro" on which he would contribute vocals. Being a close personal friend of radio host and shock jock Johnny Dare, Dupree allowed 98.9 The Rock to debut the re-worked version of the song, which feature both newly recorded vocals by Dupree and McDaniels. McDaniels, who is not a stranger to teaming with rock groups, even makes reference to 20 years ago singing with Jay and Joe (Jason Mizell & Joe Perry). This is referring to Run-D.M.C.'s collaboration with rock legends Aerosmith on the rap rock classic" Walk This Way". Dupree also stated that this version of "Just Like a Negro" was released to iTunes on August 24, 2010.
