= Lumberjack (disambiguation) =

A lumberjack is a worker in the logging industry.

Lumberjack, lumberjacks or The Lumberjack may also refer to:

== Arts, entertainment and media ==
=== Film ===
- Lumberjack (film), a 1944 American film directed by Lesley Selander

=== Literature ===
- Lumberjack (1974), a book written and illustrated by Canadian artist William Kurelek, about his days working in a logging camp
- The Lumberjack (newspaper), a Humboldt State University newspaper
- The Lumberjack, a Northern Arizona University newspaper

=== Music ===
- Lumberjacks (group), the hip hop duo between rappers T-Mo and Khujo
- "Lumberjack" (1960), a song by Johnny Cash on his album Ride This Train (1960)
- "The Lumberjack" (Hal Willis song), a song by Hal Willis
- "The Lumberjack" (Jackyl song), a song by Jackyl
- "Lumberjack" (song), a 2021 song by Tyler, the Creator

== Sports ==
- Bangor Lumberjacks, a former baseball team based in Bangor, Maine, U.S.
  - formerly known as Adirondack Lumberjacks
- Cleveland Lumberjacks, a former ice hockey team based in Ohio, U.S.
- Covington Lumberjacks, a collegiate summer baseball team in Virginia, U.S.
- East Bay Lumberjacks, a baseball team based in Oakland, California, U.S.
- Granite City Lumberjacks, a junior ice hockey team based in Sauk Rapids, Minnesota, U.S.
- Hearst Lumberjacks, a junior ice hockey team from Ontario, Canada
- Maine Lumberjacks, a former U.S. minor league basketball team
- Muskegon Lumberjacks, a junior ice hockey team from Michigan, U.S.
  - Muskegon Lumberjacks (1984–1992)
  - Muskegon Lumberjacks (1992–2010)
- Philadelphia Lumberjacks, a former American basketball team
- The Portland LumberJax, a former lacrosse team based in Portland, Oregon
- Vermont Lumberjacks, a junior ice hockey organization from Burlington, U.S.
- The Yukon Lumberjacks, a former professional wrestling tag team
- Wausau Lumberjacks, a former baseball team based in Wisconsin, U.S.

== Students and athletic teams nicknamed lumberjacks ==
- Dakota College at Bottineau, North Dakota, U.S.
- Humboldt State Lumberjacks, California, U.S.
- Northern Arizona Lumberjacks, Arizona, U.S.
- Stephen F. Austin Lumberjacks and Ladyjacks, Texas, U.S.

== Other uses ==
- Operation Lumberjack, a military operation near the end of World War II
- Lumberjack, a troop from the mobile game Clash Royale

== See also ==
- Lumberjack breakfast, a hearty full breakfast said to originate in Canada
- "The Lumberjack Song", by Monty Python: "I'm a lumberjack and I'm okay / I sleep all night and I work all day"
- Lumberjack 100, an ultra-endurance mountain bike race
- Lumberjack match, a type of professional wrestling match
- Lumberjack World Championship
- Lumberjack Steam Train, a passenger excursion train operated by the Laona and Northern Railway
- Lumberjack Man, 2015 film
- Lumberjack Band, a marching band who played at Green Bay Packers games
- Urban lumberjacking
- Timberjack (disambiguation)
