= Choice Cuts (Jackyl album) =

Greatest hits album by Jackyl
- Released: 1998
- Recorded: 1992–1997
- Genre: Hard rock
- Label: Geffen Records

Jackyl chronology
Cut the Crap (1997)	Choice Cuts (1998)	Stayin' Alive (1998)

Professional ratings
Review scores
Source	Rating
AllMusic	3/5 stars

Choice Cuts is a compilation album by Jackyl and includes two new songs.

== Track listing ==
1. "We're an American Band" (new track)
2. "Down on Me" (from Jackyl)
3. "When Will It Rain" (from Jackyl)
4. "Locked and Loaded" (from Cut the Crap)
5. "I Stand Alone" (from Jackyl)
6. "I Am the Walrus" (new track)
7. "Push Comes to Shove" (from Push Comes to Shove)
8. "Headed for Destruction" (from Push Comes to Shove)
9. "The Lumberjack" (from Jackyl)
10. "Misery Loves Company" (from Cut the Crap)
11. "Dixieland" (from Push Comes to Shove)
12. "Secret of the Bottle" (from Push Comes to Shove)
13. "Dirty Little Mind" (live Portland, OR '93) (from "Push Comes to Shove" single)
14. "Redneck Punk" (live Portland, OR '93) (previously unreleased live track)
15. "Mister, Can You Spare a Dime" (from "I Stand Alone" single)
