= Live at Sasquatch Festival 2010 =

Live At Sasquatch Festival 2010

Live album by Jets Overhead
- Released: May 3, 2010
- Recorded: 2010
- Genre: Dream pop, alternative rock
- Length: 37:32
- Label: Microgroove

Jets Overhead chronology
No Nations (2009)	Live At Sasquatch Festival 2010 (2010)	Bystander (2011)

Live At Sasquatch Festival 2010 is a live album by Canadian alternative rock band Jets Overhead. The album was released on May 3, 2011 and contains live recordings of the 2010 Sasquatch Festival. The album includes songs that appeared on Jets Overhead’s self-titled EP, Bridges, and No Nations.

== Track listing ==
1. "Sun Sun Sun" – 4:00
2. "No Nations" – 2:57
3. "Sure Sign" – 3:12
4. "Always a First Time" – 3:08
5. "Seems So Far" – 5:04
6. "Where Did You Go" – 3:30
7. "Heading For Nowhere" – 3:53
8. "Tired of the Comfort" – 5:18
9. "Mirror Mirror" - 6:00

== Personnel ==
- Adam Kittredge: Vocals, Guitar
- Antonia Freybe-Smith: Vocals, Keyboards
- Jocelyn Greenwood: Bass
- Piers Henwood: Guitars, Keyboards
- Luke Renshaw: Drums, Percussion, Vocals
