= Best in Show (Jackyl album) =

Studio album by Jackyl
- Released: July 31, 2012
- Genre: Hard rock
- Length: 44:49
- Label: Mighty Loud

Jackyl chronology
When Moonshine and Dynamite Collide (2010)	Best in Show (2012)	Rowyco (2016)

Singles from Best in Show
- 1. "Screwdriver" Released: June 17, 2012

Best in Show is the seventh studio album from the southern rock band Jackyl.

== Father's Day single release with Nigel Dupree Band ==
The album was released on July 31, 2012, simultaneously with Up to No Good, the second album by Nigel Dupree Band, fronted by the vocalist Nigel Thomas Dupree, the son of Jackyl's lead singer, Jesse James Dupree. In honor of Father's Day, the first singles from Best in Show and Up to No Good, titled "Screwdriver" and "Tumbleweed", respectively, were issued to radio on June 17, 2012, with an add date at radio of June 26, 2012.

== Cover songs ==
The album includes cover versions of "It's Tricky" by Run-D.M.C. and "Cover of the Rolling Stone" by Dr. Hook & the Medicine Show, the latter sampling the "stomp-stomp-clap" of Queen's "We Will Rock You".

== Reception ==
Following its release, Best In Show was met with positive responses. William Clark of Guitar International gave the album a positive review, saying, "Best In Show proves even though the members of Jackyl are 20 years older, nothing has changed when it comes to their crazy party attitude."

In the US, the album debuted at No. 84 on Billboard 200, No. 30 on Top Rock Albums, and No. 7 on Hard Rock Albums, selling around 5,000 in the first week. The album sold 26,000 copies in the United States by July 2016.

== Track listing ==
No.	Title	Length
1.	"Best in Show"	4:04
2.	"Encore"	3:55
3.	"Screwdriver"	4:08
4.	"Horns Up"	3:28
5.	"Golden Spookytooth"	3:30
6.	"Cover of the Rolling Stone"	2:59
7.	"Walk My Mile"	5:18
8.	"Favorite Sin"	3:17
9.	"Better Than Chicken"	2:44
10.	"Don't Lay Down On Me"	3:57
11.	"Eleven"	4:30
12.	"It's Tricky (Featuring Darryl "D.M.C." McDaniels)"	2:59
Total length:		44:49

== Personnel ==
- Jesse James Dupree - vocals, chainsaw
- Jeff Worley - guitars
- Roman Glick - bass
- Chris Worley - drums

== Charts ==
Chart (2012)	Peak position
US Billboard 200	84
US Top Hard Rock Albums (Billboard)	7
US Independent Albums (Billboard)	12
US Top Rock Albums (Billboard)	30
