= Sebastian James (singer) =

American singer (born 1992)

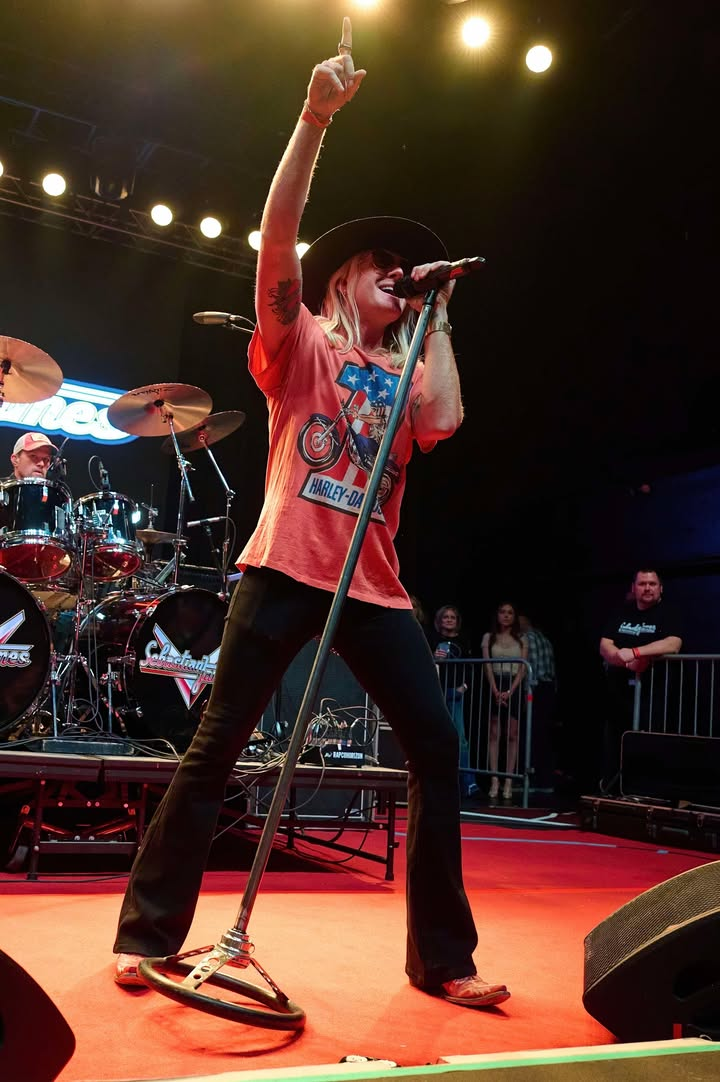
- James at Uptown Theatre December 2024

Background information
- Born: 1992; Kansas City, Missouri United States
- Genres: Rock
- Occupations: Singer, percussionist, guitarist
- Instruments: Drum, guitar
- Years active: 2011–present
- Label: Tungsten Records
- Formerly of: Nigel Dupree Band
- Website: sebastianjamesmusic.com

Sebastian James (born 1992) is an American singer, songwriter, and multi-instrumentalist from Kansas City, Missouri.

== Early life and education ==
James started touring at age 18 following his graduation from Park Hill South High School in 2011. He would share his talents alongside acts such as Papa Roach, Shinedown, Poison, Korn and Stone Temple Pilots. During these performances, he played at venues such as Hollywood's Whisky a Go Go and Full Throttle Saloon, where he participated in seasons 4 and 5 of TruTV's television series Full Throttle Saloon. He later earned his Master of Business Administration from Park University in 2018, graduating with summa cum laude honors.

== Career ==
In addition to his original endeavors, James would go on to found, "The Rock Gods," a Vegas-style production which performs arena rock shows using pyrotechnics. The Rock Gods obtained international notoriety for their shows and recreation of classic rock ensembles.

In 2024, his debut solo single, "American Made", reached No. 39 on Mediabase Top 40 charts, where it remained for over 14 weeks. The follow-up single, "When We Were Young", climbed further, reaching No. 23 on Billboard Charts and No. 20 on iHeart Radio Adult Contemporary Charts.

James is also a co-founder of Tungsten Records. In October 2024, James released his first solo studio album, "Old School Cool", under this label. The work was mastered by Dave Collins, who is a Grammy Award winning mastering engineer that has collaborated with bands such as Black Sabbath, Bruce Springsteen, Bon Jovi and Metallica.

In December 2025, James and Against All Will guitarist Jimmy Allen announced that they would be teaming up for James' 2026 extended play entitled 1992 EP, with single "Dead Man Walking" releasing the following month. The project marks a stylistic shift for James, as he pays homage to Seattle's grunge pioneers while showcasing his vocal range and songwriting versatility.

== Discography ==
- Old School Cool (2024)
- 1992 EP (2026)
