= Wayland (band) =

American crossover country rock band

- Origin: Wayland, Michigan, U.S.
- Genres: rock and roll; southern rock; country
- Years active: 2010–present
- Label: Ironworks Records
- Members: Mitch Arnold; Phillip Vilenski; Joey Champagne; Kai Chambers
- Past members: Tyler Coburn Dean Pizzazz
- Website: waylandtheband.com

Wayland is a crossover country rock band consisting of singer/rhythm guitarist Mitchel Arnold, and guitarist/background vocalist Phillip Vilenski. The band was named after the city of Wayland where Vilenski grew up. The band is known for their extensive fan base and their transparent and intimate relationship with their fanbase, the Wayland Warriors.

== History ==
Mitchel Arnold, Phillip Vilenski, Dean Pizzazz, Tyler Coburn were four midwestern natives that all met in Los Angeles and built a band around Mitch and Phill's songwriting. One of their first gigs was becoming the house band at the Whisky A Go Go. While playing the Whisky A Gogo, they caught the ear of Michael Gurley (Dada) and Florian Ammon (Rammstein, Mariah Carey, U2) and they began developing twelve songs which would become their self titled debut album. They brought and introduced the band to Jude Cole and Keifer Sutherland and his label, Ironworks Records after winning the KLOS Battle Of The Bands.

They recorded at the famous Can Am studios in Los Angeles.

Wayland's debut album was released on October 29, 2010, on Ironworks Records. The band left Los Angeles after their album was released to live and tour in the Midwest. They rented a pre-civil war farm house outside of Wayland, Michigan.

Wayland caught the attention of the nationally syndicated radio show Free Beer & Hot Wings based in Grand Rapids, Michigan by bringing them breakfast and participating in a running segment where the morning show would make fun of local bands. The station's program director heard the band's music on the show, invited them into the office and added the single Shopping For A Savior into power rotation on 97.9 WGRD.

When that happened, Jude Cole (Lifehouse) immediately requested the band return to Los Angeles to record an EP to specifically release to active rock radio and recruited Jesse James Dupree (Jackyl, Full Throttle Saloon) as day-to-day management.

In 2012, Wayland released Welcome to My Head as part of a 4-song EP. Welcome To My Head peaked at #36 on the active rock charts and the band started touring relentlessly to radio markets across the country in an RV given to them for free through a sponsorship with American RV.

The band adopted the catchphrase "always on tour" performing over 250 shows per year and releasing radio singles Reno and Get A Little. "Get a Little", peaked at number six on the iTunes rock chart in 2014. This success warranted the band's spots on festivals and bike rallys. Their attendance grew and their radio relationships organically took a positive turn.

They became known for their acoustic performances on day time radio and their work ethic.

In 2016 the band was still touring while writing a record with Justin Rimer working at Crosstrax studio in Memphis. When the record was in its final stages, drummer Tyler Coburn exited the band in January 2017 and Nigel Dupree came in to re-record drums on the finished record. The record was mixed by Jeff Tomei in Atlanta before being released.

In September 2017, Rinse and Repeat was released under Thermal Entertainment under the management of Jesse Dupree and Mark Abramson (Roadrunner Records/ New Century Media.) The first single from this album, "Through the Fire" peaked in the Top 40 on the Billboard charts along with follow up single "Ghost" cowritten with Brent Smith and Zach Myers from Shinedown.

In June 2018 Wayland signed to Fearlyss Entertainment for full-time management and parts ways with Thermal Entertainment and Mighty Loud Ent.

In 2018, bass player Dean Pizzazz exited the band. Two year front of house sound engineer and close friend Dallas Hall took over on bass.

In 2018, the band began writing songs for their next record with Emmy award-winning songwriter Jacob Bunton, Cody Hansen and Marshal Dutton from Hinder, Keith Neilson of Buckcherry, and Bsamz of Bad Wolves.

The band beat out 4100 bands to win a coveted spot on the Kiss Kruise in 2018 and the Bon Jovi Cruise in 2019 with Sixthman.

On January 23rd, 2026, Wayland announced that they are setting the band down indefinitely, effectively breaking up after years of touring and releasing music.

== Band members ==
- Mitch Arnold - Lead vocals
- Phill Vilenski - Guitar

== Discography ==
- 2010: Wayland
- 2012: Welcome to My Head (EP)
- 2017: Rinse and Repeat

=== Singles ===
- Reno
- Get a Little
- Bloody Sunrise
