= Horns Up =

Horns Up may refer to:

- Horns Up (radio), a radio heavy metal program airing on KLOS
- "Horns Up", a song by Jackyl from their 2012 album Best in Show
