= Everyone's a Winner =

Everyone's a Winner may refer to:

- "Everyone's a Winner," a 1977 song by London, from their album Animal Games
- "Every 1's a Winner" (song), a 1978 song and eponymous album by Hot Chocolate
- Everyone's a Winner: Life in Our Congratulatory Culture, a 2011 non-fiction book by Joel Best
- "Everyone's a Winner," a 2016 song by Jackyl, from their album Rowyco
