= The Lumberjack (Jackyl song) =

Single by Jackyl

from the album Jackyl
- Released: 1992
- Genre: Hair metal
- Length: 3:29 (album version); 3:15 (radio edit)
- Label: Geffen
- Songwriter: Jesse James Dupree
- Producer: Brendan O'Brien

Jackyl singles chronology
"The Lumberjack" (1992)	"I Stand Alone" (1992)

"The Lumberjack" is a song by American rock group Jackyl. It was released in 1992 as the band's debut single.

== History ==
The song is noted for a chainsaw solo played by Dupree. William Phillips and Brian Cogan in the Encyclopedia of Heavy Metal Music referred to it as a "somewhat corny novelty hit".

The song's music video features John David Kaldoner, then the A&R executive of Geffen Records, portraying a lumberjack. Greg Vernon was the video's director.

== Chart performance ==
=== Weekly charts ===
Weekly chart performance for "The Lumberjack"
Chart (1992–1993)	Peak position
Australia (ARIA)	92
Netherlands (Dutch Top 40)	8
Netherlands (Single Top 100)	6
New Zealand (Recorded Music NZ)	14
US Mainstream Rock (Billboard)	24

=== Year-end charts ===
Year-end chart performance for "The Lumberjack"
Chart (1993)	Position
Netherlands (Dutch Top 40)	78
Netherlands (Single Top 100)	100
