= Motocultor Festival =

Annual music festival in Brittany, France

- Genre: Heavy metal and hardcore punk subgenres.
- Dates: Mid-August
- Locations: Pays de Vannes, Brittany, France
- Years active: 2007– present

Motocultor Festival is an annual music festival which takes place in Brittany, north-west France, in mid-August, since 2007. The programme features a variety of heavy metal and hardcore acts. Notable artists who have performed at previous festivals include Pestilence, Destruction, Sodom, Entombed, Meshuggah, Architects, Exodus, Bullet For My Valentine Korpiklaani, Opeth, Shining, Punish Yourself, Dagoba, Koritni, Madball, Betraying the Martyrs and Loudblast.
