= Out of Your Mouth =

Canadian rock band

- Also known as: Flu
- Origin: Calgary, Alberta, Canada
- Genres: Industrial rock, nu metal
- Years active: 1997–2004

Out of Your Mouth was a Canadian rock band from Calgary, Alberta. It was fronted by guitarist, vocalist, producer, and writer Jason Darr. The band is best known for their cover of Madonna's song "Music".

== History ==
Darr, a singer-songwriter, brought together a group of local Calgary musicians under the name Flu in 1997. The band played together for several years, including in Toronto during Music Week in 2001. They participated in the Cure's Greatest Hits tour and won a songwriting contest. Musicians included Darr, Brent Hodgins aka "The Colonel", Mark Radloff, and Paul Sperman. An album, Fish With Necks, containing mainly songs written by Darr, was self-released.

After a failed development deal with DreamWorks, Darr arranged a deal with Sony BMG. Because of trademark issues, the band changed their name to Out of Your Mouth. In 2004, Darr, with Sperman on drums and some guitar and backup vocals from Jerrod Maxwell-Lyster, began work on the album, and recorded a single which became a Canadian Top 40 hit, a rocked-up cover of Madonna's song "Music". The album, Draghdad, which included the "Music" track, was released in 2004.

To publicize the album, Darr, with Sperman on bass, Maxwell-Lyster on guitar, and drummer Rob Shawcross went out on tour with Social Code, Bif Naked, and The Salads, and later performed around Alberta with other bands.

After the tour, Paul Sperman left due to creative differences. Maxwell-Lyster and Shawcross also left over financial disagreements with Darr. Although Shawcross and Darr were still on good terms, the two parted ways and Darr formed a new band, Neurosonic. Maxwell-Lyster and Shawcross went on to form a local Calgary band called AutoBody.

== Discography ==
- Fish With Necks (as Flu) 1997 self-released album
- Peculiar (as Flu) 2000 self-released album
- "Music" (single) 2004 BMG
- Draghdad (album) 2004 BMG
