= Nouvelle Star season 2 =

Nouvelle Star
- Season 2
- Hosted by: Benjamin Castaldi
- Judges: André Manoukian; Dove Attia; Marianne James; Manu Katché
- Winner: Steeve Estatof
- Runner-up: Julien Laurence

Release
- Original release: 11 February – 13 May 2004

Season chronology
- ← Previous; À la Recherche de la Nouvelle Star Next → Season 3

The second season of the French television series Nouvelle Star on M6 began on 11 February 2004. With season two, the new name was adopted after the programme was known in its inaugural season 1 broadcast from 27 March to 10 July 2003) as À la Recherche de la Nouvelle Star. On the final broadcast on 13 May 2004, the title was won by Steeve Estatof.

Two of the judges, André Manoukian and Dove Attia returned, but judges Varda Kakon and Lionel Florence were replaced by Marianne James and Manu Katché. Benjamin Castaldi continued to host the show for a second season.

In the final, Steeve Estatof was declared winner by public vote, with Julien as runner-up.

== Finals ==
=== Finalists ===
(ages stated at time of contest)

| Contestant | Age | Hometown | Voted Off | Liveshow Theme |
|---|---|---|---|---|
| Steeve Estatof | 31 | Montalieu-Vercieu | Winner | Grand Finale |
| Julien Laurence | 30 | Geneva | May 13, 2004 | Grand Finale |
| Amel Bent | 18 | La Courneuve | May 6, 2004 | Semi Finale |
| Laura Tabourin | 18 | Bordeaux | April 29, 2004 | Love Songs |
| Charles Cattaert | 16 | Petite-Forêt | April 22, 2004 | The Sun |
| Babeth Lando | 23 | Grigny | April 15, 2004 | Pop-Rock Hits |
| Pascal Crisinel | 27 | Lausanne | April 8, 2004 | Number One French Hits |
| John Zerah | 22 | Massy | April 1, 2004 | Hits of the Last 15 Years |
| Geoffrey Lupart | 16 | La Roquette-sur-Siagne | March 25, 2004 | Pop Hits |
| SimonGad Barbey | 26 | Geneva | March 18, 2004 | R&B Hits |

=== Live show details ===
==== Pre Live Show (11 March 2004) ====
| Artist | Song (original artists) | Result |
|---|---|---|
| Amélia Dehas | "Les poèmes de Michel" (Teri Moïse) | Eliminated |
| Amel Bent | "Without You" (Mariah Carey) | Safe |
| Angélique | "La solitudine" (Laura Pausini) | Eliminated |
| Babeth Lando | "Killing Me Softly" (The Fugees) | Safe |
| Charles Cattaert | "Je ne suis pas un héros" (Daniel Balavoine) | Safe |
| Edwina Calcagno | "Marcia Baila" (Rita Mitsouko) | Eliminated |
| Geoffrey Lupart | "Que tu reviennes" (Patrick Fiori) | Safe |
| John Zerah | "Lettre à France" (Michel Polnareff) | Safe |
| Julie Rizzi | "Envole-moi" (Jean-Jacques Goldman) | Eliminated |
| Julien Laurence | "Tous les bateaux, tous les oiseaux" (Michel Polnareff) | Safe |
| Laura Tabourin | "La vie en rose" (Edith Piaf) | Safe |
| Pascal Crisinel | "Many Rivers to Cross" (Jimmy Cliff) | Safe |
| Rizlaine Rhadi | "You Gotta Be" (Des'ree) | Eliminated |
| SimonGad Barbey | "Sur la route" (Gérald de Palmas) | Safe |
| Steeve Estatof | "Every Breath You Take" (The Police) | Safe |

==== Live Show 1 (18 March 2004) ====
Theme: R&B Hits

| Artist | Song (original artists) | Result |
|---|---|---|
| Amel Bent | "Mistral gagnant" (Renaud) | Safe |
| Babeth Lando | "Mademoiselle chante le blues" (Patricia Kaas) | Safe |
| Charles Cattaert | "L'Aziza" (Daniel Balavoine) | Bottom two |
| Geoffrey Lupart | "Plus près des étoiles" (Gold) | Safe |
| John Zerah | "Le coup de folie" (Thierry Pastor) | Safe |
| Julien Laurence | "La groupie du pianiste" (Michel Berger) | Safe |
| Laura Tabourin | "Sans contrefaçon" (Mylène Farmer) | Safe |
| Pascal Crisinel | "All Night Long (All Night)" (Lionel Richie) | Safe |
| SimonGad Barbey | "Pour le plaisir" (Herbert Léonard) | Eliminated |
| Steeve Estatof | "Cargo" (Axel Bauer) | Safe |

==== Live Show 2 (25 March 2004) ====
Theme: Pop Hits

| Artist | Song (original artists) | Result |
|---|---|---|
| Amel Bent | "On the Radio" (Donna Summer) | Bottom two |
| Babeth Lando | "Lady Marmalade" (Christina Aguilera, Pink, Lil' Kim & Mýa) | Safe |
| Charles Cattaert | "J'ai encore rêvé d'elle" (Il était une fois) | Safe |
| Geoffrey Lupart | "Les murs de poussière" (Francis Cabrel) | Eliminated |
| John Zerah | "Karin Redinger" (Laurent Voulzy) | Safe |
| Julien Laurence | "J'ai oublié de vivre" (Johnny Hallyday) | Safe |
| Laura Tabourin | "Viens je t'emmène" (France Gall) | Safe |
| Pascal Crisinel | "Une belle histoire" (Michel Fugain) | Safe |
| Steeve Estatof | "Le sud" (Nino Ferrer) | Safe |

==== Live Show 3 (1 April 2004) ====
Theme: Hits of the Last 15 Years

| Artist | Song (original artists) | Result |
|---|---|---|
| Amel Bent | "Je sais pas" (Celine Dion) | Safe |
| Babeth Lando | "Parle-moi" (Isabelle Boulay) | Safe |
| Charles Cattaert | "En apesanteur" (Calogero) | Bottom two |
| John Zerah | "End of the Road" (Boyz II Men) | Eliminated |
| Julien Laurence | "One" (U2) | Safe |
| Laura Tabourin | "Torn" (Natalie Imbruglia) | Safe |
| Pascal Crisinel | "Si c'est bon comme ça" (Sinclair) | Safe |
| Steeve Estatof | "Tu ne m'as pas laissé le temps" (David Hallyday) | Safe |

==== Live Show 4 (8 April 2004) ====
Theme: Number One French Hits

| Artist | Song (original artists) | Result |
|---|---|---|
| Amel Bent | "La Bohème" (Charles Aznavour) | Safe |
| Babeth Lando | "Tandem" (Vanessa Paradis) | Safe |
| Charles Cattaert | "Lucie" (Pascal Obispo) | Safe |
| Julien Laurence | "Pauvres diables" (Julio Iglesias) | Safe |
| Laura Tabourin | "Zen" (Zazie) | Bottom two |
| Pascal Crisinel | "Pas de boogie woogie" (Eddy Mitchell) | Eliminated |
| Steeve Estatof | "Le chemin" (Kyo feat. Sita) | Safe |

==== Live Show 5 (15 April 2004) ====
Theme: Pop-Rock Hits

| Artist | Song (original artists) | Result |
|---|---|---|
| Amel Bent | "(Everything I Do) I Do It for You" (Bryan Adams) | Safe |
| Babeth Lando | "What's Love Got to Do with It" (Tina Turner) | Eliminated |
| Charles Cattaert | "J'en rêve encore" (Gérald de Palmas) | Bottom two |
| Julien Laurence | "Feel" (Robbie Williams) | Safe |
| Laura Tabourin | "Zombie" (The Cranberries) | Safe |
| Steeve Estatof | "Smells Like Teen Spirit" (Nirvana) | Safe |
| Amel Bent & Julien Laurence | "Il suffira d'un signe" (Jean-Jacques Goldman) | N/A |
| Charles Cattaert & Babeth Lando | "J'ai vu" (Niagara) | N/A |
| Laura Tabourin & Steeve Estatof | "Les Histoires d'A." (Rita Mitsouko) | N/A |

==== Live Show 6 (22 April 2004) ====
Theme: The Sun

| Artist | First song (original artists) | Second song | Result |
|---|---|---|---|
| Amel Bent | "Les vacances au bord de la mer" (Michel Jonasz) | "Au café des délices" (Patrick Bruel) | Safe |
| Charles Cattaert | "Hélène" (Roch Voisine) | "Holidays" (Michel Polnareff) | Eliminated |
| Julien Laurence | "Master Blaster (Jammin')" (Stevie Wonder) | "(Sittin' On) The Dock of the Bay" (Otis Redding) | Safe |
| Laura Tabourin | "A bailar calypso" (Elli Medeiros) | "The Girl from Ipanema" (Caetano Veloso) | Bottom two |
| Steeve Estatof | "Temps à nouveau" (Jean-Louis Aubert) | "No Woman, No Cry" (Bob Marley) | Safe |

| Artists | Song (original artists) |
|---|---|
| Amel Bent, Charles Cattaert & Laura Tabourin | "Le coup de soleil" (Richard Cocciante) |
| Julien Laurence & Steeve Estatof | "Sur la route" (Gérald de Palmas) |

==== Live Show 7 (29 April 2004) ====
Theme: Love Songs

| Artist | First song (original artists) | Second song | Result |
|---|---|---|---|
| Amel Bent | "Fallin'" (Alicia Keys) | "Savoir aimer" (Florent Pagny) | Safe |
| Julien Laurence | "Je vais t'aimer" (Michel Sardou) | "Stand by Me" (Ben E. King) | Safe |
| Laura Tabourin | "Au fur et à mesure" (Liane Foly) | "Be My Baby" (Vanessa Paradis) | Eliminated |
| Steeve Estatof | "Combien de temps" (Stephan Eicher) | "L'amour c'est comme une cigarette" (Sylvie Vartan) | Bottom two |

| Artists | Song (original artists) |
|---|---|
| Amel Bent & Steeve Estatof | "Quelques mots d'amour" (Michel Berger) |
| Julien Laurence & Laura Tabourin | "You're the One That I Want" (John Travolta & Olivia Newton-John) |

==== Live Show 8: Semi-final (6 May 2004) ====
| Artist | First song (original artists) | Second song | Result |
|---|---|---|---|
| Amel Bent | "I Will Always Love You" (Whitney Houston) | "L'Encre de tes yeux" (Francis Cabrel) | Eliminated |
| Julien Laurence | "Prendre racine" (Calogero) | "Purple Rain" (Prince) | Safe |
| Steeve Estatof | "Angie" (The Rolling Stones) | "Message in a Bottle" (The Police) | Safe |

==== Live final (13 May 2004) ====
| Artist | First song | Second song | Third song | Result |
|---|---|---|---|---|
| Julien Laurence | "A Whiter Shade of Pale" | "Pride (In the Name of Love)" | "Requiem pour un fou" | Runner-up |
| Steeve Estatof | "Highway to Hell" | "Knockin' on Heaven's Door" | "Le sud" | Winner |
