= Halfway Jam =

Music festival in America

Halfway Jam was a 1980s music festival in Royalton, Minnesota (minutes outside St. Cloud, and an hour north of Minneapolis) that takes place generally in the later part of July until more recently with newer bands being added.

The Jam is now a 3-day event (Thur-Sat) which draws 6-9K per night and allows on-site camping. Started as a Friday/Saturday event, Halfway added a 3rd day that was initially tribute bands, but started adding original acts in 2011.

The festival started in 2003 & drew around a thousand people until the promoters started booking the more name bands. There is a second stage (Rhino Stage) that features local/tribute bands from the area that plays in between main stage acts.

2004: Johnny Holms, Killer Hayseeds, Rollie Show, High Noon

2005: Blue Öyster Cult, Guess Who, Foghat

2006: Credence Clearwater Revisited, Eddie Money, Georgia Satellites, Badfinger

2007: Ted Nugent, Night Ranger, Starship w/Mickey Thomas, Quiet Riot, Guess Who

2008: Jackyl, Drowning Pool, Everclear, Cracker, Head East, The Romantics, Marshall Tucker, Georgia Satellites, Kentucky Headhunters, Grand Funk Railroad, The Smithereens

2009: Dokken, Skid Row, Jackyl, Great White, Bulletboys, April Wine, Sweet

2010: Tesla, Dokken, LA Guns, Winger, Warrant, Vince Neil

2011: Quiet Riot, Firehouse, Stephen Pearcy, Kix, Cinderella, Slaughter, Lita Ford, Skid Row

2012: Bang Tango, Trixter, Jackyl, Blackfoot, Molly Hatchet, 38 Special, Enuff Z'nuff, Lynch Mob, Stryper, Queensrÿche (first show w/new singer Todd La Torre)

2013: Pop Evil, Saliva, Smile Empty Soul, Bulletboys (cancelled a week before Jam), Jack Russell's Great White, Survivor, Tesla, Steelheart, Ratt, Loverboy

2014: Honeymoon Suite, Winger, Vixen, Kix, Sebastian Bach, Firehouse, April Wine, Jackyl
