= Bystander (EP) =

EP by Jets Overhead
- Released: March 8, 2011
- Recorded: 2009
- Genre: Dream pop, alternative rock
- Length: 25:53
- Label: Microgroove

Jets Overhead chronology
Live At Sasquatch Festival 2010 (2010)	Bystander (2011)

Bystander is a six track extended play by Canadian alternative rock band Jets Overhead. It was released on March 8, 2011 and was produced with Neil Osborne of 54-40. The EP is currently only available as a digital download. The songs on Bystander were originally recorded at the same time as No Nations, but were not included in No Nations because of stylistic difference.

Bystander was recorded on Hornby Island at the Joe King Hall and in Victoria, British Columbia at Seacoast Sound, the Alix Gooldon Hall, Miramontes Drive, and Eldorbud Place.

== Track listing ==
1. "Bystander" – 3:27
2. "Destroy You" – 4:36
3. "It's Not Up To Me" – 4:46
4. "Friendly Fire" – 3:27
5. "Fully Shed (Kevin Hamilton Remix)" – 6:14
6. "Bystander (Acoustic)" – 3:23

== Personnel ==
- Adam Kittredge: Vocals, Guitar
- Antonia Freybe-Smith: Vocals, Keyboards
- Jocelyn Greenwood: Bass
- Piers Henwood: Guitars, Keyboards
- Luke Renshaw: Drums, Percussion, Vocals
