= Stayin' Alive (Jackyl album) =

Studio album by Jackyl
- Released: 1998
- Genre: Southern metal; Southern rock
- Length: 40:54

Jackyl chronology
Choice Cuts (1998)	Stayin' Alive (1998)	Relentless (2002)

Professional ratings
Review scores
Source	Rating
AllMusic	2/5 stars

Stayin' Alive is the fourth studio album by southern metal band Jackyl, released in 1998.

== Track listing ==
1. "Problem"
2. "Crush"
3. "Can't Beat It with a Stick"
4. "Open for Business"
5. "Street Went Legit"
6. "Live Wire" (AC/DC cover) (Bon Scott, Angus Young, Malcolm Young)
7. "Gimme Back My Bullets" (Lynyrd Skynyrd cover) (Gary Rossington, Ronnie Van Zant)
8. "Nobody's Fault" (Aerosmith cover) (Steven Tyler, Brad Whitford)
9. "Dumbass Country Boy" (Live)
10. "Twice as Ugly" (Live)
11. "Locked and Loaded" (Live)
- Tracks 9–11 are live versions of songs from Cut the Crap.
