= Relentless (Jackyl album) =

Studio album by Jackyl
- Released: October 22, 2002
- Recorded: 2002
- Genre: Hard rock

Jackyl chronology
Stayin' Alive (1998)	Relentless (2002)	20th Century Masters – The Millennium Collection: The Best of Jackyl (2003)

Professional ratings
Review scores
Source	Rating
AllMusic	2.5/5 stars

Relentless is the fifth studio album from Jackyl. It is the first album to feature the new personnel line-up.

== Track listing ==
All songs written by Jesse James Dupree unless noted.

1. "If You Want It Heavy (I Weigh a Ton)" - 2:22
2. "I'm on Fire" - 3:10
3. "Kill the Sunshine" (Brian Johnson, Jesse James Dupree) – 3:31
4. "Lend Me a Hand" - 4:22
5. "Mr. Evil" (Dupree, Glick, Worley, Worley) - 3:47
6. "Vegas Smile" - 3:26
7. "Heaven Don't Want Me (And Hell's Afraid I'll Take Over)" - 4:00
8. "Down This Road Before" - 3:34
9. "Billy Badass" - 2:59
10. "Sparks From Candy" - 3:28
11. "Curse on You" - 4:33
12. "The More You Hate It" (Dupree, Dupree) - 1:53
