= Rock 'n' Roll (Social Code album) =

Rock 'N' Roll

Studio album by Social Code
- Released: September 1, 2009
- Recorded: Winter 2009
- Genre: Alternative rock
- Length: 36:08
- Label: Fontana North
- Producer: John Travis

Social Code chronology
Social-Code (2007)	Rock 'N' Roll (2009)

Professional ratings
Review scores
Source	Rating
AlternativeAddiction	3.5/5 stars
A 'n' E vibe	4.5/5 stars
CHARTattack	4/5 stars
Tangible Sounds	2.5/5 stars

Rock 'N' Roll is the third and final studio album by the Canadian alternative rock band Social Code. It was released on September 1, 2009, with the first single "Satisfied" released on iTunes on July 28, 2009.

The album, which contains 11 tracks, was produced by John Travis, who had previously worked with such artists as Kid Rock, Buckcherry and Sugar Ray, and was said to be heavier than the band's previous pop punk efforts, and influenced by such bands as Led Zeppelin, The Rolling Stones, Cheap Trick, Bruce Springsteen and The Black Crowes. Mike Fraser (AC/DC, Hinder, Aerosmith) mixed the album.

== Track listing ==
No.	Title	Length
1.	"Rock 'N' Roll"	3:45
2.	"Nothing Left to Lose"	2:51
3.	"Satisfied"	3:37
4.	"Buy Buy Baby"	3:10
5.	"Real Girl"	3:13
6.	"Fight For Love"	2:47
7.	"You Never Know What You Got Until It’s Gone"	2:45
8.	"Stay"	3:43
9.	"I'm Not Okay"	2:50
10.	"It's Too Late for Tomorrow"	3:13

iTunes Exclusive

No.	Title	Length
11.	"Lights" (Listed as track #5 on iTunes version)	3:14

== Singles ==
- "Satisfied"
- "Nothing Left to Lose"
- "I'm Not Okay"

== Personnel ==
- Travis Nesbitt - lead vocals
- Morgan Gies - lead & rhythm guitars
- Logan Jacobs - bass
- Ben Shillabeer - drums, percussion
- Produced by John Travis
- Mixed by Mike Fraser
- Additional Production on “Satisfied” & “I’m Not Ok” by Logan Jacobs
