= Cut the Crap (Jackyl album) =

Studio album by Jackyl
- Released: October 14, 1997
- Recorded: 1997; Cock Of the Walk Studios, Atlanta, Georgia
- Genre: Hard rock
- Label: Epic
- Producer: Mike Fraser

Jackyl chronology
Night of the Living Dead (1996)	Cut the Crap (1997)	Choice Cuts (1998)

Professional ratings
Review scores
Source	Rating
Allmusic	2.5/5 stars

Cut the Crap is a rock album released in 1997 by Southern rock band Jackyl and is their 3rd studio album.

== Track listing ==
Songs written by Jesse James Dupree unless noted.

1. "Dumb Ass Country Boy" – 2:49
2. "Locked and Loaded" (Dupree, Brian Johnson)
  - features Brian Johnson of AC/DC on vocals – 3:29
3. "Open Up" (Dupree, Dion Murdock) – 3:33
4. "Misery Loves Company" (Dupree, John Hayes) – 3:46
5. "Lets Don't Go There" (Dupree, Hayes) – 3:24
6. "Cut the Crap" – 2:04
7. "Twice as Ugly" (Dupree, Jeff Worley) – 4:09
8. "God Strike Me Dead" – 3:35
9. "Thanks For the Grammy" – 3:21
10. "Speak of the Devil" – 4:40 (Dupree, Dupree)
11. "Push Pull" – 3:55

== Personnel ==
- Jesse James Dupree - vocals
- Jeff Worley - lead guitar
- Jimmy Stiff - rhythm guitar
- Tom Bettini - bass
- Chris Worley - drums
- Brian Johnson - vocals on "Locked & Loaded"
- Tony Adams - percussion
- Produced, engineered and mixed by Mike Fraser
- John Kalodner - John Kalodner
