= À l'envers =

Studio album by Steeve Estatof
- Released: August 23, 2004
- Genre: Pop rock
- Label: Sony BMG

Steeve Estatof chronology
À l'envers (2004)	Poison Idéal (2008)

À l'envers is the debut studio album by French singer Steeve Estatof. It was released on 23 August 2004 via BMG France. The album received commercial success with 62,000 sales.

== Background ==
Estatof spoke of the album, he said "After the first bounty at Baltard, everyone loved me... Insults and criticism followed, and my parents even received threats... The problem is not celebrity, but badly educated people, who come to ask you when you go on TV. And who treat you right after 'sold'."

== Track listing ==
1. "Garde Moi"
2. "Je m'en foutre"
3. "Un peu de nous deux"
4. "Ma vie devant toi"
5. "Le succès rend con"
6. "Stella"
7. "Enfin"
8. "Le temps, Le héros"
9. "Je n'entends rien"
10. "Si je reviens"
11. "1977"

== Charts ==
Chart	Peak positions
Belgium — Ultratop	31
France — Syndicat National de l'Édition Phonographique	5
Switzerland — Swiss Hitparade	21
