= Nigel Dupree Band =

American rock band

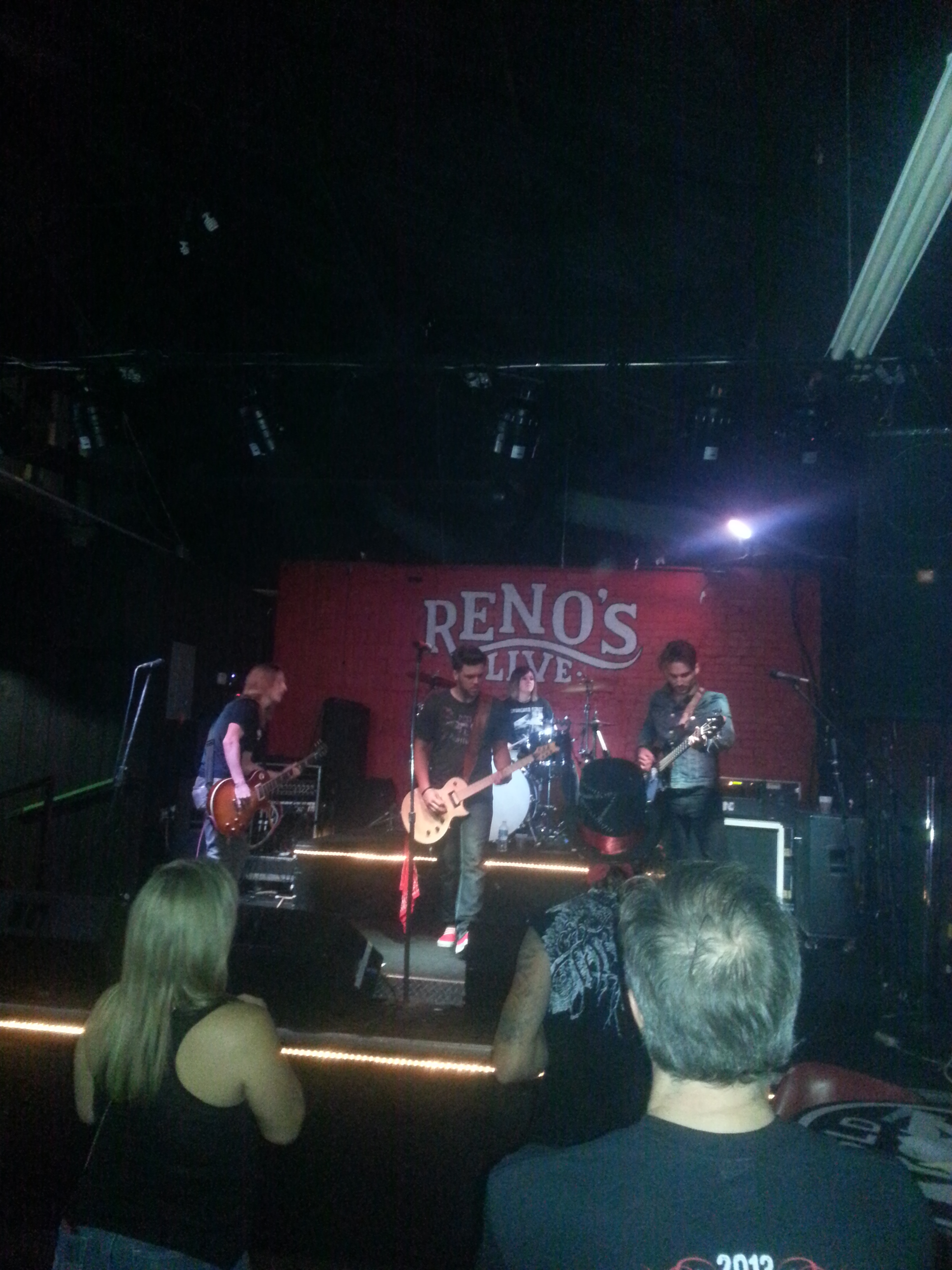
- Nigel Dupree Band performing at Reno's Chop Shop in Dallas, Texas

Background information
- Origin: Kennesaw, Georgia, U.S.
- Genres: Southern metal, southern rock, hard rock
- Years active: 2004–2017
- Label: Mighty Loud Records
- Members: Nigel Thomas Dupree
- Past members: Zak Herman; Kyle Cimino; Danny Lee; Sebastian James
- Website: www.facebook.com/NigelDupreeBand

Nigel Dupree Band is an American southern rock band from Kennesaw, Georgia, started by Nigel Thomas Dupree, the son of Jackyl lead vocalist Jesse James Dupree. Having performed at events such as Full Throttle Saloon, Rocklahoma and Taste of Madison, the band has released two studio albums, Attraction and Up to No Good.

== Discography ==
=== Studio albums ===
- Attraction (2009)
- Up to No Good (2012)

=== Videos ===
- "Tumbleweed" (2012)

== Band members ==
=== Current members ===
- Nigel Thomas Dupree – guitar, lead vocals

=== Former members ===
- David Buchanan- guitar
- Alex Foretich – bass
- Adam Townshend – drums
- Josh Hilton – bass
- Garrett Whitlock – drums
- Sebastian James – drums
- Kyle Cimino – guitar
- Zak Herman – guitar
- Danny Lee – bass
- Brandon Faulkner – drums
