= Rowyco =

Studio album by Jackyl
- Released: August 5, 2016
- Studio: Cock of the Walk Studios
- Genre: Hard rock
- Length: 40:56
- Label: Mighty Loud
- Producers: Jesse James Dupree; Jeff Tomei

Jackyl chronology
Best in Show (2012)	Rowyco (2016)

Rowyco is the eighth studio album by American southern rock band Jackyl. The album was released on August 5, 2016, by Mighty Loud Records.

== Track listing ==
No.	Title	Length
1.	"Disasterpiece"	4:04
2.	"Rally"	3:37
3.	"All Night Rodeo"	3:10
4.	"Ahead of My Time"	4:25
5.	"Just Because I'm Drunk"	5:04
6.	"Everyone's a Winner"	4:16
7.	"Crazy"	4:07
8.	"Hammer to the Head"	5:29
9.	"Limpdick"	3:03
10.	"Blast Off"	3:41
Total length:		40:56

== Charts ==
Chart (2016)	Peak position
US Billboard 200	181
