= Push Comes to Shove (Jackyl album) =

Studio album by Jackyl
- Released: August 2, 1994
- Recorded: The Warehouse Studio, Vancouver, British Columbia
- Genre: Hard rock
- Length: 52:21
- Label: Geffen
- Producer: Bruce Fairbairn

Jackyl chronology
Jackyl (1992)	Push Comes to Shove (1994)	Night of the Living Dead (1996)

Push Comes to Shove is the second album by the American hard rock band Jackyl, released in 1994. It peaked at No. 46 on the Billboard 200. The title track peaked at No. 7 on Billboard's Album Rock Tracks chart and No. 90 on the UK Singles Chart. The band supported the album by playing Woodstock '94 and touring with ZZ Top and Aerosmith.

Mike Fraser was nominated for a Juno Award, in the "Recording Engineer of the Year" category.

== Production ==
Recorded in Vancouver, the album was produced by Bruce Fairbairn. The band once again used a chainsaw as a musical instrument. Frontman Jesse James Dupree made an attempt to modify the screechiness of his vocals. Photos of Dupree's handlebar mustache were initially altered by the record company.

"Secret of the Bottle" is the band's version of a country ballad. "Rock-A-Ho" employs Native American stereotypes and clichés in its lyrics. "My Life" laments that classic rock radio stations don't play the music of new bands.

== Critical reception ==
Professional ratings
Review scores
Source	Rating
AllMusic	2.5/5 stars
The Atlanta Journal-Constitution	3.5/4 stars
The Encyclopedia of Popular Music	2/5 stars
Fort Worth Star-Telegram	2/5 stars
The Indianapolis Star	3/4 stars
Knoxville News Sentinel	1/5 stars
Pittsburgh Post-Gazette	1/4 stars

Entertainment Weekly wrote that the band members "lack the chops to even hint at Lynyrd Skynyrd-level Dixie-boogie greatness." The Dayton Daily News noted that Dupree's "grating, one-note range limits him to shrieking in tune." The Deseret News opined that "Dupree has perfected his mix of former AC/DC frontman Bon Scott's growling throat with the likes of Yosemite Sam."

The Knoxville News Sentinel determined that "these dumb-as-can-be songs feature easy to remember shout-along choruses, much like nursery rhymes have simple refrains so infant minds can connect." The Indianapolis Star concluded that "Push Comes to Shove becomes one of those guilty pleasures that sometimes must be indulged." The Ottawa Citizen deemed the album "a collection of gimmicky, foot-stomping AC/DC and Guns N' Roses riffs that are tailor-made for summertime hard-rock radio."

== Track listing ==
All songs written by Jesse James Dupree except as noted.

1. "Push Comes to Shove" - 3:05
2. "Headed for Destruction" - 5:14
3. "My Life" - 4:06
4. "I Could Never Touch You Like You Do" - 3:50
5. "Dixieland" - 6:01
6. "I Want It" - 5:04
7. "Private Hell" - 4:38
8. "I Am the I Am" - 3:42
9. "Secret of the Bottle" (J. J. Dupree, James Allen Dupree) - 5:27
10. "Rock-A-Ho" (J. J. Dupree, Jeff Worley, Chris Worley) - 3:50
11. "Back Down in the Dirt" - 4:02
12. "Chinatown" - 3:24
13. "Redneck Punk (live version) - 4:00 (Japanese bonus track)

== Credits ==
Band members

- Jesse James Dupree - vocals, chainsaw
- Jimmy Stiff - lead guitar
- Jeff Worley - rhythm guitar
- Tom Bettini - bass
- Chris Worley - drums

Guest musicians

- Randy Raine-Reusch - percussion on "Chinatown"

Production

- Produced by Bruce Fairbairn
- Engineered and mixed by Mike Fraser
- Assistant engineer: Mike Plotnikoff
- Recorded at the Warehouse Studio
- Mixed at Plant Recording Studios

== Certifications ==
Region	Certification	Certified units/sales
United States (RIAA)	Gold	500,000^{^}
^{^} Shipments figures based on certification alone.
