= A Year at the Movies =

Studio album by Social Code
- Released: May 11, 2004
- Recorded: 2004
- Genres: Alternative rock, pop punk
- Length: 35:46
- Label: Interscope
- Producers: Jeff Blue, Howard Benson

Social Code chronology
Patiently Waiting (2001)	A Year at the Movies (2004)	Social-Code (2007)

Professional ratings
Review scores
Source	Rating
Allmusic	3.5/5 stars
ArtistDirect	3.5/5 stars
CdUniverse	(4.2/5)

A Year at the Movies is the major label debut by the Canadian alternative/punk group Social Code, the band formerly known as Fifth Season. It was released in May 2004 in various countries, through Interscope. The first single from the album, "Beautiful", received significant play on radio stations throughout Canada. A music video was also released for the second single, "Whisper to a Scream (Birds Fly)", a cover of post-punk band The Icicle Works.

== Track listing ==
All tracks are written by Social Code.

No.	Title	Length
1.	"Beautiful"	2:34
2.	"Whisper to a Scream (Birds Fly)" (The Icicle Works cover)	2:31
3.	"Gone Away"	2:46
4.	"Cats and Dogs"	2:39
5.	"Miss You"	3:01
6.	"Perfect Grave"	3:11
7.	"Everything's Fine"	3:31
8.	"As Good As It Gets"	3:22
9.	"Flurry"	3:10
10.	"I Was Wrong"	2:46
11.	"Waiting"	3:17
12.	"No One to Save"	2:54

== Personnel ==
- Travis Nesbitt – lead vocals
- David Hesse – lead & rhythm guitars
- Logan Jacobs – bass
- Ben Shillabeer – drums, percussion
