= Steeve Estatof =

French singer-songwriter (born 1972)

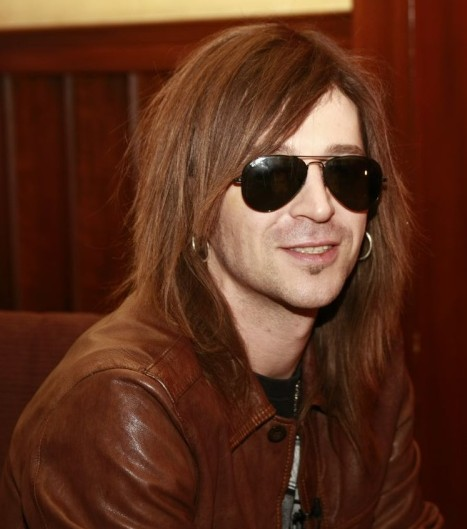
- Estatof (2008)

Background information
- Born: 29 October 1972 (age 53); Saint-Martin-d'Hères, Isère, France
- Occupations: Musician; songwriter
- Labels: Jive; Sony; BMG

Steeve Estatof (born 29 October 1972) is a French singer-songwriter and the winner of the second season of the French Idol show Nouvelle Star.

Estatof plays the guitar, the bass and drums. His music is strongly influenced by Nirvana, Guns N' Roses and the Sex Pistols.

His last album Le Poison idéal has been recorded in Los Angeles and has been mixed by Mike Fraser in Vancouver, Canada.

== Discography ==
=== Albums ===
| Title | Details | Peak chart positions | | |
| Title | Details | FRA | BEL | SWI |
|---|---|---|---|---|
| À l'envers | Released: 23 August 2004; Label: BMG France; Format: Digital download, CD | 5 | 31 | 21 |
| Poison Idéal | Released: 16 May 2008; Label: BMG France; Format: Digital download, CD | 68 | — | — |

=== Singles ===
| Title | Year | Peak chart positions | | |
| Title | Year | FRA | BEL | SWI |
|---|---|---|---|---|
| "Garde-moi" | 2004 | 4 | 17 | 17 |
| "1977" | 2004 | — | — | — |
| "Un peu de nous deux" | 2004 | — | — | — |
| "Ma Vie Devant Toi" | 2005 | 36 | — | — |
| "Kendy" | 2008 | — | — | — |
