= Jets Overhead =

Canadian rock band

- Jets Overhead (L–R: Jocelyn Greenwood, Luke Renshaw, Antonia Freybe-Smith, Piers Henwood, Adam Kittredge)

Background information
- Origin: Victoria, British Columbia, Canada
- Genres: Dream pop; alternative rock; pop rock; power pop
- Years active: 2003–present
- Labels: Microgroove Records (Canada); Warner Music Canada
- Members: Antonia Freybe-Smith; Adam Kittredge; Jocelyn Greenwood; Piers Henwood; Luke Renshaw
- Past members: Brendan Pye
- Website: jetsoverhead.com

Jets Overhead are a Canadian alternative rock band formed in 2003 and based in Victoria, British Columbia. As of 2026, they have released three studio albums, three EPs, and three compilation albums.

== History ==
=== Formation and debut ===
Jets Overhead was formed in 2003 by singer Adam Kittredge, guitarist Piers Henwood (cousin of Kittredge), bassist Jocelyn Greenwood (high school friend of Kittredge), and the band's first drummer, Brendan Pye. Soon after, vocalist Antonia Freybe-Smith joined, and Pye was replaced by Luke Renshaw. Kittredge came up with the name Jets Overhead while observing air traffic patterns in London, England.

The band's first release was 2003's self-titled EP, which reached No. 42 on the CMJ music charts.

=== Bridges: Early adoption of voluntary purchase model ===
In 2006, Jets Overhead made their first full-length album, Bridges, available for free download on their website under a voluntary purchase ("pay what you want") model, over a year before British rock group Radiohead eventually popularized the model with In Rainbows. Jets Overhead were eventually recognized as one of the first bands who attempted to address the challenges presented by digital music distribution and online trading, with the band's website stating at the time that "new systems for distributing music should be driven by the public rather than by existing paradigms which no longer apply to the digital world." Bridges was produced by Neil Osborne, lead singer of the Canadian rock group 54-40, and mixed by Warne Livesey. The album explores themes of island living and the west coast of Canada. It eventually led to the band's first Juno nomination, in 2007.

=== No Nations ===
Jets Overhead did not repeat their voluntary purchase model for the 2009 release of No Nations; however, elements of the album were made available on the band's website under a Creative Commons licence. The album was again produced by Neil Osborne, and mixing was done by Grammy winner Malcolm Burn. It was primarily recorded at a remote location on Hornby Island. The first single, "Heading for Nowhere", charted on Canadian rock radio and saw regular play on KCRW in Los Angeles. During the No Nations touring cycle, Jets Overhead made their first appearance at such prominent US festivals as Coachella and Bonnaroo. Prior to the album's release, vocalists Adam Kittredge and Antonia Freybe-Smith were married.

=== Boredom and Joy ===
Jets Overhead released their third studio album, Boredom and Joy, in 2012. It was produced by Emery Dobyns, who also contributed additional keyboards and percussion. The string arrangements on some tracks were done by Dobyns and Fran Healy.

The album was recorded in various locations, including the band's home studio in Victoria, British Columbia. Its themes revolve around the duality of life's mundane and joyful moments, which is reflected in the title track. The band has stated that they aimed to capture a more organic and live sound compared to their previous work.

== Touring and festivals ==
Jets Overhead have performed at Coachella, Bonnaroo, Sasquatch!, Expo 2010 Shanghai, SXSW, CMJ Music Marathon, North by Northeast, Canadian Music Week, the 2010 Winter Olympics, and the Bridge School Benefit, among other events. The band has toured internationally in the UK, Germany, Ireland, and China.

== Television and film ==
Jets Overhead songs have been featured on the television shows House, Bones, Pretty Little Liars, Whistler, Falcon Beach, Jozi-H, The Best Years, ReGenesis, and others.

== Collaborations and compilations ==
Antonia Freybe-Smith co-wrote and contributed vocals to the DJ Phynn track "Hello Love", which was released in 2010 by Black Hole Recordings, along with a remix by Mr. Pit. In 2006, the Grammy-nominated producer and DJ Morgan Page remixed the Jets Overhead song "All the People." In 2007, Jets Overhead contributed a cover of the Buffalo Springfield song "Mr. Soul" to Borrowed Tunes II: A Tribute to Neil Young, in support of the Bridge School. "Get It Right" was featured on the Canadian 2006 War Child benefit compilation Help!: A Day in the Life, along with Coldplay, Radiohead, City and Colour, and other artists.

== Awards and nominations ==
Jets Overhead were nominated for New Group of the Year at the 2007 Juno Awards. No Nations won Monday Magazine's Favorite Album of 2009. The music video for "Heading for Nowhere" was nominated for Music Video of the Year at the 2010 Leo Awards, and the video for "Sun Sun Sun" was voted as a top 20 video at the 2004 Indie Music Video Awards.

== Equipment ==
Jocelyn Greenwood plays a 1978 Rickenbacker 4001 bass through an Ampeg SVT cab, an Electro-Harmonix Hot Tubes pedal, and a Fender Blues Junior guitar amp. Her equipment provides the distinctive fuzzy bass sound on "Heading for Nowhere" and many of the band's recordings. On No Nations, Adam Kittredge and Luke Renshaw are both credited as playing an ARP Solina synthesizer.

== Band members ==
Current

- Antonia Freybe-Smith – vocals
- Jocelyn Greenwood – bass
- Piers Henwood – guitar
- Adam Kittredge – vocals
- Luke Renshaw – drums

Past

- Brendan Pye – drums

== Discography ==
=== Studio albums ===
- Bridges (2006)
- No Nations (2009)
- Boredom and Joy (2012)

=== EPs ===
- Jets Overhead (2003)
- Bystander (2011)

=== Compilations and live albums ===
- Lost Melodies: A Collection of Rarities, Demos, and Remixes (2007)
- Live at Sasquatch Festival 2010 (2010)
- The Timing: 15 Years of Jets Overhead (2018)

=== Singles ===
Year	Song	Chart peak	Album
Year	Song	CAN Alt	Album
2009	"Heading for Nowhere"	26	No Nations
2011	"Bystander"	49	Bystander
2012	"Boredom and Joy"	29	Boredom and Joy
2018	"The Timing"	—	The Timing: 15 Years of Jets Overhead
"—" denotes a release that did not chart.

== See also ==
- Music of Canada
- Canadian rock
- List of Canadian musicians
- List of bands from Canada
- List of bands from British Columbia
