= Drama Queen (Neurosonic album) =

Studio album by Neurosonic
- Released: September 5, 2006 (CA); January 30, 2007 (US)
- Genre: Alternative metal
- Label: Bodog Music
- Producer: Jason Darr

Professional ratings
Review scores
| Source | Rating |
|---|---|
| AllMusic | 4.5/5 stars |

Drama Queen is Canadian band Neurosonic's debut and only album. It peaked at number 9 on the Billboard Top Heatseekers album chart.

== Track listing ==
All songs by Jason Darr, except where noted.

1. "So Many People" - 2:42
2. "Are Solar" - 3:29
3. "I Will Always Be Your Fool" - 3:50
4. "Me Myself And I" (Darr, Peter Karrol) - 4:15
5. "Crazy Sheila" - 3:10
6. "Until I Die" - 3:58
7. "Fearless" - 3:14
8. "Boneheads" - 4:06
9. "Frankenstein" - 3:55
10. "So Now You Know" - 4:32
11. "For The Boy" - 4:02

== Album credits ==
=== Musicians ===
- Jason Darr - lead vocals, guitar, bass, piano
- Troy Healy - guitar
- Mike Wall - bass, backup vocals
- Shane Smith - drums
- Cassandra Ford - backup vocals
