= Social Code =

Canadian rock band

Background information
- Also known as: Fifth Season (1999–2003)
- Origin: St. Albert, Alberta, Canada
- Genres: Alternative rock, hard rock
- Years active: 1999–2012
- Labels: Universal, Interscope, Fontana North
- Members: Travis Nesbitt; Morgan Gies; Logan Jacobs; Ben Shillabeer; Steve Faulkner
- Past members: David Hesse; Chris Ruddy; Andrew Patrick
- Website: socialcodemusic.com

Social Code (formerly known as Fifth Season) was a Canadian alternative rock group formed in 1999 in St. Albert, Alberta.

== History ==
=== Formation and early years (1999–2003) ===
The band was formed in 1999 by high school friends Travis Nesbitt (lead vocals) and Logan Jacobs (bass), under the name Fifth Season. Later on, David Hesse joined as a guitarist, and Ben Shillabeer as a drummer.

The band's first album, Patiently Waiting, was released in 2001. After the release of the album, the band decided to change its name upon finding a popular band under the same name overseas, and so they came up with the new name Social Code.

=== Signing to Interscope Records and major label releases (2003–2008) ===
The band then landed a record deal with Interscope at the end of 2003, where they released their major label debut, A Year at the Movies. In May 2004, the band went on to do opening shows with such bands as Rise Against, Fall Out Boy, Deftones, and Good Charlotte, among others.

In 2007, the St. Albert foursome took on the task of creating a new record on their own. Social Code's previous experience working with high-profile producers, such as Howard Benson (The All-American Rejects, Hawthorne Heights, My Chemical Romance) in Los Angeles gave the band the experience and confidence to go it alone. They gutted the basement of Jacobs' house, built a studio and spent the next year working on their second album called Social-Code that was released in May 2007, in Canada. The album was successful in Canada, and spawned the successful singles "Bomb Hands", "The Shortest Line", "Everyday (Late November)", and "He Said, She Said". Supporting the album, the band toured with Sum 41 and Finger Eleven on their Strength In Numbers Tour.

=== Rock 'N' Roll (2009–2012) ===
The band reported on April 3, 2009 that mixing of their newest album, Rock 'N' Roll, was completed. The album was produced by John Travis (Kid Rock, Buckcherry) in Edmonton and mixed by Mike Fraser (AC/DC, Hinder, Aerosmith). It was announced on their Myspace page that the new album will be released on September 1, 2009, with the first single "Satisfied", released on iTunes on July 28, 2009, and a supporting tour coming in mid-September, following the album's release. Following the release of the album, the band toured in Canada with several other high-profile bands, such as Buckcherry and Rev Theory. Later in 2009, the band added Steve Faulkner as an additional guitarist.

Through 2010, the band continued to support the release of the album, headlining a Canadian tour in January 2010, with support act Ten Second Epic, opening for Buckcherry in May 2010, and supporting Airbourne on their major Canadian tour in July–August 2010, along with Bleeker Ridge. In October 2010, the band played the indie and electronica Java Rockin' Land festival in Jakarta, Indonesia, alongside such bands as Smashing Pumpkins, Wolfmother, Stereophonics, The Vines, Stryper, Dashboard Confessional, Superman Is Dead, Datarock, Mutemath, Arkarna, and more.

On June 6, 2012, Social Code announced a permanent hiatus, and that the members were moving on to individual projects. Travis and Morgan founded the electro rock trio SIIINES.

== Band members ==
Final line-up

- Travis Nesbitt - lead vocals (1999–2012)
- Morgan Gies - lead & rhythm guitars (2005–2012)
- Logan Jacobs - bass (1999–2012)
- Ben Shillabeer - drums, percussion (2003–2012)
- Steve Faulkner - rhythm & lead guitars (2009–2012)

Former members

- David Hesse - lead & rhythm guitars (1999–2004)
- Chris Ruddy - lead & rhythm guitars (2004–2005)
- Andrew Patrick - drums, percussion (1999–2003)

== Discography ==
- Patiently Waiting (2001, as Fifth Season)
- A Year at the Movies (2004)
- Social-Code (2007)
- Rock 'N' Roll (2009)
