= Poison Idéal =

Studio album by Steeve Estatof
- Released: May 16, 2008
- Studio: Squeak E Clean, Los Angeles; Mothership, Los Angeles; Claudia Sound Studios, Paris; The Warehouse, Vancouver
- Genre: Pop rock
- Language: French
- Label: Sony BMG
- Producer: David Corcos

Steeve Estatof chronology
| À l'envers (2004) | Poison Idéal (2008) |

Poison Idéal is the second studio album by French singer Steeve Estatof. The album, reaching 68th on the French chart, was released on 16 May 2008 via Sony BMG.

== Track listing ==
| No. | Title | Writer(s) | Length |
|---|---|---|---|
| 1. | "Real TV" | Steeve Estatof | 3:55 |
| 2. | "Kendy" | Roman Chelminski, Estatof | 2:53 |
| 3. | "Bomb Baby" | Estatof, Ace Finchum, Kim Hooker, Jay Pepper, Pepsi Tate | 4:19 |
| 4. | "Viens Te Faire Chahuter" | Michel Polnareff | 4:40 |
| 5. | "L'Ange Noir" | Estatof, Michael Pastorelli, Dominique Romey, Virginie Sallet | 5:11 |
| 6. | "Le Monde" | Estatof | 3:37 |
| 7. | "L'Amour Ne Vaut Rien" | Estatof, Cyril Nobilet | 3:32 |
| 8. | "Les Maux Les Poissons" | Estatof | 3:27 |
| 9. | "Jours Après Nuit" | Chelminski, Estatof | 3:39 |
| 10. | "Sous Hypnoz" | Estatof, Benjamin Tesquet | 2:19 |
| 11. | "Tout Détruire" | Estatof | 2:06 |
| 12. | "Bye Bye Girl" | Cliff Estatof, Mike Estatof, S. Estatof | 4:16 |
| 13. | "Un Idéal" | C. Estatof, S. Estatof, Sallet, Marc Volta | 4:14 |

- "Bomb Baby" contains an interpolation of Tigertailz' 1989 single "Love Bomb Baby", written by Ace Finchum, Kim Hooker, Jay Pepper & Pepsi Tate.
- "Viens Te Faire Chahuter" is a cover of Michel Polnareff's 1985 single.

== Charts ==
| Chart | Peak positions |
|---|---|
| France — Syndicat National de l'Édition Phonographique | 68 |
