= Syndicate (group) =

Australian rock band

- Origin: Sydney Australia
- Genres: Rock
- Years active: 2010–2011
- Labels: Sony Music Australia

Syndicate were a short lived Australian rock group. They released one studio album in 2011, which peaked at number 20 on the ARIA Charts. The group supported Alice Cooper, on his 2011 Australian tour.

== History ==
Syndicate were made up of five musicians from Sydney. They signed with Sony Music, before travelling to Los Angeles to write and record their debut album. They recorded part of the album in Tommy Lee's home studio in Calabasas. In 2011, lead singer Greg Agar, reflected saying, "The whole Los Angeles experience was incredible from day one. It was kind of weird having it sink in that we were in Hollywood recording an album but we spent every day in the studio working towards the goal."

On returning to Australia in late 2010, Syndicate released their debut single "Shout", which debuted at number 46 on the ARIA Charts with 3039 sales. The group released a second single "All My Life" in May 2011.

In July 2011, Syndicate released their debut self-titled album, which peaked at number 20 on the ARIA Charts. They supported the album with a national tour.

== Discography ==
=== Albums ===
List of albums, with selected chart positions
Title	Album details	Peak chart positions
Title	Album details	AUS
Syndicate	Released: July 2011; Format: CD; Label: Sony (88697834692)	20

=== Charting singles ===
List of singles, with selected chart positions
Title	Year	Chart positions	Album
Title	Year	AUS	Album
"Shout"	2010	46	Syndicate
