= Jackyl =

American rock band

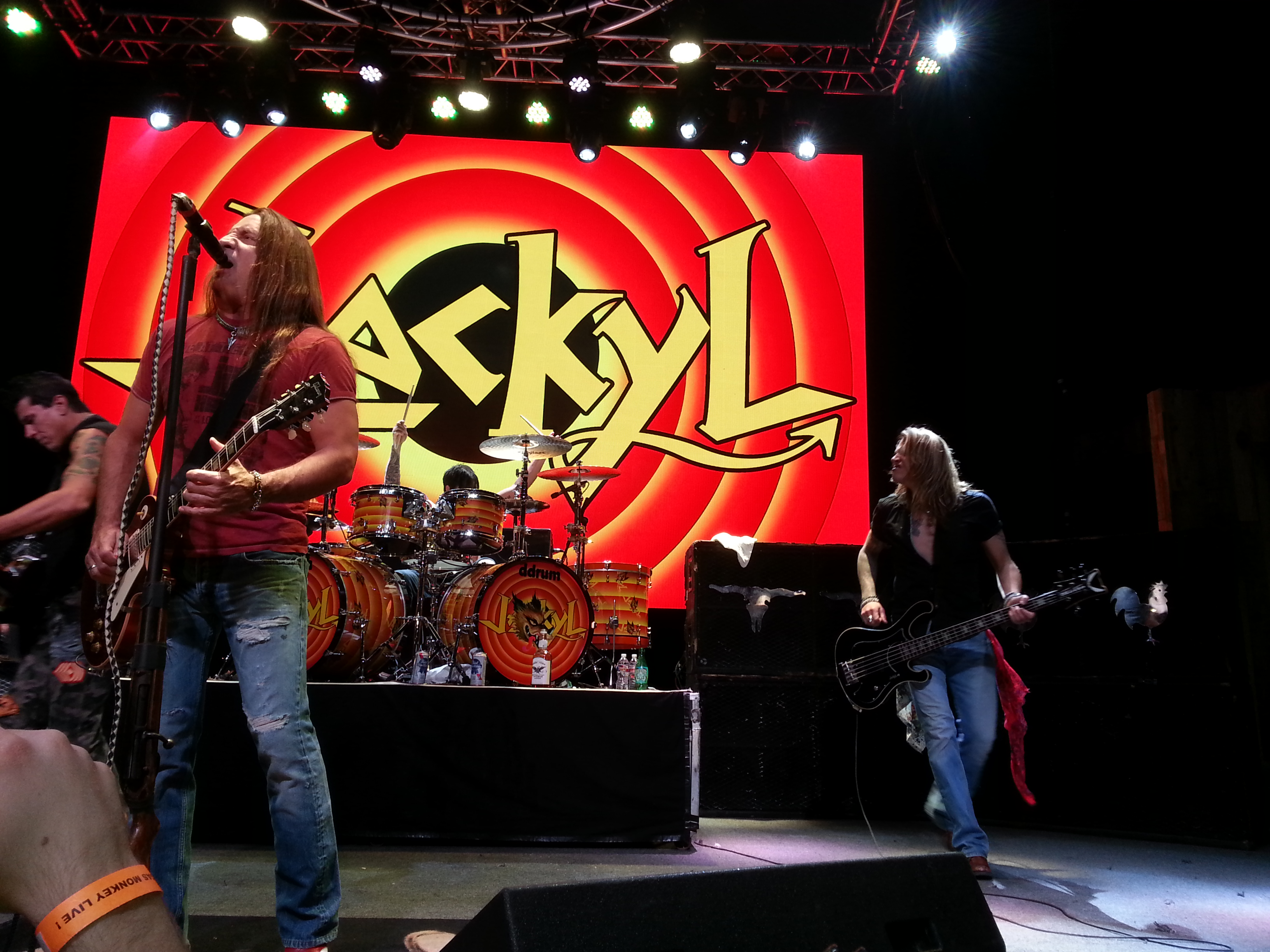
- Jackyl performing in 2014

Background information
- Origin: Kennesaw, Georgia, U.S.
- Genres: Hard rock; glam metal; Southern rock
- Years active: 1991–present
- Labels: Geffen; Mighty Loud; Epic; Sanctuary
- Members: Jesse James Dupree; Jeff Worley; Chris Worley; Roman Glick
- Past members: Jimmy Stiff; Thomas Bettini; Ronnie Honeycutt
- Website: jackyl.com

Jackyl is an American rock band formed in Kennesaw, Georgia in 1991. They play a fusion of glam metal and Southern rock. Their self-titled debut album has sold more than a million copies in the United States with hit singles like "Down on Me" and "When Will It Rain". The band is best known for the song "The Lumberjack", which features a chainsaw solo by lead singer Jesse James Dupree.

== History ==
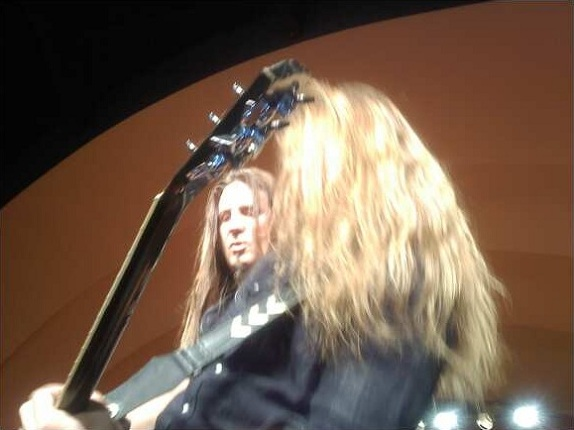
Dupree of Jackyl performing with son Nigel Thomas Dupree of Nigel Dupree Band

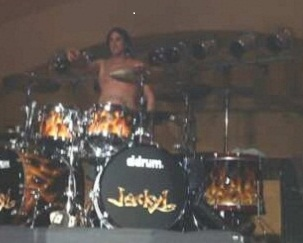
Chris Worley

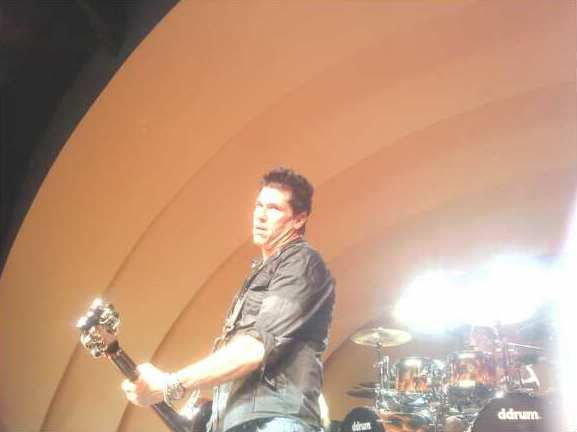
Jeff Worley

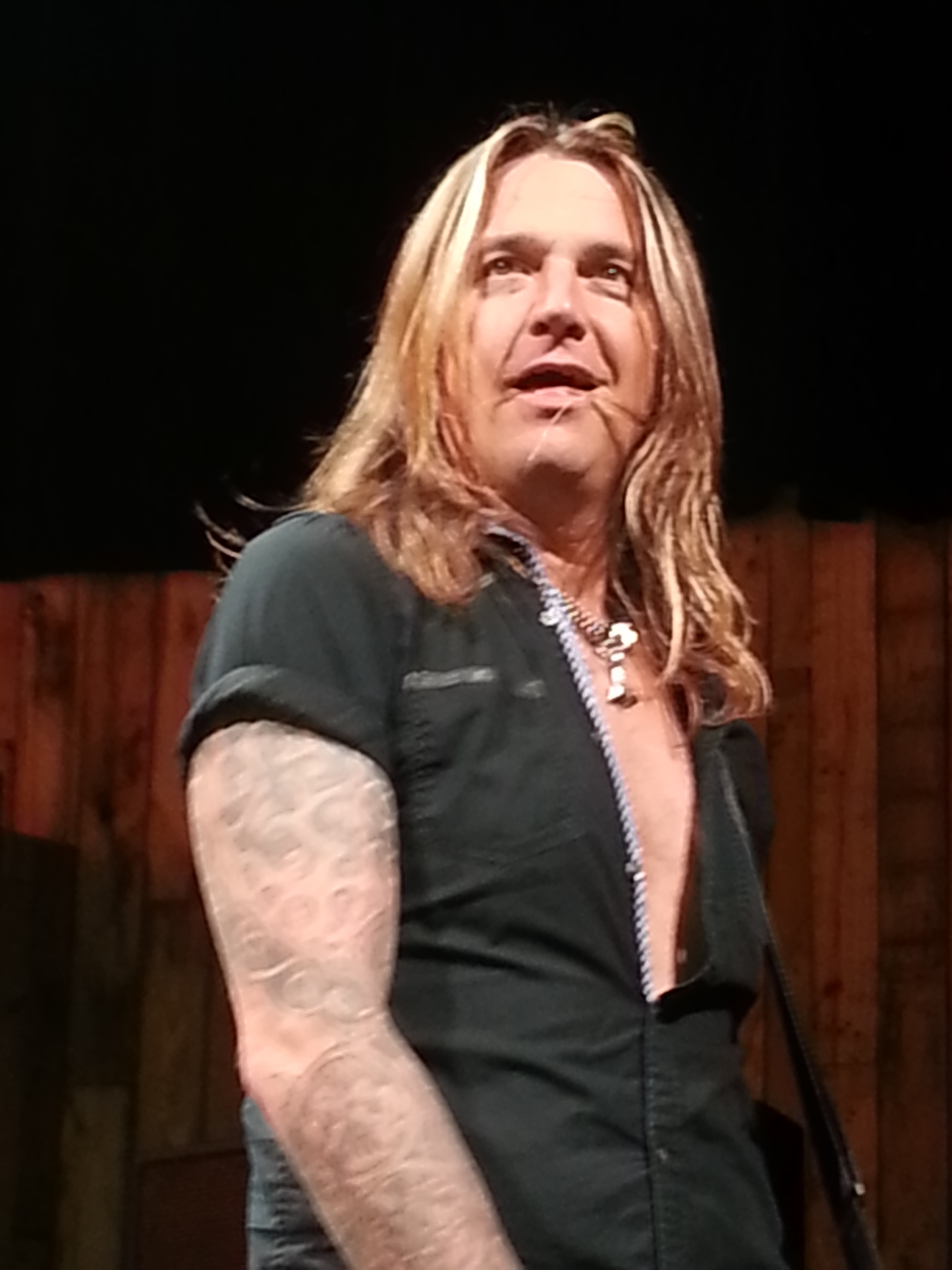
Roman Glick

=== 1990s ===
In 1992, Jackyl's self-titled debut album was released under Geffen Records, and eventually went platinum. It features a song entitled "She Loves My Cock", which was omitted from edited versions, as were suggestive elements on the album's cover art. When a Kmart in Georgia refused to sell Jackyl, the band played an impromptu concert in front of the store. Footage of the event was used for the music video of their single "I Stand Alone".

Their second album released in 1994 is titled Push Comes to Shove. Also that year, the band appeared at Woodstock '94 in Saugerties, New York. The album contains the singles "Push Comes to Shove" and "Headed for Destruction". Jackyl released Cut the Crap in 1997. Its hit song "Locked and Loaded" featured guest vocals from AC/DC's Brian Johnson. Johnson also teamed up with the band for their 2002 album Relentless.

The band's first greatest hits album, Choice Cuts, arrived in 1998. Geffen Records produced a music video for their cover of We're an American Band, a 1970s hit song by Grand Funk Railroad.

Choice Cuts failed to revive the band's sales and touring success, so Geffen Records and JACKYL parted company. Later that year, Stayin' Alive was released by their new record-label, Shimmer Tone. Recognized as Jackyl's fourth studio album, of the eleven tracks, three are covers of other bands' songs, and three are live versions of previously released songs.

=== 2000s ===
In 2000, lead singer Dupree recorded a solo album entitled Foot Fetish.

Less than a month after the events of the September 11, 2001 attacks, Jackyl recorded and released "Open Invitation", which received wide airplay and featured lyrics that included, "I hate you bin Laden" and "You've got an open invitation to kiss our ass." The song mixed in clips from George C. Scott's portrayal of George S. Patton giving a speech to his soldiers in the movie Patton and President George W. Bush reading from the Bible's Shepherd's Psalm Psalm 23:4. The band has described their song and lyrics as: "This song is written in the key of 'ANGER' that such a thing can happen in this country. It's not directed toward any religious group or race of people. It is directed toward those 'assholes' responsible."

In 2002, Jackyl released Relentless and took part in the Rock Never Stops Tour. A music video for "Billy Badass" was made.

The following year, a second greatest hits compilation was produced entitled 20th Century Masters – The Millennium Collection: The Best of Jackyl.

=== 2010s ===
In 2010, the band released When Moonshine and Dynamite Collide, releasing several singles and music videos to promote it such as the hit "Just Like A Negro" featuring Run-D.M.C.

In December 2011 Dupree appeared in That Metal Show where talked about chainsaws, his recent injuries, marathon touring and all things of Jackyl with Sully Erna from Godsmack and Glenn Hughes as guests too.

Later on in 2012, the band started working on a new album, and laid down tracks for a song called "Screwdriver" which is to be released on their album Best in Show on July 31, 2012. For the first time, in honor of Father's Day, Jackyl and Nigel Dupree Band (the latter fronted by vocalist Nigel Thomas Dupree, son of Dupree) were releasing their studio albums simultaneously. Best in Show and Up to No Good (the latter being the 2012 album from the Nigel Dupree Band) were set to be released on July 31, 2012. The first singles from Best in Show and Up to No Good, titled "Screwdriver" and "Tumbleweed", respectively, were issued concurrently on June 17, 2012, with an add date at radio of June 26, 2012. It also was released "Favorite Sin" as radio single charting No. 42 in US Mainstream Rock Chart.

In May 2016, the ensemble announced that they plan to release a studio album entitled Rowyco in the latter part of the year. The album was released on August 5, 2016. *Rated as one of the top 5 best rock albums of 2016/2017.

=== 2020s ===
In 2022, Jackyl celebrated their 30th anniversary with the release of the compilation album 30 Coming in Hot on August 12th. The album included three new songs. The band also announced tour dates for the summer and fall.

== Musical style and influences ==
The band's sound is rooted in southern rock and heavy metal music. AllMusic described the sound as "raunchy, fun-loving, and hard-hitting." Initially inspired by AC/DC and Lynyrd Skynyrd, the band began its career by fusing elements of hard rock with Southern boogie.

The band has used chainsaws on stage and has substituted guitars with them for solo sections. Depree uses the chainsaw as a musical instrument on the song "The Lumberjack." He also uses the chainsaw to cut up wooden stools during live performances.

== Legacy ==
Jackyl set two Guinness world records in 1998: one for playing 100 concerts in 50 days, and one for performing 21 concerts in a 24-hour period.

In the liner notes of anthology Jackyl 25, Dupree claims to have broken a chainsaw while attempting to surprise a group of radio programmers in a LongHorn Steakhouse. This resulted in a lawsuit that cost the band $1 million.

Dupree and Jackyl appeared on TruTV's Full Throttle Saloon, a reality show, which documented the happenings at a South Dakota saloon of the same name during the Sturgis Motorcycle Rally. Dupree is friends with the saloon owner, Mike Ballard, and also produced the show.

== Band members ==
=== Current ===
- Jesse James Dupree – lead vocals, rhythm guitar, gas chainsaw, tambourine, megaphone (1991–present)
- Jeff Worley – guitar, backing vocals (1991–present)
- Chris Worley – drums, backing vocals (1991–present)
- Roman Glick – bass, backing vocals (2002–present)

=== Former ===
- Jimmy Stiff – lead guitar, backing vocals (1991–1999)
- Ronnie Honeycutt (died 2024) – lead vocals
- Thomas Bettini – bass (1991–1999)
- Cliff Witherspoon – bass
- Jamie Taylor - rhythm guitar

== Discography ==
=== Studio albums ===
Year	Album	US	US Heat.	US Indie	Certification	Label
1992	Jackyl	76	1	-	Platinum	Geffen
1994	Push Comes to Shove	46	-	-	Gold	Geffen
1997	Cut the Crap	133	-	-	-	Epic
1998	Stayin' Alive	-	-	-	-	Shimmer Tone
2002	Relentless	-	-	41	-	Humidity
2010	When Moonshine and Dynamite Collide	192	-	31	-	Mighty Loud
2012	Best in Show	84	-	-	-	Mighty Loud
2016	Rowyco	181	-	-	-	Mighty Loud

=== Other albums ===
Year	Album	Label
1996	Night of the Living Dead [live]	Mayhem
1998	Choice Cuts [best-of]	Geffen
2003	20th Century Masters – The Millennium Collection: The Best of Jackyl	Geffen
2004	Live at the Full Throttle Saloon	Sanctuary
2014	10 Live!	Sanctuary Records Group
2017	Jackyl 25	Mighty Loud
2022	30 Coming In Hot	Mighty Loud

=== Singles ===
Year	Title	US Main	AUS	UK	Album
1992	"The Lumberjack"	24	92	-	Jackyl
1992	"I Stand Alone"	32	-	-	Jackyl
1992	"Down on Me"	10	-	-	Jackyl
1992	"Dirty Little Mind"	35	-	-	Jackyl
1993	"When Will it Rain"	11	-	-	Jackyl
1994	"Push Comes to Shove"	7	-	90	Push Comes to Shove
1994	"Headed for Destruction"	35	-	-	Push Comes to Shove
1997	"Dumb Ass Country Boy"		-		Cut the Crap
1997	"Locked and Loaded (ft. Brian Johnson)"	15	-	-	Cut the Crap
1997	"Open Up"	-	-	-	Cut the Crap
1998	"We're an American Band"	31	-	-	Choice Cuts
2002	"Kill the Sunshine" (ft. Brian Johnson)	39	-	-	Relentless
2009	"My Moonshine Kicks Your Cocaine's Ass"	-	-	-	When Moonshine and Dynamite Collides
2010	"She's Not a Drug"	-	-	-	When Moonshine and Dynamite Collides
2010	"Just Like a Negro (ft. DMC)"	-	-	-	When Moonshine and Dynamite Collides
2011	"Deeper in Darkness"	-	-	-	When Moonshine and Dynamite Collides
2012	"Screwdriver"	-	-	-	Best in Show
2013	"Favorite Sin"	-	-	-	Best in Show
2016	"Rally"	-	-	-	Rowyco
2016	"Blast Off"	-	-	-	Rowyco
2016	"Just Because I'm Drunk"	-	-	-	Rowyco
