= Game of Fools =

Studio album by Koritni
- Released: 16 March 2009
- Recorded: Origami Studios, Sutherland NSW, Australia; Hipposonic Studios, Vancouver British Columbia, Canada
- Genre: Hard rock
- Length: 50:11
- Label: Bad Reputation
- Producer: Anton Hagop / Lex Koritni

Koritni chronology
Lady Luck (2007)	Game of Fools (2009)

Professional ratings
Review scores
Source	Rating
HardRockHideout	8.5/10 stars

Game of Fools is the second album of the hard rock band Koritni. The Album was released on 16 March 2009 by the record label Bad Reputation.

== Track listing ==
1. "155" – 4:05
2. "Stab in the Back" – 3:42
3. "Roll the Dice" – 4:13
4. "V8 Fantasy" – 3:32
5. "You VS Me" – 4:12
6. "By My Side" – 3:51
7. "Deranged" – 3:39
8. "Nobody's Home" – 3:03
9. "Game of Fools" – 4:02
10. "Keep Me Breathing" – 4:22
11. "Tornado Dreaming" – 4:22
12. "Tornado Dreaming II" – 4:08
13. "The Devil's Daughter" – 4:20
- All songs composed by Lex Koritni and Eddy Santacreu.

== Personnel ==
- Lex Koritni – Vocals
- Chris Brown – Drums
- Luke Cuerten – Rhythm Guitar
- Eddy Santacreu – Lead Guitar
- Matt Hunter – Bass guitar
