= Koritni =

Australian rock band

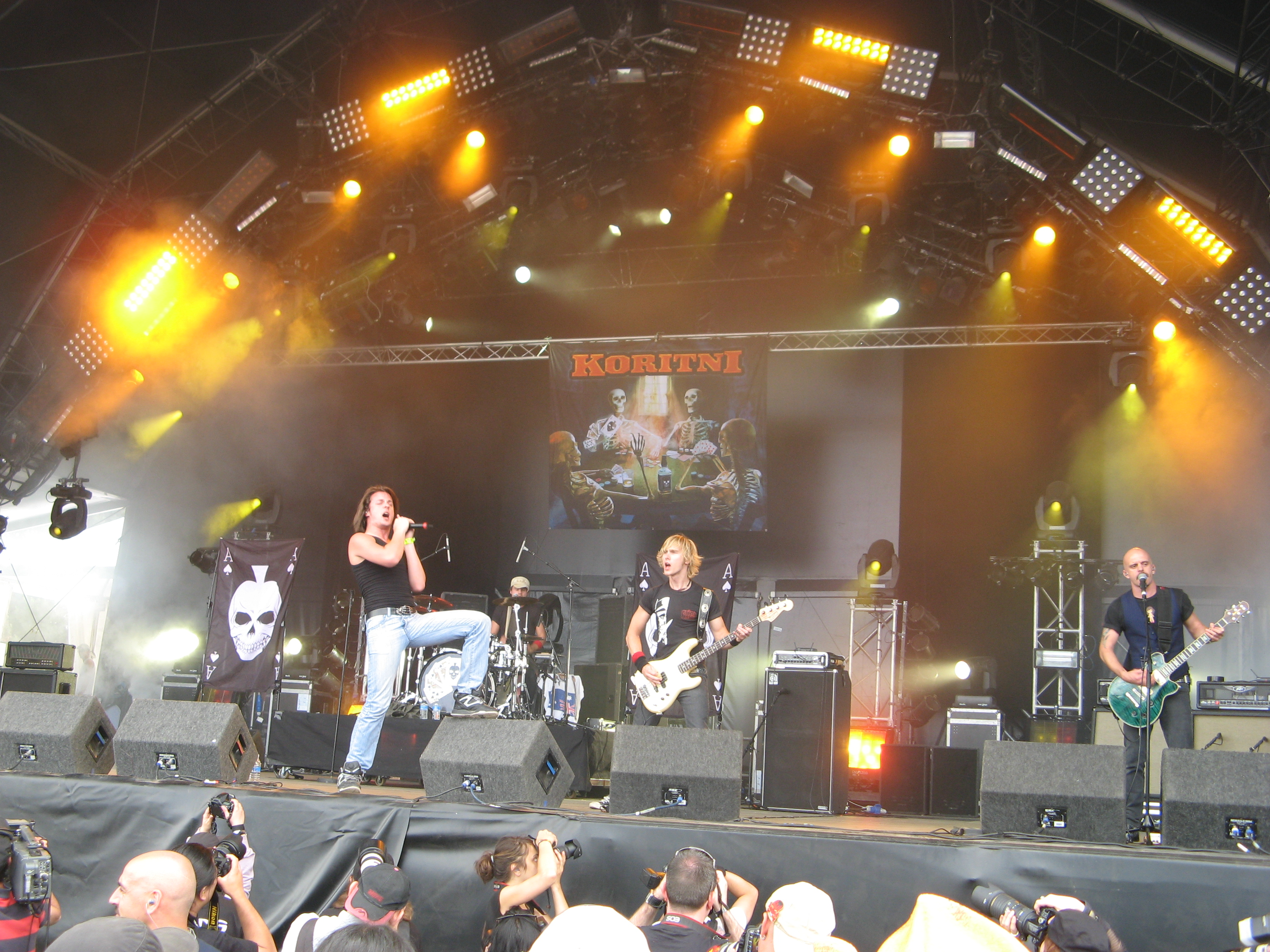
- Koritni at Hellfest 2009

Background information
- Origin: Sydney, Australia
- Genres: Hard rock, blues rock, sleaze rock
- Years active: 2006–present
- Label: Bad Reputation
- Members: Lex Koritni; Chris Brown; Matt Hunter; Eddy Santacreu; Luke Cuerden
- Website: koritni.com

Koritni is an Australian rock band from Sydney, descended from the band Green Dollar Colour.

== History ==
After the breaking-up of Green Dollar Colour, Lex Koritni decided to form a new band. Helped by the French guitar player Eddy Santacreu, bassist Matt Hunter, rhythm guitarist Luke Cuerten and Chris Brown on drums, they formed the band Koritni in 2006. Mixing 70's hard rock and American sleaze rock, the band doesn't hide its preferences for bands such as Aerosmith, Guns N' Roses, Van Halen or AC/DC.

In 2007, Koritni released their first full-length album Lady Luck, praised by the press, Lady Luck was mixed by Mike Fraser (AC/DC, Aerosmith and Van Halen). Following the release of the album, the band undertook a European tour.

Early 2009, the band released their second album, Game of Fools, again mixed by Mike Fraser, the album is still in a hard rock vein that made them successful. Koritni is considered with bands like Airbourne or The Answer as the rebirth of hard rock.

On July 23, 2010, the album No More Bets was released, which contained the new song Dance Mamma Dance, some acoustic live versions of previously released songs, even one from Lex Koritni's previous band Green Dollar Colour (Emotional Audit), and some cover versions of songs by other artists, like Judas Priest's Living After Midnight, AC/DC's Rock'n'Roll Ain't Noise Pollution (acoustic), Bon Jovi's Wanted Dead Or Alive (acoustic), a rock version of Michael Jackson's Thriller as well as the "Dirty Dancing" song I've Had The Time Of My Life.

On March 12, 2012, another hard rocking album called Welcome To The Crossroads was released (the last one to be mixed by Mike Fraser), succeeded by the slightly mellower, bluesier Night Goes On For Days in 2015 and the rocking Rolling album in 2018.

After moving from Australia to France, bandleader Lex Koritni has surrounded himself with new musicians, drummer Daniel Fasano and guitarist Tom Fremont, with whom he recorded the album Long Overdue in 2022, published on April 14, 2023. Long Overdue was mixed by producer Kevin Shirley, who the band has been working with since 2015.

Shortly before the release of the album, bass player Mathieu Albiac was added to the band to complete the line-up.

Despite having new band members Koritni continues exactly in the same musical direction and the sound they have been known for.

== Members ==
- Lex Koritni – vocals, guitars (2006-present)
- Tom Fremont - guitars (2019-present)
- Mathieu Albiac- bass (2023-present)
- Daniel Fasano - drums (2021-present)
- Eddy Santacreu – guitars (2006-2021)
- Luke Cuerden – guitars (2006-2021)
- Chris Brown – drums (2006-2021)
- Dean Matt Hunter – bass (2006-2021)

French guitar player Manu Livertout replaced Luke Cuerden during the 2012 Tour.

In 2012 and 2014, French bass player and former Trust member Yves "Vivi" Brusco replaced Dean Matt Hunter during their European tours.

== Discography ==
- 2007: Lady Luck [Bad Reputation]
- 2008: Red Live Joint (CD+DVD) – live [Bad Reputation]
- 2009: Game of Fools [Bad Reputation]
- 2010: No More Bets [Bad Reputation]
- 2012: Welcome to the Crossroads [Verycords]
- 2013: Alive & Kicking (CD+DVD) – live [Verycords]
- 2015: Night Goes On For Days [Verycords]
- 2018: Rolling [Verycords]
- 2023: Long Overdue [Verycords]
