= Timberjack (disambiguation) =

Timberjack was a brand of forestry machinery.

Timberjack may also refer to:

- Timberjack, archaic term for a lumberjack
- Timberjack, a tool similar to a peavey
- Timberjack (film), a 1955 film starring Sterling Hayden
