= Foot Fetish =

Studio album by Jesse James Dupree
- Released: 2000
- Genre: Hard rock
- Length: 45:45
- Labels: V2; 27072
- Producers: Gregg Lindner, Mike Fraser

Foot Fetish is the first solo studio album by the Jackyl singer Jesse James Dupree, released in 2000.

"Mainline" peaked at No. 34 on the Billboard Mainstream Rock chart.

== Critical reception ==
Professional ratings
Review scores
Source	Rating
AllMusic	2.5/5 stars

AllMusic wrote that "songs such as the album-opening 'Mainline' and 'Losing My Mind' would've sounded splendid on Headbanger's Ball circa 1989." The Lincoln Journal Star thought that the album "finds a more musically mature, but still hard-rocking, Dupree playing a batch of songs he wrote for himself and not the band." The Times & Transcript called it a "cheesened lump of boozey bluesy riff-raffling mucho-macho metal pop drivel." The Daily Post stated that "the driving, unbridled strength of Dupree's music is not only catchy, but also rather addictive."

== Track listing ==
All songs written by Jesse James Dupree except where noted.

1. "Mainline" – 3:25 (Dupree/Wyzard)
2. "First Taste of Freedom" – 3:53
3. "Losing My Mind" – 3:39 (Dupree/Roman Glick)
4. "Second Chance" – 3:09
5. "Satisfied" – 2:56 (Dupree/D. Murdock)
6. "Devil's Advocate" – 4:31
7. "Reason" – 4:31 (Dupree/Joey Huffman)
8. "I Gotcha" – 3:04 (Joe Tex)
9. "I Don't Share Your Pain" – 4:05
10. "Let's Don't Go There" – 3:46 (Dupree/John Hayes)
11. "There Comes a Time" – 4:59 (Dupree/Hayes)
12. "Higher" – 3:47 (Sylvester Stewart)
- Track 8 originally recorded by Joe Tex
- Track 12 originally recorded by Sly & the Family Stone on the album Dance to the Music.

== Personnel ==
- Jesse James Dupree – vocals, rhythm guitar, percussion
- John Hayes – lead guitar
- Roman Glick – bass (tracks 2–4 & 6)
- Ivo Severijns – bass (tracks 1, 5 & 7–12)
- Tony Belser – drums
- Joey Huffman – keyboards

Production

- Mixing – Mike Fraser
- Engineer – Jesse James Dupree, Don Tart and Mike Fraser
