= 20th Century Masters – The Millennium Collection: The Best of Jackyl =

20th Century Masters – The Millennium Collection - The Best of Jackyl

Compilation album by Jackyl
- Released: March 18, 2003
- Genre: Hard rock
- Length: 44:26
- Label: Geffen

Professional ratings
Review scores
Source	Rating
AllMusic	3/5 stars

20th Century Masters - The Millennium Collection - The Best of Jackyl is a compilation album by American heavy-metal band Jackyl. It was released in March 2003 under Geffen Records.

== Track listing ==
No.	Title	Length
1.	"I Stand Alone"	3:57
2.	"Dirty Little Mind"	3:30
3.	"Down On Me"	4:01
4.	"When Will It Rain"	4:34
5.	"Redneck Punk"	3:39
6.	"The Lumberjack"	3:32
7.	"Push Comes to Shove"	3:05
8.	"Headed for Destruction"	5:11
9.	"I Could Never Touch You Like You Do"	3:49
10.	"Secret of the Bottle"	5:26
11.	"Rock-A-Ho"	3:42
