= Social-Code =

Social Code

Studio album by Social Code
- Released: May 8, 2007
- Genre: Alternative rock Pop punk
- Length: 33:21
- Label: Universal

Social Code chronology
A Year at the Movies (2004)	Social Code (2007)	Rock 'N' Roll (2009)

Social-Code is the second album by the Canadian alternative rock group Social Code under that name. It was released on May 8, 2007, exactly 3 years after the first album, in only Canada so far.
"Bomb Hands" was the official first single. The music video received significant play on MuchMusic. The next singles were "The Shortest Line", "Everyday (Late November)" and "He Said, She Said".

== Track listing ==
All tracks are written by Social Code.

No.	Title	Length
1.	"He Said, She Said"	3:16
2.	"Bomb Hands"	2:22
3.	"Everyday (Late November)"	3:22
4.	"The Shortest Line"	3:05
5.	"Forever Always Ends"	2:52
6.	"Don't Tell Me"	3:17
7.	"10 Seconds to Go"	3:08
8.	"Frayed"	3:07
9.	"Without You"	2:39
10.	"The Best You Never Had"	3:08
11.	"Forever Always Ends" (Acoustic)	3:00
12.	"Everyday (Late November)" (Acoustic) (Japanese bonus track)	3:24

== Singles ==
- "Bomb Hands"
- "The Shortest Line"
- "Everyday (Late November)"
- "He Said, She Said"

== Release history ==
Country	Date
Canada	May 8, 2007
Japan	November 12, 2008

== Personnel ==
- Travis Nesbitt - lead vocals
- Morgan Gies - lead & rhythm guitars
- Logan Jacobs - bass
- Ben Shillabeer - drums, percussion
