= Neurosonic =

Canadian rock band

- Origin: Vancouver, British Columbia, Canada
- Genres: Alternative metal Industrial rock
- Years active: 2006–2009
- Label: Bodog Music
- Members: Jason Darr; Troy Healy; Jacen Ekstrom; Shane Smith

Neurosonic was founded in Vancouver, British Columbia in February 2006, by vocalist/guitarist Jason Darr, who was the former lead singer of Calgary's Out of Your Mouth. In addition to Jason, Neurosonic also consists of guitarist Troy Healy, accompanying vocalist and bassist Jacen Ekstrom and Tama endorsed drummer Shane Smith from former bands SNFU, The Real Mckenzies and David Ogilvy's (Mixer/Producer of Nine Inch Nails, Marilyn Manson, and Mötley Crüe), Jakalope. Neurosonic released its first album, Drama Queen on January 30, 2007, on the Bodog Music label, although the album was released in September 2006 in Canada.

The multi-platform game, Scarface: The World Is Yours also features their song, "So Many People".

On April 28, 2007, Jason posted on Neurosonic's MySpace that they would be playing on the main stage at the 2007 Family Values Tour.

According to the Neurosonic biography on Bodog Music's site, Neurosonic is as "driven and unapologetic as its creator (Darr)." Neurosonic's musical style crosses many boundaries and while it is generally classified as alternative rock, it is also classified as hard rock, also containing elements of traditional rock and pop.

== Terrorist incident ==
In September 2006, Neurosonic was suspected by the United States' FBI as being terrorists when Jason's pedal board, which consisted of the board and wires in a hard case, was examined and subsequently seized by the TSA. Jason had taped Neurosonic's set list to the board, which consisted of most of the songs on Drama Queen. Some of the song names (i.e. "So Many People", "Until I Die", "Crazy Sheila", etc.) were mistaken by the FBI as being terrorist code, although Jason was able to explain the situation and the board was eventually returned.

== Major tours ==
In the late summer of 2007, Neurosonic guested at Korn's Family Values Tour along with Flyleaf, Trivium, Hellyeah, Atreyu, Evanescence, Droid, The Changing, and many more bands on the second stage such as Twin Method, Five Finger Death Punch, and Bloodsimple.

Neurosonic also toured with Puddle Of Mudd in 2008.

== Feuds ==
Pete Wentz of Fall Out Boy was rumored to have been in a feud with Neurosonic over the song "So Many People", which publicly bashes Wentz's ex-wife Ashlee Simpson. Reporting of the matter stemmed from Jason Darr jokingly saying that Fall Out Boy's bass player had filed a cease and desist order. Wentz responded with: "If your songs are good then sleep easy and have fun playing them - just don't attach me to them." While lead singer Jason Darr has spoken out, saying "Anyone silly enough to believe I was serious about the comment has no sense of humour. The song is tongue in cheek... meant to blow off steam about a subject that is laughable at best."

== Disbandment ==
On April 1, 2009, lead vocalist Jason Darr announced via the band's Myspace page that Neurosonic was officially over. Jason went on to say the band had been coming to that conclusion for a bit as several of the members married, one is soon expecting his first child, and all of them had been focused on other projects.

== New beginning ==
The band, minus Jason Darr, has reformed into the new band Crashscene. Their debut album released March 13, 2012.

== Chart information ==
Year	Album / Single	Peak Chart Positions			
Year	Album / Single	Billboard 200	Top Heatseekers (mountain)	US Mainstream Rock	US Modern Rock
2007	Drama Queen	-	9	-	-
2008	"So Many People"	-	-	30	-

== Band members ==
=== Current ===
- Jason Darr – lead vocals, guitar
- Troy Healy – guitar
- Shane Smith – drums

=== Former ===
- Mike Wall – bass guitar, vocals
- Scott McCarger – drums
- Jacen Ekstrom – bass guitar, vocals (deceased)
