= No Nations =

Studio album by Jets Overhead
- Released: June 2, 2009
- Recorded: Joe King Hall (Hornby Island, BC), Seacoast Sound (Victoria, BC), Alix Goolden Hall (Victoria, BC), Miramontes Drive (Victoria, BC), and Eldorbud Place (Victoria, BC) 2007–2008
- Genre: Dream pop, alternative rock
- Label: Microgroove
- Producer: Neil Osborne

Jets Overhead chronology
Bridges (2006)	No Nations (2009)	Live at Sasquatch Festival 2010 (2010)

Professional ratings
Review scores
Source	Rating
Allmusic	3/5 stars
Exclaim!	(Positive)

No Nations is the second album by the Canadian alternative rock band Jets Overhead. The album was released June 2, 2009 in Canada, with later release dates in the United States and worldwide. The band chose not to use the voluntary purchase model as they previously used for Bridges. However, the title track, "No Nations", was released as a free download under a Creative Commons license, as were the instrumental versions of all of the album's tracks.

The sound of the album continues in the vein of the group's debut LP, Bridges.

"Sure Sign" was featured on the Bones episode "The Predator in the Pool".

== Track listing ==
1. "I Should Be Born" – 4:26
2. "Heading for Nowhere" – 4:00
3. "Weathervanes (In the Way)" – 4:36
4. "No Nations" – 2:54
5. "Sure Sign" – 3:31
6. "Time Will Remember" – 4:20
7. "Fully Shed" – 5:10
8. "Always a First Time" – 3:02
9. "It's a Funny Thing" – 4:33
10. "Tired of the Comfort" – 6:51
- "I Should Be Born" and "Heading For Nowhere" were mixed by Mike Fraser.
