= Jackyl (album) =

Studio album by Jackyl
- Released: August 11, 1992
- Recorded: 1992
- Genres: Hard rock, hair metal
- Length: 42:48
- Label: Geffen
- Producer: Brendan O'Brien

Jackyl chronology
Jackyl (1992)	Push Comes to Shove (1994)

Jackyl is the debut album by American rock band Jackyl. It was released on August 11, 1992, on Geffen. The band supported the album with a North American tour.

== Background ==
The record's clean issuance omits "She Loves My Cock." Likewise, on the cover art of edited versions, the "Parental Advisory" logo in the background is altered to say "Meaty bones beware of Jackyl."

Music videos were made for the tracks "The Lumberjack" (featuring the band performing at a wooded shack, complete with the chainsaw solo), "I Stand Alone" (featuring the band performing in front of a K-Mart as a protest for the store refusing to sell their album), "Down On Me", "Dirty Little Mind", "When Will It Rain" and "Back Off Brother".

== Critical reception ==
Professional ratings
Review scores
Source	Rating
AllMusic	3/5 stars

The St. Petersburg Times opined that "Jackyl's lunacy is certainly inspired, and its self-deprecating attitude is refreshing."

== Track listing ==
All songs written by Jesse Dupree except as noted.

1. "I Stand Alone" - 3:58
2. "Dirty Little Mind" - 3:30
3. "Down on Me" - 4:03
4. "When Will It Rain" - 4:34
5. "Redneck Punk" (Jeff Worley/Ronnie Honeycutt) - 3:37
6. "The Lumberjack" - 3:32
7. "Reach for Me" (Jesse Dupree/John Hayes) - 3:34
8. "Back off Brother" - 3:25
9. "Brain Drain" (Jeff Worley/Jimmy Stiff) - 4:58
10. "Just Like a Devil" - 3:34
11. "She Loves My Cock" - 3:51

== Singles ==
Year	Title	Mainstream Rock Chart
1992	"The Lumberjack"	24
1992	"I Stand Alone"	32
1992	"Down on Me"	10
1992	"Dirty Little Mind"	35
1993	"When Will it Rain"	11

== Personnel ==
- Jesse James Dupree – vocals, chainsaw
- Jimmy Stiff – lead guitar
- Jeff Worley – rhythm guitar
- Thomas Bettini – bass
- Chris Worley – drums

== Certifications ==
Region	Certification	Certified units/sales
United States (RIAA)	Platinum	1,000,000^{^}
^{^} Shipments figures based on certification alone.
