= Bridges (Jets Overhead album) =

Studio album by Jets Overhead
- Released: (Canada) (United States) April 25, 2006 (United Kingdom) June 4, 2007
- Genres: Dream pop, alternative rock
- Length: 59:55
- Label: Microgroove
- Producer: Neil Osborne

Jets Overhead chronology
Jets Overhead (2003)	Bridges (2006)	No Nations (2009)

Professional ratings
Review scores
Source	Rating
Allmusic	(Not Rated) link
Pensatos	4/5 stars
Soul Shine Magazine	3/5 stars
Cord Magazine	(Positive)
Fast Forward Weekly	3/5 stars

Bridges is the debut album by the Canadian alternative rock band Jets Overhead. The album was released on April 25, 2006, in Canada and the United States on the Microgroove label. In addition to the traditional physical and digital download purchase formats, the album is available as a digital download on Jets Overhead's website, where one may download for whatever price they see fit, with no minimum.

The album was generally quite well received by critics, with the sound of the band being compared to other groups such as The Stills and Doves. "Where Did You Go?" was featured on the season six House episode, "Teamwork".

== Track listing ==
1. "This Way" – 5:53
2. "Killing Time" – 3:48
3. "All the People" – 4:40
4. "Seems So Far" – 4:32
5. "Shadow Knows" – 4:32
6. "Get It Right" – 3:47
7. "Bridges" – 5:11
8. "Life's a Song" – 3:25
9. "Blue Is Red" – 3:32
10. "Breaking to Touch" – 3:35
11. "White Out" – 4:30
12. "Where Did You Go?" – 3:59
13. "No More Nothing" - 8:24
