= Johnny Dare =

American radio personality

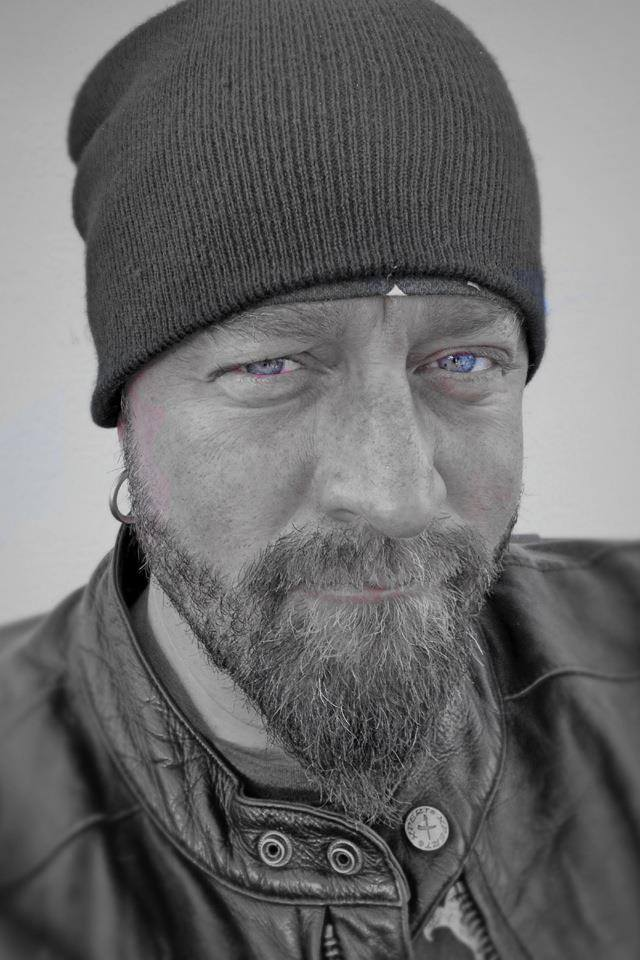
- Born: John William Caprefoli; August 27, 1968 (age 58); Memphis, Tennessee, U.S.
- Presenting career
- Show: The Johnny Dare Morning Show
- Station: 98.9 The Rock
- Time slot: Monday to Friday; 5:00 a.m. - 10:00 a.m.
- Style: Talk; Drive time Morning zoo Shock jock
- Country: United States
- Website: www.freejohnnydare.com

Johnny Dare (born John William Caprefoli; August 27, 1968) is an American radio personality. He was host of The Johnny Dare Morning Show the morning show for 98.9 The Rock in Mission, Kansas. He was let go on March 6, 2025 due to budget cuts from the parent company Audacy. He was one of the station's more prominent figures, and hosted the station's annual concert festival, Rockfest, which had grown to become the biggest one-day concert event in the country.

== Career ==
After cutting his teeth co-hosting a local segment on Kansas City affiliate for nationally syndicated radio network Z Rock, and working in the promotions department for local Top 40-turned-Young Country station KBEQ, Dare was hired by the late Doug Sorenson to work at the then one-year-old KQRC-FM.

Debuting on KQRC in 1993, The Johnny Dare and Murphy Morning Show quickly grew in popularity and has since consistently topped the Arbitron ratings for its time slot.

The show currently features (along with Dare), Nycki Pace, Kyle, Jake the Phone Snake and Gregg.

Despite a show that often pushes the envelope, with segments like "Naked Twister" that netted them a $220k fine from the Federal Communications Commission (FCC), the show gives back to the community through their "Hand Up Campaign", and with Dare's involvement as Honorary Chairman of the March of Dimes annual Bikers for Babies Ride.

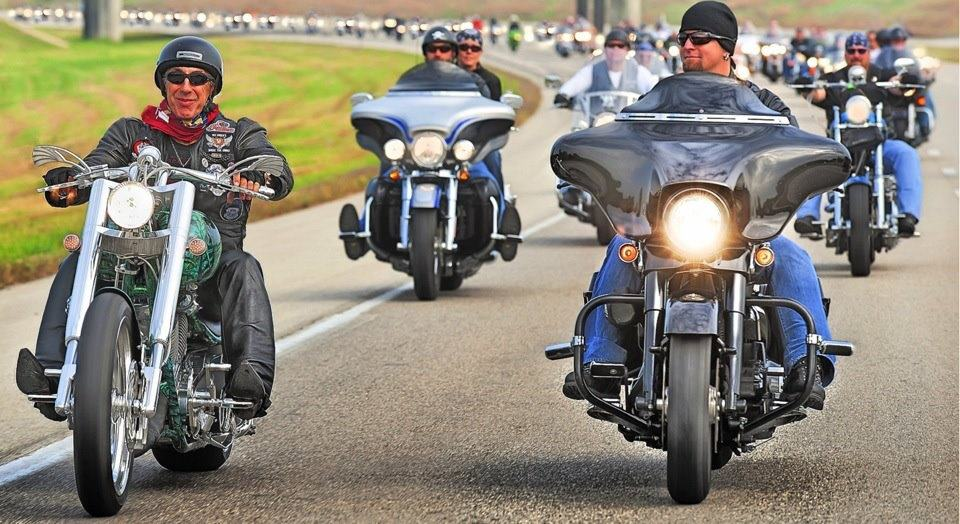
Johnny Dare and Dee Snider of Twisted Sister, during the Bikers For Babies motorcycle run

In 1996, Dare launched the Hope For The Holidays Campaign, helping individuals and families who aren't able to be helped by conventional charities. This eventually spawned the Hand Up Campaign, spreading the message year round.

Dare is also the narrator on the truTV series, Full Throttle Saloon which focuses on the Sturgis, SD based bar of the same name.

In 2010, Dare spearheaded a backlash against Kansas City Parks board member, Aggie Stackhaus for comments made after the 2010 edition of Rockfest, when rain, mud and 55,000 concert-goers resulted in damage to the park grounds. (The station had already made arrangements to repair the damage) Stackhaus later resigned.

As a result of layoffs from Audacy, his show, The Johnny Dare Morning Show, is no longer broadcast on 98.9 The Rock, with the final show on March 7, 2025.

== Controversy ==
In December 2004, the Federal Communications Commission proposed fines totaling $220,000 against Entercom Communications for alleged indecency violations during multiple broadcasts in April and May 2002 of the Morning Show on KQRC-FM in Kansas City, Kansas, and KFH-AM in Wichita, Kansas. The FCC claimed that the material included repeated graphic and explicit sexual descriptions that were pandering, titillating or used to shock the audience. As justification for proposing the maximum fine, the Commission noted "the egregious nature of the violations and Entercom's history of prior indecent broadcasts."

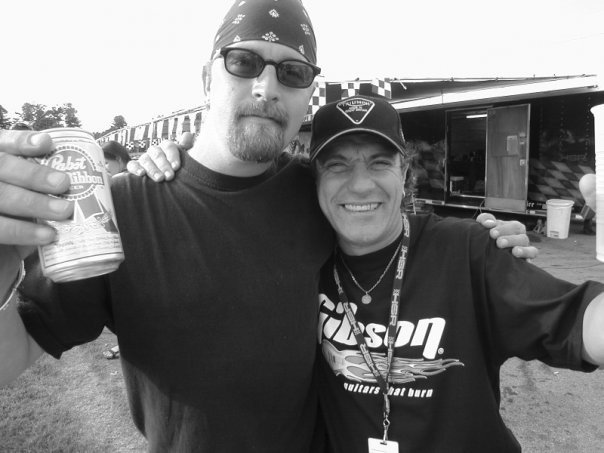
Johnny Dare with AC/DC frontman Brian Johnson

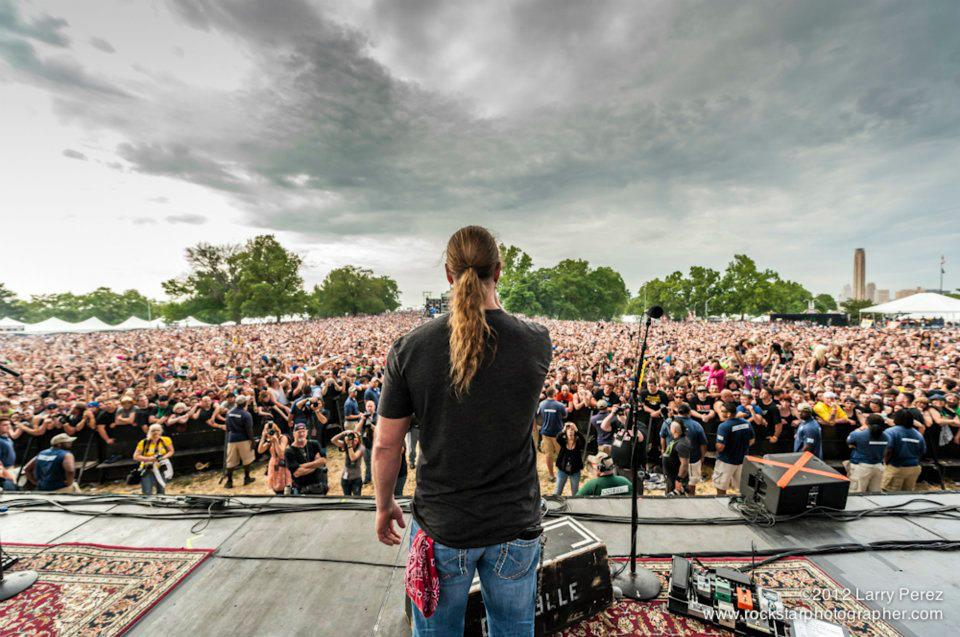
Johnny Dare addresses the crowd at Rockfest 2012

The commission's official notice ran 28 pages, including 18 pages of transcripts for the four alleged violations. The FCC rejected Entercom's contention that, because KQRC generally enjoys high ratings, "the contemporary community standards of the Kansas City listening community are such that the material is not patently offensive." Entercom further argued that the FCC's definition of indecency was "unconstitutionally vague and overbroad" citing Reno v. ACLU and Ashcroft v. Free Speech Coalition. The Commission said that the notion of contemporary standards is not different in different regions of the country, but reflects "an average broadcast listener" and isn't tied to "any particular geographic area."

In addition, the FCC said that a station's popularity does not reflect acceptance of the broadcast material by the local community; "Whether particular material is actionably indecent does not turn on whether the station that broadcast it [or the program] happens to be popular in its particular market." Finally, the Federal Communications Commission denied Entercom's assertions of the unconstitutionality of its definition of indecency, stating in conclusion, "The constitutional validity of the Commission's indecency standard has been repeatedly affirmed by the courts" and that Ashcroft v. Free Speech Commission and Reno v. ACLU did not alter this conclusion.

The FCC 'Notice of Apparent Liability For Forfeiture' dated December 22, 2004, asserts that the fines were assessed for four separate on-air incidents which occurred on April 4, April 29, May 2, and May 3, 2002. The April 4 incident was in response to an on-air game of "Naked Twister" with local female contestants. The April 29 Incident stemmed from and interview with pornographic film star Dave Cummings in which Cummings described the events of the "2002 Wildlife Productions Anal Contest" in graphic detail. The incident on May 2 similarly stemmed from an interview with pornographic film star Ron Jeremy, particularly their discussion of Jeremy's ability to "self-fellate", and his graphic descriptions of sexual encounters with an obese woman. The final incident specifically named in the FCC notice occurred on May 3, 2002 when Sunset Thomas, a pornographic actress, was "masturbated on-air to orgasm with a vibrator" with assistance from then show member T-Bone.
