= Jets Overhead (EP) =

EP by Jets Overhead
- Released: (Canada) December 20, 2003
- Genre: Dream pop, alternative rock
- Length: 23:33
- Label: Microgroove
- Producer: Stephen Leenheer

Jets Overhead chronology
Jets Overhead (2003)	Bridges (2006)

Jets Overhead is the self-titled debut extended play by Canadian alternative rock band Jets Overhead. The EP was released on December 20, 2003, and reached No. 42 on the College Media Journal chart.

== Track listing ==
1. "Addiction" - 4:38
2. "Mirror Mirror" - 5:42
3. "Take-Out" - 3:36
4. "George Harrison" - 5:42
5. "Sun Sun Sun" - 3:55
