= Full Throttle Saloon =

American reality television series (2009–2015)

- Genre: Reality
- Starring: Michael Ballard; Angie Carlson; Jesse James Dupree
- Narrated by: Johnny Dare
- Country of origin: United States
- Original language: English
- No. of seasons: 6
- No. of episodes: 52

Production
- Executive producers: Arnold Rifkin; Arthur Smith; Frank Sinton; Jesse James Dupree; Kent Weed
- Running time: 42 minutes
- Production companies: A. Smith & Co. Productions; Cheyenne Enterprises; Mighty Loud Entertainment

Original release
- Network: truTV, Destination America
- Release: November 10, 2009 – December 22, 2015

Full Throttle Saloon is an American reality television series that premiered on November 10, 2009, and originally aired on truTV. The series chronicles the daily operations of the Full Throttle Saloon in Sturgis, South Dakota, the world's largest biker bar. Located on 27 acres of land purchased in 1999 by Michael Ballard, the indoor/outdoor bar included several large stages, a burn-out pit, a tattoo parlor, zip lines, a wrestling ring, restaurants, dozens of stores, hundreds of cabins for rent, and parking for thousands of motorcycles. It was open from late March/early April until mid-November (weather permitting), and was busiest during the annual week-long Sturgis Motorcycle Rally. Each year, the first full week of August marks the beginning of the Sturgis Motorcycle Rally, during which time, the Saloon could average 20,000 guests each night.

The series aired its fifth season with TruTV on December 2, 2013. After five successful seasons with the network, TruTV confirmed via Twitter that they did not shoot a sixth season in 2014. Reelz Channel announced that they would begin airing episodes on October 3, 2014. Reelz confirmed they would only be broadcasting classic episodes of the show from previous seasons.

A massive fire destroyed the Full Throttle Saloon on September 8, 2015. Ballard later stated that the fire started when a pinched power cord to a keg refrigerator overheated and ignited a nearby cardboard box.

A sixth season aired on Destination America starting December 1, 2015 ending December 22, 2015.

The saloon burned down in September 2015. Ballard announced the saloon would be rebuilt and ground was broken in 2016, five miles away from the original location.

== Cast ==
- Michael Ballard, owner
- Angie Ballard, marketing director
- Jesse James Dupree, business partner
- Michael "Fajita Mike" Garner, chef
- Gregg "The Goat" Cook, master of ceremonies
- Eric "Senior" Soluri, security director
- Johnny Dare, narrator

== Episodes ==
Season	Episodes	Originally aired	
Season	Episodes	First aired	Last aired
1	7	November 10, 2009	December 22, 2009
2	9	November 17, 2010	January 12, 2011
3	10	November 30, 2011	February 1, 2012
4	12	December 19, 2012	March 6, 2013
5	10	December 2, 2013	February 3, 2014
6	4	December 1, 2015	December 22, 2015

=== Season 1 (2009) ===
No. overall	No. in season	Title	Original release date	U.S. viewers (millions)
1	1	"Episode 1"	November 10, 2009	N/A
2	2	"Episode 2"	November 17, 2009	N/A
3	3	"Episode 3"	November 24, 2009	N/A
4	4	"Episode 4"	December 1, 2009	N/A
5	5	"Episode 5"	December 8, 2009	N/A
6	6	"Episode 6"	December 15, 2009	N/A

=== Season 2 (2010–11) ===
No. overall	No. in season	Title	Original release date	U.S. viewers (millions)
8	1	"Most Important Week of My Life"	November 17, 2010	1.41
9	2	"Opening Day"	November 24, 2010	1.43
10	3	"We Won That Round"	December 1, 2010	1.45
11	4	"Episode 4"	December 8, 2010	1.23
12	5	"Episode 5"	December 15, 2010	1.33
13	6	"Calm Before the Storm"	December 22, 2010	1.43
14	7	"Craziest Show I've Ever Seen"	December 29, 2010	N/A
15	8	"The Hangover"	January 5, 2011	N/A
16	9	"Didn't Think it Would End Like This"	January 12, 2011	1.77

=== Season 3 (2011–12) ===
No. overall	No. in season	Title	Original release date	U.S. viewers (millions)
17	1	"A Whole 'Nother Level"	November 30, 2011	1.60
18	2	"Opening Day Disaster"	December 7, 2011	1.48
19	3	"A Big Gamble"	December 14, 2011	1.62
20	4	"Counterfeit Chaos"	December 21, 2011	1.91
21	5	"Call 911"	December 28, 2011	2.26
22	6	"Throttle-Fest"	January 4, 2012	1.81
23	7	"There Is No Plan B"	January 11, 2012	1.97
24	8	"The Bridge"	January 18, 2012	1.81
25	9	"For the Last Time"	January 25, 2012	1.64
26	10	"The Test"	February 1, 2012	2.02

=== Season 4 (2012–13) ===
No. overall	No. in season	Title	Original release date	U.S. viewers (millions)
27	1	"Bigger's Better (Or Is It?)"	December 19, 2012	1.52
28	2	"Opening Night Scramble"	December 26, 2012	1.53
29	3	"Riders on the Storm"	January 2, 2013	1.55
30	4	"Where's the Beef?"	January 9, 2013	1.39
31	5	"Tritt Happens"	January 16, 2013	1.37
32	6	"Between a Bach and a Hard Place"	January 23, 2013	1.45
33	7	"All Tucker'd Out"	January 30, 2013	1.34
34	8	"Jackyl in the Box"	February 6, 2013	1.54
35	9	"Plan B"	February 13, 2013	1.49
36	10	"Come Hell or High Water"	February 20, 2013	1.30
37	11	"The Million Dollar Question"	February 27, 2013	1.46
38	12	"The Wedding of Michael & Angie"	March 6, 2013	1.87

=== Season 5 (2013–14) ===
No. overall	No. in season	Title	Original release date	U.S. viewers (millions)
39	1	"Serving Two Masters"	December 2, 2013	0.82
40	2	"A Throttle Without Its Captain"	December 9, 2013	0.63
41	3	"Baby On Board"	December 16, 2013	1.08
42	4	"Hot Throttle, Turn Up the Heat, Too Hot to Handle"	December 23, 2013	1.16
43	5	"Taking out the Trash"	December 30, 2013	1.19
44	6	"Big and Rich"	January 6, 2014	1.03
45	7	"Crunch Time"	January 13, 2014	1.19
46	8	"Jackyl Night"	January 20, 2014	1.17
47	9	"All Hail's Gonna Break Loose"	January 27, 2014	1.35
48	10	"That's a Rap"	February 3, 2014	1.17

=== Season 6 (2015) ===
No. overall	No. in season	Title	Original release date	U.S. viewers (millions)
49	1	"And Baby Makes Three"	December 1, 2015	N/A
Both Michael and Angie Ballard struggle with running the Full Throttle Saloon and parenting their 4-month old daughter. Michael also has to deal with business being slow (in the year before the huge 75th anniversary of Rally) and increasingly aggressive competition from another bar across the street. A controversial stunt practice run puts a wedge between Michael and Jesse.
50	2	"Crime and Punishment"	December 8, 2015	N/A
Michael and Jesse mend their relationship and come up with a unique way to introduce Baby Emilly to the patrons of the Full Throttle Saloon but, in doing so, they incur the wrath of Momma Angie. Jesse's Jackyl Night concert helps save a slow season and plans begin in earnest for the 75th anniversary.
51	3	"Rally Around the Family - The 75th Anniversary"	December 15, 2015	N/A
It's the 75th anniversary of the Sturgis motorcycle rally, Full Throttle Saloon witnesses record crowds and problems. Michael contemplates selling Full Throttle and gets a call that changes everything.
52	4	"Full Throttle Fire: Rise from the Ashes"	December 22, 2015	N/A
After the fire that burned the Full Throttle Saloon to the ground on September 8, 2015, Michael, Angie, and Jesse gather for a "round table discussion" about what the Full Throttle has meant to them and their extended family over the years. They discuss the fire that changed their lives and Michael announces whether or not he plans to rebuild the Full Throttle Saloon (which he ultimately does, but at a new site).
