= Jesse James Dupree =

American rock musician (born 1962)

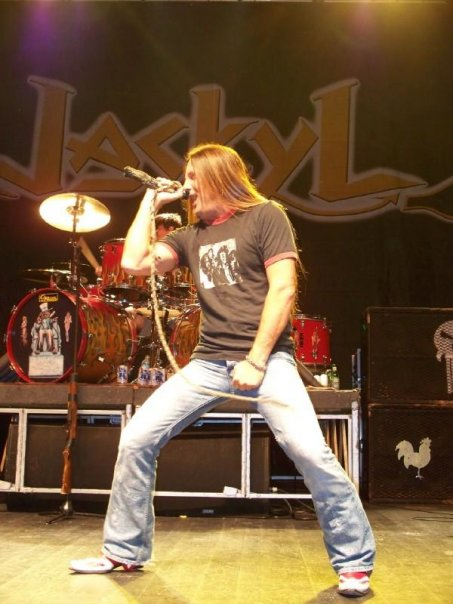
- Dupree performing with Jackyl

Background information
- Also known as: Jesse Dupree
- Born: September 22, 1962 (age 64)
- Origin: Kennesaw, Georgia, U.S.
- Genres: Hard rock, Southern rock, glam metal
- Occupations: Singer, musician, songwriter
- Instruments: Vocals, guitar, chainsaw
- Years active: 1987–present
- Labels: Geffen, Mighty Loud
- Member of: Jackyl
- Website: jessedupree.com

Jesse James Dupree (born Jesse Dupree; September 22, 1962) is an American musician. He is the lead singer, rhythm guitarist, chainsaw player, and primary songwriter in the rock band Jackyl, founded in 1991. As a solo performer, he released albums in 2000 and 2008 under the names of Jesse James Dupree and Jesse James Dupree & Dixie Inc., respectively.

== Career ==
=== Jackyl ===
Jesse James Dupree is the lead singer and guitarist of the American southern rock band Jackyl from Kennesaw, Georgia. Formed in 1991, the band signed a recording contract with Geffen Records. In 1992, a self-titled debut album was released and went platinum; the band still tours on the festival circuit, in music venues, and on TruTV's reality television series Full Throttle Saloon.

Dupree's most famous routine involves using a chainsaw as a musical instrument during the song "The Lumberjack" and "The Star Spangled Banner". His collection of customized instruments include an electric guitar with a chainsaw attached and a large customized chainsaw powered by a Dodge Hemi engine.

=== Jesse James Dupree ===
The 2000 release of Dupree's debut solo project Foot Fetish issued on V2 Records with guitarist John Hayes and bassist Roman Glick (formerly of Brother Cane) brought with it the hard rock/Southern Rock combination expected from Dupree. The single "Mainline", hit #34 on the U.S. Billboard Mainstream Rock Tracks chart.

=== Jesse James Dupree & Dixie Inc. ===
2008 brought the release of Rev It Up and Go-Go, an album by Jesse James Dupree & Dixie Inc. Three music videos were released in promotion of the new CD: "Money Lovin' & Speed", "The Party" and "Bite".

In September 2001, Dupree performed and recorded a cover of AC/DC's "Highway to Hell" for the ECW Music CD Anarchy Rocks Extreme Music Volume 2 released on V2 Records.

=== Television ===
Full Throttle Saloon

After performing with Jackyl at Full Throttle Saloon in Sturgis, South Dakota, Dupree formed a partnership with Full Throttle Saloon owner, Michael Ballard, and the duo created a reality show, covering the operations of the largest biker bar in the United States.

Dupree and Ballard appear on the show (as themselves), along with several other characters each season. Dupree was the entertainment director and executive producer of the series. He is not and never was part owner. He also performs live with his band Jackyl, and performed his own stunts on the show. Full Throttle Saloon aired its first season on TruTV in 2009, though not officially confirmed, a reboot of the show is a possibility.

The saloon was destroyed by fire on September 8, 2015.

The new Full Throttle opened for the first time Rally 1016

=== Business interests ===
Dupree started Mighty Loud Entertainment, a record label and artist management company. Through Mighty Loud, Dupree is the General Manager of Kiefer Sutherland's label Ironworks and also runs an imprint label as part of the Universal Music system. Mighty Loud Entertainment manages artists such as Nigel Dupree Band, Jackyl, Wayland, and Babi Mac.

In 2010, Dupree created and launched "Jesse James Spirits", a line of alcoholic beverages that includes the "Jesse James America's Outlaw" brands of beer and bourbon whiskey. Flavored bourbons (honey flavored and spiced) were introduced to the product line soon afterward.

== Personal life ==
In 1989, Jesse had a son named Nigel Thomas Dupree who was the lead vocalist for the Nigel Dupree Band, and was the drummer for Wayland and is now the drummer for Tuk Smith and the Restless Hearts. He also has a daughter named Thea. Jesse is married to Penny Dupree.

== Discography ==
=== Albums ===
- Foot Fetish (2000)
- Breathing Fire (2023)

=== Singles ===
Title	Year	Peak chart positions	Album
Title	Year	US Main.	Album
"Mainline"	2000	34	Foot Fetish
"Never Gets Old"	2023	—	Breathing Fire
"Stranded"	2024	30	Breathing Fire
