= Sunset (disambiguation) =

Sunset is the time when the Sun disappears below the horizon in the west.

Sunset, Sunsets, The Sunset or Sun Set may also refer to:

== Arts and entertainment ==
=== Film and television ===
- Sunset (1988 film), a 1988 western directed by Blake Edwards
- Sunset (1990 film), a 1990 Russian film about fictional gangster Benya Krik based in Isaac Babel's stories
- Sunset (2018 film), a 2018 Hungarian film directed by László Nemes
- "Sunset" (Breaking Bad), a season three episode of Breaking Bad
- "Sunset" (True Blood), an episode of the HBO TV series True Blood
- Sunset Productions, a former television subsidiary of Warner Bros. absorbed by Warner Bros. Cartoons
- Sunset Shimmer, a character in the My Little Pony: Equestria Girls franchise

=== Gaming ===
- Sunset (video game), a 2015 art game by Belgium developer Tale of Tales

=== Literature ===
- Sunset (magazine), an American lifestyle magazine
- Sunset (novel), a 2006 Warriors: The New Prophecy novel by Erin Hunter
- Sunset (play), a 1927 play novel by Isaac Babel
- "Sunsets" (poem), ("Soleils couchants"), a set of six poems, or a six-part poem, by Victor Hugo

=== Music ===
==== Groups and labels ====
- Shakin' Stevens and the Sunsets, a Welsh rock band
- Sunset Records, an American record label

==== Albums ====
- Sunset (EP), by Pete Yorn, 2000
- Sun Set, a box set by Klaatu, 2005
- Sunset (Michel Teló album), 2013
- Sunset (Superbus album), 2013
- Sunset, half of the Coldplay album Everyday Life, 2019
- Sunsets, by Chris Watson, 1994
- Sunsets (DVD), by Powderfinger, 2004

==== Songs ====
- "Sunset" (bugle call), a military bugle call in the UK and British Commonwealth
- "Sunset (Bird of Prey)", by Fatboy Slim, 2000
- "Sunset", by AB6IX from 6ixense, 2019
- "Sunset", by Air Supply from Air Supply, 1985
- "Sunset", by Boyd Rice (NON) from Easy Listening for Iron Youth, 1991
- "Sunset", by Caroline Polachek from Desire, I Want to Turn Into You, 2023
- "Sunset", by Demi Lovato from Dancing with the Devil... the Art of Starting Over, 2021
- "Sunset", by Farruko Visionary, 2015
- "Sunset", by Jackie Lomax from Is This What You Want?, 1969
- "Sunset", by J. Cole from Revenge of the Dreamers III, 2019
- "Sunset", by Kate Bush from Aerial, 2005
- "Sunset", by Kim Dong-han from D-Day, 2018
- "Sunset", by Marques Houston from Mr. Houston, 2009
- "Sunset", by Mike Oldfield from Light + Shade, 2005
- "Sunset", by Roxy Music from Stranded, 1973
- "Sunset", by Stevie Wonder from Tribute to Uncle Ray, 1962
- "Sunsets" (song), by Powderfinger from Vulture Street, 2004
- "A Sunset", by Pulp from More, 2025

=== Visual arts ===
- Sunset (Delacroix), a mid 19th century drawing by Eugene Delacroix
- Sunset (Friedrich), an 1830–1835 oil on canvas by Caspar David Friedrich
- Sunset (Rylov painting), a 1917 oil on canvas by Arkady Rylov

== Places ==
=== Australia ===
- Sunset, Queensland, a suburb of Mount Isa
- Sunset, Victoria

=== Canada ===
- Sunset, Vancouver, a neighbourhood

=== United Kingdom ===
- Sunset, Herefordshire

=== United States ===
- Sunset, Arizona
- Sunset, Washington County, Arkansas
- Sunset, Arkansas
- Sunset, California
- Sunset, Florida
- Sunset, Louisiana
- Sunset, Missouri
- Sunset, Maine
- Sunset, South Carolina
- Sunset, Montague County, Texas
- Sunset, Starr County, Texas
- Sunset, Utah
- Sunset, Texas (disambiguation)
- Sunset, West Virginia
- Sunset, Wisconsin
- Bankhead House (Jasper, Alabama), also known as Sunset
- Sunset 4A Region, Nevada
- Sunset Crater, Arizona, U.S.
- Sunset District, San Francisco, California, U.S.
- Sunset Drive, the major roadway through downtown South Miami, Florida, U.S.

== Transportation ==
- Sunset station (New York), in Brighton, New York, U.S.
- 17th Street/SMC station, in Los Angeles, U.S.; formerly named "Sunset"

== Other uses ==
- Sunset (apple), an apple cultivar
- Sunset (mango), a mango cultivar
- Sunset (color), a pale tint of orange
- Sunset (computing), the planned discontinuation of a server, service, software feature, etc.
- Sunset provision, a clause in a statute that terminates the law after a certain date unless further legislative action is taken

== See also ==
- Sunset town, all-white municipalities that prohibit black people from being in the town after sunset
