= Joe Satriani: The Complete Studio Recordings =

The Complete Studio Recordings

Box set by Joe Satriani
- Released: April 22, 2014
- Recorded: 1986–2013 at various locations
- Genres: Instrumental rock, hard rock
- Label: Legacy
- Producers: Joe Satriani, John Cuniberti

Joe Satriani chronology
Unstoppable Momentum (2013)	The Complete Studio Recordings (2014)	Shockwave Supernova (2015)

Professional ratings
Review scores
Source	Rating
Record Collector	4/5 stars

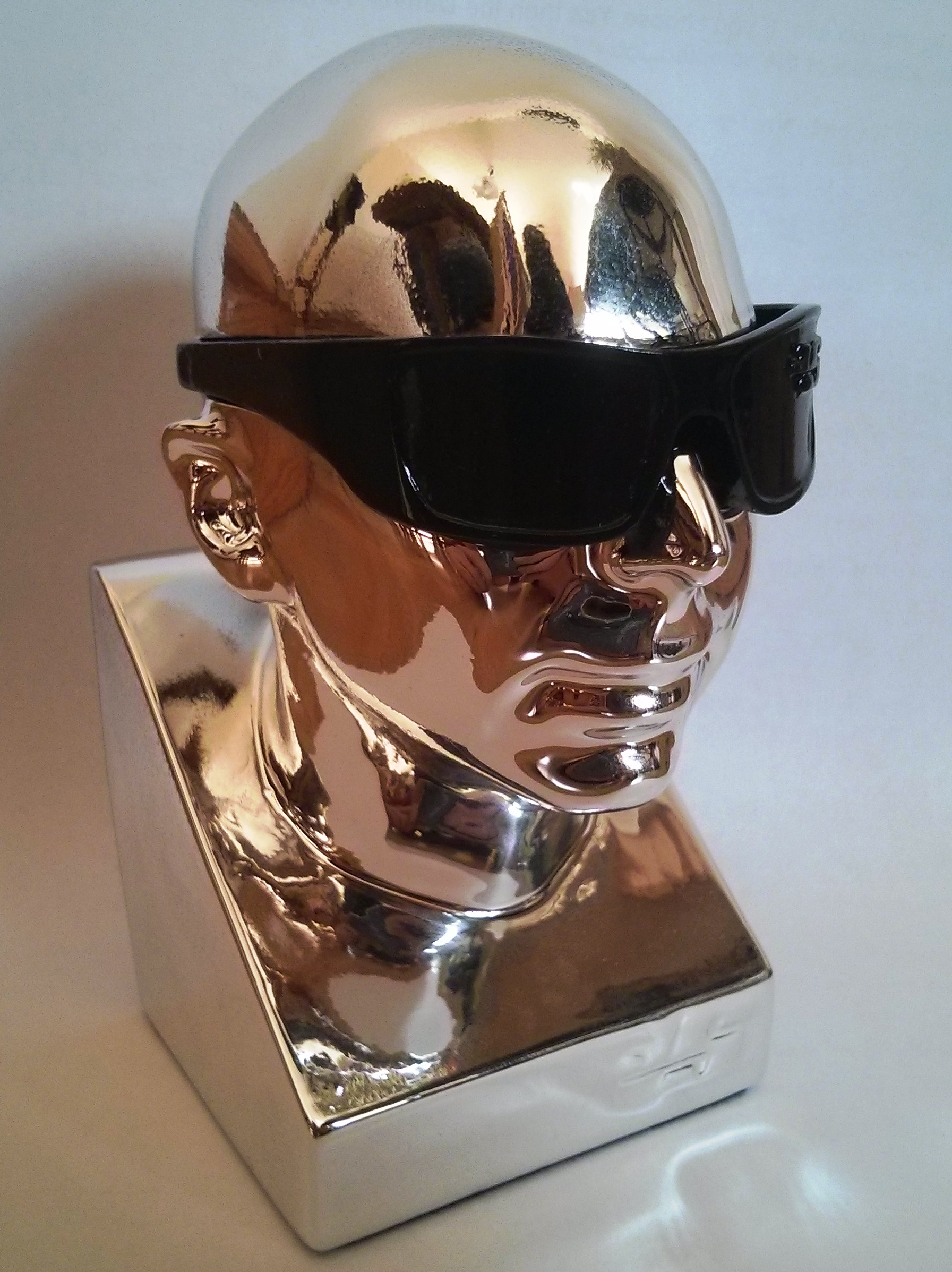
The "Chrome Dome" USB

The Complete Studio Recordings is a box set compilation by guitarist Joe Satriani released on April 22, 2014, through Legacy Recordings. It contains all fourteen of Satriani's studio albums recorded between 1986 and 2013, and also includes a bonus album named Added Creations and Bonus Tracks which contains alternate takes, remixes and one-off tracks. All fifteen albums also appear digitally remastered on two USB sticks stored in a lifelike sculpture of Satriani's head, dubbed the "Chrome Dome", in a limited run of 500, which was exclusively available through Satriani's website.

== Track listing ==
All songs written by Joe Satriani except where noted.

Not of This Earth
No.	Title	Length
1.	"Not of This Earth"	4:04
2.	"The Snake"	4:43
3.	"Rubina"	5:56
4.	"Memories"	4:06
5.	"Brother John"	2:10
6.	"The Enigmatic"	3:26
7.	"Driving at Night"	3:33
8.	"Hordes of Locusts"	4:59
9.	"New Day"	3:52
10.	"The Headless Horseman"	1:53
Total length:		38:42

Surfing with the Alien
No.	Title	Length
1.	"Surfing with the Alien"	4:25
2.	"Ice 9"	4:00
3.	"Crushing Day"	5:14
4.	"Always with Me, Always with You"	3:22
5.	"Satch Boogie"	3:13
6.	"Hill of the Skull"	1:48
7.	"Circles"	3:28
8.	"Lords of Karma"	4:48
9.	"Midnight"	1:42
10.	"Echo"	5:37
Total length:		37:37

Flying in a Blue Dream
No.	Title	Length
1.	"Flying in a Blue Dream"	5:23
2.	"The Mystical Potato Head Groove Thing"	5:09
3.	"Can't Slow Down"	4:49
4.	"Headless"	1:30
5.	"Strange"	5:02
6.	"I Believe"	5:54
7.	"One Big Rush"	3:25
8.	"Big Bad Moon"	5:15
9.	"The Feeling"	0:50
10.	"The Phone Call"	3:01
11.	"Day at the Beach (New Rays from an Ancient Sun)"	2:03
12.	"Back to Shalla-Bal"	3:14
13.	"Ride"	4:56
14.	"The Forgotten (Part One)"	1:12
15.	"The Forgotten (Part Two)"	5:08
16.	"The Bells of Lal (Part One)"	1:19
17.	"The Bells of Lal (Part Two)"	4:07
18.	"Into the Light"	2:30
Total length:		64:47

The Extremist
No.	Title	Length
1.	"Friends"	3:29
2.	"The Extremist"	3:43
3.	"War"	5:48
4.	"Cryin'"	5:43
5.	"Rubina's Blue Sky Happiness"	6:11
6.	"Summer Song"	5:00
7.	"Tears in the Rain"	1:18
8.	"Why"	4:45
9.	"Motorcycle Driver"	4:58
10.	"New Blues"	6:58
Total length:		47:53

Time Machine – The Studio Recordings
No.	Title	Length
1.	"Time Machine"	5:07
2.	"The Mighty Turtle Head"	5:12
3.	"All Alone" (Billie Holiday, Mal Waldron; arrangement: Satriani)	4:22
4.	"Banana Mango II"	6:05
5.	"Thinking of You"	3:57
6.	"Crazy"	4:06
7.	"Speed of Light"	5:14
8.	"Baroque"	2:15
9.	"Dweller on the Threshold"	4:15
10.	"Banana Mango"	2:44
11.	"Dreaming #11"	3:37
12.	"I Am Become Death"	3:56
13.	"Saying Goodbye"	2:54
14.	"Woodstock Jam"	16:07
Total length:		69:51

Joe Satriani
No.	Title	Length
1.	"Cool #9"	6:00
2.	"If"	4:49
3.	"Down, Down, Down"	6:13
4.	"Luminous Flesh Giants"	5:55
5.	"S.M.F."	6:43
6.	"Look My Way"	4:01
7.	"Home"	3:27
8.	"Moroccan Sunset"	4:23
9.	"Killer Bee Bop"	3:48
10.	"Slow Down Blues"	7:25
11.	"(You're) My World"	3:56
12.	"Sittin' 'Round"	3:38
Total length:		60:18

Crystal Planet
No.	Title	Length
1.	"Up in the Sky"	4:09
2.	"House Full of Bullets"	5:33
3.	"Crystal Planet"	4:34
4.	"Love Thing"	3:50
5.	"Trundrumbalind"	5:13
6.	"Lights of Heaven"	4:23
7.	"Raspberry Jam Delta-v"	5:21
8.	"Ceremony"	4:53
9.	"With Jupiter in Mind"	5:46
10.	"Secret Prayer"	4:27
11.	"A Train of Angels"	3:42
12.	"A Piece of Liquid"	3:04
13.	"Psycho Monkey"	4:36
14.	"Time"	5:05
15.	"Z.Z.'s Song"	3:01
Total length:		67:37

Engines of Creation
No.	Title	Length
1.	"Devil's Slide"	5:10
2.	"Flavor Crystal 7"	4:26
3.	"Borg Sex"	5:27
4.	"Until We Say Goodbye"	4:31
5.	"Attack"	4:22
6.	"Champagne?"	6:04
7.	"Clouds Race Across the Sky"	6:14
8.	"The Power Cosmic 2000-Part I"	2:09
9.	"The Power Cosmic 2000-Part II"	4:23
10.	"Slow and Easy"	4:44
11.	"Engines of Creation"	5:57
Total length:		53:27

Strange Beautiful Music
No.	Title	Length
1.	"Oriental Melody"	3:56
2.	"Belly Dancer"	5:02
3.	"Starry Night"	3:55
4.	"Chords of Life"	4:13
5.	"Mind Storm"	4:12
6.	"Sleep Walk" (Santo Farina, Johnny Farina)	2:46
7.	"New Last Jam"	4:19
8.	"Mountain Song"	3:31
9.	"What Breaks a Heart"	5:20
10.	"Seven String"	4:02
11.	"Hill Groove"	4:10
12.	"The Journey"	4:09
13.	"The Traveler"	5:39
14.	"You Saved My Life"	5:02
Total length:		60:22

Is There Love In Space?
No.	Title	Length
1.	"Gnaahh"	3:33
2.	"Up in Flames"	4:33
3.	"Hands in the Air"	4:27
4.	"Lifestyle"	4:34
5.	"Is There Love in Space?"	4:50
6.	"If I Could Fly"	6:31
7.	"The Souls of Distortion"	4:58
8.	"Just Look Up"	4:50
9.	"I Like the Rain"	4:00
10.	"Searching"	10:07
11.	"Bamboo"	5:45
Total length:		58:08

Super Colossal
No.	Title	Length
1.	"Super Colossal"	4:14
2.	"Just Like Lightnin'"	4:01
3.	"It's So Good"	4:14
4.	"Redshift Riders"	4:50
5.	"Ten Words"	3:28
6.	"A Cool New Way"	6:13
7.	"One Robot's Dream"	6:16
8.	"The Meaning of Love"	4:34
9.	"Made of Tears"	5:32
10.	"Theme for a Strange World"	4:39
11.	"Movin' On"	4:05
12.	"A Love Eternal"	3:33
13.	"Crowd Chant"	3:14
Total length:		58:53

Professor Satchafunkilus and the Musterion of Rock
No.	Title	Length
1.	"Musterion"	4:37
2.	"Overdriver"	5:06
3.	"I Just Wanna Rock"	3:27
4.	"Professor Satchafunkilus"	4:47
5.	"Revelation"	5:57
6.	"Come on Baby"	5:49
7.	"Out of the Sunrise"	5:43
8.	"Diddle-Y-A-Doo-Dat"	4:16
9.	"Asik Vaysel"	7:42
10.	"Andalusia"	6:51
Total length:		54:15

Black Swans and Wormhole Wizards
No.	Title	Length
1.	"Premonition"	3:52
2.	"Dream Song"	4:48
3.	"Pyrrhic Victoria"	5:08
4.	"Light Years Away"	6:11
5.	"Solitude"	0:57
6.	"Littleworth Lane"	3:46
7.	"The Golden Room"	5:19
8.	"Two Sides to Every Story"	4:10
9.	"Wormhole Wizards"	6:27
10.	"Wind in the Trees"	7:42
11.	"God Is Crying"	4:52
Total length:		53:12

Unstoppable Momentum
No.	Title	Length
1.	"Unstoppable Momentum"	5:14
2.	"Can't Go Back"	3:58
3.	"Lies and Truths"	4:44
4.	"Three Sheets to the Wind"	3:22
5.	"I'll Put a Stone on Your Cairn"	1:42
6.	"A Door into Summer"	4:16
7.	"Shine On American Dreamer"	4:46
8.	"Jumpin' In"	5:11
9.	"Jumpin' Out"	3:51
10.	"The Weight of the World"	5:07
11.	"A Celebration"	2:47
Total length:		44:58

Additional Creations and Bonus Tracks
No.	Title	Length
1.	"The Crush Of Love" (From Dreaming #11 EP)	4:17
2.	"Time Machine (Remix)"	5:08
3.	"Cool #9 (Alternate)"	5:34
4.	"Luminous Flesh Giants (Alternate)"	6:02
5.	"Borg Sex (Rock Mix)" (From Additional Creations EP)	5:12
6.	"Turkey Man" (From Additional Creations EP)	6:46
7.	"Flavour Crystal 7 (Rock Mix)" (From Additional Creations EP)	4:26
8.	"Until We Say Goodbye (Techno Mix)" (From Additional Creations EP)	5:29
9.	"Slick" (From The Electric Joe Satriani: An Anthology)	3:41
10.	"The Eight Steps" (From The Electric Joe Satriani: An Anthology)	5:45
11.	"Dog With Crown & Earring" (From Is There Love In Space? Japanese edition)	4:29
12.	"Tumble" (Digital single)	3:44
13.	"Ghosts" (Digital bonus track from Professor Satchafunkilus and the Musterion of Rock)	4:28
14.	"Heartbeats" (Digital bonus track from Black Swans and Wormhole Wizards)	3:25
15.	"Longing" (Digital bonus track from Black Swans and Wormhole Wizards)	3:55
16.	"ZZ's Song (Alternate)"	3:05
Total length:		75:26
