= Flying in a Blue Dream =

Studio album by Joe Satriani
- Released: October 30, 1989
- Studios: Fantasy (Berkeley); Hyde Street (San Francisco); Different Fur (San Francisco); Coast (San Francisco); Alpha & Omega (San Francisco)
- Genres: Instrumental rock; hard rock
- Length: 64:47
- Label: Relativity
- Producers: Joe Satriani, John Cuniberti

Joe Satriani chronology
| Dreaming #11 (1988) | Flying in a Blue Dream (1989) | The Extremist (1992) |

Singles from Flying in a Blue Dream
- 1. "I Believe" Released: 1989; 2. "Big Bad Moon" / "Day at the Beach (New Rays from an Ancient Sun)" Released: 1989; 3. "Flying in a Blue Dream" / "The Phone Call" Released: 1989

Flying in a Blue Dream is the third studio album by guitarist Joe Satriani, released on October 30, 1989 through Relativity Records. It is one of Satriani's most popular albums and his second highest-charting release to date, reaching No. 23 on the U.S. Billboard 200 and remaining on that chart for 39 weeks, as well as reaching the top 40 in three other countries.

Four singles reached Billboard's Mainstream Rock chart: "One Big Rush" and "Big Bad Moon" both at No. 17, "Back To Shalla-Bal" at No. 31, and "I Believe" at No. 36. Flying in a Blue Dream was certified Gold on January 25, 1990 and received a nomination for Best Rock Instrumental Performance at the 1991 Grammy Awards, Satriani's third such nomination.

== Overview ==
In a 2014 interview with MusicRadar, Satriani described the writing and recording process for Flying in a Blue Dream as "A very stressful time" and that "It was just so difficult and insane, but there was also this enormous amount of creativity. I was so excited that I had fans! [Laughs]." Comprising a varied and eclectic range of styles, the album contains more tracks (18) than any of his other albums; Time Machine (1993) has 28 tracks as a double album.

The title track has endured as one of Satriani's best-known songs and is a mainstay at his concerts, as well as "The Mystical Potato Head Groove Thing". The album is Satriani's first to feature vocals, on the songs "Can't Slow Down", "Strange", "I Believe", "Big Bad Moon", "The Phone Call" and "Ride". It also marks the first time Satriani plays the Deering six-string banjo-style guitar ("The Feeling" is performed entirely using that instrument) and harmonica, the latter of which features prominently on "Headless", "Big Bad Moon" and "Ride".

"Headless" is a remake of "The Headless Horseman" from Not of This Earth (1986), but with added distorted vocals and harmonica along with a 'squawky' guitar tone making chicken-like sounds. "Day at the Beach (New Rays from an Ancient Sun)" and "The Forgotten (Part One)" are performed using a two-handed tapping technique.

"The Bells of Lal (Part One)" was featured in the 1996 film Sling Blade, during the scene where Karl Childers (Billy Bob Thornton) is sharpening a lawnmower blade to kill the menacing Doyle Hargraves (Dwight Yoakam).

Music videos for the ballad "I Believe" and hard rocker "Big Bad Moon" were included on The Satch Tapes, which was first released on VHS cassette in 1993 and reissued on DVD on November 18, 2003; it also includes excerpts from an MTV performance of "The Feeling". "One Big Rush" was featured in the 1989 film Say Anything...

"Back to Shalla-Bal" refers to Shalla-Bal from the Marvel Comics universe; it is the second reference Satriani has made to the Silver Surfer character, who was first featured on the cover art of Surfing with the Alien (1987). The track was later used as the menu music to the 1996 Sony PlayStation video game Formula 1, which also featured "Summer Song" from The Extremist (1992).

== Reissues ==
Flying in a Blue Dream has been reissued several times. The first was on May 27, 1997 through Epic Records and again on June 16, 2008 as part of the Original Album Classics box set. The most recent reissue was part of The Complete Studio Recordings, released on April 22, 2014 through Legacy Recordings; this is a box set compilation containing remastered editions of every Satriani studio album from 1986 to 2013.

== Critical reception ==
Professional ratings
Review scores
| Source | Rating |
|---|---|
| AllMusic | 4.5/5 stars |

Phil Carter at AllMusic gave Flying in a Blue Dream 4.5 stars out of five, calling it "An hour-long disc filled with musical explorations and compositions that defy belief" and "unquestionably Joe Satriani at his absolute best." Satriani's first attempts at singing were highlighted and described as "[not] extraordinary, but it fits extremely well with the music he creates". Carter concluded by saying that the album is "Soaring, powerful, and triumphant" and "deserves a place in everyone's collection."

== Track listing ==
All tracks are written by Joe Satriani.

| No. | Title | Length |
|---|---|---|
| 1. | "Flying in a Blue Dream" | 5:23 |
| 2. | "The Mystical Potato Head Groove Thing" | 5:09 |
| 3. | "Can't Slow Down" | 4:49 |
| 4. | "Headless" | 1:30 |
| 5. | "Strange" | 5:02 |
| 6. | "I Believe" | 5:54 |
| 7. | "One Big Rush" | 3:25 |
| 8. | "Big Bad Moon" | 5:15 |
| 9. | "The Feeling" | 0:50 |
| 10. | "The Phone Call" | 3:01 |
| 11. | "Day at the Beach (New Rays from an Ancient Sun)" | 2:03 |
| 12. | "Back to Shalla-Bal" | 3:14 |
| 13. | "Ride" | 4:56 |
| 14. | "The Forgotten (Part One)" | 1:12 |
| 15. | "The Forgotten (Part Two)" | 5:08 |
| 16. | "The Bells of Lal (Part One)" | 1:19 |
| 17. | "The Bells of Lal (Part Two)" | 4:07 |
| 18. | "Into the Light" | 2:30 |
| Total length: | | 64:47 |

== Personnel ==
- Joe Satriani – vocals, guitar, banjo, keyboard, percussion, programming, pre-production programming, bass, harmonica, arrangement, producer
- John Cuniberti – sitar, percussion, engineering, production
- Jeff Campitelli – drums, percussion, pre-production programming
- Bongo Bob Smith – drums (tracks 5, 12, 13), percussion (tracks 5, 12, 13), pre-production programming
- Simon Phillips – drums (track 6)
- Stuart Hamm – bass (tracks 5, 17)
- Pete Scatturro – programming, sound design
- Stephen Hart – engineering assistance
- Chad Munsey – engineering assistance
- David Plank – engineering assistance
- Michael Rosen – engineering assistance
- Michael Semanick – engineering assistance
- Matt Wallace – engineering assistance
- Tom Size – engineering assistance
- David Luke – engineering assistance
- Bernie Grundman – mastering

== Charts ==
| Chart (1989–90) | Peak position |
|---|---|
| Australian Albums (ARIA) | 21 |
| Canada Top Albums/CDs (RPM) | 25 |
| Dutch Albums (Album Top 100) | 76 |
| Finnish Albums (The Official Finnish Charts) | 27 |
| New Zealand Albums (RMNZ) | 7 |
| Swedish Albums (Sverigetopplistan) | 34 |
| US Billboard 200 | 23 |

== Certifications ==
| Region | Certification | Certified units/sales |
|---|---|---|
| Australia (ARIA) | Gold | 35,000^{^} |
| United Kingdom (BPI) | Silver | 60,000^{^} |
| United States (RIAA) | Gold | 500,000^{^} |
^{^} Shipments figures based on certification alone.

== Awards ==
| Event | Title | Award | Result |
|---|---|---|---|
| 1991 Grammys | Flying in a Blue Dream | Best Rock Instrumental Performance | Nominated |
