= Banana Mango =

Banana Mango may refer to:

- Mahachanok (mango), referred to as Banana Mango in Bangladesh and the Bangladeshi diaspora.
- Joe Satriani (EP), which contains a track named Banana Mango.
