= Saying Goodbye =

Saying Goodbye may refer to:

- Saying Goodbye (TV series), a 1990 Canadian drama anthology series
- Saying Goodbye, a 2009 short film by Casper Andreas
- "Saying Goodbye", a song by Deborah Cox from The Promise, 2008
- "Saying Good-Bye", a song by Joe Satriani from Joe Satriani, 1984
