= Mahachanok =

Mahachanok may refer to:

- Mahachanok, the Thai name for Mahajanaka, one of the ten Mahanipata Jataka, stories about past lives of the Buddha
- Mahachanok (mango), a mango cultivar originating in Thailand
