= Cryin' (Joe Satriani song) =

1992 song performed by Joe Satriani

Single by Joe Satriani

from the album The Extremist
- Released: 1992
- Recorded: 1990–92
- Genre: Hard rock, soft rock, instrumental rock
- Length: 14:32
- Label: Relativity
- Songwriter: Joe Satriani
- Producers: Joe Satriani, Andy Johns, John Cuniberti

Joe Satriani singles chronology
"Summer Song" (1992)	"Cryin'" (1992)	"The Extremist" (1993)

"Cryin'" is a single by guitarist Joe Satriani, released in 1992 through Relativity Records. The single contains two instrumental tracks from his Grammy-nominated fourth studio album The Extremist, with "Cryin'" reaching No. 24 on the U.S. Billboard Mainstream Rock chart.

== Track listing ==
All music is composed by Joe Satriani.

No.	Title	Length
1.	"Cryin'"	6:10
2.	"Banana Mango"	3:37
3.	"Why"	4:45
Total length:		14:32
