= The Extremist =

Studio album by Joe Satriani
- Released: July 21, 1992
- Recorded: 1990–92
- Studios: Bearsville (Woodstock, New York); Coast Recorders (San Francisco); Alpha & Omega (San Francisco); Ocean Way (Hollywood); Record One (Los Angeles); Fantasy (Berkeley, California)
- Genre: Instrumental rock
- Length: 47:53
- Label: Relativity
- Producers: Joe Satriani, Andy Johns, John Cuniberti

Joe Satriani chronology
Flying in a Blue Dream (1989)	The Extremist (1992)	Time Machine (1993)

Singles from The Extremist
- 1. "Friends" Released: 1992; 2. "Summer Song" Released: 1992; 3. "Cryin'" Released: 1992; 4. "The Extremist" Released: 1992

The Extremist is the fourth studio album by guitarist Joe Satriani, released on July 21, 1992, through Relativity Records. The album is one of Satriani's most popular releases and his highest-charting to date, reaching No. 22 on the U.S. Billboard 200 and remaining on that chart for 28 weeks, as well as reaching the top 50 in six other countries. Three singles reached Billboard's Mainstream Rock chart: "Summer Song" at No. 5, "Friends" at No. 12 and "Cryin'" at No. 24. The Extremist was certified Gold on December 22, 1992. and received a nomination for Best Rock Instrumental Performance at the 1993 Grammy Awards, Satriani's fourth such nomination.

== Overview ==
"Rubina's Blue Sky Happiness" is dedicated to Satriani's wife Rubina, and is the second song named after her, following "Rubina" from Not of This Earth (1986). "Summer Song" has endured as one of Satriani's best-known songs and is a mainstay at his concerts; it was used by Sony in a commercial for the Walkman and was later included on the soundtrack to two of Sony's console video games: Formula 1 (1996) for the PlayStation and Gran Turismo 4 (2004) for the PlayStation 2. Two B-sides from The Extremist's recording sessions, "Crazy" and "Banana Mango II", together with the outtakes "Thinking of You", "Speed of Light" and "Baroque", were later released on Satriani's 1993 double album Time Machine.

== Reissues ==
The Extremist has been reissued several times. The first was in 1997 through Epic Records and again on June 16, 2008, as part of the Original Album Classics box set. The most recent reissue was part of The Complete Studio Recordings, released on April 22, 2014, through Legacy Recordings; this is a box set compilation containing remastered editions of every Satriani studio album from 1986 to 2013.

== Critical reception ==
Professional ratings
Review scores
Source	Rating
AllMusic	4/5 stars

Phil Carter at AllMusic gave The Extremist four stars out of five, saying that the album lives up to its name. "Summer Song", "Friends", "Motorcycle Driver", and the title track were noted as highlights.

== Track listing ==
All music is composed by Joe Satriani.

No.	Title	Length
1.	"Friends" (arrangement: Satriani, Andy Johns)	3:29
2.	"The Extremist"	3:43
3.	"War"	5:48
4.	"Cryin'"	5:43
5.	"Rubina's Blue Sky Happiness"	6:11
6.	"Summer Song"	5:00
7.	"Tears in the Rain"	1:18
8.	"Why"	4:45
9.	"Motorcycle Driver"	4:58
10.	"New Blues"	6:58
Total length:		47:53

Japanese edition bonus track
No.	Title	Length
11.	"Crazy"	4:06

== Personnel ==
- Joe Satriani – guitar, Dobro, keyboard, synthesizer, banjo, mandolin, bass (tracks 8, 10), harmonica, arrangement, mixing, producer
- Phil Ashley – keyboard (track 6), synthesized strings, synthesized trumpet (track 10), squeezebox
- Gregg Bissonette – drums (tracks 1–6, 8, 9)
- Bongo Bob Smith – drums (track 8), percussion (track 8)
- Simon Phillips – drums (tracks 5, 10), tambourine
- Paulinho da Costa – percussion (tracks 2–4, 6, 8, 9)
- Jeff Campitelli – cymbals (track 10)
- Andy Johns – organ (tracks 2, 9), arrangement (track 1), engineering (tracks 1–9), mixing, production (tracks 1–9)
- Brett Tuggle – organ (track 4)
- Matt Bissonette – bass (tracks 1–6, 9)
- Doug Wimbish – bass (track 5), spoken vocals

Technical

- John Cuniberti – engineering (tracks 5, 6, 8, 10), production (tracks 5, 6, 8, 10)
- Bart Stevens – engineering assistance
- Dan Bosworth – engineering assistance
- Michael Semanick – engineering assistance
- David Plank – engineering assistance
- Michael Reiter – engineering assistance
- Julie Last – engineering assistance
- Bernie Grundman – mastering
- Matt Mahurin – cover photography

== Charts ==
Chart (1992–93)	Peak position
Australian Albums (ARIA)	29
Canada Top Albums/CDs (RPM)	27
Dutch Albums (Album Top 100)	44
European Albums (IFPI)	25
Finnish Albums (The Official Finnish Charts)	14
French Albums (SNEP)	13
German Albums (Offizielle Top 100)	55
New Zealand Albums (RMNZ)	16
Norwegian Albums (VG-lista)	5
Swedish Albums (Sverigetopplistan)	35
Swiss Albums (Schweizer Hitparade)	11
UK Albums (Official Charts)	13
US Billboard 200	23

== Certifications ==
Region	Certification	Certified units/sales
France (SNEP)	Gold	100,000^{*}
United States (RIAA)	Gold	500,000^{^}
^{*} Sales figures based on certification alone.^{^} Shipments figures based on certification alone.

== Awards ==
Event	Title	Award	Result
1993 Grammys	The Extremist	Best Rock Instrumental Performance	Nominated
