= Not of This Earth (Joe Satriani album) =

Studio album by Joe Satriani
- Released: December 18, 1986
- Recorded: Early 1985
- Studio: Hyde Street (San Francisco)
- Genre: Instrumental rock
- Length: 38:42
- Label: Relativity
- Producer: Joe Satriani, John Cuniberti

Joe Satriani chronology
Joe Satriani (1984)	Not of This Earth (1986)	Surfing with the Alien (1987)

Alternate cover
- European edition / 1988 reissue

Not of This Earth is the debut studio album by guitarist Joe Satriani, released on December 18, 1986, through Relativity Records.

== Overview ==
In the liner notes, Satriani provides a brief introduction to himself and the background behind Not of This Earth, which was recorded in early 1985. He states that his goal was "to make a 'guitar-record' that would be enjoyed by all; not just a 'guitar-chops-record' but one with real music on it." He also mentions the recording of a follow-up album which he promises "will turn heads, drop jaws and create world peace in our lifetime!"; this would become his 1987 breakthrough smash hit, Surfing with the Alien.

The album uses electronic drums rather than acoustic drums. The title track utilizes a unique compositional technique described by Satriani as pitch axis theory, which consists of shifting modes underneath a pedal tone (in this case, E). "The Enigmatic" uses the enigmatic scale. "Rubina" is one of two tracks named after his wife, the other being "Rubina's Blue Sky Happiness" on The Extremist (1992). "The Headless Horseman" is performed entirely using a two-handed tapping technique, and was revisited in the form of "Headless" on Flying in a Blue Dream (1989).

== Reissue ==
Not of This Earth has been reissued several times. The original cover art used for the first vinyl and CD editions was lost early on, having since been replaced with an alternate cover which has been used for all releases since 1988. Notably, the guitar with which Satriani is pictured on this second edition cover, an Ibanez 540P (originally known as the "Power"), was never actually used by him. The photo was "just a promo shot that got too much press".

The second major reissue of the album was as part of the Joe Satriani Original Album Classics box set, released on June 16, 2008 through Epic Records. The most recent reissue was part of The Complete Studio Recordings, released on April 22, 2014 through Legacy Recordings; this is a box set compilation containing newly remastered editions of every Satriani studio album from 1986 to 2013.

== Critical reception ==
Professional ratings
Review scores
Source	Rating
AllMusic	4/5 stars

Phil Carter at AllMusic gave Not of This Earth four stars out of five, describing it as having "superior compositions, a signature style, a unique tone, and playing that's out of this world." He praised Satriani's "fluid playing and wicked licks [that] are enough to drop jaws and widen eyes" and that "There isn't a weak track on this disc".

== Track listing ==
All music is composed by Joe Satriani.

No.	Title	Length
1.	"Not of This Earth"	4:04
2.	"The Snake"	4:43
3.	"Rubina"	5:56
4.	"Memories"	4:06
5.	"Brother John"	2:10
6.	"The Enigmatic"	3:26
7.	"Driving at Night"	3:33
8.	"Hordes of Locusts"	4:59
9.	"New Day"	3:52
10.	"The Headless Horseman"	1:53
Total length:		38:42

== Personnel ==
- Joe Satriani – guitar, keyboard, percussion, bass, producer
- John Cuniberti – vocals, percussion, engineering, mixing, production
- Jeff Campitelli – drums, percussion, DX, whistle
- Bernie Grundman – mastering
