= Time Machine (Joe Satriani album) =

Studio album by Joe Satriani
- Released: October 13, 1993
- Recorded: 1984–1993 at various locations
- Genres: Instrumental rock; hard rock
- Length: 139:42
- Label: Relativity
- Producers: Joe Satriani, John Cuniberti, Andy Johns

Joe Satriani chronology
The Extremist (1992)	Time Machine (1993)	Joe Satriani (1995)

Singles from Time Machine
- 1. "All Alone" Released: 1993; 2. "Time Machine" Released: 1993

Time Machine is the fifth studio album by guitarist Joe Satriani, released on October 13, 1993, through Relativity Records and reissued in 1998 through Epic Records. It is a double-disc album: the first disc contains a selection of new tracks, outtakes and unreleased studio recordings, while the second disc is composed of live recordings from 1988 and 1992.

The album reached No. 95 on the U.S. Billboard 200 and remained on that chart for eight weeks, as well as reaching No. 72 in the Netherlands and No. 87 in Germany. "All Alone" was released as a single, reaching No. 21 on Billboard's Mainstream Rock chart and receiving a nomination for Best Rock Instrumental Performance at the 1995 Grammy Awards, along with "Speed of Light" at the 1994 Grammys, Satriani's fifth and sixth such nominations. Time Machine was certified Gold on October 27, 1994.

== Overview ==
The album's 1998 reissue contains detailed liner notes explaining the story behind the content of both discs. Five tracks were originally recorded during the sessions for The Extremist (1992): "Crazy", "Banana Mango II", "Thinking of You", "Speed of Light" (featured on the soundtrack to the 1993 film Super Mario Bros.) and "Baroque". Four other tracks were previously released on Satriani's 1984 self-titled EP: "Banana Mango", "Dreaming #11", "I Am Become Death" and "Saying Goodbye". A fifth track from the EP, "Talk to Me", was not included due to its master tape being damaged.

== Recording locations ==
=== Disc one ===
The first disc was recorded in the following locations between 1984 and 1993:

- The Barn (Bearsville, New York) – 1990
- Hyde Street (San Francisco) – 1986–87
- The Plant (Sausalito, California) – 1991–93
- Record One (Sherman Oaks, California) – 1991–93
- Ocean Way (Los Angeles) – 1991–93
- Alpha and Omega Recordings (San Francisco) – 1986–87 and 1990–91
- Fantasy Studios (Berkeley, California) – 1990 and 1993
- Coast Recorders (San Francisco) – 1990–91
- The Site (Marin County, California) – May 1993

Most of the above locations were also used to record and mix his 1992 album, The Extremist.

=== Disc two ===
The second disc uses live recordings from three shows on the Extremist Tour and one show on the Surfing with the Alien tour. The recordings taken from the Extremist Tour are from the following shows:

- Tower Theater (Upper Darby Township, Pennsylvania) – December 3, 1992
- Orpheum Theatre (Boston) – December 23, 1992
- Hammersmith Apollo (London) – February 5, 1993

The recording taken from the Surfing with the Alien tour is from the following show:

- California Theatre (San Diego) – June 11, 1988

This show originally aired on the King Biscuit Flower Hour radio show on July 31, 1988. Three songs (Ice 9, Memories and Hordes of Locusts) were also used on the Dreaming #11 EP.

According to a 2014 interview with Joe for MusicRadar.com, the Roseland Ballroom show in New York City (December 5, 1992) was also recorded for this album but wasn't used.

The Hammersmith Apollo show was recorded for and broadcast by BBC Radio 1 on May 1, 1993, and repeated on October 23, 1993 (both times at 19:30). It was produced by Jeff Griffin and recorded by Mike Robinson.

== Critical reception ==
Professional ratings
Review scores
Source	Rating
AllMusic	4.5/5 stars

Phil Carter at AllMusic gave Time Machine 4.5 stars out of five, calling it "an excellent double-CD set providing something for just about everyone who's interested in Joe Satriani's music" and that "this set of recordings makes an excellent starting point for new fans and will give longtime fans something new as well."

== Track listing ==
=== Disc one ===
All tracks are written by Joe Satriani, except where noted.

No.	Title	Length
1.	"Time Machine"	5:07
2.	"The Mighty Turtle Head"	5:12
3.	"All Alone" (Billie Holiday, Mal Waldron; arrangement: Satriani)	4:22
4.	"Banana Mango II"	6:05
5.	"Thinking of You"	3:57
6.	"Crazy"	4:06
7.	"Speed of Light"	5:14
8.	"Baroque"	2:15
9.	"Dweller on the Threshold"	4:15
10.	"Banana Mango"	2:44
11.	"Dreaming #11"	3:37
12.	"I Am Become Death"	3:56
13.	"Saying Goodbye"	2:54
14.	"Woodstock Jam"	16:07
Total length:		69:51

=== Disc two ===
No.	Title	Length
1.	"Satch Boogie" (Tower Theater, Upper Darby Township, Pennsylvania, December 3, 1992)	3:58
2.	"Summer Song" (Orpheum Theatre, Boston, December 23, 1992)	6:01
3.	"Flying in a Blue Dream" (Hammersmith Apollo, London, February 5, 1993)	5:24
4.	"Cryin'" (Orpheum Theatre, Boston, December 23, 1992)	6:25
5.	"The Crush of Love" (Tower Theater, Philadelphia, December 3, 1992)	5:40
6.	"Tears in the Rain" (Tower Theater, Philadelphia, December 3, 1992)	1:58
7.	"Always with Me, Always with You" (Tower Theater, Philadelphia, December 3, 1992)	3:39
8.	"Big Bad Moon" (Tower Theater, Philadelphia, December 3, 1992)	5:23
9.	"Surfing with the Alien" (Orpheum Theatre, Boston, December 23, 1992)	4:39
10.	"Rubina" (Tower Theater, Philadelphia, December 3, 1992)	6:44
11.	"Circles" (California Theatre, San Diego, June 11, 1988)	4:14
12.	"Drum Solo" (California Theatre, San Diego, June 11, 1988)	2:14
13.	"Lords of Karma" (California Theatre, San Diego, June 11, 1988)	5:43
14.	"Echo" (California Theatre, San Diego, June 11, 1988)	7:49
Total length:		69:51

== Personnel ==
- Joe Satriani – vocals (track 6, 12), guitar, keyboard (tracks 1, 2, 4–6), bass (tracks 4, 6, 7, 9), harmonica, arrangement (track 3), production
- Phil Ashley – keyboard (tracks 6, 7, 14, live disc 1–10), sequencer (track 4)
- Tom Coster – organ (track 3)
- Jonathan Mover – drums (tracks 1–3, live disc 11–14), percussion (tracks 1, 2)
- Jeff Campitelli – drums (tracks 4, 6, 9), percussion (track 5), cymbals (track 5), hi-hat (track 5), drum programming (track 7)
- Simon Phillips – drums (track 4, 14)
- Gregg Bissonette – drums (live disc tracks 1–5, 7–10), bass drum (track 5)
- Stuart Hamm – bass (tracks 1–3, live disc 11, 13–14)
- Matt Bissonette – bass (track 5, live disc 1–5, 7–10)
- Doug Wimbish – bass (track 14)
- Bongo Bob Smith – drum programming (track 7)
- John Cuniberti – engineering, production, drum programming (track 7)
- Kooster McAllister – engineering
- Neil King – engineering assistance
- Bart Stevens – engineering assistance
- Michael Semanick – engineering assistance
- Dave Plank – engineering assistance
- Dan Bosworth – engineering assistance
- Kevin Scott – engineering assistance
- Michael Reiter – engineering assistance
- Bob Ludwig – mastering
- Andy Johns – production

== Charts ==
Chart (1993)	Peak position
Australian Albums (ARIA)	85
Dutch Albums (Album Top 100)	72
French Albums (SNEP)	8
German Albums (Offizielle Top 100)	87
UK Albums (Official Charts)	32
US Billboard 200	95

== Certifications ==
Region	Certification	Certified units/sales
United States (RIAA)	Gold	500,000^{^}
^{^} Shipments figures based on certification alone.

== Awards ==
Event	Title	Award	Result
1994 Grammys	"Speed of Light"	Best Rock Instrumental Performance	Nominated
1995 Grammys	"All Alone"	Best Rock Instrumental Performance	Nominated
