= Into the Sunset =

Into the Sunset may refer to:

- "Into the Sunset", a song by Mike Batt and Bonnie Tyler from The Dreamstone soundtrack album
- Riding into the Sunset, a bronze sculpture by Electra Waggoner Biggs

== See also ==
- Sunset (disambiguation)
