= Pitch axis =

Pitch axis may refer to:

== In music ==
- Pitch axis (music), the center about which a melody is inverted
- Pitch axis theory, a musical technique used in constructing chord progressions

== In mathematics and engineering ==
- Aircraft principal axes, the axes of an airplane in flight
- Yaw, pitch, and roll, a specific kind of Euler angles
