= Satch Boogie =

Song by Joe Satriani

from the album Surfing with the Alien
- Released: 1987
- Recorded: 1986
- Genre: Hard rock, instrumental rock
- Length: 3:13
- Label: Relativity; Epic (re-release)
- Songwriter: Joe Satriani
- Producers: Joe Satriani, John Cuniberti

"Satch Boogie" is the fifth track from the album Surfing with the Alien, and is along with "Surfing with the Alien" one of Satriani's most famous pieces. The composition was considered the 55th greatest guitar solo ever by Guitar World Magazine readers. The tap-on bridge played only on the fifth-string is an example of pitch axis theory. Deep Purple performed the song regularly during Satriani's tenure in the band.

== Chart positions ==
Year	Single	Chart	Position
1988	"Satch Boogie"	Billboard Mainstream Rock Tracks	22

== In other media ==
Appeared in Problem Child 2, during the food fight scene at Pizzariffic.

It also appears in the popular video game, Guitar Hero World Tour and in the game Guitar Hero On Tour: Decades; in these games, it is considered the most difficult song for the guitar instrument, especially at the Solo F section. It was also available as downloadable content for the Rock Band series. It is also available on Rocksmith 2014 as the hardest song to learn on lead guitar.
