= Dreaming No. 11 =

1988 EP by Joe Satriani

Dreaming #11

EP by Joe Satriani
- Released: November 1, 1988
- Recorded: June 11, 1988
- Venue: The California Theatre in San Diego
- Studio: Alpha & Omega Recording in San Francisco
- Genre: Instrumental rock
- Length: 23:23
- Label: Relativity
- Producer: Joe Satriani, John Cuniberti

Joe Satriani chronology
Surfing with the Alien (1987)	Dreaming #11 (1988)	Flying in a Blue Dream (1989)

Singles from Dreaming #11
- 1. "The Crush of Love" Released: 1988

Dreaming #11 is the second EP by guitarist Joe Satriani, released on November 1, 1988 through Relativity Records and reissued on May 27, 1997 through Epic Records. The EP reached No. 42 on the U.S. Billboard 200 and remained on that chart for 26 weeks. Its sole studio track, "The Crush of Love", reached No. 6 on Billboard's Mainstream Rock chart and was nominated for Best Rock Instrumental Performance at the 1990 Grammy Awards; this being Satriani's second such nomination. The remaining three tracks were recorded live as part of the King Biscuit Flower Hour during the Surfing with the Alien (1987) tour. The title track, absent on the EP, was present on Joe Satriani's 1986 debut EP of the same name, and would later be released on Satriani's 1993 compilation album Time Machine. Dreaming #11 was certified Gold on August 15, 1991.

== Critical reception ==
Professional ratings
Review scores
Source	Rating
AllMusic	2.5/5 stars

Phil Carter at AllMusic gave Dreaming #11 2.5 stars out of five, calling it "something of an oddity" and "A recommended disc for musicians and fans, but not essential to the casual collector."

== Track listing ==
All music is composed by Joe Satriani.

No.	Title	Length
1.	"The Crush of Love"	4:22
2.	"Ice Nine" (live - California Theatre, San Diego; June 11, 1988)	4:41
3.	"Memories" (live - California Theatre, San Diego; June 11, 1988)	9:08
4.	"Hordes of Locusts" (live - California Theatre, San Diego; June 11, 1988)	5:12
Total length:		23:23

== Personnel ==
- Joe Satriani – guitar, keyboard, bass (track 1), remixing, production
- Jeff Campitelli – drums (track 1)
- Jonathan Mover – drums (tracks 2–4)
- Bongo Bob Smith – percussion (track 1), sound replacement
- Stuart Hamm – bass (tracks 2–4)
- David Bianco – engineering (tracks 2–4)
- John Cuniberti – engineering, remixing, production
- David Plank – engineering assistance
- Bernie Grundman – mastering

== Charts ==
Chart (1988)	Peak position
US Billboard 200	42

== Certifications ==
Region	Certification	Certified units/sales
United States (RIAA)	Gold	500,000^{^}
^{^} Shipments figures based on certification alone.

== Awards ==
Event	Title	Award	Result
1990 Grammys	"The Crush of Love"	Best Rock Instrumental Performance	Nominated
