= Arkady Rylov =

Russian painter

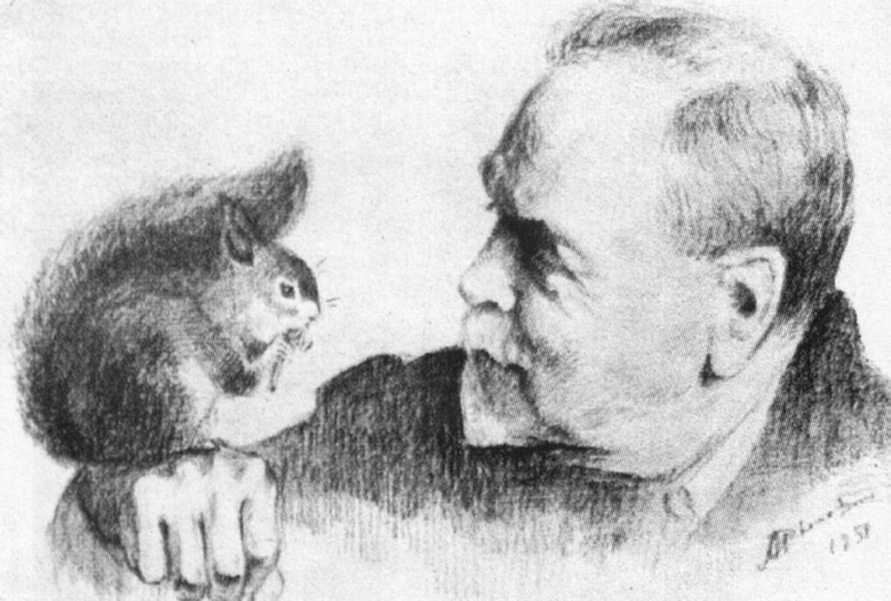
Self-portrait, 1939

Arkady Alexandrovich Rylov (Russian: Арка́дий Алекса́ндрович Рыло́в; 29 January [O.S. 17 January] 1870 – 22 June 1939) was a Russian and Soviet Symbolist painter.

== Biography ==
Rylov was born in the village of Istobensk, in the Vyatka Governorate of the Russian Empire (present-day Kirov Oblast, Russia). He was brought into the family of his stepfather, a notary (Rylov's father had a psychiatric illness). He moved to Saint Petersburg and studied at the Technical Design School of Baron Schtiglitz (1888–1891), then at the Imperial Academy of Arts under Arkhip Kuindzhi (1894–1897).

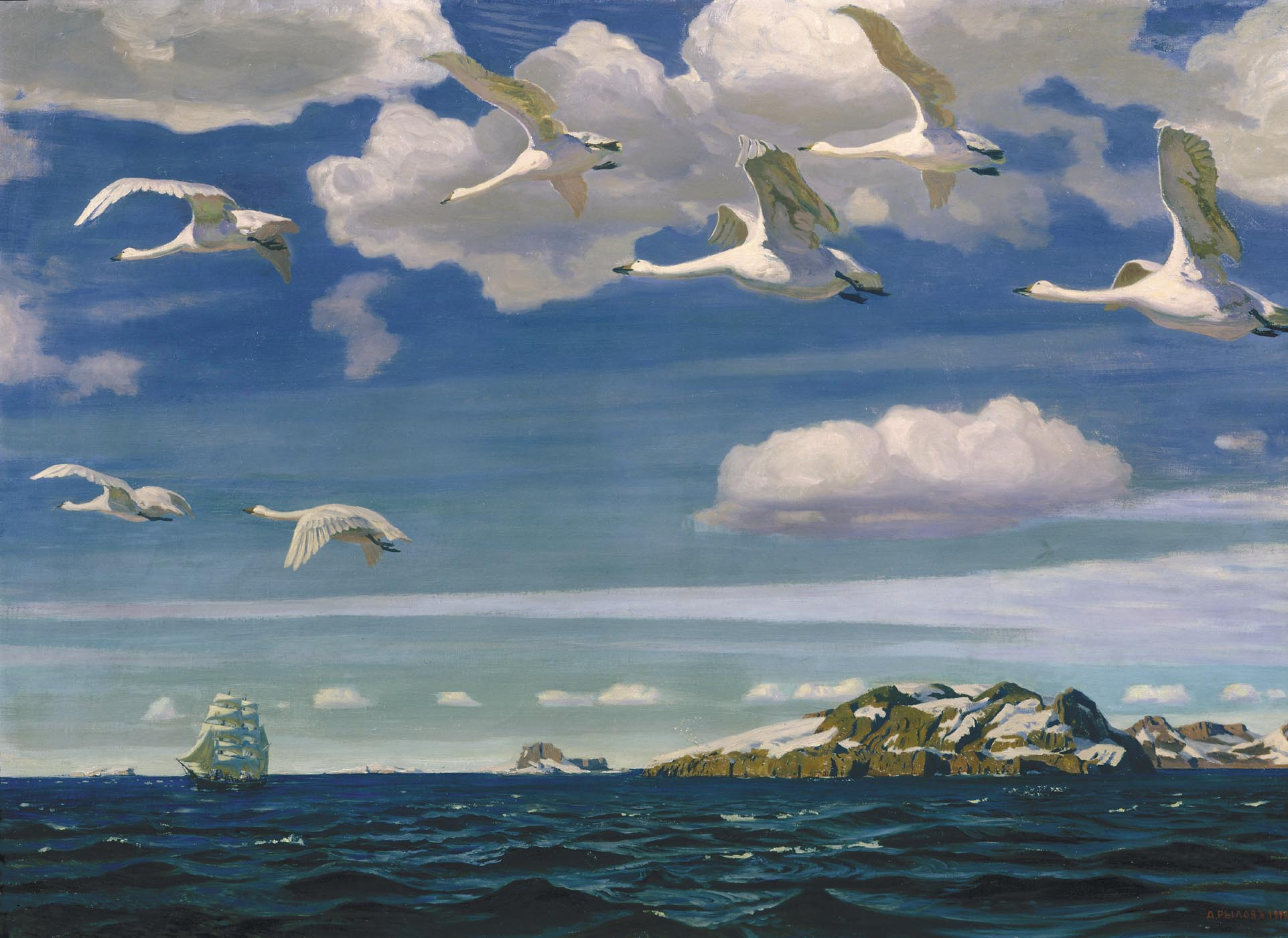
In High Azure, 1918

Rylov was a member of the Mir iskusstva movement and its spin-off Union of Russian Artists, and also a member of the Association of Artists of Revolutionary Russia. He was a chairman of the Kuindzhi Society.

He started as a historical painter (his graduation work in the Imperial Academy of Arts was Assault of Pechenegs on a Slav village) but became a predominantly landscape painter, though many of his paintings have some allusions with Russian history.

Many of his landscapes painted after the October Revolution were seen as symbols of revolutionary freedom. At that time he also painted some typical Socialist Realism compositions like Lenin in Razliv. He taught in the Academy of Arts. In his studio he created what could almost be described as a small nature reserve, with squirrels, rabbits, a monkey named Manka, many wild birds (without cages) and two anthills. According to Mikhail Nesterov wild animals and birds loved Rylov and often came to his studio.

== Notable works ==
Rylov's most renowned works are the Green Noise of 1904 showing a spring landscape with some early Slavic ships on the background and In High Azure of 1918 showing wild geese flying in the sky over a sea with some sailing ship in the bottom.

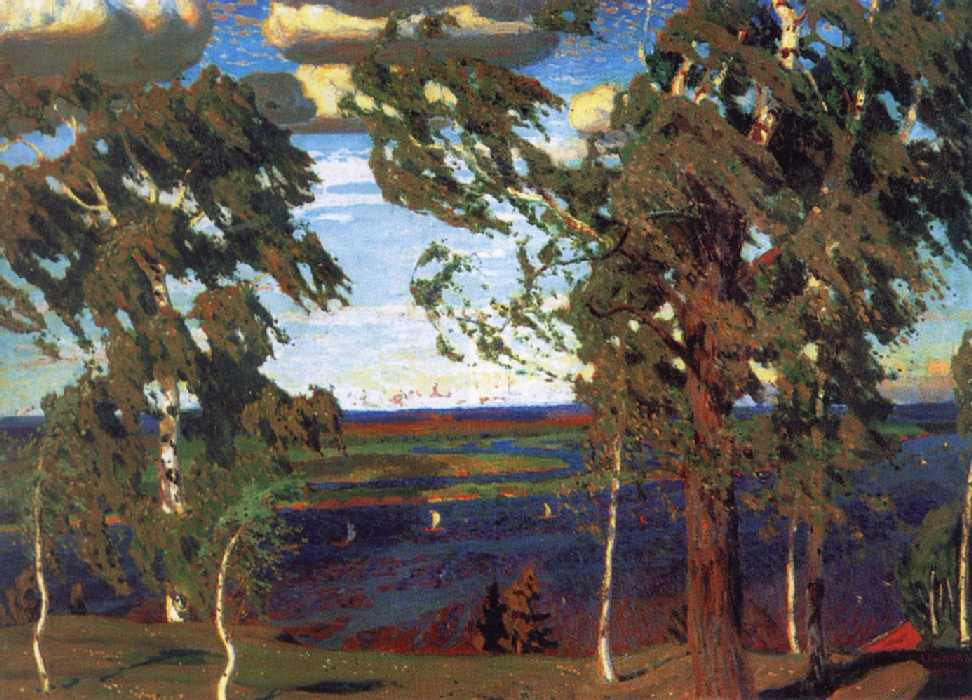
The Green Noise, 1904

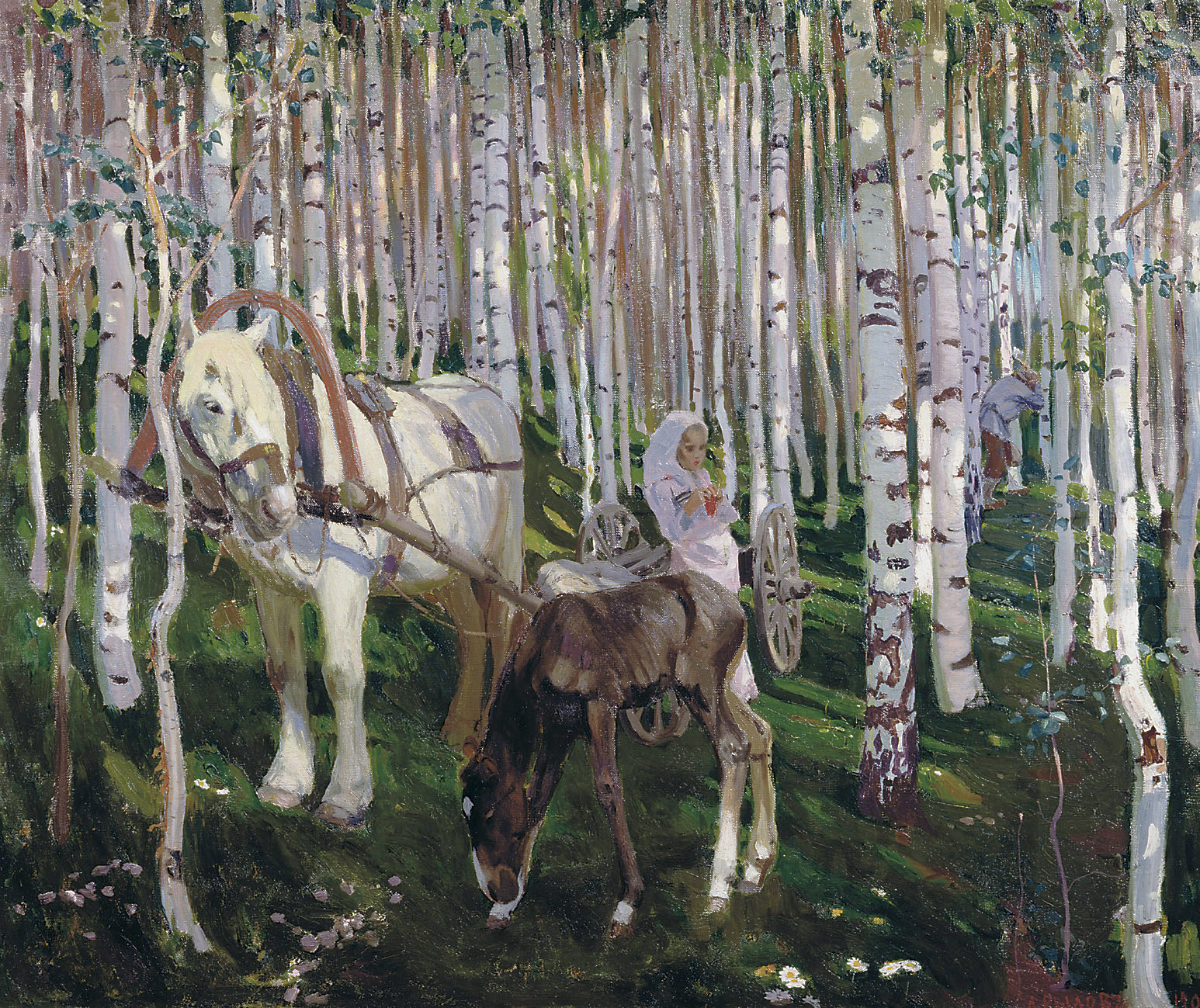
In the forest, 1905

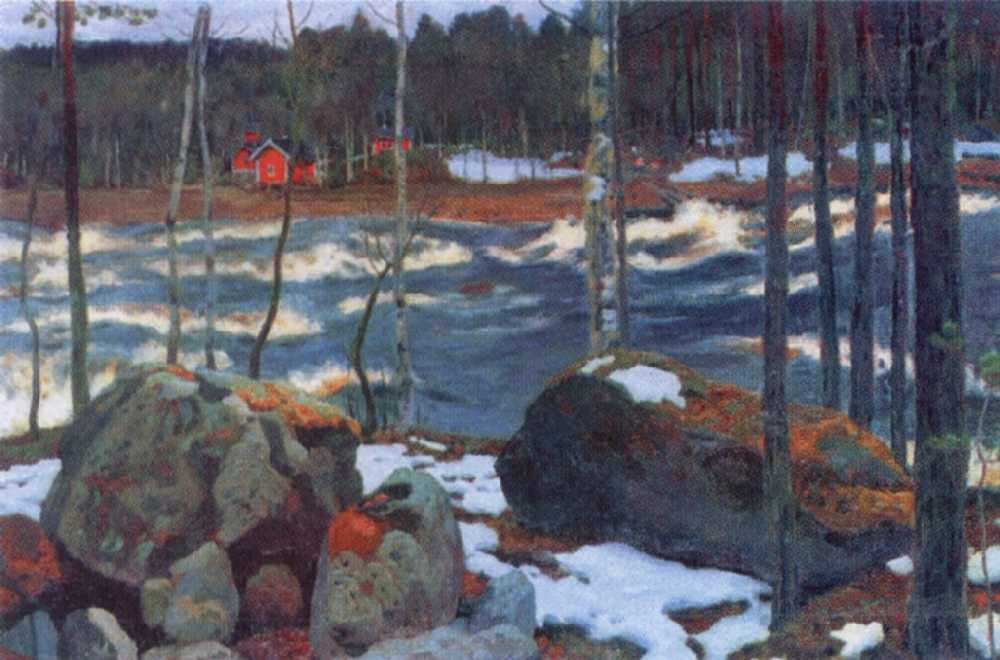
Thundering River, 1917

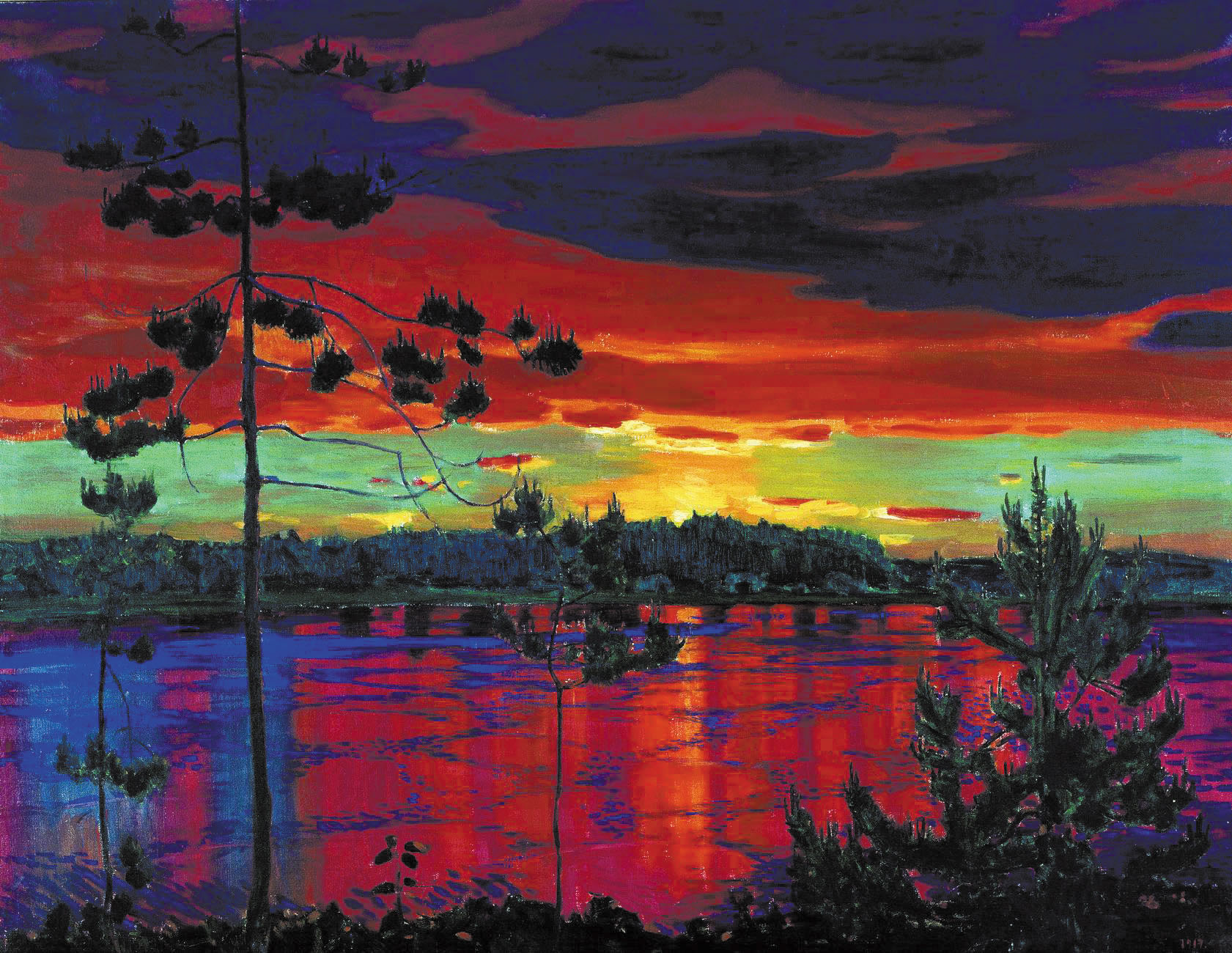
Sunset, 1917

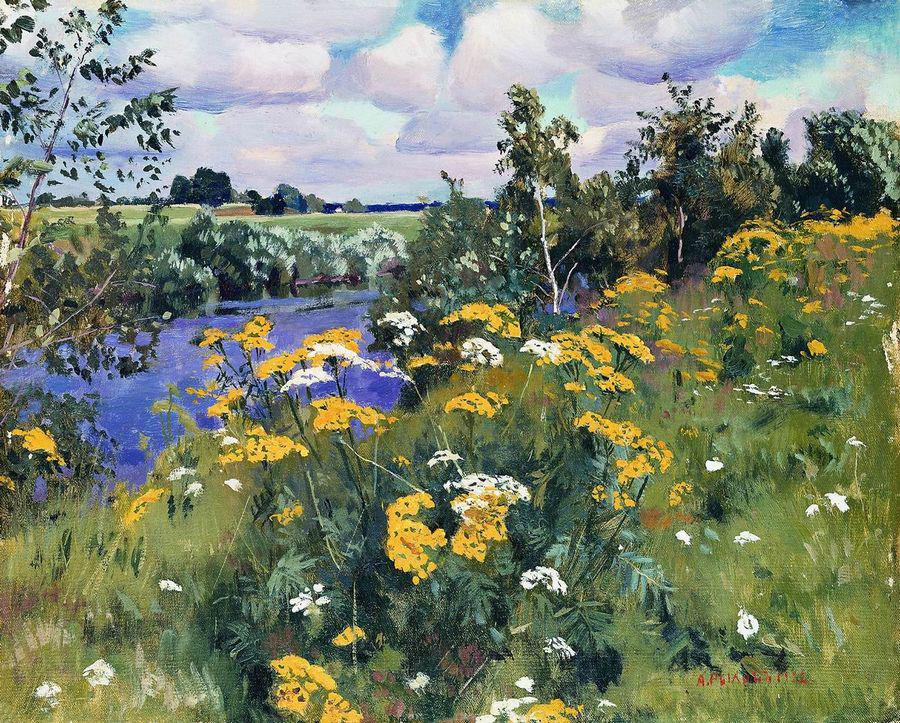
Wild Rowan (Polevaya Ryabinka), 1922

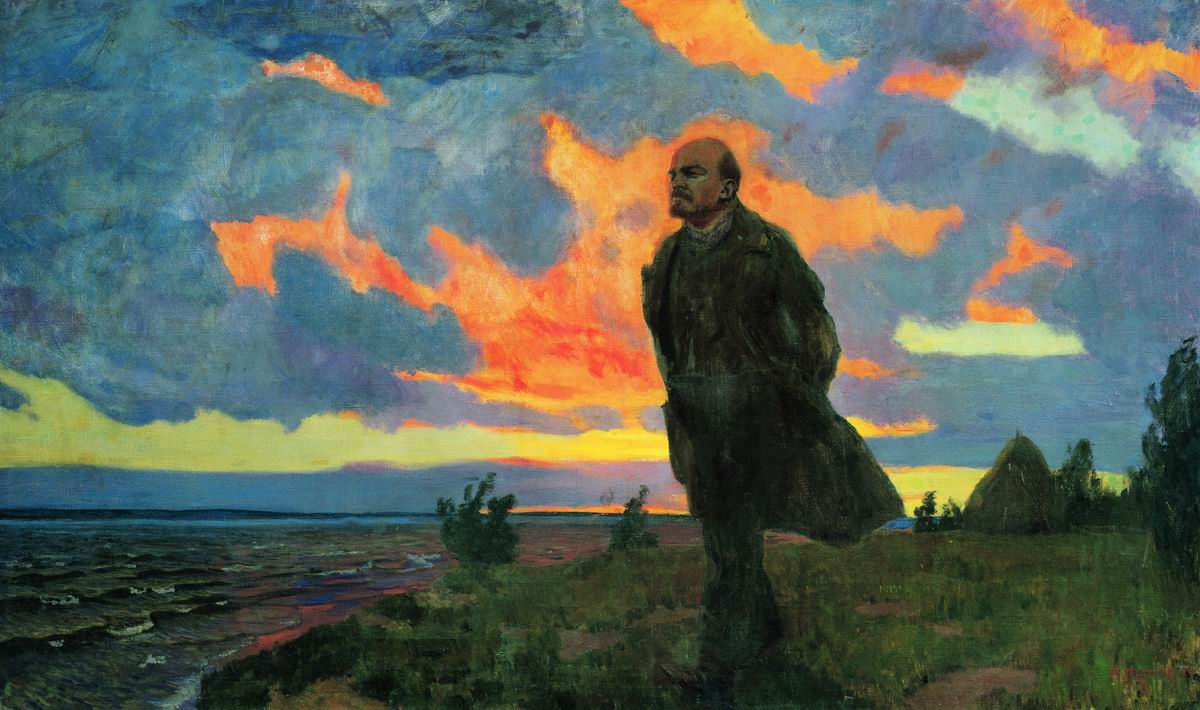
Lenin v Razlive, 1934

== See also ==
- Fine Art of Leningrad
