= In High Azure =

Painting by Arkady Rylov

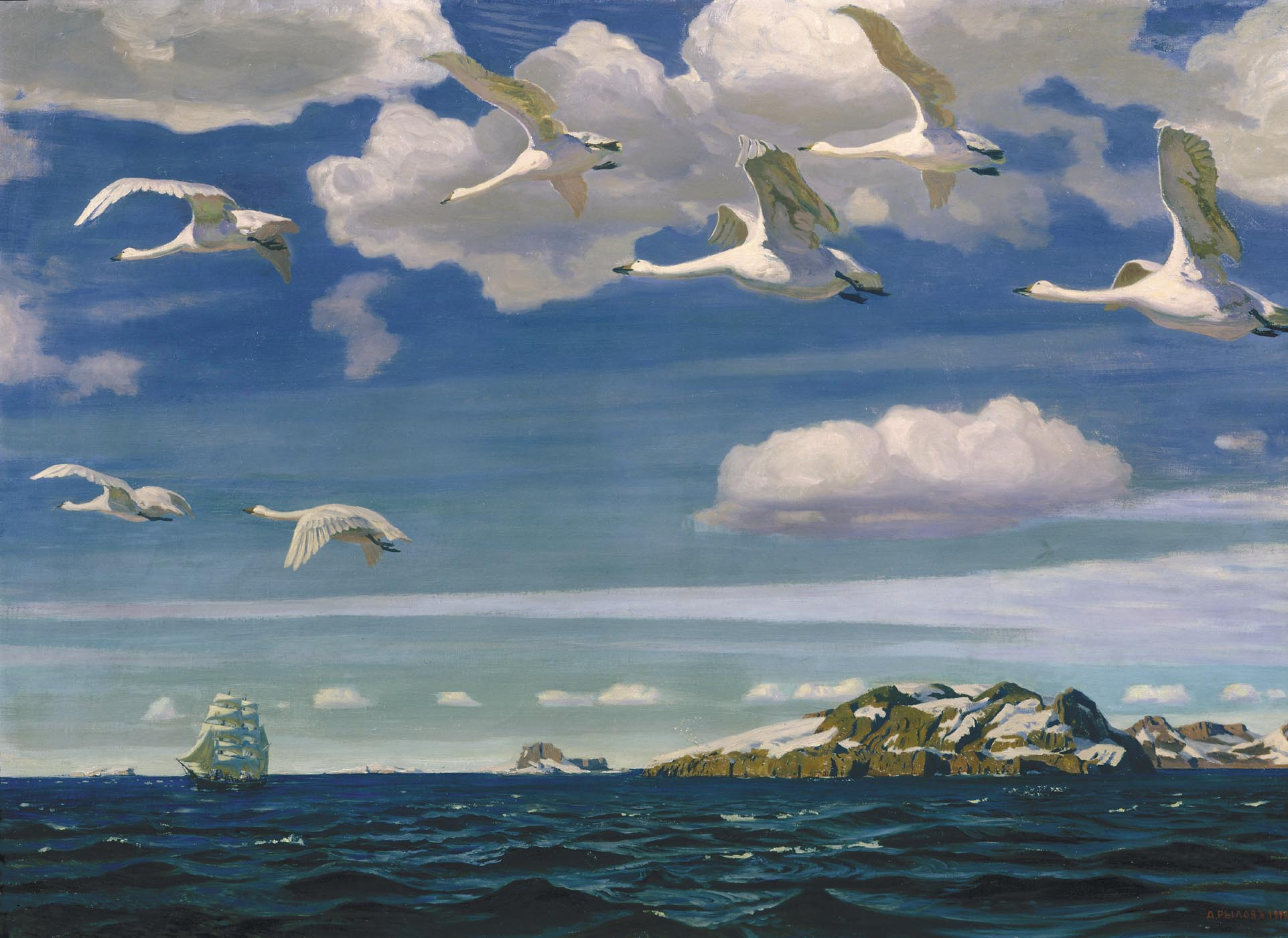
In High Azure

In High Azure («В голубом просторе») is a painting by Russian artist Arkady Rylov (1870–1939), painted in 1918 in Petrograd. It is exhibited in the Tretiakov Gallery, Moscow.

== Description ==
At the background of high azure sky and snow-white clouds we can see swans flying over the dark blue sea. Massive cold snow-covered rocks are seen on the horizon. There is a ship under full sail adding to romantic character of the dark stormy sea. The swans' flight is free and easy as if they swim in light transparent air. The outline of the clouds over the horizon emphasizes the birds' flight direction. Though they move from right to left you do not feel that the motion continues beyond the bounds of the picture. Swans seem to move towards the sailing ship and go back ( over snow-covered rocks) to the right corner of the canvas.

== Critics ==
Aleksei Fedorov-Davydov
