= Summer Song (Joe Satriani song) =

Single by Joe Satriani

from the album The Extremist
- Released: 1992
- Recorded: 1990–1992
- Genre: Instrumental rock
- Length: 5:00
- Label: Relativity
- Songwriter: Joe Satriani
- Producers: Joe Satriani, Andy Johns, John Cuniberti

Joe Satriani singles chronology
"Friends" (1992)	"Summer Song" (1992)	"Cryin'" (1992)

Music video
- "Summer Song" on YouTube

"Summer Song" is a single by guitarist Joe Satriani, released in 1992 through Relativity Records. The Australian edition of the single contains two instrumental tracks from his Grammy-nominated fourth studio album The Extremist, with "Summer Song" reaching No. 5 on the U.S. Billboard Mainstream Rock chart. A music video was also released, in which Satriani is seen playing the guitar with his band. The music video opens with the band on stage at a demolition derby. The video is tinted orange. Joe Satriani plays guitar with his band as the cars drive by.

== Track listing ==
=== European edition ===
All music is composed by Joe Satriani.

No.	Title	Length
1.	"Summer Song" (7" edit)
2.	"Summer Song" (album version)
3.	"Banana Mango (Version 2)"

=== Australian edition ===
No.	Title	Length
1.	"Summer Song" (7" edit)
2.	"Why"

== In popular culture ==
- "Summer Song" was featured in the 1995 PlayStation game Formula 1 and also the 2004 PlayStation 2 game Gran Turismo 4.
- In Indonesia, "Summer Song" was used during the intro of One Stop Football, broadcast by Trans7 from 2006 to 2011.
- In the Philippines, "Summer Song" was featured in the 2009 Pbl Pg Flex Linoleum Cup game.
