= Sunset (mango) =

Mango cultivar

Mangifera 'Sunset'
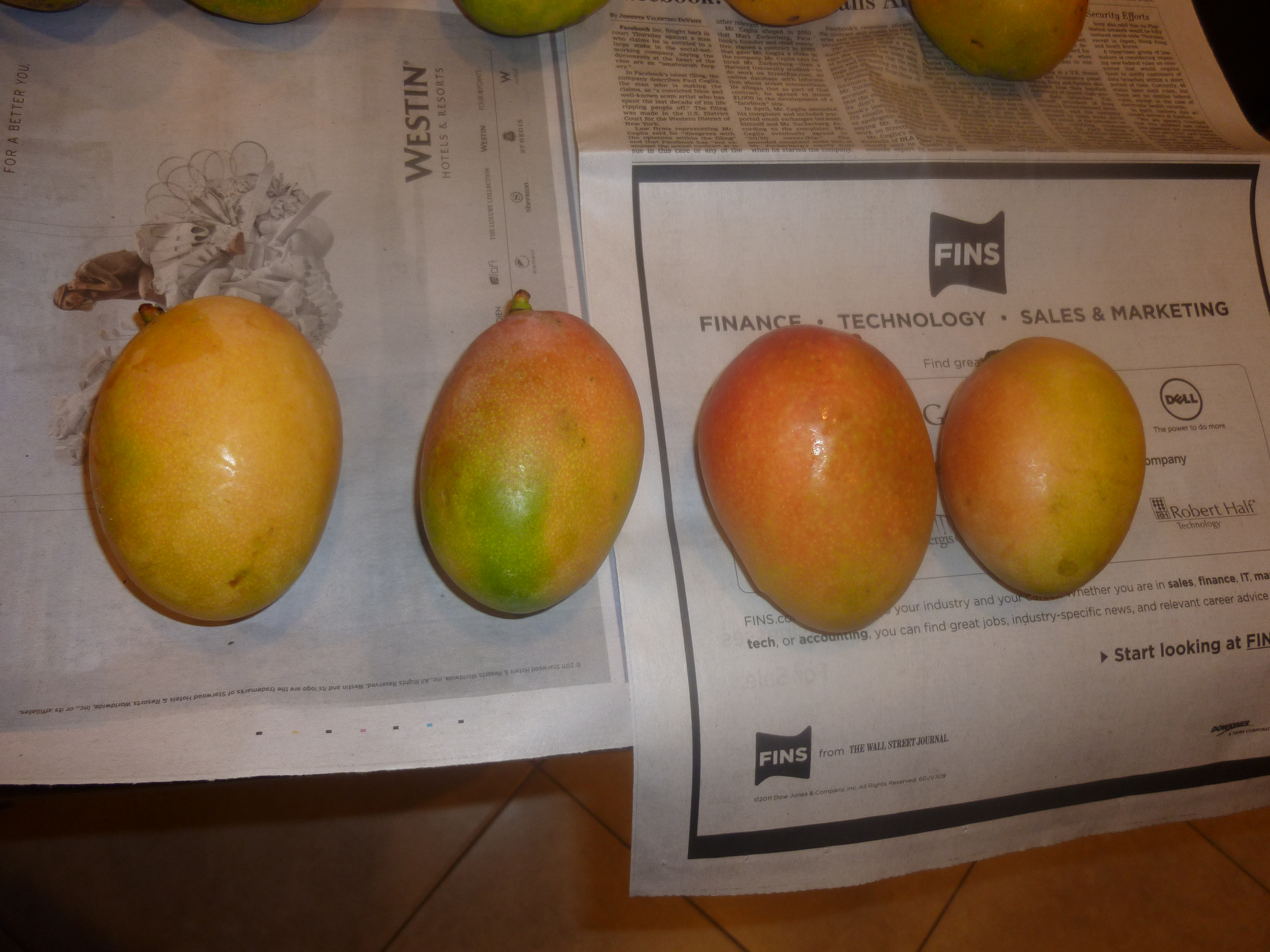
- Photograph of mature Sunset fruit
- Genus: Mangifera
- Species: Mangifera indica
- Hybrid parentage: 'Haden' x 'Amini'
- Cultivar: 'Sunset'
- Breeder: Frank Adams
- Origin: Florida, US

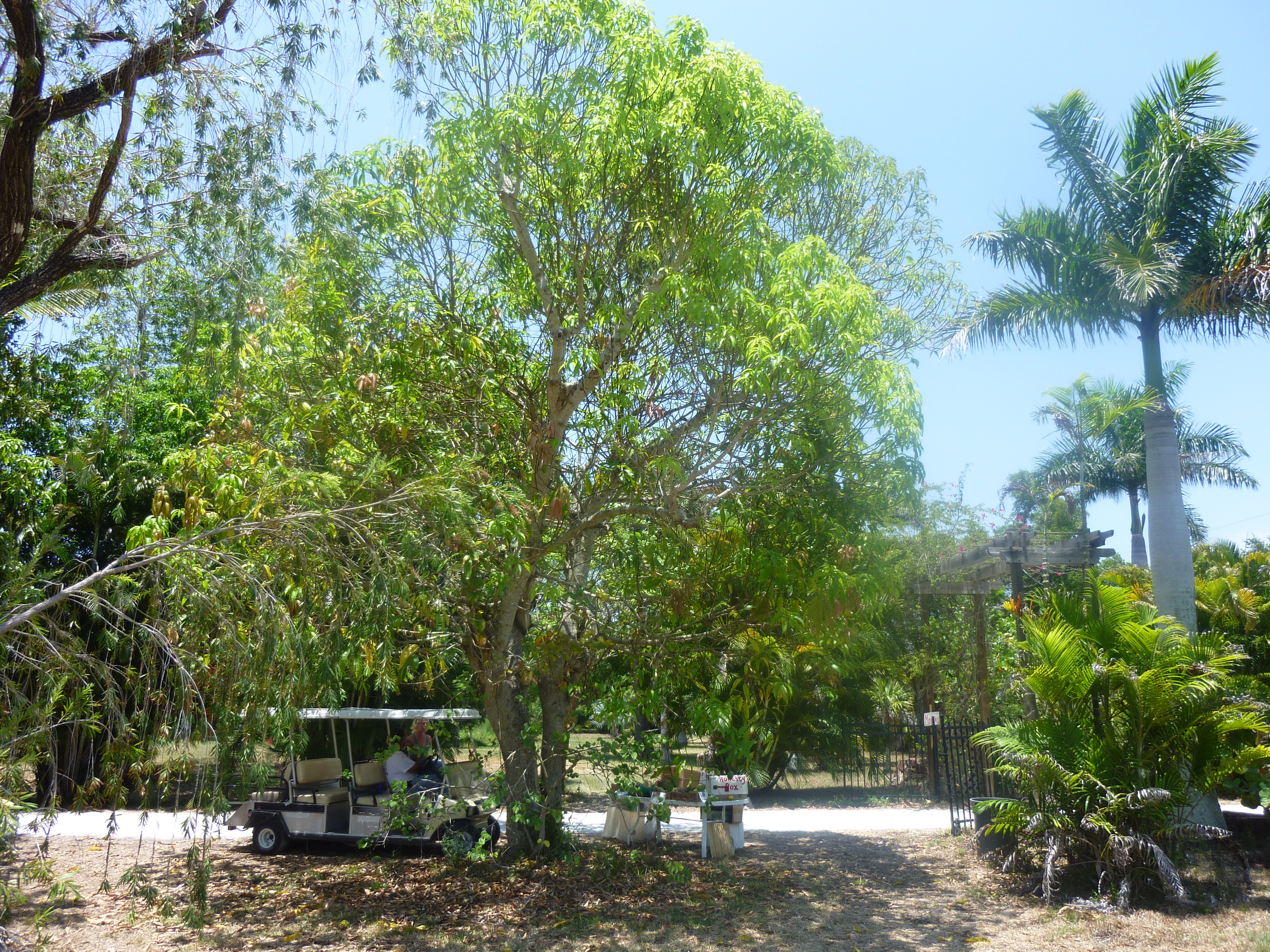
Photograph of a Sunset mango tree on the former property of Frank Adams in Bokeelia, Florida.

The 'Sunset' mango is a named mango cultivar that originated in southwest Florida.

== History ==
The original tree was grown from a seed planted in the grove of Frank Adams in Pine Island, Florida. The variety was considered to have potential and a grafted tree was planted at the Sub-Tropical Research Station in Homestead, Florida in 1947. For decades the parentage of Sunset was unknown, however a 2005 pedigree analysis estimated that it was a cross between the Haden and Amini cultivars.

Sunset did not become a popular commercial or nurserystock tree. Nevertheless, Sunset trees are part of the collections of the USDA's germplasm repository in Miami, Florida and the Miami-Dade Fruit and Spice Park in Homestead, Florida. Recently, Sunset garnered some attention when it was one of several varieties offered for public tasting at the 2010 International Mango festival at Fairchild Tropical Botanic Garden.

DNA analysis has indicated that Sunset is likely one of the parents of the Maha Chanok mango.

Sunset is sometimes confused with another variety named 'Ensey Sunset' (also called 'Indian Sunset') that originated on Merritt Island.

== Description ==
The fruit has oval shape with a rounded base and apex, and usually does not have a beak. Sunset mangoes average under a pound in weight at maturity and have yellow skin color, often with a dark red blush. The juicy and soft flesh is deep yellow in color with minimal fiber. It has a rich and sweet flavor and aroma, and contains a monoembryonic seed. The fruit typically ripen from June to July in Florida. The trees are very good producers.

The tree is a vigorous grower with a spreading canopy.

== See also ==
List of mango cultivars
