= Sunset (Rylov painting) =

1917 painting by Arkady Rylov

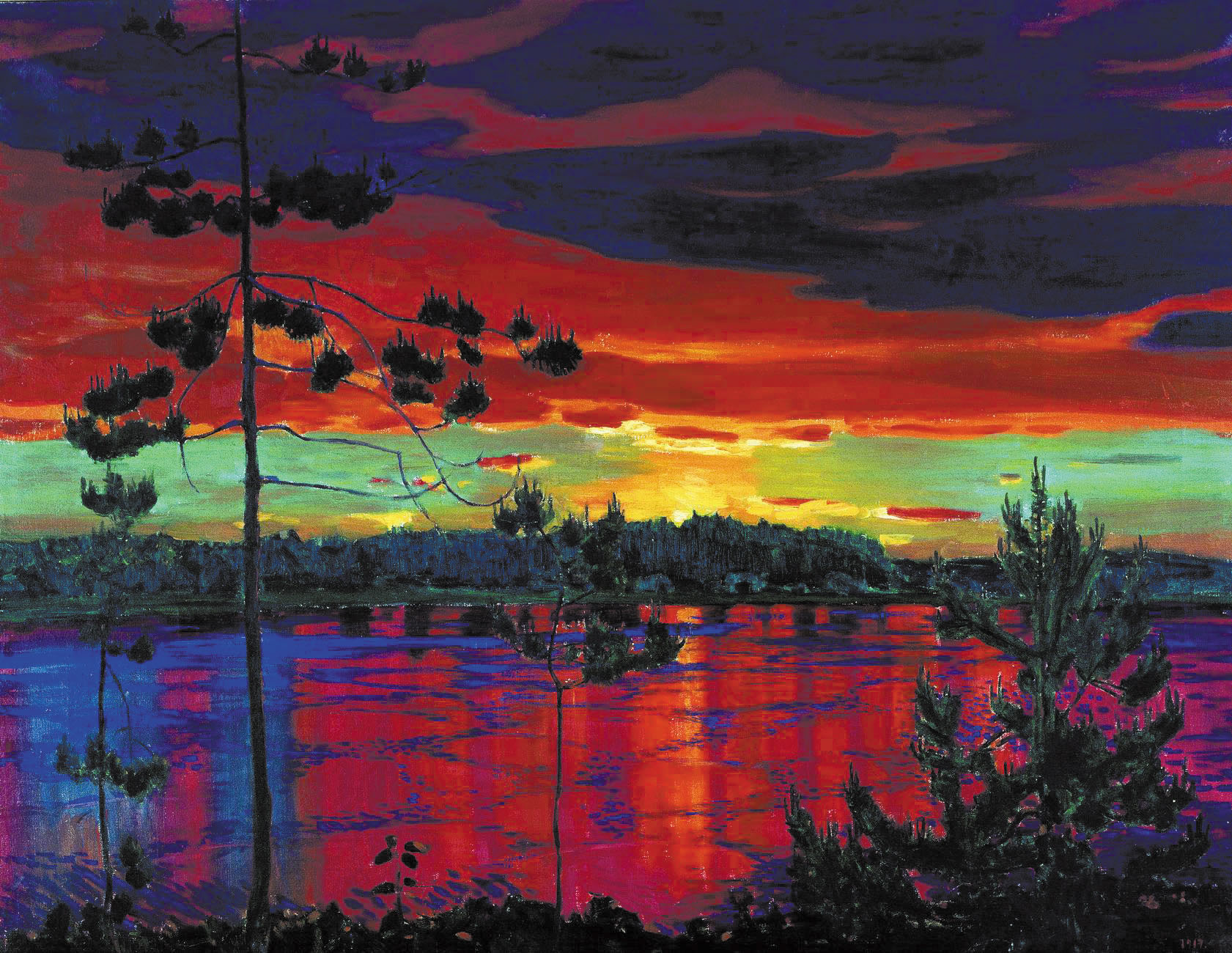
- Artist: Arkady Rylov
- Year: 1917
- Medium: Oil on canvas
- Location: Smolensk Art Museum, Smolensk

Sunset is an oil on canvas painting of 1917 by the Russian Symbolist artist Arkady Rylov. It depicts a red sun setting over a lacustrine landscape, the redness of the sunset symbolizing the dawning of the October Revolution. Rylov was a supporter of the Revolution, and considered the father of the Soviet landscape school.
