= Patsy Moore =

American singer-songwriter

- Also known as: P. Alexis Moore and Alex Moore
- Born: Patsy Alexis Moore; August 10, 1964 (age 62)
- Origin: Antigua and Barbuda
- Genres: Pop; World Music; Electronica
- Occupations: singer, songwriter, musician, record producer, poet, essayist, educator, publisher, filmmaker
- Instruments: vocals, keyboards, guitar, percussion
- Years active: 1988–present
- Labels: Warner Bros. (1990–1994); Papa Chuy (2006–present)
- Website: patsymooreDOTcom

Patsy Alexis Moore (born August 10, 1964 on the West Indian island of Antigua) is a singer-songwriter, as well as a poet, essayist, and educator. Raised in a devout Christian home, and an adult student of New Thought Metaphysics, she has spent most of her productive life in the United States.

== Youth ==
The elder daughter of a North American career military father (H. Douglas Moore of North Carolina) and Antiguan educator mother (June Looby), Moore's creative endeavors have been culled from a multicultural upbringing, persistent curiosity, and inventive mind. Her family moved frequently when she was a child. As a result of that experience, her music has always employed diverse influences—including African and Caribbean rhythms, folk, soul, Latin, rock, pop and funk.

== Education ==
Once valedictorian and twice salutatorian in her pre-post secondary years, Moore enrolled at the University of North Carolina at Chapel Hill in 1982. She performed in a band throughout college—singing, writing songs and playing keyboards. While majoring in Broadcast Journalism and minoring in Film and Speech Communications, she decided a career in music was of greater interest to her and began working towards that end.

== Early career ==
Moore moved to Nashville, Tennessee, in 1988. After singer-songwriter/music producer David Mullen (a new acquaintance) asked her to sing backup on a demo, she started composing and performing with others. Her distinctive writing style quickly gained attention in the music community, and a tune she believed to be fun but dismissible ("Talk About Life") became the title track of Reunion Records artist Kim Hill's second album. Moore was hired as a staff writer at McSpadden Group and a record deal with Warner Brothers soon followed. Under the Warner imprint, Moore completed two projects—Regarding the Human Condition (1991) and the flower child's guide to love and fashion (1993).

== Continuing career ==
Numerous performers have covered Moore's tunes since 1989, among the most notable is jazz world favorite Dianne Reeves—who, in 1999, recorded "I Remember" and "Goodbye".

That same year, Moore joined keyboardist Charles Mims (Patrice Rushen, Tracy Chapman) in writing, arranging and producing Kwanzaa for Young People (and Everyone Else!) (Charphelia Records)—a CD and educator resource guide garnering numerous commendations, including Teachers’ Choice, Parent Council, Parents’ Choice and Kids First awards.

At the start of 2005, Los Angeles's Walt Disney Concert Hall débuted Misa Justa, a symphonic jazz mass by Argentine-born composer Eduardo Gutiérrez del Barrio, performed by the Los Angeles Philharmonic, a large choir, and a small group of soloists. That ambitious work, widely described as "a celebration of womanhood", features five sung poems written by Moore.

== Present day ==
Twelve years following her stint as a Warner Brothers recording artist, Patsy Moore resurfaced with the independent releases of a book—Essays and Letters: Volume I (2002–2005) (Patchouli Grove Publishers), a collection of writings touching on the topics of art, politics, religion and spirituality, war and peace, and the author's longtime battle with cancer; a music single—"The Curve", a precursor to "The Most Private Confessions of Saint Clair: Studio Renderings" (Papa Chuy Productions), a full-length CD slated for release in late summer 2007; and a developing humanitarian NPO (The Arts in Action Caucus) designed to facilitate artists in aiding the world's most needy.

In addition to her work as an artist, Patsy Moore is the founder/senior editor of The Bohemian Aesthetic, (an online arts/culture/activism/current affairs magazine), co-owner of Papa Chuy (a music and film production company), and creator of Patsy Moore's Song Masters Seminar Series.

== Discography ==
- 1989 – Kim Hill Talk About Life (Reunion Records)
- 1989 – Mitchel Dane Starry Nights (Thinking Art)
- 1990 – Libby Buisson Merry Christmas All Year Long (Celebration)
- 1991 – Trace Balin Out of the Blue (Word Records)
- 1992 – Patsy Moore Regarding the Human Condition (Warner Bros. Records)
- 1992 – Various Artists The Singles (Warner Alliance)
- 1993 – Various Artists Operation Angel Wings (Word Records)
- 1993 – Various Artists The Compassion Festival Cassette (Compassion International)
- 1994 – Various Artists Sisters: Songs of Friendship, Joy and Encouragement for Women (Warner Alliance)
- 1994 – Various Artists Sizzlin' Sounds Collection (Warner Alliance)
- 1994 – Patsy Moore the flower child's guide to love and fashion (Warner Bros. Records)
- 1994 – Various Artists Body Shaping (Warner Alliance)
- 1994 – Bliss Bliss Bliss Bliss (R.E.X. Records)
- 1994 – Various Artists À Capella Contemporary Classics (StarSong Records)
- 1995, 1997 – Various Artists Another Kind of Christmas (a/k/a A Café Christmas) (Regency)
- 1995 – Clay Crosse Time to Believe (Reunion Records)
- 1995, 2001 – Bill Cantos Who Are You? (Pioneer Records)
- 1997 – Dianne Reeves That Day (Blue Note Records)
- 1998 – Vibe Tribe (Featuring Richard S.) Foreign Affairs (Lipstick)
- 1999 – Dianne Reeves Bridges (Blue Note Records)
- 1999 – Various Artists Kwanzaa for Young People (and Everyone Else!) (Charphelia)
- 2007 – Patsy Moore The Most Private Confessions of Saint Clair: Studio Renderings (Papa Chuy)
- 2011 – Patsy Moore Expatriates (Papa Chuy)
