= Sunset, West Virginia =

- Ghost town
- Location within West Virginia
- Coordinates: 38°12′00″N 79°56′39″W
- Country: United States
- State: West Virginia
- County: Pocahontas
- Elevation: 2,375 ft (724 m)
- GNIS feature ID: 1728170

Sunset is a ghost town in Pocahontas County, West Virginia. Sunset was 3.5 miles (5.6 km) northeast of Minnehaha Springs. Sunset appeared on USGS maps as late as 1901.

The community lies west of Sunrise, Virginia, hence the name.
