= Surfing with the Alien =

Studio album by Joe Satriani
- Released: October 15, 1987
- Studios: Alpha & Omega (San Francisco); Hyde Street (San Francisco)
- Genres: Instrumental rock; hard rock; jazz fusion
- Length: 37:37
- Label: Relativity
- Producers: Joe Satriani, John Cuniberti

Joe Satriani chronology
| Not of This Earth (1986) | Surfing with the Alien (1987) | Dreaming #11 (1988) |

Singles from Surfing with the Alien
- 1. "Surfing with the Alien" / "Ice 9" Released: 1987; 2. "Always with Me, Always with You" / "Hill of the Skull" Released: 1987; 3. "Satch Boogie" Released: 1987

Alternative cover
- 2019 reissue

Surfing with the Alien is the second studio album by American rock guitarist Joe Satriani. It was released on October 15, 1987, by Relativity Records. The album is one of Satriani's most successful to date and helped establish his reputation as a respected rock guitarist.

== Recording ==
The album was recorded on a budget of $13,000. Satriani's equipment was limited by the budget, consisting of two Kramer Pacer guitars and an adapted Stratocaster guitar, for which he would change the pickups to get different sounds. His guitar effects included a Roland JC-120, a Marshall '68 half-stack, and a Rockman.

Due to the limited budget, Satriani had to use whatever studio time and rooms were available, and as a result printed his effects to tape while tracking. This proved fortuitous for "Surfing with the Alien", whose solo was recorded with a malfunctioning Eventide H949 as his allotted studio time nearly ended.

To save money, the album heavily used drum machines, programmed by Bongo Bob Smith, with Jeff Campitelli recording overdubs of hi-hats, cymbals, toms and snares. Satriani stated this gave the music an "awkward charm", and maintained the combination of loose guitar playing and machine-like drum programming.

"Satch Boogie" is the only song to fully feature live drums, played by Campitelli. The song was originally recorded to a drum machine pattern, and the quick fade-out disguised the sound of the drum machine being picked up by the amplifier at the end.

== Composition ==
Satriani described the arrangements of the album as follows:

"Even though my sensibilities were driving me to be very succinct on the record—with very obvious chorus, bridge, and verse sections—after I tracked the outro to “Surfing,” I dug it so much that it set the template for the rest of the record. As a result, the outros turned into the spots where I could relax a little bit and go nuts."

The heavy metal-influenced "Crushing Day" contains the only solo on the album that was worked out beforehand, due to its length; the others are improvised. Satriani expressed regret for this decision later, as he felt constrained when having to play the song on stage.

A Casio CZ-101 was used to record the flute and orchestral instruments on "Midnight".

It contains fast and complex songs such as the title track and "Satch Boogie", which helped to further popularize shred guitar during that time. By contrast slower, melodic songs such as "Always with Me, Always with You" and "Echo" provide a change of pace. "Midnight" utilizes the technique of two-handed tapping at high tempo, evoking a Spanish fingerstyle effect. "Ice 9" references the fictional apocalyptic substance from Kurt Vonnegut's 1963 novel Cat's Cradle.

== Artwork ==
The cover art of the original release depicts the Marvel Comics character Silver Surfer on the front, with the hand of Galactus on the back cover. The artwork, which was licensed from the publisher, is taken from a panel from Silver Surfer #1 (1982), drawn by John Byrne. Byrne did not receive a royalty for the art's use on the album cover. Satriani was unfamiliar with the Silver Surfer and had named the album and title track without the character in mind. However, Jim Kozlowski, the production manager for Relativity Records, was a comic book fan and had used the nickname "The Silver Surfer" as a radio DJ name. He suggested using the character for the album cover. Kozlowski presented the album to Marvel and obtained permission to use the character. Subsequently, Marvel Comics has paid homage to Satriani in Silver Surfer comics ("the planet Satriani") and Satriani has named later compositions after other elements of the Silver Surfer mythos ("Back to Shalla-Bal", "The Power Cosmic 2000").

The original license to use the character artwork cost $5000 and was time-limited to 20 years. Though the license was renewed multiple times, in 2018, Satriani and Marvel could not come to terms on a price, and so the cover art was replaced. As of 2018, digital retailers such as iTunes and Spotify display an alternative artwork that does not feature the Silver Surfer. In 2019 a limited deluxe edition of the album was released featuring a silver guitar headstock in place of the Silver Surfer. The colors of this new artwork are similar to the original.

== Release and reception ==
Professional ratings
Review scores
| Source | Rating |
|---|---|
| AllMusic | 4.5/5 stars |
| Encyclopedia of Popular Music | 4/5 stars |
| The Rolling Stone Album Guide | 4/5 stars |
| The Village Voice | C+ |

Released on October 15, 1987, by Relativity Records, Surfing with the Alien charted at number 29 on the Billboard 200, proving to be Satriani's third highest-charting album in the United States. It remained on Billboard 200 for 75 weeks, the longest run of any of his releases. Surfing with the Alien was certified Gold on February 17, 1989, and Platinum on February 3, 1992, having shipped one million copies in the US. It was Satriani's first album to earn platinum certification, and remains his only studio album to have done so. Colin Larkin observed that, despite offering no vocal accompaniment, the record "was a major seller and brought mainstream respect to an artist often felt ot be too clinical or technical for such reward."

Two singles from the album reached Billboard's Mainstream Rock chart: "Satch Boogie" at No. 22 and "Surfing with the Alien" at No. 37. A third single, "Always with Me, Always with You", received a nomination for Best Pop Instrumental Performance at the 1989 Grammy Awards, while the album itself was nominated for Best Rock Instrumental Performance at the same event, Satriani's first two of many such nominations. Live versions of "Always with Me, Always with You" would later be nominated for Best Rock Instrumental twice more, at the 2002 and 2008 Grammys.

In a contemporary review for The Village Voice, music critic Robert Christgau snidely referred to Satriani as "the latest guitar god" and felt he is too much of a formalist, because he not only composes but edits his guitar melodies: "Thus he delivers both the prowess cultists demand and the comfort they secretly crave". In a retrospective review for AllMusic, Stephen Thomas Erlewine was more impressed by his technical abilities and praised Surfing with the Alien, writing that it "can be seen as the gold standard for guitar playing of the mid- to late '80s, an album that captures everything that was good about the glory days of shred." According to The Rolling Stone Album Guide (1992), the record "put Satriani on the map. Beautifully played and well-paced, it manages to capture all the icy fire of fusion jazz without losing any of the visceral power of rock & roll".

== Reissues ==
Surfing with the Alien has been reissued several times. A remastered edition of the album was first released on July 27, 1999 through Epic Records, which featured expanded liner notes. A second remaster celebrating the album's 20th anniversary was released on August 7, 2007 through Epic/Legacy Recordings; this is a double-disc set comprising the album itself with further expanded liner notes, as well as a DVD featuring Satriani's live performance at the 1988 Montreux Jazz Festival, music videos for "Always with Me, Always with You" and "Satch Boogie", and additional bonus material. To promote the 2007 reissue, Satriani played exclusive club gigs in select cities.

The most recent reissue of Surfing with the Alien was part of The Complete Studio Recordings, released on April 22, 2014 through Legacy Recordings; this is a box set compilation containing newly remastered editions of every Satriani studio album from 1986 to 2013.

For Record Store Day Black Friday 2019, the album was re-released as a limited edition, gatefold cover on colored vinyl. The album included a hype sticker that read, "Surfing is now 'Stripped'". "Brand New Limited Edition Features The Original Album + All Of The Backing Tracks. Joe's Leads Have Been Removed, Allowing You To Play Lead On This Iconic Album, The Perfect Audiophile Guitar Player Experience." The release included the original version of the album on red vinyl and the "stripped" version on yellow vinyl. The album artwork has been modified for this release, showing only the headstock of Joe's guitar, instead of the surfer while the background maintains a similar color scheme as the original.

== Track listing ==
All music is composed by Joe Satriani.

| No. | Title | Length |
|---|---|---|
| 1. | "Surfing with the Alien" | 4:25 |
| 2. | "Ice 9" | 4:00 |
| 3. | "Crushing Day" | 5:14 |
| 4. | "Always with Me, Always with You" | 3:22 |
| 5. | "Satch Boogie" | 3:13 |
| 6. | "Hill of the Skull" | 1:48 |
| 7. | "Circles" | 3:28 |
| 8. | "Lords of Karma" | 4:48 |
| 9. | "Midnight" | 1:42 |
| 10. | "Echo" | 5:37 |
| Total length: | | 37:37 |

=== 2007 remastered edition bonus DVD ===
| No. | Title | Length |
|---|---|---|
| 1. | "Ice 9" |
| 2. | "Memories" |
| 3. | "Midnight" |
| 4. | "Rubina" |
| 5. | "Circles" |
| 6. | "Lords of Karma" |
| 7. | "Bass solo" |
| 8. | "Echo" |
| 9. | "Hordes of Locusts" |
| 10. | "Always with Me, Always with You" |
| 11. | "Satch Boogie" |
| 12. | "Satch Boogie" (music video) |
| 13. | "Always with Me, Always with You" (music video) |
| 14. | "Bonus material" |

== Personnel ==
- Joe Satriani – guitar, electric sitar, keyboard, drum programming, percussion, bass, arrangement, production
- Bongo Bob Smith – drum programming, percussion, sound design
- Jeff Campitelli – drums, percussion
- John Cuniberti – percussion, engineering, remastering (reissue), production
- Jeff Kreegar – pre-production programming, sound design
- Bernie Grundman – mastering

== Charts ==
=== Weekly charts ===
| Chart (1987–90) | Peak position |
|---|---|
| Australian Albums (ARIA) | 10 |
| Canada Top Albums/CDs (RPM) | 53 |
| New Zealand Albums (RMNZ) | 16 |
| US Billboard 200 | 29 |

| Chart (2007) | Peak position |
|---|---|
| UK Rock & Metal Albums (Official Charts) | 22 |

=== Year-end charts ===
| Chart (1989) | Peak position |
|---|---|
| Australian Albums (ARIA) | 72 |

== Certifications ==
| Region | Certification | Certified units/sales |
|---|---|---|
| Australia (ARIA) | Gold | 35,000^{^} |
| United Kingdom (BPI) | Silver | 60,000^{*} |
| United States (RIAA) | Platinum | 1,000,000^{^} |
^{*} Sales figures based on certification alone.^{^} Shipments figures based on certification alone.
