= Sunset (Delacroix) =

Drawing by Eugène Delacroix

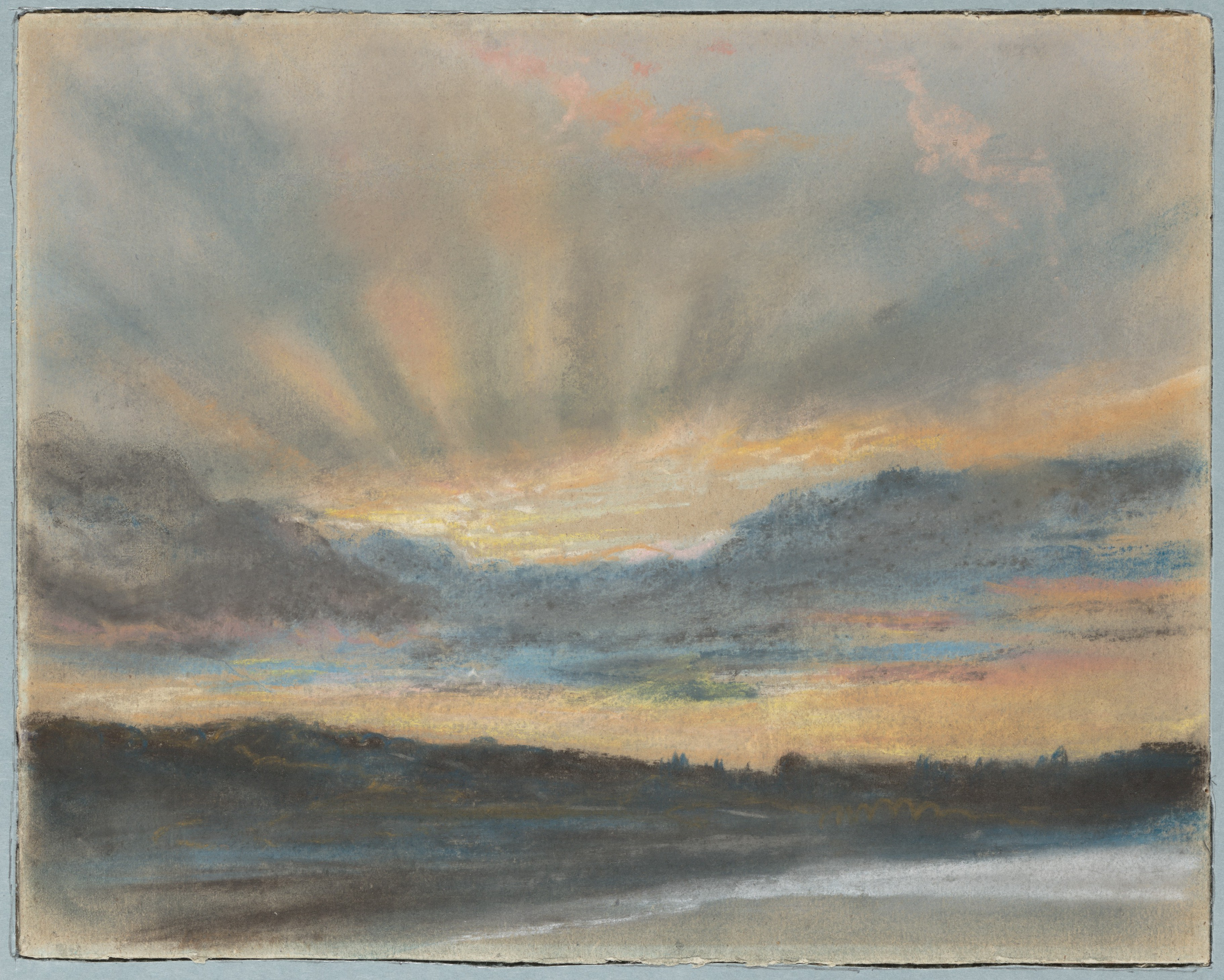
- Artist: Eugène Delacroix
- Year: c. 1850
- Medium: Pastel on paper
- Dimensions: 20.4 cm × 25.9 cm (8.0 in × 10.2 in)
- Location: Metropolitan Museum of Art

Sunset is a mid-19th-century drawing by the French artist Eugène Delacroix. Done in oil pastel on lined paper, the work depicts a sunset behind and above a gently sloping landscape.

== Description ==
While Delacroix was widely noted for his figure-centric romanticist paintings, he produced a number of expressive landscape works during his later years. Among these works is Sunset, done by Delacroix circa 1850. The drawing depicts a sunset partially blocked by two cloud formations, one directly above the Earth and a second, thicker band along the top of the painting. Despite these obstructions, the rays of sunlight are visibly breaking through, leading some to compare the painting to Delcroix's earlier work on the Galerie d'Apollon.
