= Sunset (apple) =

Apple cultivar

Malus domestica 'Sunset'
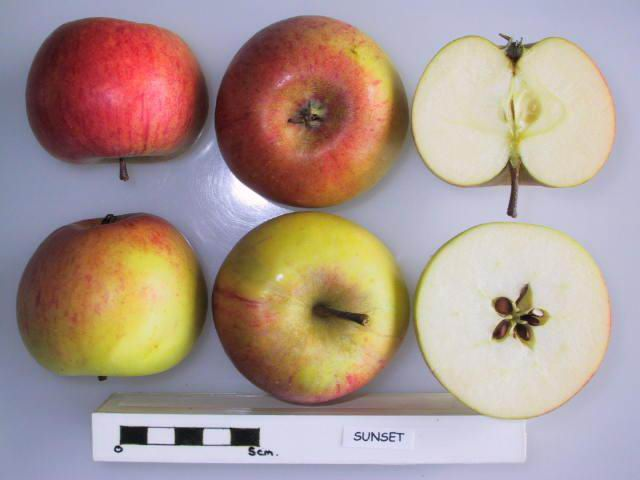
- Hybrid parentage: 'Cox's Orange Pippin' × ?
- Cultivar: 'Sunset'
- Origin: Developed by G.C. Addy circa 1918, Ightham, Kent, UK

The Sunset is an apple cultivar derived from the Cox's Orange Pippin cultivar. Both are found in Great Britain. The fruit has red stripes and an orange flush over a gold background. Usually, part of the apple is red while part of it is yellow. It is similar to 'Cox's Orange Pippin' in that it displays some russetting. The 'Pixie' apple is a distant descendant.

The Sunset's UK National Fruit Collection accession number is 1979-190. Its Orange Pippin Cultivator ID number is 1059.

== Growing ==
The Sunset Apple is a popular alternative to Cox's Orange Pippen as it is regarded as easier to grow. The cultivar self-fertilizes and is a heavy cropper but requires thinning to avoid small fruit. It is the third flowering group. It is picked in late-September. The Sunset is known for attracting bees, beneficial insects, birds, butterflies/moths, and other pollinators. The tree is known to grow from 2.5 to 8 meters in height and width.

== Climate ==
The Sunset Apple is suited to temperate climates.

== Usage ==
The Sunset Apple is crisp and has an aromatic flavor. They may be kept for up to 2–3 weeks or eaten fresh.

== Disease resistance ==
The Sunset has some resistance to cankers and scabs. It has demonstrated toxicity to cats, dogs, and horses.

== Awards ==
The Sunset received an Award of Merit from the Royal Horticultural Society in 1960.

The Sunset Apple won the RHS AGM in 1993.
