= Friends (Joe Satriani composition) =

Single by Joe Satriani

from the album The Extremist
- B-side: "New Blues"
- Released: 1992
- Recorded: 1990–92
- Genre: Instrumental rock
- Length: 3:29
- Label: Relativity
- Songwriter(s): Joe Satriani
- Producer(s): Joe Satriani, Andy Johns

Joe Satriani singles chronology
"Flying in a Blue Dream" (1989)	"Friends" (1992)	"Summer Song" (1992)

"Friends" is a single by guitarist Joe Satriani, released in 1992 through Relativity Records. The single contains two instrumental tracks from his Grammy-nominated fourth studio album The Extremist, with "Friends" reaching No. 12 on the U.S. Billboard Mainstream Rock chart.

The chord progression of "Friends" generally follows an I–IV–V pattern (with the exception of the bridge sections) in the key of C♯ (occasionally D when played live), with heavy use of power chords in the accompaniment. Satriani performs the track using Drop D tuning down a half step and when performing the track live often uses a different guitar. In an interview for Guitar for the Practicing Musician, Satriani stated that he originally composed the song on bass guitar while looking through a book of photographs of smiling children.

== Track listing ==
All music is composed by Joe Satriani.

No.	Title	Length
1.	"Friends" (arrangement: Satriani, Andy Johns)	3:29
2.	"New Blues"	6:58
Total length:		10:27
