= Sunsets (poem) =

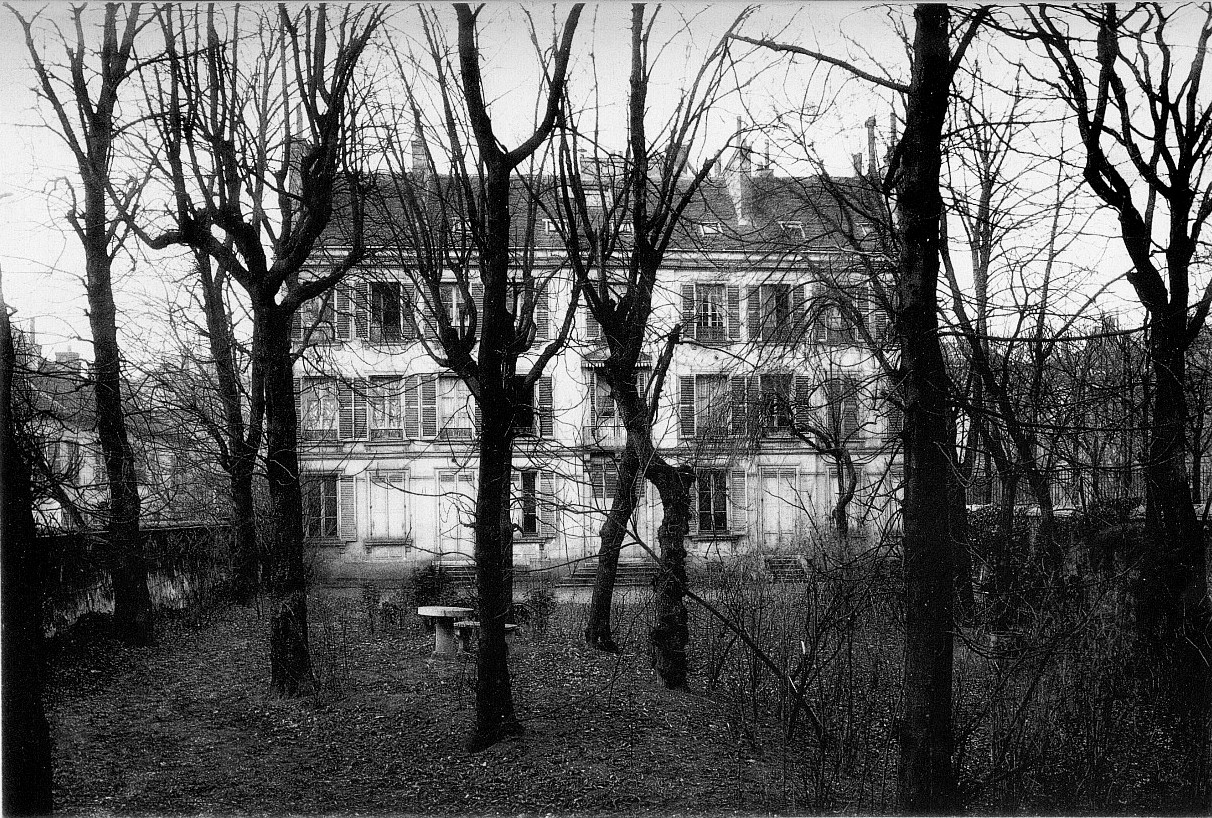
Victor Hugo's house on the Rue Notre-Dame-des-Champs, where he lived from 1827 to 1830.

Soleils couchants ("Sunsets", or "Setting Suns") is a set of six poems, or a six-part poem, by Victor Hugo. The poems were written individually and grouped together later. The first of the poems was written 1828, and grouped together in 1831 in the collection Les Feuilles d'automne. According to his wife, he was inspired to write the poems by his experiences of watching the sunsets at Vanves and Montrouge with two of his friends; after nightfall, they would retire to the Rue Notre-Dame-des-Champs, where they would urge him to recite the verses he had composed in his head while taking in the sights.
