= Sunset, Texas =

Sunset, Texas may refer to the following places in the U.S. state of Texas:

- Sunset, Montague County, Texas
- Sunset, Starr County, Texas
