= Surfing with the Alien (instrumental) =

Song by Joe Satriani

from the album Surfing with the Alien
- Released: 1987
- Recorded: 1986
- Genre: Instrumental rock
- Length: 4:25
- Label: Relativity
- Songwriter: Joe Satriani
- Producers: Joe Satriani, John Cuniberti

"Surfing with the Alien" is the title track from Surfing with the Alien, the second studio album by guitarist Joe Satriani, released in 1987 through Relativity Records.

The song was considered the 30th greatest guitar solo ever by readers of Guitar World magazine, and is one of Satriani's most prominent shred-style tracks. It is included as downloadable content in the "Guitar Virtuoso Track Pack" for the 2007 music video game, Guitar Hero III: Legends of Rock, and a downloadable single for the Rock Band game series.

Satriani made the melody one morning he went to record. He plugged a wah-wah pedal and a Tubedriver into his 100-watt Marshall, and decided to use an Eventide 949s. They recorded the song and solo in about half hour, but the Eventide broke down, and they couldn't recreate the original effect. They decided to leave the original version and make another one.
