= Mahachanok (mango) =

Mango cultivar

Mangifera 'Mahachanok'
- Genus: Mangifera
- Cultivar: 'Mahachanok'

The Mahachanok (or Maha Chanok) (Thai: มหาชนก) mango is a cultivar of mango grown primarily in Thailand. The Mahachanok is a hybrid cultivar of Sunset and Nang Klanwan, developed in Chiang Mai. It is also grown in Australia, where it has been grafted onto existing Kensington Pride trees.

The fruit of the Mahachanok mango tree is very elongated and curved, with a typical weight between 250 and 370 grams. It turns yellowish–orange with pink blush when ripe, and is one of the most popular varieties in Thailand for eating ripe (as opposed to green). The stone of the fruit is long and thin, so a high proportion of the fruit is flesh rather than stone, and the taste has been praised as highly desirable.

This variety of mango is popularly known as "Banana Mango" in Bangladesh, because of its banana-like shape.

== See also ==
- List of mango cultivars
