= Pitch axis theory =

Approach in music theory

Pitch axis theory refers to a way of thinking about chord progressions and modes that was heavily used and popularized (though not invented) by the guitarist Joe Satriani.

When composing using this concept, the pitch axis is simply a chosen note (a specific pitch), which is thought of as the tonic for a sequence of chords, which must all have this pitch as their root note. However, the other notes in each chord may be drawn from completely different keys. A mode (or any other scale) is chosen that fits with each chord, and also has the "pitch axis" as its root note. This sequence of scales is then used for creating a melody or improvising a solo.

The term "pitch axis theory" has been criticized as misleading, as the above techniques do not represent a separate theory of music, and simply refer to the application of scales — according to standard music theory — over the common technique of a pedal point chord progression. However, the approach has also been praised as a useful compositional tool and perspective, which encourages experimentation with frequent key shifts and movements between parallel scales.

== Examples ==
=== Simple Example ===
As a simple example, consider the following chord progression, which is non-diatonic (the chords are taken from multiple different keys), but all have root A.

| Amaj7(♯11)  | A7     | F/A | A7     |

In order to create a melody or improvise over this progression, we could use the following sequence of modes - which are different scales, but again, all have A as their root.

| A Lydian | A Mixolydian | A Aeolian | A Mixolydian |

In Satriani's terminology, this is a composition with a "pitch axis" of A

=== Joe Satriani: "Not of This Earth" ===
This progression has a pitch axis of E.

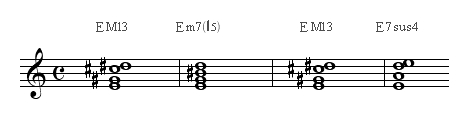
The chords from Joe Satriani's "Not of This Earth".

Satriani chooses E Lydian, E Aeolian, E Lydian, and E Mixolydian as the modes to use for each chord.

The First chord, EΔ13, contains the 1st, 3rd, 6th, and 7th degrees of the E major scale. A common choice here might have been the Ionian mode (major scale), but Satriani prefers the Lydian scale with its ♯4 - which is a perfectly acceptable choice as the chord itself does not specify ♮4 or ♯4.
The Second chord is a Em7b6 with no 5th, making the E Aeolian mode (E-F♯-G-A-B-C-D-E) a possible choice. However in the Context of coming/modulating from E Lydian, another option would be keeping the #4/b5 Bb note, implying a much more fitting "Aeolian b5" or "Locrian nat2" scale (aka Bayati Shuri/Kartzigar) which is the 6th mode of the Melodic Minor Scale.
The Third chord is a EMaj7add6 with no 5th, where similarly, and given the Context, E Lydian mode could be used.
The Fourth chord is a E7sus4 without a 3rd and 5th, where E Mixolydian mode could be used. Or again, Lydian Dominant if one wanted to preserve the #4/b5 note.
Ultimately a number of different scales/modes could be used in the entirety of the progression,
and it would be up to the personal taste/interpretation of the performer or composer to decide what would be a better fit, or which type of harmony to apply.

=== Dream Theater: "Lie" ===
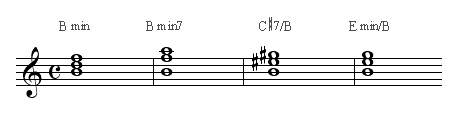
The chord progression from "Lie" by Dream Theater.

The transition to the guitar solo in Dream Theater's "Lie" is built on Pitch Axis Theory. The bass and guitar play the root (B) while the keyboardist implies the chords in the progression: B5, Bm7, Bm6, G/B, A/B.

Ignoring the root, the scales used for each of these four chords would be B Aeolian (natural minor), B Dorian, C♯ Mixolydian, and E Aeolian, respectively. However, from the perspective of pitch axis theory, we consider all scales to have the B root - so we would say that the progression is B Aeolian, B Dorian, B Lydian, and B Phrygian.

=== Joe Satriani: "Satch Boogie" ===
A more complex example is the bridge of "Satch Boogie", which still remains entirely in the "pitch axis" of A.

"Satch Boogie" bridge progression.

== Artists who use pitch axis theory ==
These artists use pitch axis theory and shifting modes in their music.

- Joe Satriani
- Dream Theater
- Marty Friedman
- Guthrie Govan
- Planet X
- Yngwie Malmsteen
- Greg Howe
- Meshuggah
- Steve Lukather
- Nick Johnston

== Related music theories ==
- Modal jazz
- George Russell's Lydian Chromatic Concept of Tonal Organization (1953)
- Polymodal chromaticism
- Pedal point
