= Joe Satriani (EP) =

EP by Joe Satriani
- Released: 1984
- Genre: Instrumental rock
- Length: 16:41
- Label: Rubina
- Producer: Joe Satriani

Joe Satriani chronology
| Joe Satriani (1984) | Not of This Earth (1986) |

Joe Satriani is a self-titled EP by guitarist Joe Satriani, released in 1984. Originally self-released in a limited run on vinyl only, the majority of the EP was later reissued on the first disc of Satriani's 1993 studio album, Time Machine, with the exception of "Talk to Me", which was not included due to its master tape having been damaged.

The EP only uses sounds made by an electric guitar, from tapping on the pickups for drums, to detuning the guitar for bass. The album was recorded in Jeff Holt's basement studio while Satriani was a guitar teacher in Berkeley, California and a member of a band called The Squares. The EP was reviewed by Guitar Player magazine, who had no knowledge that Satriani was ever in a typical band. The review, which treated Satriani as a purely instrumental guitarist, inspired him to pursue instrumental guitar playing as a career. However, the EP was not sufficient to secure a recording contract. Satriani used a credit card to finance his first full album, Not of This Earth, and used that finished album to secure a distribution contract with Relativity Records.

== Track listing ==
| No. | Title | Length |
|---|---|---|
| 1. | "Talk to Me" | 3:30 |
| 2. | "Dreaming Number Eleven" | 3:37 |
| 3. | "Banana Mango" | 2:44 |
| 4. | "I Am Become Death" | 3:56 |
| 5. | "Saying Good-Bye" | 2:54 |
| Total length: | | 16:41 |

== Personnel ==
- Joe Satriani – guitar, production
