= Alpha & Omega Recording =

Recording studio

- Founded: 1986
- Founder: Sandy Pearlman
- Genre: All
- Country of origin: U.S.
- Location: San Rafael, California

Alpha & Omega Recording is the San Rafael, California, recording studio of American music producer Sandy Pearlman.

Alpha & Omega Recording began in 1986, in Studio C at San Francisco's Hyde Street Studios, which Pearlman leased until 1991 from the studio's owner, Dan Alexander. It is now located at 150 Bellam Street in San Rafael, California. The studio offers 72-track analog recording facilities with a Trident 52-channel console and a Pro Tools digital system for recording, editing, and mixing.

Notable artists who have recorded or mixed sounds at Alpha & Omega include Blue Öyster Cult, Joe Satriani, Forbidden Evil, Angel Corpus Christi, World Entertainment War, Dysfunctional Family, Mystical Fullmoon, Exodus, Katharine Chase, Jennifer McKitrick, Digital Underground, John Hammond, the Obsessed, Todd Phillips, Vio-lence, Howard Wales, Patsy Moore, and Manapsara.
