= John Cuniberti =

American recording engineer and producer

John Cuniberti is an American recording engineer and producer.

== Career ==
John Cuniberti was the drummer for The Rockets in the early 1970s, the original band for Eddie Money. He later managed Hyde Street Studios, where he was the recording engineer for the early albums of the punk group Dead Kennedys. He also remastered several of these albums for re-release later in his career. His first recording sessions with the band took place in a converted mom-and-pop grocery store. He was also the engineer for albums by other early punk acts, such as Victims Family and Flipper.

Cuniberti co-produced Joe Satriani's debut album Not of This Earth, and in 1987 he then co-produced Satriani's sophomore album Surfing with the Alien, which was nominated for a Grammy Award and became a platinum-selling album. He has continued to partner with Satriani on future albums over his career. Starting in 1989, he produced albums for heavy metal band Xentrix, including their debut album Shattered Existence at Sinewave Studio in Birmingham and their second album For Whose Advantage? at Loco Studios in Wales. In 2007, he mastered the Mickey Hart and Global Drum Project album Global Drum Project, which received the Grammy Award for Best Contemporary World Music Album. In 2013, he produced the album Sammy Hagar and Friends, which features Sammy Hagar, Kid Rock, and members of bands including Heart, the Red Hot Chili Peppers, Santana, Van Halen, Journey, and Brooks & Dunn.

In 2018, Cuniberti produced Paul Gilbert's album Behold Electric Guitar. They connected through Cuniberti's OneMic Series, where Cuniberti produces tracks with musicians only using a single microphone. Other bands he has recorded as a part of the series include The Dozens, Jackie Greene, Essence, Boo Ray, and The Rubinoos. Other bands that Cuniberti has produced or engineered include PJ Harvey, Neville Brothers, Train, and Aerosmith.

== Reamp, recording studios, and mastering ==
Cuniberti invented the Reamp, which was the first commercially available reamping device. He has also created home recording studios for musicians including Sammy Hagar and the band Chickenfoot. Between 2000 and 2008, Cuniberti ran The Plant Mastering in San Francisco, which has mastered recordings for musicians such as Tracy Chapman, Thomas Dolby, and DJ Shadow. Cuniberti also designed the mastering studio himself. In 2008 he opened his own mastering studio Digital Therapy Lab in Oakland, California.
