= I Am a Wild Party (Live) =

Live album by Kim Mitchell
- Released: June 8, 1990
- Venues: Oshawa Civic Auditorium, Oshawa, Ontario; The KEE to Bala, Bala, Ontario
- Studios: Westbury Sound International, Toronto
- Genre: Rock
- Length: 38:29
- Label: Alert
- Producer: Kim Mitchell

Kim Mitchell chronology
| Rockland (1989) | I Am a Wild Party (Live) (1990) | Aural Fixations (1992) |

Singles from I Am a Wild Party
- 1. "I Am a Wild Party" Released: 1990

Professional ratings
Review scores
| Source | Rating |
|---|---|
| AllMusic | 2.5/5 stars |
| Collector's Guide to Heavy Metal | 7/10 |

I Am a Wild Party (Live) is a live album by Canadian musician Kim Mitchell and his fourth solo release. It contains six live tracks; five of which were performed at The Oshawa Civic Auditorium in Oshawa, Ontario, and "Go For Soda" performed at The KEE to Bala, on Lake Muskoka, in Bala, Ontario. The album also contains two new studio tracks titled "I Am a Wild Party" and "Deep Dive", recorded live at rehearsal.

== Commercial performance ==
I Am a Wild Party was the tenth-best selling Cancon album in Canada of 1990. The album was certified Platinum in Canada in 1991, and was just the third live album by a Canadian artist to sell more than 100,000 copies.

== Track listing ==
All songs by Kim Mitchell and Pye Dubois

1. "I Am a Wild Party" – 4:25 (new studio track)
2. "That's the Hold" – 5:05
3. "Battle Scar" – 5:54
4. "Lager & Ale" – 4:11
5. "Deep Dive" – 4:52 (new studio track)
6. "All We Are" – 5:41
7. "Rock n Roll Duty" – 4:17
8. "Go for Soda" – 3:59

== Personnel ==
Musicians

- Kim Mitchell – guitar, vocals, producer
- Peter Fredette – bass, vocals
- Greg Wells – keyboards
- Greg Critchley – drums (tracks 2–4, 6–7)
- Matt Frenette – drums (tracks 1, 5)
- Lou Molino – drums (track 8)

Production

- Doug McClement – live recordings engineer
- Bob Shindle – studio recordings engineer
- Mike Fraser – mixing at Little Mountain Sound Studios, Vancouver

== Resources ==
- http://www.kimmitchell.ca
