= Greatest Hits (Kim Mitchell album) =

Greatest hits album by Kim Mitchell
- Released: 1995
- Recorded: February 1995 (new recordings)
- Studio: Metalworks Studios, Mississauga, Ontario and Skylab Studios, Canada (new recordings)
- Genre: Rock
- Length: 66:05
- Label: Alert
- Producer: Kim Mitchell

Kim Mitchell chronology
Itch (1994)	Greatest Hits (1995)	Kimosabe (1999)

Professional ratings
Review scores
Source	Rating
AllMusic	4/5 stars
Collector's Guide to Heavy Metal	7/10

Greatest Hits is a compilation album from Canadian singer and guitarist Kim Mitchell. The album was released in 1995. The opening and closing tracks, "Transcendental Soda" and "Hare Soda", are instrumental intro and outro pieces, recorded live, with Mitchell playing the "Go for Soda" riff and the crowd responding.

== Track listings ==
=== Canadian Version ===
All songs by Kim Mitchell and Pye Dubois, except where indicated

1. "Transcendental Soda" – 0:46
2. "Rock N Roll Duty" – 3:42
3. "That's the Hold" – 3:59
4. "Go for Soda" – 3:25
5. "No More Walking Away" – 4:14 (new song)
6. "Lager & Ale" – 3:15 (new recording)
7. "Rocklandwonderland" – 4:27
8. "Easy to Tame" – 4:13
9. "Rainbow" (Mitchell, Andy Curran) – 4:15 (new song)
10. "All We Are" – 5:42
11. "Patio Lanterns" – 3:58 (new recording)
12. "Acrimony" – 3:55
13. "America" (Mitchell, Jim Chevalier) – 4:42
14. "Expedition Sailor" (The Other Version) – 4:28
15. "Lemon Wedge" – 5:33
16. "I Am a Wild Party" (live) – 4:26
17. "Hare Soda" – 1:05

=== US Version ===
1. "Transcendental Soda" – 0:46
2. "Rock N Roll Duty" – 3:42
3. "That's the Hold" – 3:59
4. "Go for Soda" – 3:25
5. "No More Walking Away" – 4:14 (new song)
6. "Lager & Ale" – 3:15 (new recording)
7. "Rocklandwonderland" – 4:27
8. "Easy to Tame" – 4:13
9. "Rainbow" – 4:15 (new song)
10. "All We Are" – 5:42
11. "Patio Lanterns" – 3:58 (new recording)
12. "Acrimony" – 3:55
13. "World's Such a Wonder" (Mitchell, Chevalier) – 4:56
14. "Expedition Sailor" (The Other Version) – 4:28
15. "Battle Scar" (live) – 5:33
16. "I Am a Wild Party" (live) – 4:26
17. "Hare Soda" – 1:05

== Personnel (new recordings) ==
- Mark Peters, Leanne Poole, Bob Shindle – engineers
- Rick Chycki – mixing
- George Graves, Scott Murley – remastering

== Resources ==
- http://www.kimmitchell.ca
