= Bala's Museum =

Coordinates: 45.0163°N 79.619°W

- Location: Bala, Ontario, Canada
- Type: Lucy Maud Montgomery,
- Director: Jack Hutton and Linda Hutton
- Website: Official website

Bala's Museum, officially with the sub-name "With Memories Of Lucy Maud Montgomery", is a museum located in Bala, Ontario, Canada. It is owned and operated by Jack Hutton and Linda Hutton.

The museum was formerly a boarding house operated by Fanny Pike at the beginnings of the 1900s and now houses artifacts from the Muskoka region from its founding by Thomas Burgess as well as those pertaining to Lucy Maud Montgomery, the author of the Anne of Green Gables series and The Blue Castle. It is the only museum of its kind outside of Prince Edward Island to do so. It sees visitors from around the world regularly, especially for the annual Anne of Green Gables Day, with re-enactments of Montgomery's two-week visit to the region in 1922.

== Origins ==
While on their honeymoon in Prince Edward Island, Linda and Jack Hutton discovered that Montgomery visited Bala for two weeks in 1922. The Tree Lawn Tourist Home, where Montgomery ate her meals while visiting the region, had been for sale for six years, and the couple bought the building to prevent its destruction. The couple opened a museum dedicated to Montgomery on July 24, 1992. It was the first museum to focus on Montgomery's life and her work in Ontario.

== Collections ==
The museum features dioramas depicting scenes from Montgomery's book Anne of Green Gables. The museum also displays a first-edition copy and foreign language translations of the Green Gables book. A copy of The Delineator from 1905, featuring a painting of Montgomery by George Gibbs, is also part of the museum's collection. This painting is used as the front cover illustration of various editions of the Green Gables book.

The museum's most expensive acquisition is the original sheet music from the 1919 Anne of Green Gables film. They bought the sheet music from eBay, discovering after the auction that they were bidding against the National Library of Canada. Although the film was destroyed, the museum has acquired film stills from the production of the movie.

The collection also includes items from Montgomery's life, including a silver tea set gifted to Montgomery for her 1911 wedding, a basket where the author kept her letters and excerpts from her diary during her visit to Bala.

== Historical designation ==
In 2013, the museum was designated as a historical site by the township of Muskoka Lakes.
