= Georgie Fab =

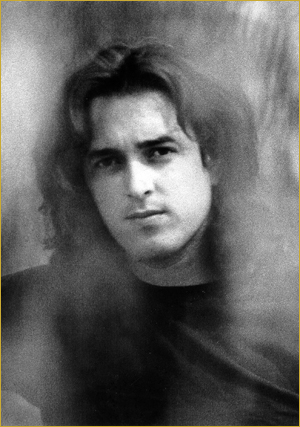

Background information
- Born: Robert George Johnston; 31 July 1952 (age 74); Hamilton, Ontario, Canada
- Genres: Progressive rock, pop rock, blues
- Occupations: Musician, singer-songwriter, composer, producer, arranger
- Instruments: Multi-instrumentalist
- Years active: 1970–present
- Website: Racerecords.ca

Georgie Fab (born Robert George Johnston, 31 July 1952 - 23 April 2023) was a Canadian rock musician, guitarist, singer songwriter, and producer.

In his recent work as a record producer, he has collaborated with Darcy Hepner ( of the band: Blood, Sweat and Tears), the King Biscuit Boy CD, "Biscuits 'n' Gravy", the Poison Arrows song "Puss n' Boots", and with Sylvain Sylvain of The New York Dolls. As well as over 20 other CDs, he most recently co-wrote and produced "Canadian Heroes" in dedication to the families of fallen members of the Canadian Armed Forces. Georgie's upcoming album, "The Terra Nye Experiment", is scheduled for release in late 2011 / early 2012.

== Personal life ==
Fab was born in St. Josephs Hospital, Hamilton, Ontario, to mother Nora Elizabeth (née Thorne) of Sydney, Nova Scotia, and father Kenneth Robert Johnston of Saskatoon, Saskatchewan. He is the brother of the now deceased sister Beverly Ann. Robert was educated at St. Bridget's and St. Margret Mary's Elementary Schools, and Barton and Hillpark Secondary Schools (where he met his wife, Irene Brown), Hamilton, Ontario. Robert completed his education at Mohawk College.

== Early career ==
At age 6, Fab began taking piano lessons, but it wasn't until age 14, when he picked up the guitar, that he first began performing in his band "The Canadian Museum" at local high schools and YMCA dances. He spent several years playing in a handful of bands before he became a founding member of "Buxton Kastle", his first major group. Signed to RCA Records in 1970 with bandmates Jerry Doucette, Jack Pedler, and David Kastle, the group scored a major hit with the single "Kagie", hitting No. 2 on the Canadian Adult Contemporary chart RPM in 1971.

== Post-Buxton Kastle Career ==
When Doucette left the group later in 1971, Georgie switched from Hammond CV Organ to guitar. The band then changed labels from RCA to Reprise Records, and then Warner Bros where they again hit the charts with the single "Red Red The Rocking Horse", "Shorty McKenna", "Lovin Games", and "Love is Life". It was during this period that Georgie was thrust into the spotlight, appearing on Canadian TV shows such as "Canadian Bandstand", "Musical Friends", and "Like Young", a national musical TV show out of Montreal.

Soon following the break up of Buxton Kastle, Georgie began his relationship with Skip Prokop, founding member of the Juno award-winning rock orchestra Lighthouse. As well as contributing material to the Lighthouse project, he and Skip co-wrote the No. 1 hit "It Just Occurred To Me" for A&M Records artist Peter Pringle. The song remained at No. 1 for the weeks of 2 and 9 May 1981, and earned a BMI award for one of the top ten most played records of the year, and garnered a Gold Record for Pringle. This in turn led to Georgie being approached by Atlantic Records Chairman of the Board, in order to collaborate with Juno Award winner, Kim Mitchell, to write material for his first LP, Akimbo Alogo. The record went platinum and the co-writing efforts produced the Top 40 hit, "Feel It Burn", the "Go For Soda" B-side entitled "Caroline" with Pye Dubois, and the No. 1 song, "All We Are." Georgie Fab wrote the uncredited lyric hook, "...you make me feel such a long way away..."

Besides being a musician, Georgie Fab was also a record producer and co-founder of the record company "Race Records", as well as the recording studio "A cellar full of noise"

== Discography ==
=== Singles ===
| Year | Title | Canadian Chart |
|---|---|---|
| 1971 | Kagie | 2 |
| 1971 | Riverside Girl | |
| 1972 | "Red Red (The Rocking Horse)" | 67 |
| 1972 | "Shorty McKenna" | 52 |
| 1972 | "Lovin Games" | |
| 1972 | "Love is Life" | |

=== Albums ===
| Year | Title |
|---|---|
| 2007 | Georgie Fab, Dan Clancy |
| 2009 | Clown School |
| 2011 | Just Fab |
| 2011 | The Terra Nye Experiment |

=== Production credits ===
- Black is Black - Cara Mia (Yesterday) (1981)
- 40-Years of Rock & Roll (Sonny Del-Rio) (1999)
- All I got is the blues (Sonny Del-Rio) (1999)
- Ronnie & The Rockets (Ronnie & The Rockets) (1999)
- Skip Prokop's Valecrest (Skip Prokop) (2002)
- D.T. Delinquent (Jack Pedler) (2003)
- Always (Fred MacNeil) (2003)
- Easy with Those Cuffs (Superchargers) (2004)
- Hamilton Hometown Christmas (Various) (2004)
- Homeward (Glenn Higgins) (2005)
- Maritime Pride (MacNeil Brothers) (2006)
- Let's get Nervous (Jack Pedler) (2007)
- The Key to Life is Love (Mike Chiarot) (2007)
- Clown School (Clown School) (2007)
- Welcome to Saxland (Sonny Del-Rio) (2007)
- While Angels Sing (St Patrick Folk Group) (2007)
- Hamilton Tiger Cats Fight Song (Various) (2007)
- Colour Games (Jason Simpson) (2008)
- From a Victim Consciousness (Robert E. Denton) (2008)
- Georgie Fab / Dan Clancy (Georgie Fab & Dan Clancy) (2008
- Canadian Heroes (Various) (2010)
- The Terra Nye Experiment (The Terra Nye Experiment) (2011)
- Just Fab (Georgie Fab) (2011)
- Mark Campbell (Mark Campbell) (2011)
- Meat Jack Pedler Clown School (Clown School) (2011)
- Waste - (Nicky Monté) (2012)

== Participating acts ==
- It just occurred to me (Peter Pringle) (1981) No. 1 Canadian Chart
- Feel it burn (Kim Mitchell) (1983)
- Caroline (Kim Mitchell) (1983)
- All we are (Kim Mitchell) (1983) (unaccredited lyrics)
- Fifty to life (Lighthouse) (1996)
- Treat your baby right (Sonny Del-Rio) (1999)
- A Friend like you (Sonny Del-Rio) (1999)
- Guilty (Sonny Del-Rio) (1999)
- 7th Ave Blues (Sonny Del-Rio) (1999)
- Jail House Blues (Sonny Del-Rio) (1999)
- Jail House Blues (Dan Clancy) (1999)
- Birthday Suit (Sonny Del-Rio) (1999)
- I don't want to break your heart (2001) Dan Clancy
- Tender Touch (Dan Clancy) (2001)
- It feels just like heaven (Skip Prokop) (2002) Skip Prokop's Valecrest
- Jamie (Skip Prokop) (2002) Skip Prokop's Valecrest
- Mr McKay (Skip Prokop) (2002) Skip Prokop's Valecrest
- Two Hound Blues (King Biscuit Boy) (2004) King Biscuit Boy and Sonny Del-Rio
- A Taste of Heaven (Glenn Higgins) (2005)
- Strollin (Glenn Higgins) (2005)
- Getting Laid and Drinking Wine (2007) Sonny Del-Rio
- Terrible Times (Sonny Del-Rio) (2007)
- Welcome to Saxland (Sonny Del-Rio) (2008)
- Who is right Who is wrong (2009) Jason Simpson
- Turn the Radio On (Skip Prokop) (2011)
