= America (Kim Mitchell song) =

Single by Kim Mitchell

from the album Aural Fixations
- Released: May 1992
- Genre: Rock
- Length: 4:27
- Label: Alert
- Songwriters: Kim Mitchell; Jim Chevalier
- Producers: Kim Mitchell; John Webster

Kim Mitchell singles chronology
"Find the Will" (1992)	"America" (1992)	"World's Such a Wonder" (1992)

"America" is a song by Canadian rock musician Kim Mitchell. It was released May 1992 as the second single from his fourth studio album, Aural Fixations. It was Mitchell's highest-charting single in Canada, reaching number 3 on the RPM Top Singles chart.

A music video was made for the song. However, it seems to be lost, not even being available on YouTube.

== Charts ==
Chart (1992)	Peak position
Canada Top Singles (RPM)	3
