= Kim Mitchell (album) =

EP by Kim Mitchell
- Released: November 1982
- Recorded: 1982
- Studio: Quest Studios, Oshawa, Ontario, Canada
- Genre: Rock
- Length: 18:41
- Label: Anthem
- Producer: Kim Mitchell, Jack Richardson

Kim Mitchell chronology
| Kim Mitchell (1982) | Akimbo Alogo (1984) |

Professional ratings
Review scores
| Source | Rating |
|---|---|
| AllMusic | 4/5 stars |
| Collector's Guide to Heavy Metal | 10/10 |

Kim Mitchell is the first solo effort from Canadian singer and guitarist Kim Mitchell. Mitchell was the former lead singer and guitarist for Max Webster. This extended play was recorded and released a year after Max Webster broke up

== Track listing ==
All songs written by Kim Mitchell and Pye Dubois.

1. "Kids in Action" – 4:30
2. "Miss Demeanor" – 3:39
3. "Big Best Summer" – 3:36
4. "Tennessee Water" – 3:42
5. "Chain of Events" – 3:14

== Personnel ==
- Kim Mitchell – guitar, lead vocals, producer

Musicians

- Robert Sinclair Wilson – bass guitar, vocals
- Paul DeLong – drums
- Peter Fredette, Bernie LaBarge – background vocals

Production

- Jack Richardson – producer
- Paul LaChapelle – engineer
- Mike Tilka, Tom Berry – executive producers
