= Shakin' Like a Human Being =

Studio album by Kim Mitchell
- Released: June 13, 1986
- Studio: Le Studio, Morin-Heights, Quebec
- Genre: Rock
- Length: 39:59
- Label: Alert (Canada); Atlantic (US)
- Producer: Kim Mitchell

Kim Mitchell chronology
Akimbo Alogo (1984)	Shakin' Like a Human Being (1986)	Rockland (1989)

Singles from Shakin' Like a Human Being
- 1. "Patio Lanterns" Released: 1986; 2. "Alana Loves Me" Released: 1986; 3. "Easy to Tame" Released: 1986; 4. "In Your Arms" Released: 1986

Professional ratings
Review scores
Source	Rating
AllMusic	3/5 stars
Collector's Guide to Heavy Metal	9/10

Shakin' Like a Human Being is the second solo album by Canadian rock musician Kim Mitchell, released in 1986. This album was released in Canada on Alert Records and on Atlantic Records in the US. The album won the Juno Award for Album of the Year in 1987. It features the hit single "Patio Lanterns".

The title of the album came from a repeated lyric in Mitchell's song "I Am a Wild Party", which Mitchell included in his live performances but was not released until the I Am a Wild Party (Live) album came out.

== Commercial performance ==
Shakin' Like a Human Being sold more than 50,000 copies within a week of its release. The album sold 300,000 copies in Canada and was certified triple platinum in the country, making it Mitchell's most successful album to date.

== Track listing ==
All songs written by Kim Mitchell and Pye Dubois, unless otherwise shown.

Side one

1. "Get Lucky (Boys & Girls)" – 4:04
2. "In My Shoes" – 3:34
3. "Alana Loves Me" – 4:08
4. "Patio Lanterns" – 3:24
5. "That's the Hold" – 3:59

Side two

1. "In Your Arms" (Mitchell, Dubois, Todd Booth) – 4:08
2. "City Girl" – 4:04
3. "Easy to Tame" – 4:12
4. "Cameo Spirit" – 3:32
5. "Hitting the Ground" – 4:54

== Personnel ==
Band members

- Kim Mitchell – lead guitar, vocals, producer
- Peter Fredette – rhythm guitar, keyboards, vocals
- Robert Sinclair Wilson – bass, keyboards, vocals
- Paul Delong – drums
- Pye Dubois – lyrics

Additional musicians

- Todd Booth – keyboards and arranging
- Floyd Bell, Steve Hollingworth – additional vocals

Production

- Paul Northfield – engineer, mixing
- Frank Opoloko, Robert Di Gioia – assistant engineers
- Bob Ludwig – mastering at Masterdisk, New York
- Hugh Syme – cover design
- Dimo Safari – photography
- Tom Berry – executive producer
