= Dream thieves =

Dream thieves may refer to:

- The Dream Thieves, the second novel of The Raven Cycle by author Maggie Stiefvater
- "Dreamthieves", a song by Kim Mitchell from his 2007 album Ain't Life Amazing
- "The Dreamthieves", a song by the Sword from their 2015 album High Country
