= Wahta Mohawks =

Wahta Mohawk Territory
- Indian reserve
- Wahta Mohawk Territory Indian Reserve
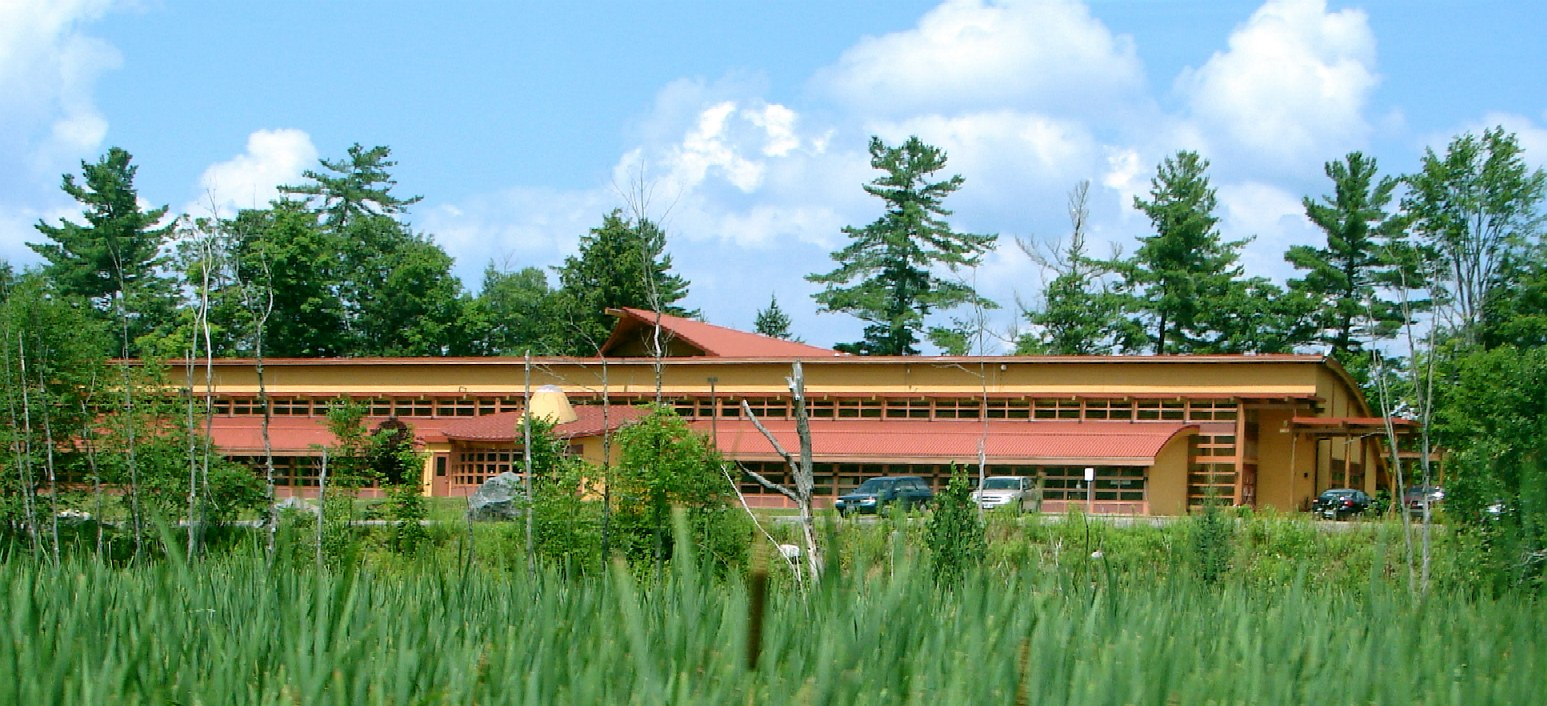

- Location within Southern Ontario
- Coordinates: 45°01′N 79°44′W
- Country: Canada
- Province: Ontario
- District municipality: Muskoka
- First Nation: Wahta Mohawks

Area
  - Land: 61.17 km^{2} (23.62 sq mi)

Population (2018)
  - Total: 156
- Website: www.wahtamohawks.com

Wahta Mohawks (Mohawk: Wáhtahró:non) is a Mohawk First Nation in Ontario. The Wahta Mohawk Territory (Mohawk: Wáhta) is their territory (reserve) in the District Municipality of Muskoka, Ontario, Canada near Bala. It is bounded on the west by Highway 400, a major north–south artery in the province. About one-third of the 831 citizens of Wahta Mohawk Territory live in the community of Wahta, along District Road 38, another third live within 100 km, and the remainder live elsewhere.

The land is made up of forest and lakes typical of the rugged Canadian Shield. It is used primarily for hunting and fishing by Mohawk from the reserves of Kanesatake and Kahnawake Quebec, who share access to this territory. It was the site of the now-defunct Iroquois Cranberry Growers, which was Ontario's largest cranberry farm. The farm was shut down in 2017 due to economic reasons. "Wáhta" is the Mohawk term for the Maple festival, one of their important ceremonies.

Wahta Mohawk Territory was founded in 1881 after the Sulpician Order bought land here for Mohawk from the community of Kanesatake, Quebec, where there had been political and religious strife over land use rights. About one-fifth of the Mohawk from that community moved to the new area.

They also share the Indian River Indian Reserve with the Chippewas of Rama First Nation.

In October 2023, in conjunction with Muskoka District council and the province, District Road 38, which had been formerly known only by its district road number and had no official name apart from that, was given the new name Kanien’kehá:ka Iohatátie, meaning "Mohawk People Road" in the Mohawk language.

== "Wahta Gap" ==
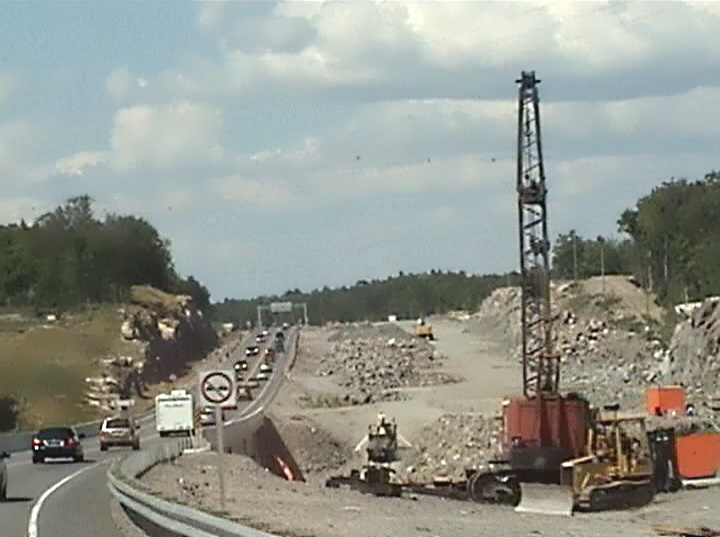
Twinning through the "Wahta Gap" in 2007

For a number of years a Mohawk land claim dispute with the provincial government prevented completion of Highway 400 through Wahta. Consequently, through the late 1990s and early 2000s there was an eight-kilometre gap in the freeway, where the roadway remained a two-lane highway for several years even after construction of the freeway was completed further north; although an agreement in principle was reached between the provincial government and the band council by 2001, construction was further delayed by the inability to reach quorum in a band referendum on the agreement: although two separate votes in 2002 were both solidly in favour of the agreement, neither was legally implementable because overall voter participation fell short of the required minimum of 198 voters both times.

In 2003 the government and the Mohawk First Nation reached an agreement allowing freeway construction through the reserve lands. Begun in 2004, construction was completed in 2008.

== Demographics ==
As of March, 2018:

- Population: 156
- Area (km^{2}.): 61.17
- Density (persons per km^{2}.): 2.55

Out of the total 831 Wahta Mohawks, 675 live off-reserve.

== See also ==
- Iroquois Cranberry Growers
