= Fill Your Head with Rock (Kim Mitchell album) =

Greatest hits album by Kim Mitchell
- Released: 2005
- Genre: Rock
- Label: Sweden Rock

Kim Mitchell chronology
Kimosabe (1999)	Fill Your Head with Rock (2005)	Ain't Life Amazing (2007)

Fill Your Head with Rock is a 2005 compilation album from Canadian singer and guitarist Kim Mitchell.

== Track listing ==
1. "Rock N Roll Duty" - 3:45
2. "Monkey Shine" - 4:39
3. "Big Smoke" - 6:11
4. "Wonder Where and Why" - 3:46
5. "Stickin' My Heart" - 4:45
6. "Fill Your Head With Rock" - 5:29
7. "Lick Yer Finger" - 4:03
8. "Lager & Ale" - 4:06
9. "Human Condition" - 5:19
10. "World's Such a Wonder" - 4:59
11. "Kimosabe" - 3:57
12. "Get Lucky (Boys & Girls)" - 4:06
13. "Skinny Buddah" - 6:22
14. "Find The Will" - 4:55
15. "Go For Soda" - 3:27
16. "I Am A Wild Party" - 4:28
- This compilation was only released in Europe

== DVD Live Concert ==
1. "That's the hold"
2. "Rocklandwonderland"
3. "The Crossroads"
4. "Lost Lovers Found"
5. "Battlescar"
6. "All We Are"
7. "That's A Man"
8. "O Mercy Louise"
9. "Easy to Tame"
10. "Patio Lanterns"
11. "Go For Soda"
12. "Rock'N'Roll Duty"

This live performance was part of a live series from Canadian music station Much Music to showcase new material from the 1989 double platinum selling album "Rockland" by Kim Mitchell The band featured in this performance is Kim Mitchell guitar and lead vocals, Peter Fredette bass and vocals, Greg Wells keyboards and Lou Molino drums
