= Iroquois Cranberry Growers =

Indigenous cranberry farm

Iroquois Cranberry Growers (ICG) was a cranberry farm owned and operated by the Wahta Mohawks on their territory near Bala, Ontario. The project was started in 1969 as an economic development venture with 0.5 acres (0.20 ha) acre of cranberries and grew to 68 acres (28 ha). It provided employment for community members and has helped to support an economic base for community government.

The Wahta Mohawks moved to Wahta Mohawk Territory in 1881 from Oka, Quebec, and traditionally picked and sold cranberries from a bog just north of the Musquash river. That same spot had all the requirements for a commercial cranberry operation. A good supply of water, impermeable peat soils, and an abundant supply of sand comes together at the site. The Wahta Mohawks brought Orville Johnston, founder of the nearby Johnston's Cranberry Marsh farm (now Muskoka Lakes Farm and Winery), on as a consultant.

This facility closed in 2017 due to a glut in the market.
