= The Big Fantasize (Kim Mitchell album) =

Studio album by Kim Mitchell
- Released: June 26, 2020
- Genre: Rock
- Label: El Mocambo Records

Kim Mitchell chronology
| Ain't Life Amazing (2007) | The Big Fantasize (2020) |

The Big Fantasize is the ninth album from Canadian singer and guitarist Kim Mitchell and first in 13 years since 2007's Ain't Life Amazing. "Wishes," the first single from the album, was issued the same date the album was released. The album includes nine original songs and four live tracks including the Max Webster classic, "Paradise Skies". The studio tracks were recorded in Los Angeles and Toronto.

== Track listing ==
1. "Red Horizon" - 3:55
2. "2UP2Bdown" - 3:54
3. "Summer Lovers Autumn Wine" - 5:12
4. "Wishes" - 4:06
5. "Georgian Bay" - 4:12
6. "Best I Never Had" - 5:12
7. "Montgomery" - 5:00
8. "Old Marriage Waltz" - 4:00
9. "Time To Stay" - 4:35
10. "Lager and Ale" (live) - 4:12
11. "Rocklandwonderland" (live) - 6:17
12. "Paradise Skies" (live) - 4:50
13. "All We Are" (live) - 8:14

== Credits ==
Produced and mixed by Greg Wells

== Personnel on live tracks ==
- Kim Mitchell – guitars, vocals
- Peter Fredette – bass, backing vocals
- Dave Langguth – drums
- Sam Pomanti – keyboards
