= Kimosabe (album) =

Studio album by Kim Mitchell
- Released: 1999
- Studio: Phase One Studios, Toronto, Metalworks Studios, Mississauga and home studio
- Genre: Rock
- Length: 46:36
- Label: Chinook/Oasis
- Producer: Kim Mitchell

Kim Mitchell chronology
Greatest Hits (1995)	Kimosabe (1999)	Fill Your Head with Rock (2005)

Professional ratings
Review scores
Source	Rating
Collector's Guide to Heavy Metal	5/10

Kimosabe is the seventh album from Canadian singer and guitarist Kim Mitchell. The album was released in 1999.

== Track listing ==
All songs written by Kim Mitchell and Andy Curran, except where noted

1. "Monkey Shine" – 4:37
2. "Stickin My Heart" – 4:44
3. "Cellophane" – 4:08
4. "Two Steps Home" (Mitchell, Ringgenberg) – 4:51
5. "Kimosabe" – 3:56
6. "Blow Me a Kiss" – 4:28
7. "Cold Reality" (Mitchell) – 4:31
8. "Over Me" (Mitchell) – 4:04
9. "Get Back What's Gone" – 4:56
10. "Skinny Buddah" – 6:21

== Personnel ==
Musicians

- Kim Mitchell – guitars, vocals, producer, engineer
- Gary Breit – organ, piano, keyboards, vocals
- Peter Fredette – bass, vocals
- Randy Cooke – drums, percussion

Additional musicians

- Carlos del Junco – harmonica
- Dalbello – vocals
- Andy Curran – vocals

Production

- Graham Brewer, Scott Lake – engineers
- Vic Florencia – mixing
- Nick Blagona – mastering at Metalworks
- George Graves – additional editing at The Lacquer Channel
- W. Tom Berry – management
- Rob Waymen – photography
- Patrick Duffy – art direction and design

== See also ==
- Ke-mo sah-bee
