= Patio Lanterns =

Single by Kim Mitchell

from the album Shakin' Like a Human Being
- Released: June 1986
- Studio: Le Studio (Morin-Heights, Quebec)
- Genre: Rock
- Length: 3:28
- Label: Alert
- Songwriters: Kim Mitchell; Pye Dubois
- Producer: Kim Mitchell

Kim Mitchell singles chronology
"All We Are" (1984)	"Patio Lanterns" (1986)	"Alana Loves Me" (1986)

"Patio Lanterns" is a song by Canadian rock musician Kim Mitchell that was first released as a single in June 1986 and later appeared in the 1986 album Shakin' Like a Human Being. An acoustic recording of the song was released as a single in 1995 and also included in the album Greatest Hits released the same year. By 1996, the song had been broadcast on Canadian radio stations more than 100,000 times. The song was described by the CBC as "quintessentially Canadian".

== Background ==
Partially written by Mitchell while driving around Toronto in his van, it almost was left off the album.

== Critical reception ==
The song was reviewed by Billboard in the 21 June 1986 issue, and was described as "contorted imagery presented in a Jackson Browne soundalike manner". In 2008, Lynn Peppas of the Welland Tribune stated that "Patio Lanterns" and other Mitchell songs ("Go for Soda", "All We Are", and "Rock 'n' Roll Duty") are "timeless summer rock anthems".

In the article Across the Great Divide, author Barry Grant states that Canadian rock and roll differentiates itself from American rock and roll by its use of ironic subversiveness applied to the pop culture American genre. Jeannette Sloniowski and Joan Nicks state that "Patio Lanterns" fit that model, one of the few songs by popular Canadian rock musicians to do so. (They argue that most Canadian rock ironists are cult figures, not popular ones.)

== Music video ==
The music video created for the song has been described as "a lighthearted piece". It includes concert footage commingled with "conceptual sequences centering on a summer patio party". It was directed by Stephen Reynolds, produced by Allan Weinrib, and edited by Chris Cooper.

== Chart performance ==
The song debuted on Billboard's album rock tracks on 26 July 1986 at position 50. It peaked at position 36 for two weeks, and remained on the Billboard album rock tracks chart for six weeks. For the week ending 14 August 1986, the song had reached #20 on The Record charts in Canada.

=== Peak positions ===
Chart (1986)	Peak position
Canada Adult Contemporary (RPM)	13
Canada Top Singles (RPM)	12
US Billboard Top Rock Tracks	36
