= Akimbo Alogo =

Studio album by Kim Mitchell
- Released: June 28, 1984
- Studios: McClear Place, Toronto, Canada
- Genre: Rock
- Length: 41:42
- Labels: Alert (Canada); Bronze (International)
- Producers: Kim Mitchell, Nick Blagona

Kim Mitchell chronology
Kim Mitchell (1982)	Akimbo Alogo (1984)	Shakin' Like a Human Being (1986)

Singles from Akimbo Alogo
- 1. "Go for Soda" Released: 1984; 2. "All We Are" Released: 1984; 3. "Feel It Burn" Released: 1985; 4. "Lager & Ale" Released: 1985

Alternative cover
- Second cover art

Professional ratings
Review scores
Source	Rating
AllMusic	4/5 stars
Collector's Guide to Heavy Metal	10/10

Akimbo Alogo is the debut solo studio album by Canadian rock musician Kim Mitchell, released on Alert Records in Canada, and on Bronze Records in other territories, including the United States, United Kingdom, Europe, and Japan. The album includes Mitchell's only significant solo hit in the United States, "Go for Soda", a song which has been adopted as an anthem against drunk driving. "All We Are", "Feel it Burn" and "Lager & Ale" also received significant airplay in Canada at the time of the album's release and receive airplay on classic rock radio to this day.The album was certified platinum in Canada for sales of over 100,000 albums sold.

== Cover art ==
The album used different cover art for its release in the United States in 1985. For the UK, Japanese, and European releases of this album, the cover art was altered again due to the cigarette pictured in Mitchell's mouth.

== Commercial performance ==
Akimbo Alogo was certified Platinum in Canada.

== Track listing ==
All songs written by Kim Mitchell and Pye Dubois, unless otherwise indicated.

Side one

1. "Go for Soda" – 3:28
2. "That's a Man" – 3:47
3. "All We Are" – 4:45
4. "Diary for Rock 'n' Roll Men" – 4:14
5. "Love Ties" – 4:18

Side two

1. "Feel It Burn" (Kim Mitchell, Bob Johnson) – 4:14
2. "Lager & Ale" – 4:05
3. "Rumour Has It" – 4:09
4. "Caroline" (Mitchell, Johnson, Dubois) – 3:40
5. "Called Off" – 4:57

== Personnel ==
- Kim Mitchell – lead guitar, lead vocals, arrangements, producer
- Peter Fredette – rhythm guitar, keyboards, lead vocals (on choruses of "All We Are"), backing vocals
- Robert Sinclair Wilson – bass, keyboards, backing vocals
- Paul Delong – drums
- Todd Booth – keyboards and lead synthesiser, arrangements
- Pye Dubois – lyrics, backing vocals

Production

- Nick Blagona – producer, engineer
- Joe Finlan, Robin Short – assistant engineers
- George Marino – mastering at Sterling Sound, New York
- Tom Berry – executive producer
