= Indian River (reserve) =

- Indian reserve
- Indian River Indian Reserve
- Location within Southern Ontario
- Coordinates: 45°07′N 79°34′W
- Country: Canada
- Province: Ontario
- District municipality: Muskoka
- First Nation: Chippewas of Rama, Wahta Mohawks

Area
  - Land: 0.01 km^{2} (0.0039 sq mi)

Indian River is a First Nations reserve on Lake Rosseau surrounded by Muskoka Lakes and close to the unincorporated community of Port Carling, Ontario. It is shared between the Chippewas of Rama First Nation and the Wahta Mohawks.
