= Rockland (Kim Mitchell album) =

Studio album by Kim Mitchell
- Released: June 27, 1989
- Studios: Various: One on One Studios, North Hollywood; Southcombe Studio, Burbank, California; Quest Studios, Oshawa, Ontario; McClear Place, Toronto, Canada
- Genre: Rock
- Length: 46:27
- Labels: Alert (Canada); Atlantic (US)
- Producer: Kim Mitchell

Kim Mitchell chronology
Shakin' Like a Human Being (1986)	Rockland (1989)	I Am A Wild Party (Live) (1990)

Singles from Rockland
- 1. "Rock n Roll Duty" Released: 1989; 2. "Rocklandwonderland" Released: 1989; 3. "Expedition Sailor" Released: 1989

Professional ratings
Review scores
Source	Rating
Collector's Guide to Heavy Metal	4/10

Rockland is the third solo album by Canadian rock musician Kim Mitchell, released in 1989. The album was the fourth-best selling Cancon album in Canada of 1989. "Rock n Roll Duty" was the second-most played Cancon song in Canada of 1989, while "Rocklandwonderland" was the ninth-most played Cancon song in Canada that year. The album was certified double platinum in Canada. Rockland was released internationally on the Atlantic Records label.

== Track listing ==
All songs by Kim Mitchell and Pye Dubois, except "The Great Embrace" by Mitchell, Dubois and Todd Booth

1. "Rocklandwonderland" – 4:19
2. "Lost Lovers Found"– 5:07
3. "Rock n Roll Duty" – 3:20
4. "Tangle of Love" – 4:45
5. "Moodstreet" – 4:23
6. "The Crossroads" – 4:25
7. "Expedition Sailor" – 4:25
8. "O Mercy Louise" – 3:58
9. "This Dream" – 4:33
10. "The Great Embrace" – 5:29

== Personnel ==
Credits taken from album booklet.

Musicians

- Kim Mitchell – lead guitar, vocals
- Greg Wells – keyboards, backing vocals
- Kim Bullard – keyboards
- Matthew Gerrard – bass
- Lou Molino – drums
- Peter Fredette, Floyd Bell – backing vocals
- Pat Mastelotto – programming
- Pye Dubois – lyrics

Additional musicians

- Rik Emmett – acoustic guitar in "Expedition Sailor"
- Sheree Jeacocke – backing vocals on "Moodstreet"

Production

- Paul DeVilliers, Paul La Chapelle, Phil Kaffel – engineers
- Brian Foraker, Noel Golden – mixing at Metalworks Studios, Mississauga
- Greg Fulginiti – mastering at Artisan Sound Recorders
- Hugh Syme – art direction and design
- Dimo Safari – photography
- W. Tom Berry – executive producer

== Resources ==
- http://www.kimmitchell.ca
