= Itch (album) =

Studio album by Kim Mitchell
- Released: 1994
- Studio: Reaction Studios, Toronto, Canada; Ardent Studios, Memphis, Tennessee
- Genre: Rock
- Length: 50:53
- Label: Alert (Canada); Fresh Fruit/SPV (Europe)
- Producer: Joe Hardy

Kim Mitchell chronology
Aural Fixations (1992)	Itch (1994)	Greatest Hits (1995)

Professional ratings
Review scores
Source	Rating
AllMusic	4/5 stars
Collector's Guide to Heavy Metal	8/10

Itch is the sixth album from Canadian singer and guitarist Kim Mitchell. The album was released in 1994. This would be the last album to date that Mitchell would collaborate with lyricist Pye Dubois. Dubois didn't contribute any lyrics to Mitchell's previous album Aural Fixations, released two years before this album.

== Track listing ==
All songs by Kim Mitchell, Pye Dubois, except "Karaoke Queen" by Mitchell, Dubois and Lou Pomanti

1. "Wonder Where and Why" – 3:46
2. "Acrimony" – 3:35
3. "Lick Yer Finger" – 4:01
4. "The U.S. of Ache" – 5:38
5. "Lemon Wedge" – 5:33
6. "Heartbreakbustop" – 4:57
7. "Your Face or Mine" – 4:41
8. "Human Condition" – 5:16
9. "Stand" – 4:31
10. "Karaoke Queen" – 4:22
11. "Cheer Us On" – 4:27
12. "Beachtown" – 4:49 (European version bonus track)

== Personnel ==
Musicians

- Kim Mitchell – guitar, vocals, arrangements
- Spider Sinnaeve – bass
- Greg Morrow – drums and percussion
- Lou Pomanti – keyboards
- Peter Fredette, William C. Brown III, Bertram Brown – background vocals
- Scott Thompson – trumpet
- Jim Spake – saxophone
- Pye Dubois – lyrics

Production

- Joe Hardy – producer, engineer, mixing, arrangements
- Todd Booth – arrangements
- Tom Heron, Jeff Elliott, Erik Flettrich – assistant engineers
- Scott Murley – digital sequencing and editing
- George Marino – mastering at Sterling Sound, New York
- W. Tom Berry – executive producer, management
