= Go for Soda =

Single by Kim Mitchell

from the album Akimbo Alogo
- Released: 1984
- Recorded: McClear Place, Toronto
- Genre: Rock
- Length: 3:25
- Label: Alert, Bronze
- Songwriters: Kim Mitchell, Pye Dubois
- Producers: Kim Mitchell, Nick Blagona

Kim Mitchell singles chronology
"Miss Demeanor" (1982)	"Go for Soda" (1984)	"All We Are" (1984)

Music video
- "Go for Soda" on YouTube

"Go for Soda" is a song by Canadian singer Kim Mitchell. Mitchell wrote the music for the song himself, while the lyrics were written by Pye Dubois. The song's narrator, frustrated at his contentious relationship with his lover, opts to relax and forget about his troubles with a soda. "Go for Soda" was released in 1984 as the lead single from Mitchell's first full-length solo album, Akimbo Alogo. The song reached number 22 in Canada; it was Mitchell's only charting single on the Billboard Hot 100 in the United States, reaching number 86. It remains his best-known song outside of his native Canada.

== In popular culture ==
"Go for Soda" served as the campaign theme for Mothers Against Drunk Driving (MADD) in the United States. Mitchell has said that though the song was not intended to be about drinking and driving, he was happy to have MADD adopt it for that use.

== Music video ==
The music video was directed by Robert Bouvier. It depicts a doll-sized Kim Mitchell hopping out of a television set, mystifying the teenaged boy watching it as he proceeds to dance and teleport around the house. He eventually opens the refrigerator to find Mitchell and the song's other instrumentalists performing inside, all of them doll-sized, before they transform into unbranded cans of soda. The teenage boy goes to his friend and suggests they get a soda, without saying a word about his experience.

== Charts ==
Chart (1984–1985)	Peak position
Canada Top Singles (RPM)	22
US Billboard Hot 100	86
US Billboard Mainstream Rock Tracks	12
