= Bala, Ontario =

Bala
- Compact rural community
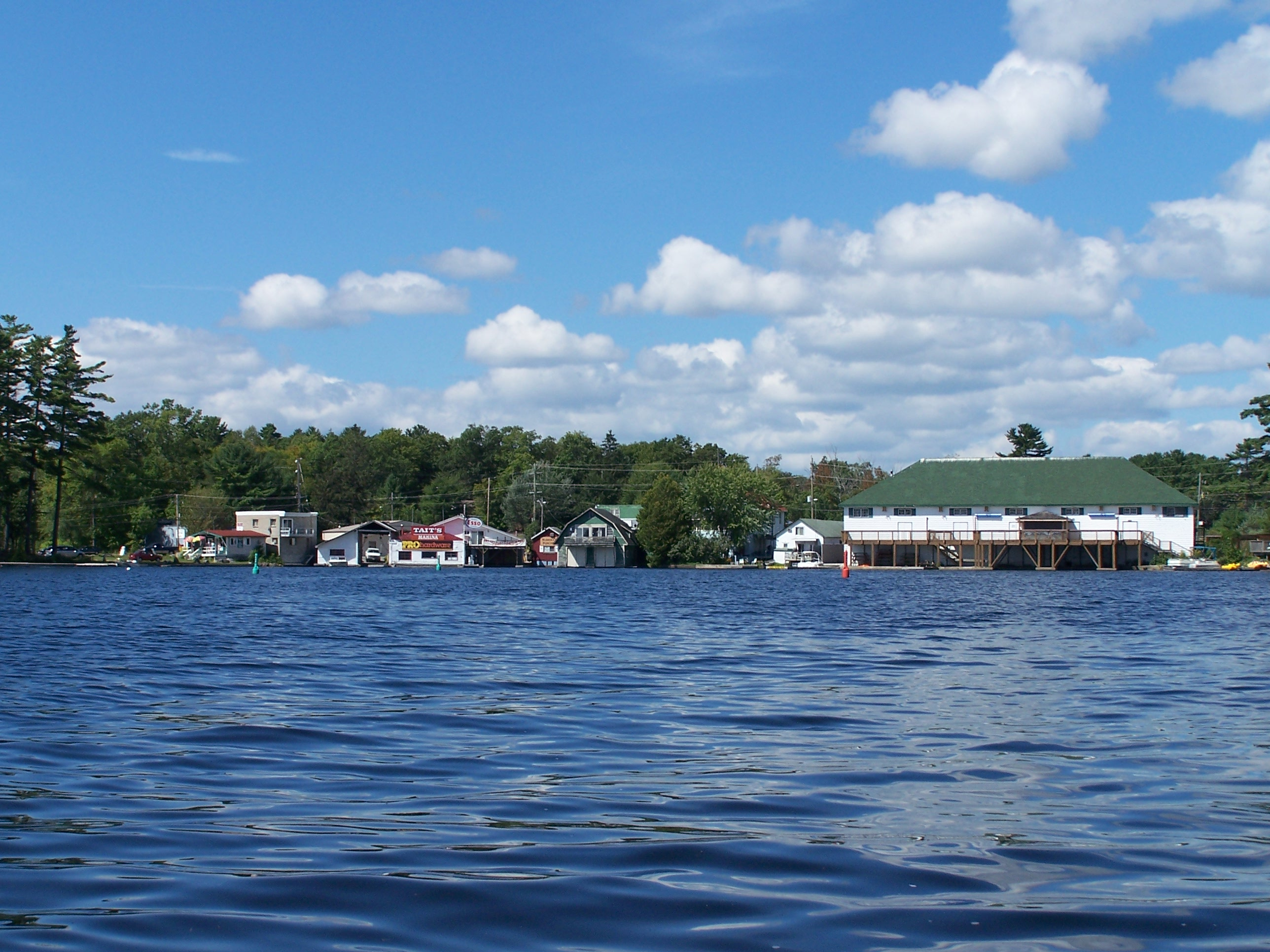
- The southern portion of the town as viewed from Bala Bay; the KEE to Bala is visible at right
- Etymology: Named for Bala, Wales
- Nickname: Cranberry Capital of Ontario
- Location in Southern Ontario
- Coordinates: 45°01′03″N 79°37′02″W
- Country: Canada
- Province: Ontario
- District: Muskoka
- Township Municipality: Muskoka Lakes
- Established: 1868
- Incorporated (town): 1914
- Amalgamated: 1971
- Founder: Thomas Burgess
- Elevation: 232 m (761 ft)
- Time zone: UTC-5 (Eastern Time Zone)
  - Summer (DST): UTC-4 (Eastern Time Zone)
- Postal code: P0C 1A0
- Area codes: 705, 249

Bala is a compact rural community in the township municipality of Muskoka Lakes, District Municipality of Muskoka in Central Ontario, Canada. It is well-known for the Bala Falls, the source of the Moon River, which flows from Lake Muskoka to the Georgian Bay.

It is considered one of the hubs of cottage country located north of Toronto. Thus, its year-round population of several hundred is increased by thousands of seasonal residents and weekend day-trippers during summer months. It is known as the Cranberry Capital of Ontario, as the province's largest cranberry farms, Muskoka Lakes Farm and Winery (formerly Johnston's Cranberry Marsh) and the former Iroquois Cranberry Growers (closed in 2017), are located nearby. It was once the smallest incorporated town in Canada until it was amalgamated into Muskoka Lakes Township.

== History ==
Bala was settled by Thomas Burgess in 1868. Thomas Burgess opened a sawmill and store to serve the area's scattered settlers. Thomas Burgess named it after the town of Bala in Wales with which it is officially twinned. Located on the Canadian Shield, it proved unsuitable for farming, and its fortunes declined as logging became less economically viable. Railway connections helped to re-establish the village as a popular location for summer resorts.

In 1914, the town incorporated with Burgess's son as the first mayor, making it the smallest incorporated town in Canada.

== Geography ==
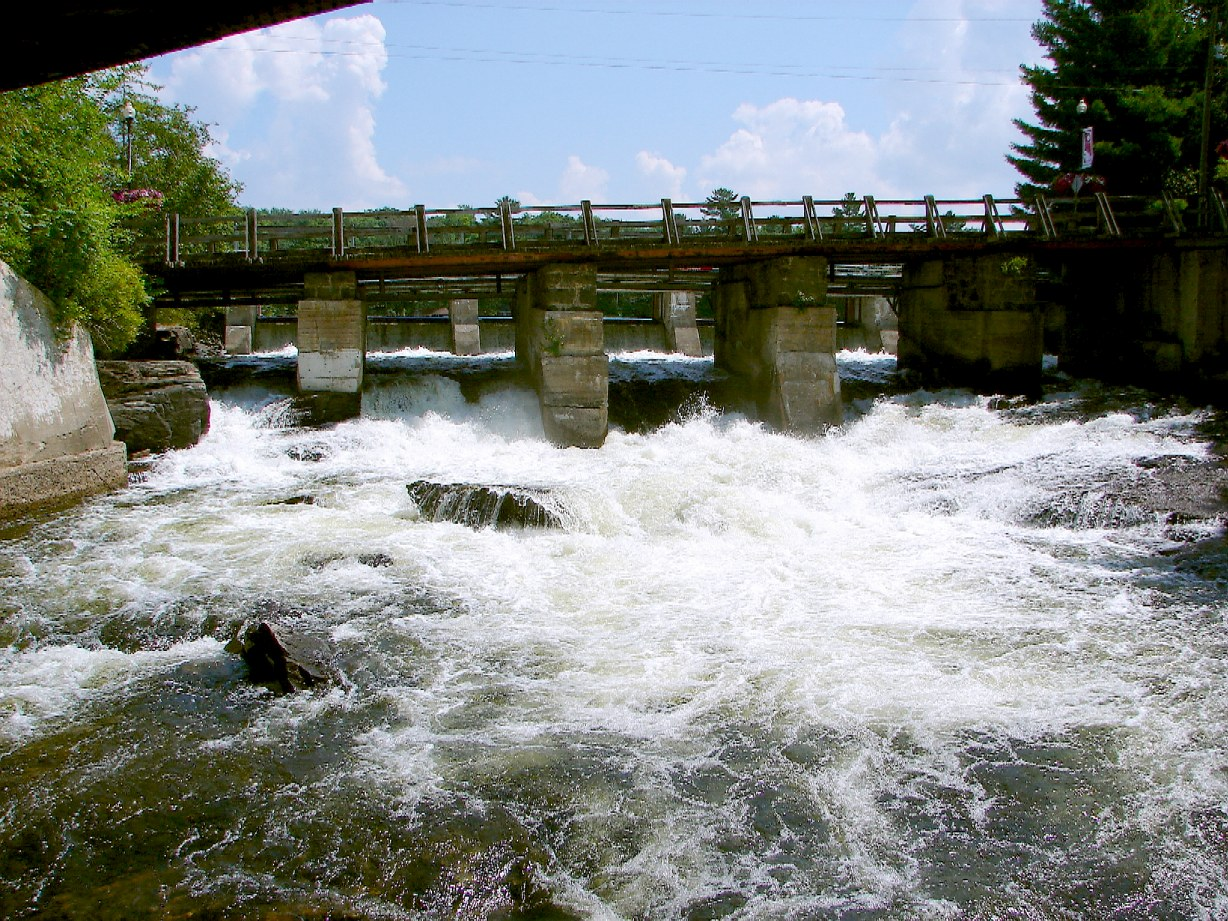
South Falls

Located at the west end of Lake Muskoka, at the foot of Bala Bay, the prominent geographical feature of the town are the many bare outcroppings of the Canadian Shield. Carved out of the Shield is Bala Falls, the only outlet for Lake Muskoka. That allows water to empty from the Muskoka River watershed into the Moon River and eventually Georgian Bay; however, the falls were at a low elevation and for many years the water levels of Lake Muskoka were known to fluctuate eight or nine feet every season, between the spring runoffs and the late fall. That led to many navigation problems both for the timber industry and the settlers. In 1873, a control dam was built at the Bala Falls, which still exists in an upgraded form and is known as the North Falls. However, the dam worked too well and led to flooding, which forced the construction soon after of a large flood control dam and channel, known today as the South Falls.

A further channel north of the North Falls was created in the 1880s to power a sawmill and later reused as the water intake channel for a hydroelectric station built in 1917. The station, operated by the Bala Electric Light and Power Company to supply electricity as far as MacTier and Port Carling was retired in 1957 but then returned to active use as a small remotely-operated station in the 1990s. It remains in use today.

A second station operated between the North and South Falls from 1924 to 1957 but was later demolished because it was uneconomical. A new generating station is being built at the site, a project that caused much local controversy.

== Transportation ==
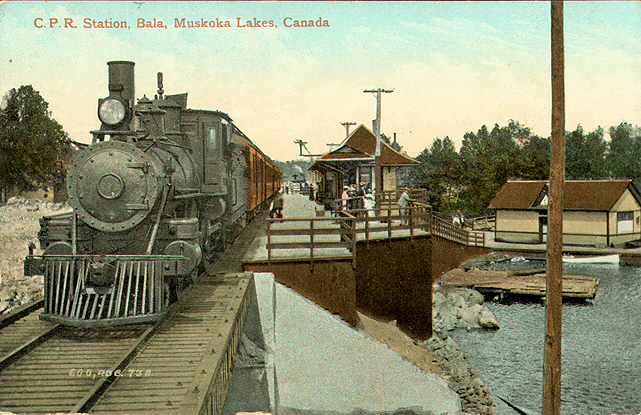
CPR station circa 1910

Bala was well connected and once was connected only to other Muskoka communities via the steamship lines that plied the Muskoka Lakes. The Cherokee, Islander and Segwun were frequently seen at the dock below the CPR station, and the Ahmic was based on the other side of Bala Bay in Torrance. Steamships have been unable to visit Bala since 1964, when the swing bridge at Bala Park Island was sealed shut. A portion of the former steamer dock remains, maintained for many decades by the MNR and today by the Township of Muskoka Lakes.

In 1907 the Canadian Pacific Railway opened a prominent "summer" station at the harbour, complete with freight elevator (a "winter" station was located a half-mile north). There was also a seasonal Grand Trunk Railway (later CN) station across the bay on Bala Park Island. In 1927, six CPR train routes each way served Bala, four on a daily basis. With the influx of many American cottagers, Bala even became a Customs Port of Entry. The Bala Weekend trains continued to serve the tourists until 1963, when the station was demolished.

The settlement-era Musquosh Road from Gravenhurst arrived in the 1880s and fed further development after the heyday of the railways as the route was eventually upgraded from a rough trail into first the Rama Road, then the provincial Highway 69 (later renumbered to Highway 169, then to Muskoka Road 169). A postwar bypass was created for the highway to avoid the original Musquosh Road bridge and single-lane rail underpass at the South Falls, but that also had the effect of removing traffic from Bala's former main street south of the Falls, severely impacting businesses on that section and concentrating commercial activity along the highway north of the Falls.

== Services ==
In 1971, the town was amalgamated with other townships and municipalities to form the Township of Muskoka Lakes; the Chamber of Commerce office is in Bala; other civic functions are located in Port Carling.

Bala was the location of one of the first detachment of Ontario Provincial Police in 1909. A small modern station remains just north of the main part of town (run by the Bracebridge detachment part-time). The Canada Post Post Office has been relocated to share space with the police station.

== Historic lodgings ==
Until changes in transportation and development led to most seasonal visitors staying in private cottages, Bala offered summer lodging at a large number of tourist resorts over the decades. For example, Windsor Park is on the site of the former Windsor Hotel. Located on River Street were Bala Cozy Cabins and Roselawn Lodge. The Bala Bay Inn (formerly the Swastika Inn until a postwar name change) remained as an active hotel until 2016. Built in 1910, it is Muskoka's oldest brick hotel. The original tin ceiling and mahogany staircase still grace the front lobby.

== Culture and entertainment ==
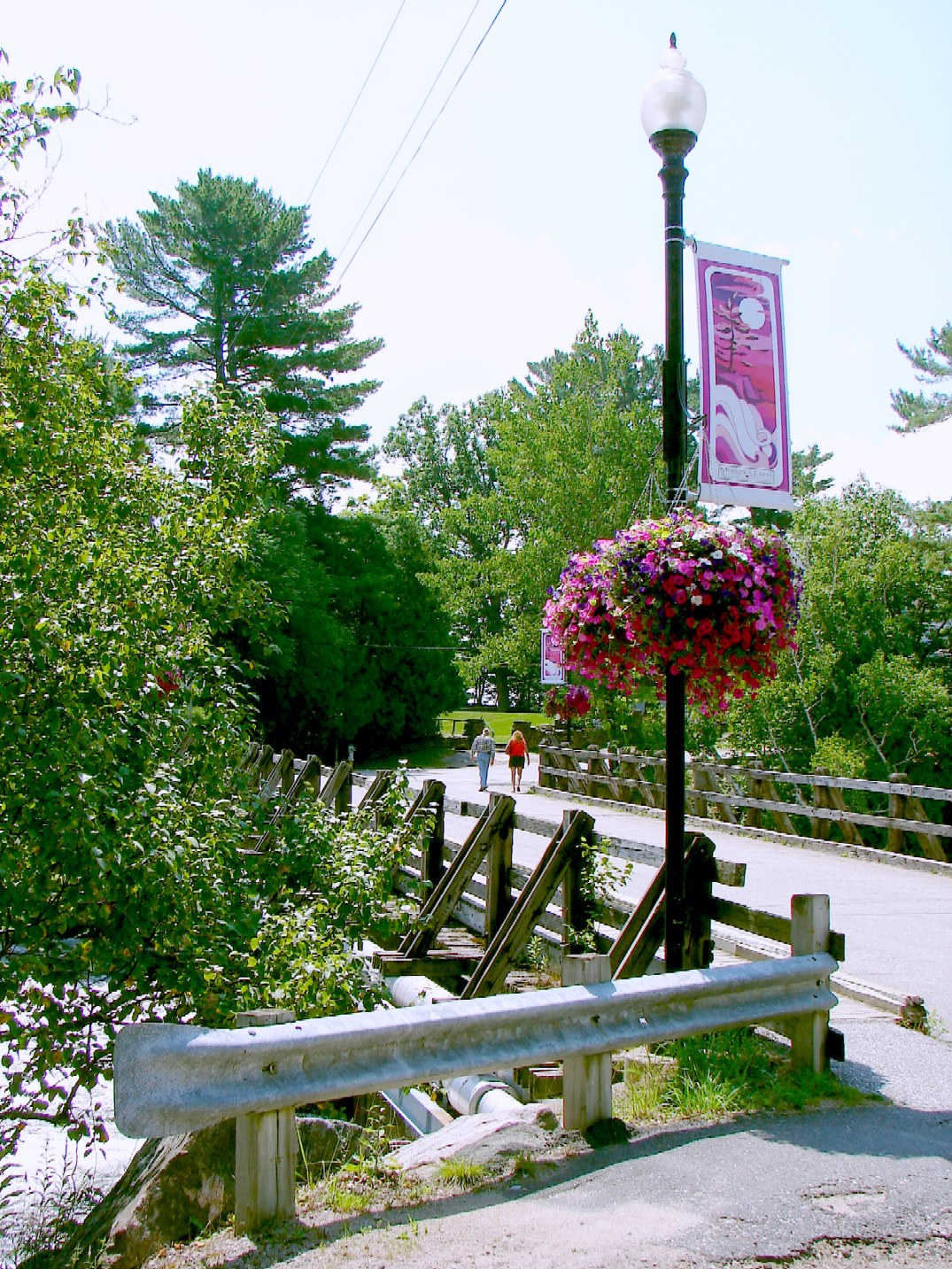
Bridge over the South Falls

Since 1942, under various management and names, the community and the surrounding area has offered live musical entertainment. In the 1940s and '50s, Big Bands like Mart Kenney, Cab Calloway, Tommy Dorsey, Jimmy Dorsey, Glenn Miller, Duke Ellington, Count Basie, Woody Herman and Louis Armstrong played at Dunn's Pavilion. Since the 1960s, rock musicians like David Wilcox, Kim Mitchell, The Ramones, April Wine, Burton Cummings and Jeff Healey played at The KEE to Bala. More recently, bands such as Metric, Sum 41, The Tragically Hip, The Sam Roberts Band, Hinder, Finger Eleven, Three Days Grace, Sloan, Tim Hicks, Hedley and Theory of a Deadman have graced the stage at The KEE to Bala. In the 1980s, Bala and Port Carling were also featured in a skit by The Frantics on Boot to the Head. In the skit, a man on his way to Bala bores his companion to distraction in part by endlessly enumerating the communities' features. Most recently Bala is home to The New Actor's Colony professional Theatre company who perform seasonally in the summer in the local curling rink.

Lucy Maud Montgomery, author of the Anne of Green Gables books, visited Bala in 1922. The area made a sufficient impression on her that she based the novel The Blue Castle on the area, her only novel not set in Prince Edward Island. Based on the connection to a beloved Canadian author, Bala's Museum, a privately run museum featuring Montgomery, was opened in the 1990s.

Bala hosts the Bala Cranberry Festival annually on the weekend after Canadian Thanksgiving, attracting thousands of people to the town.

Once a week in the summer months, students from a nearby water ski school perform aquatic stunts for audiences at a local park. Students form pyramids, jump obstacles, ski barefoot, and occasionally ski while they wear alpine skis.

Bala Bay remains a sailing hotspot in Muskoka due to its excellent and consistent winds. A local sailing club organizes Saturday races.

== See also ==
- List of unincorporated communities in Ontario
