= Thomas Burgess (settler) =

Thomas Burgess was the founder of Bala, Ontario, Canada (now part of the cottage country region of Muskoka), who first settled there in 1868 and established a sawmill and a general store.
