= Ain't Life Amazing =

Studio album by Kim Mitchell
- Released: July 17, 2007
- Genre: Rock
- Label: Alert, Koch

Kim Mitchell chronology
Fill Your Head with Rock (2005)	Ain't Life Amazing (2007)	The Big Fantasize (2020)

Ain't Life Amazing is the eighth album from Canadian singer and guitarist Kim Mitchell. The album was released on July 17, 2007.

== Track listing ==
1. "Ain't Life Amazing" - 4:17
2. "Rock That Rhyme" - 3:45
3. "I Got a Line on You" - 4:50
4. "Love Overtime" - 5:07
5. "Bad Times" - 5:12
6. "Dreamthieves" - 4:45
7. "Space" - 3:29
8. "In the Stars Tonight" - 5:12
9. "Killer's Name" - 4:43
10. "Lick a Message" - 4:32
11. "N'awlin Nights" - 5:11 / "Fill Your Head With Rock" (hidden track) - 5:29 (total: 11:11)

== Personnel ==
- Kim Mitchell - Guitar, vocals
- Greg Morrow - Drums
- Jon Hardy - Bass
- Peter Fredette - Background vocals
- Ken Spider Sinneve - Bass on "N'awlin' Nights"

== Credits ==
- Engineered by Jon Hardy, Russ Mackay, Ben Strano and Joshua Mitchell
- Recorded in Toronto, Nashville and Houston
- Mixed by Jon Hardy
- Produced by Jon Hardy and Los Bozos
