= The KEE to Bala =

Concert venue in Ontario, Canada

Coordinates: 45.01230°N 79.61370°W

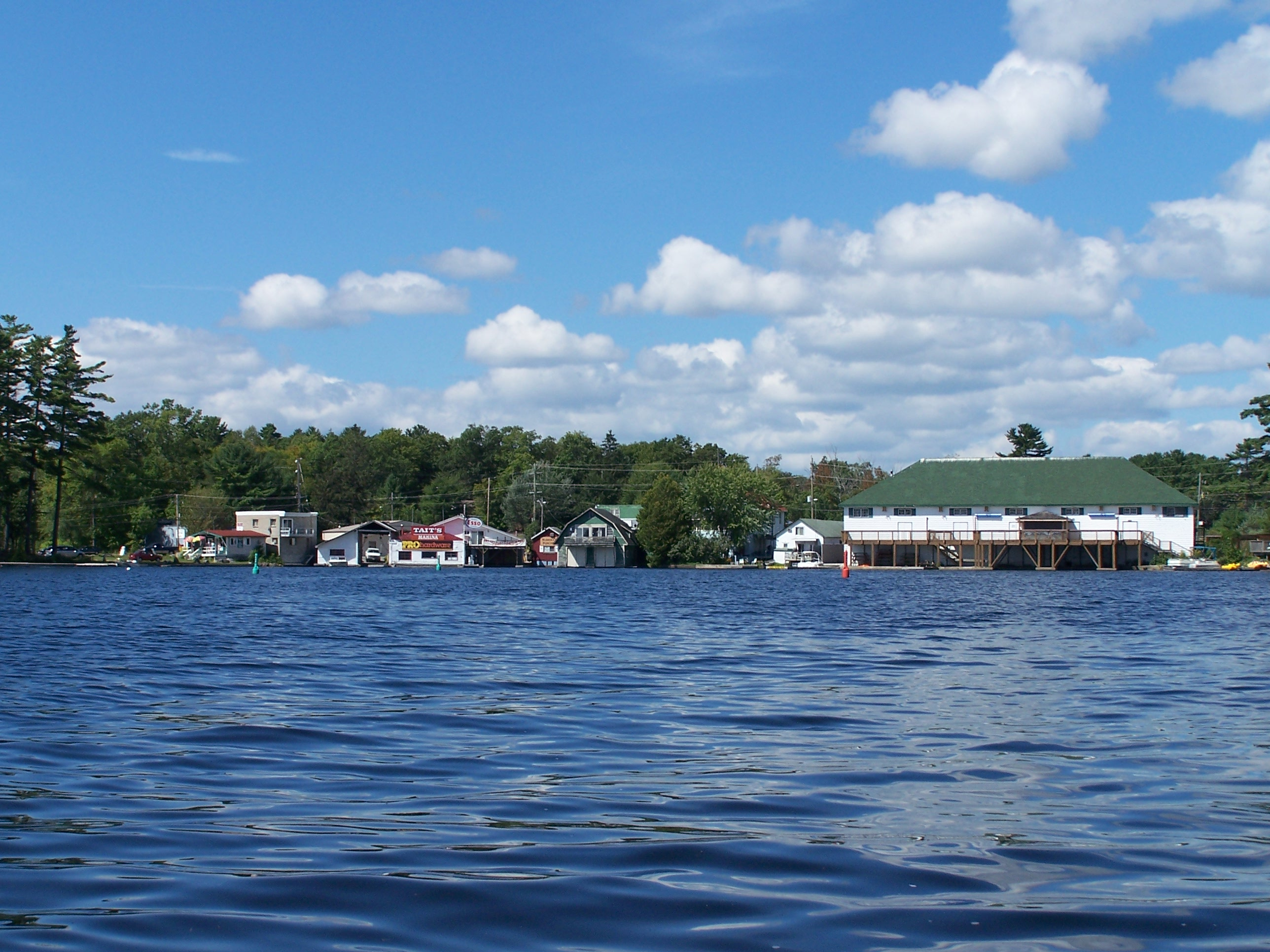
The KEE to Bala (right) as viewed from Bala Bay

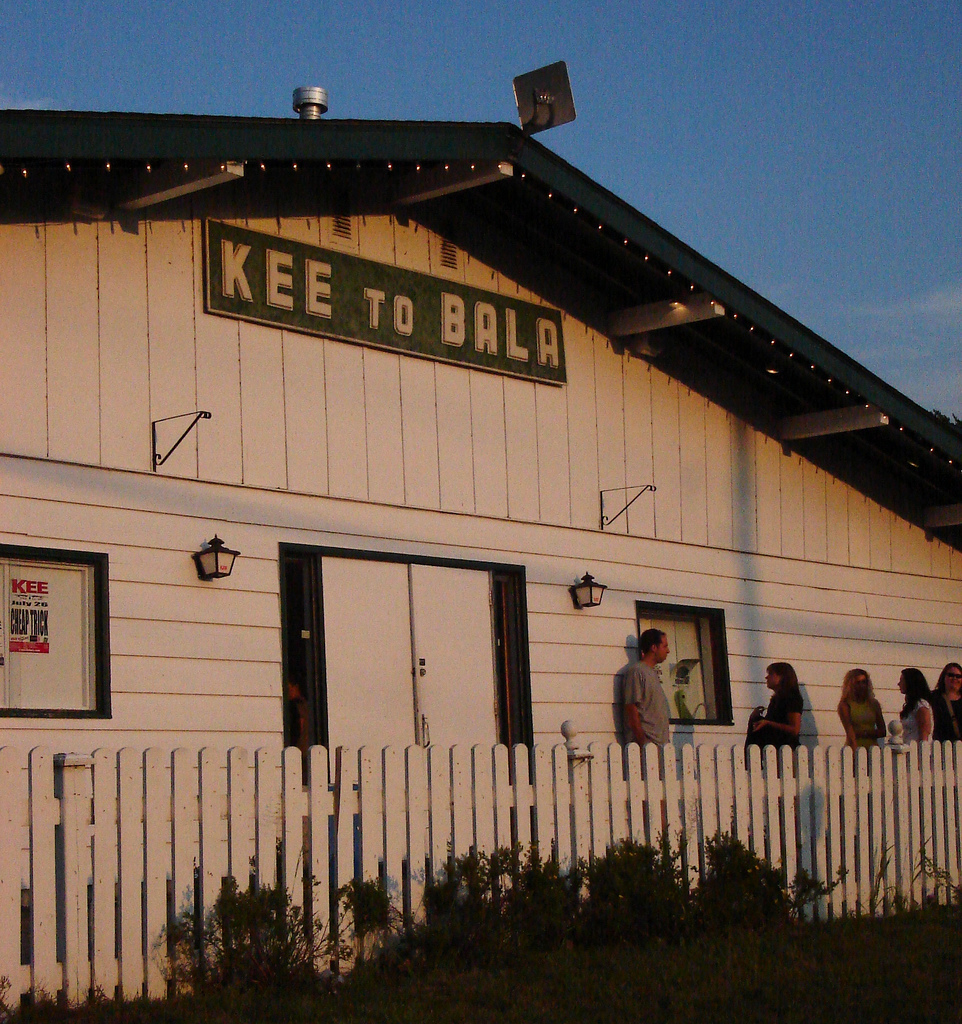
Concertgoers line up outside the entrance to the Kee to Bala

The KEE to Bala, originally called "Dunn's Pavilion," is a concert venue and bar located on Lake Muskoka, in the town of Bala, Ontario, Canada. Dunn's Pavilion was originally purchased by owner Gerry Dunn in 1929, and built into a concert hall in 1930 with the aim of hosting big bands. Back in the 1930s the slogan for the concert hall was, "Where All of Muskoka Dances." The existing building was constructed in 1942. The name was changed to The KEE to Bala in the late 1960s after changing ownership twice. In 2023, the Kee was purchased by Live Nation.

== History ==
Gerry Patrick Dunn purchased the property in 1929 when there was only a small ice cream parlour and drugstore on the lot. Dunn started renovating the buildings in the second year of ownership in order to be able to host orchestras as an attraction in the small town. The first two bands to play in the renovated building were Jerry Richardson and the Varsity Collegians, and Carl Mueller's Varsity Entertainers.

At the end of the 1930s, Dunn decided to tear down the old building in order to be able to host the bigger bands he desired, and provide more room for people to dance. The expansion was built by Gerry Dunn himself, as well as 14 additional workers. It is said that while the construction was taking place you could often see him sitting on the roof, anchoring down the supports. "'I designed the pavilion myself – no architect was involved,' says Dunn, who at 97 years old was back at his Bala summer home in 1998".

The new building was completed in the summer of 1942; built with the stage backdrop to be a façade of an actual small cottage. Dunn renovated the dance floor and was expanded from 35 feet to 100 feet. They hosted small house bands and dancing 6 nights a week, and big bands once a week throughout the summer months. People would dress up in their finest attire and make a night of dancing. Customers would have to bring their own alcohol after the prohibition and during the depression years because most venues didn't have the licenses to sell it because it was very expensive to obtain the license. On the nights of the Big Bands, Dunn would try to attract people from the cities and towns surrounding Bala, as well as attracting people from Toronto who would enjoy a weekend away. The dance hall was used for church services on Sunday mornings.

== New ownership ==
In 1963, at the age of 62, Gerry Dunn sold Dunn's Pavilion to Russell Hore. The manager was Mr. Marshall Louch and so Ray Cockburn must have purchased it later. It was still Dunns Pavilion in 1964 and 1965. Ray had owned a similar venue in Orillia called 'The Pavalon' and wanted to expand his ownership in the bar business. In order to take advantage of the new rock and roll style of music, Ray renamed the venue and called it The KEE to Bala. "Says Ray, 'A short name, easily remembered, was what I wanted, and when someone suggested that the pavilion was the `key' to Bala and the surrounding Muskoka area, I jumped at the idea and changed the spelling to KEE.'" The KEE had wonderful years throughout the 1960s and 1970s under Ray's ownership. This was because Ray promised the bands that they could play in Orillia one night, and in Bala the next night making it worth the detour. Normally bands wouldn't travel two hours north of the major cities in order to perform, but after they played in Toronto they often liked visiting relaxing venues to play for smaller crowds.

In the 1970s the Parry family approached Ray Cockburn wanting to buy out The KEE; they owned it throughout the 1970s and 1980s. They updated the venue to make it more of a bar by obtaining a liquor license, building a new stage, and installing bars so that it was no longer BYOB.

After this it was sold to Joe Kondyjowski who had a lot of experience in the dance hall business. He took over in the 1980s and brought in large rock and roll crowds. Joe made enough money in order to cover the expenses to fix up the old wooden building, create a parking lot, install a new roof, build a new deck, and put in cement cribs to fix the fact that the building was starting to sink. He installed a new kitchen in order to serve food in addition to the alcohol at the bars, while updating the colour scheme to give the venue a "Cape Cod" feel.

Joe Kondyjowski sold The KEE in 1990 to Sanober Patel who was assisted by her son Jim. Sanober brought in a weekly comedy night in order to try to obtain more business from a larger variety of people as well as a big band event to attract the old clientele that used to attend.

In 1995, The KEE was sold to a partnership; Stephen Wylie was one of the partners and he took over the operations of the business. Stephen understood the importance that the venue had for many people and tried to hold onto the history in the building. He repainted it back to the original colours and even brought back Big Band dances where the band would use the original stage.

== Present ==
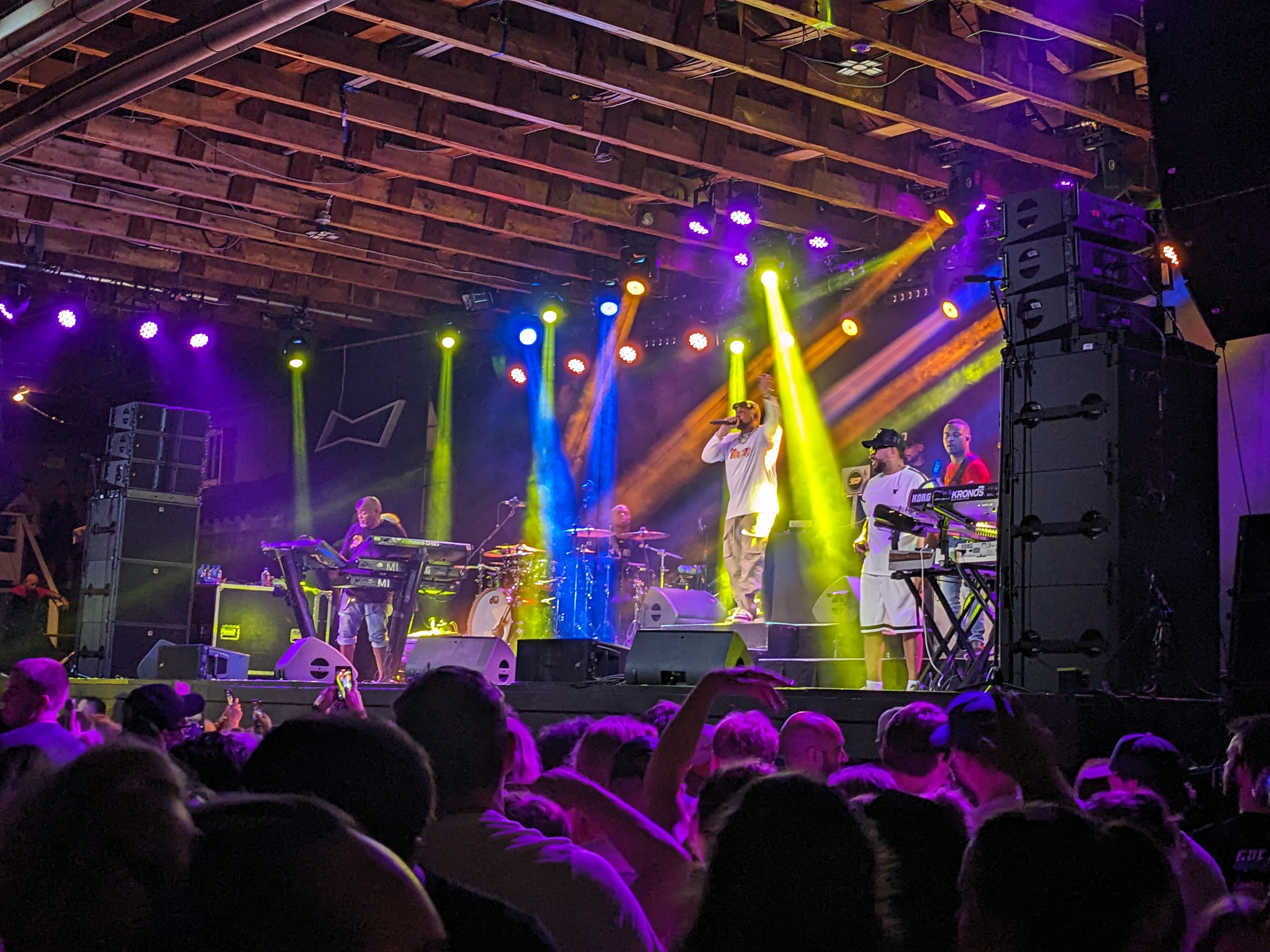
Sean Paul plays to a sold out crows at the KEE to Bala in August 2024

The building has now been called "The KEE to Bala" for over 30 years. The dress code has since changed from formal attire to casual clothing with the music changing to fit with the new generations.

In 2023, Live Nation announced that they had purchased the venue and would run it in partnership with the prior owners becoming the venue operators.
