= Aural Fixations =

Studio album by Kim Mitchell
- Released: April 7, 1992
- Studio: Cherry Beach Sound, His Master's Workshop, The Millbrook Mudroom
- Genre: Rock
- Length: 55:56
- Label: Alert (Canada); Fresh Fruit/SPV (Europe)
- Producer: Kim Mitchell, John Webster

Kim Mitchell chronology
I Am a Wild Party (Live) (1990)	Aural Fixations (1992)	Itch (1994)

European cover

Professional ratings
Review scores
Source	Rating
AllMusic	3/5 stars
Collector's Guide to Heavy Metal	4/10

Aural Fixations is the fifth album from Canadian singer and guitarist Kim Mitchell. The album was released in 1992 and is certified gold in Canada. This is the first Kim Mitchell album (including the five Max Webster studio albums) that does not include songs co-written with Pye Dubois.

== Track listing ==
All songs written by Kim Mitchell and Jim Chevalier, except where indicated

1. "World's Such a Wonder" – 4:57
2. "Pure as Gold" (Mitchell, Moe Berg) – 5:13
3. "Big Smoke" (Mitchell, Andy Curran) – 6:08
4. "America" – 4:27
5. "Some Folks" – 4:40
6. "Find the Will" – 4:53
7. "There's a Story" – 4:37
8. "Dreamer" – 4:11
9. "Dog and a Bone" (Mitchell, Curran) – 4:44
10. "Flames" – 5:13
11. "Hullabaloo" – 4:06
12. "Honey Forget Those Blues" (Mitchell) – 2:28

== Personnel ==
Musicians

- Kim Mitchell – rhythm and lead guitar, vocals, producer
- Bobby Edwards, Jim Taite, Mike Francis, Rob Pilch, Bernie LaBarge – guitars (track 12)
- Orest Sushco – dulcimer
- John Webster – keyboards, producer
- Spider Sinnaeve – bass
- Greg Critchley – drums
- Peter Fredette, Rob Bertola – background vocals

Production

- Arrangements by Kim Mitchell, Todd Booth and John Webster, except track 12 arranged by Bobby Edwards
- Recorded by Mark Wright
- Recording assisted by Eric Abrahams (Cherry Beach), Bob Shindle (Cherry Beach "Big Room"), Orest Sushco and Eric Lambi (His Master's Workshop)
- Mixed by Joe Hardy at Ardent Studios, Memphis, Tennessee
- Mastered by Bob Ludwig at Masterdisk
- W. Tom Berry – executive producer, management
