= Kim Mitchell =

Canadian musician (born 1952)

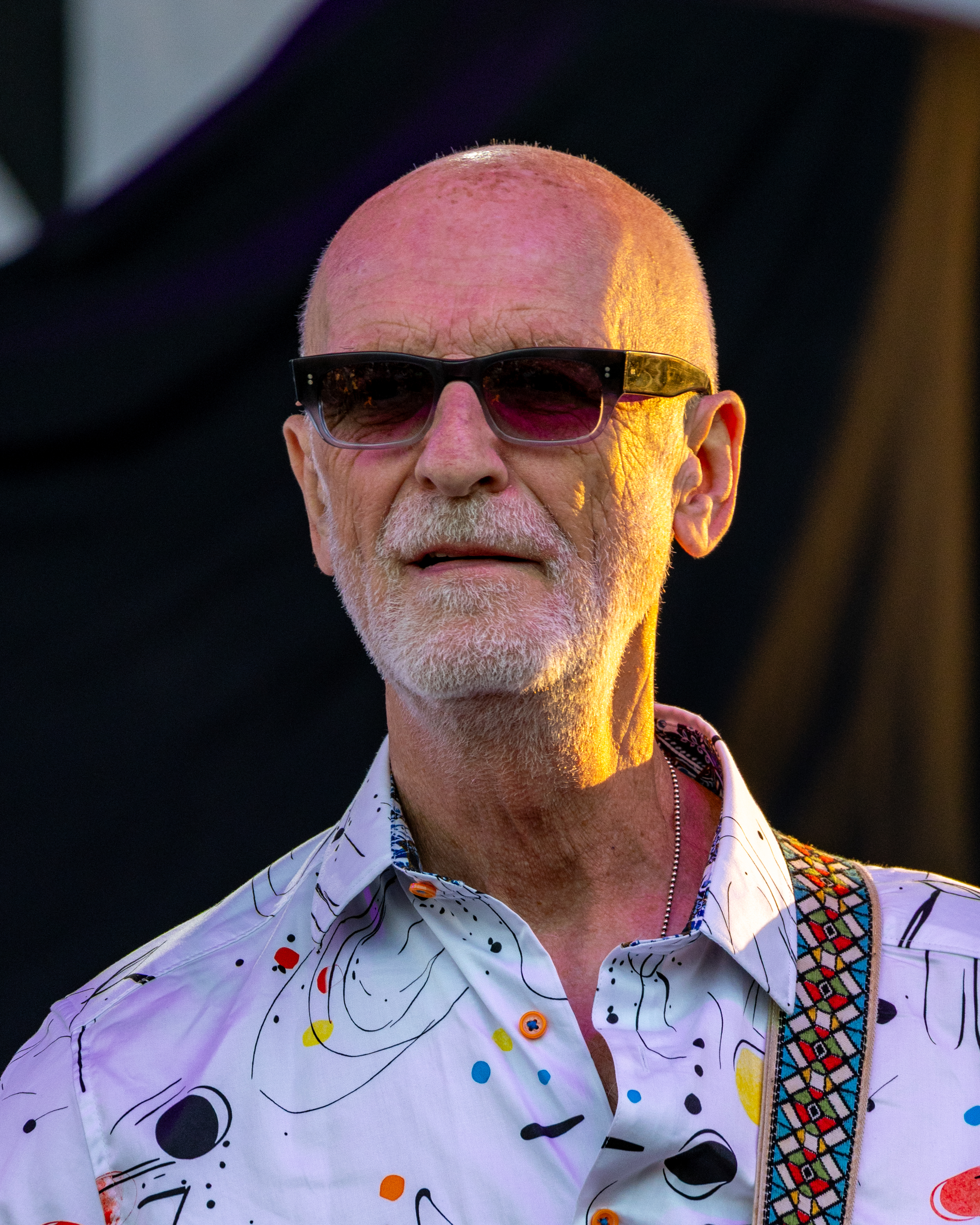
- Mitchell in 2025

Background information
- Born: July 10, 1952 (age 74)
- Genres: Rock, hard rock, progressive rock
- Occupations: Musician, songwriter
- Instruments: Guitar, vocals
- Years active: 1965–present
- Labels: Anthem, Alert
- Formerly of: Max Webster
- Website: kimmitchell.ca

Joseph Kim Mitchell (born July 10, 1952) is a Canadian rock musician. He was the lead singer and guitarist for the band Max Webster before going on to a solo career. His 1984 single, "Go for Soda", was his only charted song on the US Billboard Hot 100, reaching number 86. Several other singles such as "Patio Lanterns", "Rock and Roll Duty", and "Rockland Wonderland", reached the top 20 in Canada.

== Early life ==
Mitchell attended St. Clair Secondary School in Sarnia, Ontario. During the 1970s, Mitchell began playing with local bands in Sarnia. After going through a few name changes with essentially the same band, Mitchell and "Zooom" headed for Toronto, Ontario. Zooom eventually dissolved, with Mitchell travelling to the Greek islands.

== Career ==
=== 1972–2003 ===
On his return to Canada, he formed the band Max Webster with fellow Sarnia native Pye Dubois. Max Webster toured extensively and built a string of hits. Mitchell's solo career began after his departure from Max Webster in 1982, with session work and a succession of solo albums.

A new sound was tested on the club circuit and recorded on his 1982 self-titled mini-album. Songs such as "Chain of Events" featured Mitchell's lead vocal and guitar and Dubois' suburban storytelling, anchored by the visceral drum/bass combination of Paul DeLong and Robert Sinclair Wilson. Peter Fredette added a vocal and guitar counterpoint.

In early 1985, the song "Go for Soda" from the Akimbo Alogo album became an international hit and remains his best known song outside of his native Canada. His most successful Canadian album was the follow-up, 1986's Shakin' Like a Human Being, featuring the hits "Alana Loves Me", "Easy to Tame", and the biggest hit of his career, "Patio Lanterns". His 1989 album, Rockland, achieved critical acclaim and was the highest placing chart album of his career.

In 1991, Mitchell played guitar on the track "Brave and Crazy" from Tom Cochrane's album Mad Mad World. In that same year he also made a cameo appearance (as himself) on the third-season finale of the Canadian sketch program The Kids in the Hall. In 1995, Mitchell participated in the Kumbaya Festival to raise money for AIDS research.

=== 2004–present ===
Mitchell entered the radio broadcasting industry, becoming an afternoon drivetime host on Toronto classic rock radio station Q107 (CILQ-FM) from April 2004 until August 2015.

On November 15, 2004, Mitchell was awarded the National Achievement Award by SOCAN at the 2004 SOCAN Awards in Toronto.

In 2006, Mitchell provided a guitar solo on the song "Wind It Up" from the Barenaked Ladies' album Barenaked Ladies Are Me.

Mitchell opened for Def Leppard at the Molson Amphitheatre in Toronto on July 16, 2007. His eighth studio album, Ain't Life Amazing, was released on July 17, 2007.

Mitchell has been on the same live bill with many acts over the course of his solo career including Sammy Hagar, Def Leppard, Aerosmith, and Van Halen.

In January 2016, Mitchell underwent emergency surgery for a heart attack.

On May 21, 2020, Mitchell was inducted into the Canadian Songwriters Hall of Fame, although due to the COVID-19 pandemic in Canada the honour was not formally presented to him until 2021.

On October 2, 2021, Mitchell performed a sold-out show at the "Sarnia OktBorderFest" in Point Edward, Ontario, followed by the Barenaked Ladies. It is estimated that over 6,000 people were in attendance over the two-night event.

== Discography ==
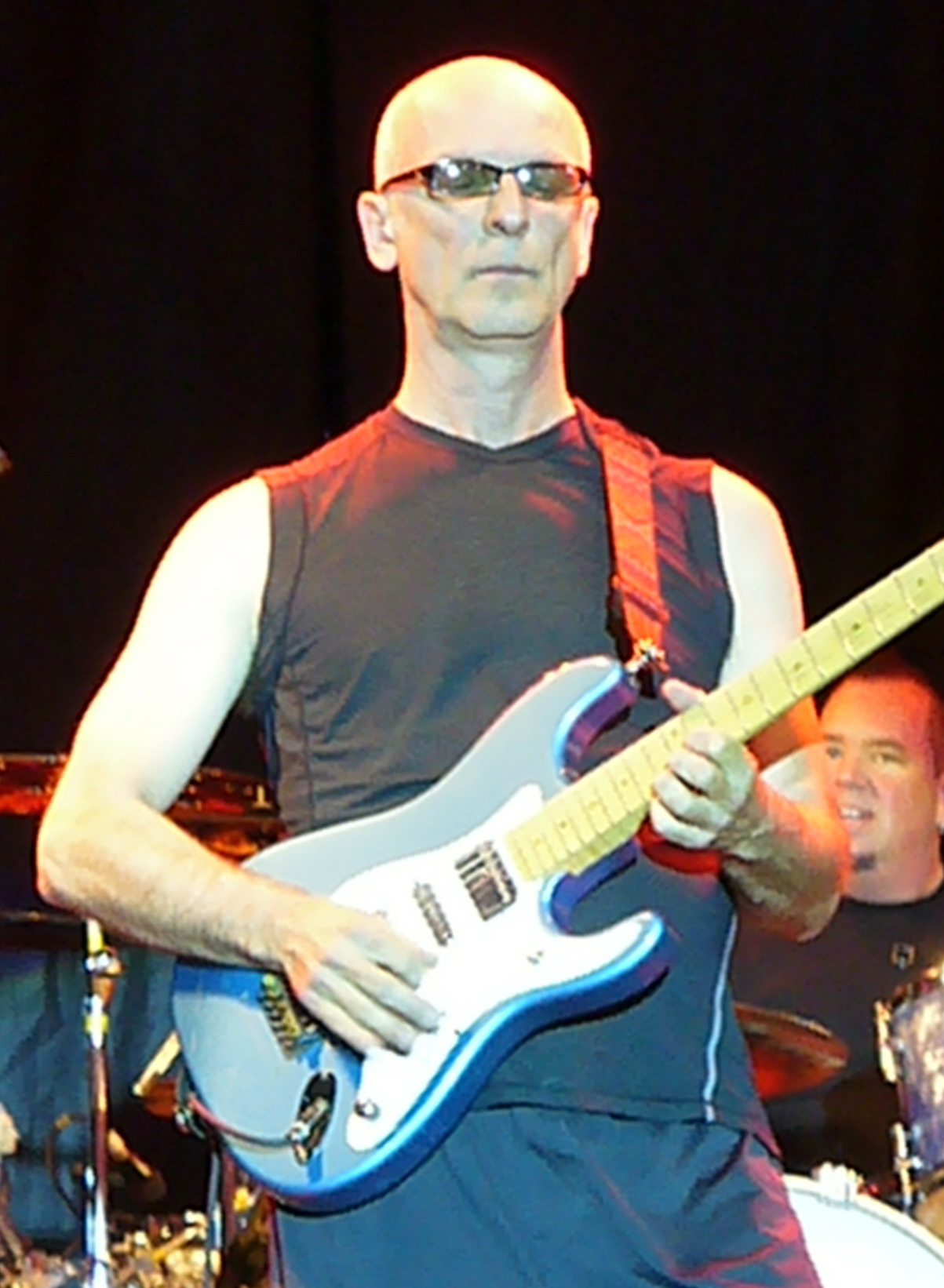
Mitchell at the Fergus Truck Show, 2008

=== Albums ===
==== Studio albums ====
Year	Album	Peak chart positions		Certifications
Year	Album	CAN	US	CAN
1984	Akimbo Alogo	23	106	Platinum
1986	Shakin' Like a Human Being	6	—	3× Platinum
1989	Rockland	4	—	2× Platinum
1992	Aural Fixations	17	—	Gold
1994	Itch	55	—	
1999	Kimosabe	—	—	
2007	Ain't Life Amazing	—	—	
2020	The Big Fantasize	—	—	

==== Extended plays ====
Year	Title	Chart position
Year	Title	CAN
1982	Kim Mitchell	38

==== Live albums ====
Year	Title	Chart positions	Certifications
Year	Title	CAN	CAN
1990	I Am a Wild Party	—	Platinum

==== Compilation albums ====
Year	Title	Chart positions	Certifications
Year	Title	CAN	CAN
1995	Greatest Hits	31	Platinum
2005	Fill Your Head with Rock	—	

=== Singles ===
List of singles, with selected chart positions and certifications, showing year released and album name
Year	Title	Peak chart positions				Album
Year	Title	CAN	CAN Content (Cancon)	US	US Rock	Album
1982	"Miss Demeanor"	—	—	—	—	Kim Mitchell
1984	"Lager & Ale"	—	—	—	—	Akimbo Alogo
1984	"Go for Soda"	22	1	86	12	Akimbo Alogo
1984	"All We Are"	79	10	—	—	Akimbo Alogo
1986	"Patio Lanterns"	12	1	—	36	Shakin' Like a Human Being
1986	"Alana Loves Me"	31	4	—	—	Shakin' Like a Human Being
1987	"Easy to Tame"	32	2	—	—	Shakin' Like a Human Being
1987	"In Your Arms"	97	—	—	—	Shakin' Like a Human Being
1989	"Rock 'n' Roll Duty"	7	1	—	—	Rockland
1989	"Rockland Wonderland"	10	—	—	—	Rockland
1990	"Expedition Sailor"	20	—	—	—	Rockland
1990	"Lost Lovers Found"	78	—	—	—	Rockland
1990	"All We Are" (Live)	73	—	—	—	I Am a Wild Party
1990	"I Am a Wild Party" (Live)	43	—	—	—	I Am a Wild Party
1992	"Find the Will"	28	—	—	—	Aural Fixations
1992	"America"	3	—	—	—	Aural Fixations
1992	"World's Such a Wonder"	—	8	—	—	Aural Fixations
1992	"Pure as Gold"	21	—	—	—	Aural Fixations
1993	"Some Folks"	16	—	—	—	Aural Fixations
1994	"Acrimony"	40	2	—	—	Itch
1994	"Wonder Where and Why"	63	8	—	—	Itch
1994	"Lemon Wedge"	—	1	—	—	Itch
1995	"The U.S. of Ache"	78	—	—	—	Itch
1995	"Rainbow"	21	—	—	—	Greatest Hits
1995	"No More Walking Away"	35	—	—	—	Greatest Hits
2020	"Wishes"					The Big Fantasize
2020	"2Up 2B Down"					The Big Fantasize

==== Guest singles ====
Year	Title	Artist	Album
2006	"Young at Heart"	Charlie Major	Shadows and Light

== Juno Awards ==
Mitchell has been awarded several Juno Awards for his work:

- 1983 – Most Promising Male Vocalist of the Year
- 1987 – Album of the Year: Shakin' Like A Human Being
- 1990 – Male Vocalist of the Year

== Television appearances ==
- Mitchell made a cameo appearance on the show Twitch City.
- In 2005, Mitchell played a taxi driver on the sixth episode of the third season of Puppets Who Kill, titled "Buttons and the Paternity Suit".
- On the sixth episode of the seventh season of the Canadian sitcom Trailer Park Boys, Ricky (Robb Wells) plays one of Mitchell's songs, "Go For Soda", on 8 track, while exclaiming "Bubbles, while you rock a piss, I'll rock some Mitchell."
- Mitchell appeared in a skit on the Canadian show The Kids in the Hall, teaching senior citizens how to tune the electric guitar.
- "Go For Soda" was in Season 2, Episode 5:Buddies, on Miami Vice

== Family ==
Mitchell has two sons, Josh and Jesse. Jesse works for his father as a drum tech and road manager.

== In popular culture ==
He was the subject of the Rush song, "I Think I'm Going Bald".

== See also ==
- Max Webster
- Canadian rock
- Music of Canada
- Juno Award
