= Pye Dubois =

Canadian lyricist and poet (1948–2026)

- Born: Paul Phillip Woods; October 6, 1948
- Origin: Canada
- Died: September 15, 2026 (aged 77) London, Ontario, Canada
- Genres: Hard rock, progressive rock
- Occupation: Lyricist
- Years active: 1976–1996

Paul Phillip Woods (October 6, 1948 – September 15, 2026), known as Pye Dubois, was a Canadian lyricist and poet. He worked mainly with Kim Mitchell and Max Webster (with whom he was considered an unofficial fifth non-performing member), and occasionally Rush.

== Life and career ==
Dubois accompanied Max Webster in the studio and wrote lyrics for each of their albums. He was given lyric-writing credits on several Rush songs, most notably "Tom Sawyer", which has been included on the soundtrack of several films. Dubois wrote the poem "There is a Lake Between Sun and Moon", which inspired Rush to write many of the lyrics for the album Counterparts, including a song of the same name for which Dubois received co-writing credit. He is also credited as a co-writer on the Rush songs "Force Ten" and "Test for Echo".

After Max Webster dissolved, Dubois continued his writing relationship with singer and guitarist Kim Mitchell on his solo songs. This included all but one of the songs on Kim's platinum Akimbo Alogo, every song on the triple platinum Shakin' Like a Human Being, and double platinum Rockland. Dubois had a falling-out with Mitchell during the sessions for Rockland, caused by Mitchell's decision to record the album in the US without Dubois present in the studio as he had been in the past. Dubois did not write on Mitchell's follow-up album, Aural Fixations (lyrics on that album were handled largely by Jim Chevalier and Andy Curran), but did return for 1994's Itch. Dubois took part in several Max Webster reunion concerts, but not their most recent one in Toronto on May 24, 2007, and has not written lyrics with Mitchell since 1994. His last credited new co-composition was "Test For Echo", co-written with (and performed by) Rush in 1996.

On July 20, 2007, Dubois was reported to have gone missing, causing concern with his neighbour, author Martin Popoff. However, Dubois had just taken some time alone and soon returned.

Dubois and Mitchell were inducted into the Canadian Songwriters Hall of Fame in 2021. Only Mitchell showed up to the induction event.

Dubois died at his home in London, Ontario, on September 15, 2026, at the age of 77.
